= Mahoning County, Ohio =

County in Ohio, United States

- County
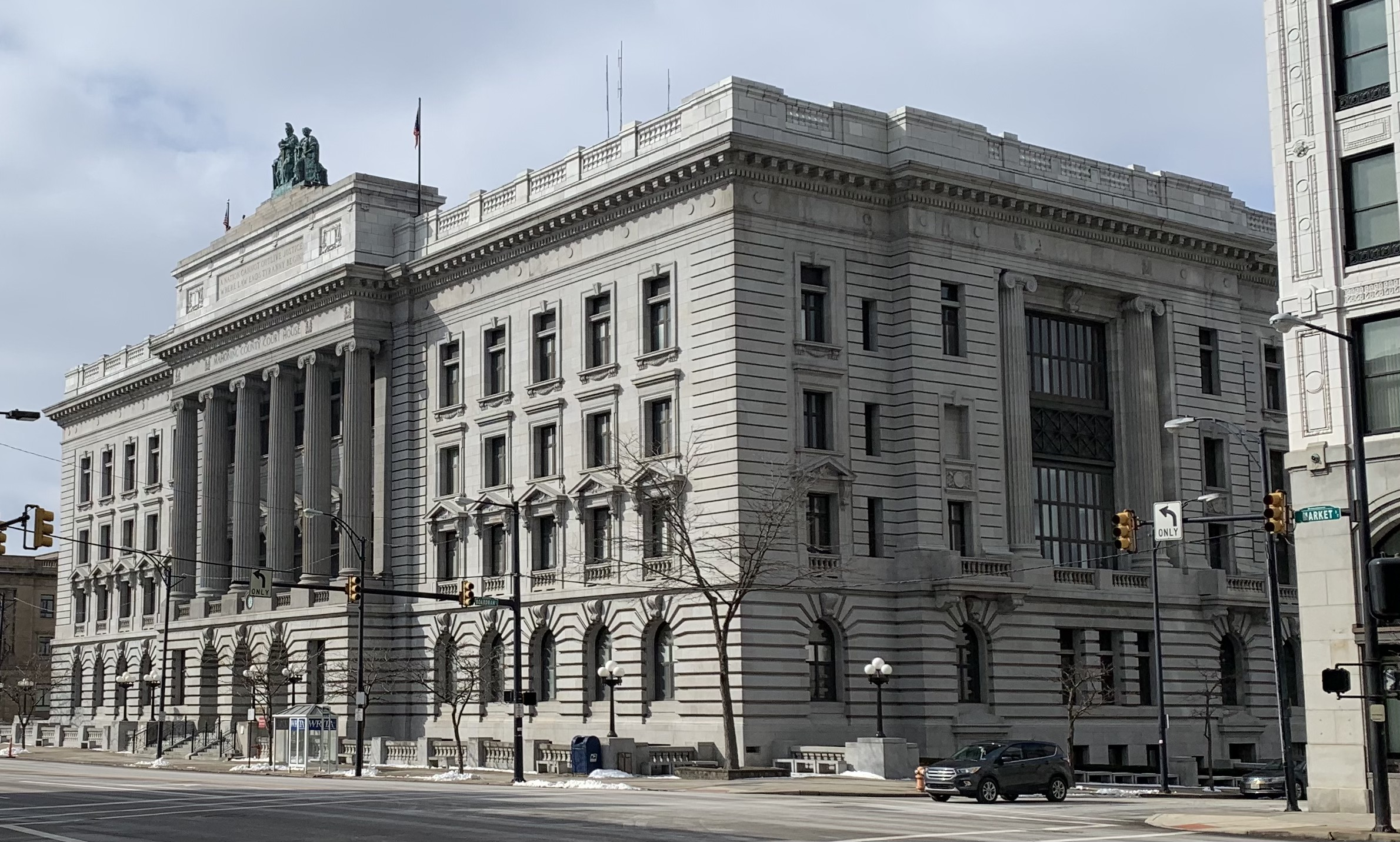
- Mahoning County Courthouse

- Flag Seal

- Location within the U.S. state of Ohio
- Coordinates: 41°01′N 80°46′W
- Country: United States
- State: Ohio
- Founded: March 1, 1846
- Named for: A Native American word for salt lick
- Seat: Youngstown
- Largest city: Youngstown

Area
  - Total: 425 sq mi (1,100 km^{2})
  - Land: 412 sq mi (1,070 km^{2})
  - Water: 14 sq mi (36 km^{2}) 3.2%

Population (2020)
  - Total: 228,614
  - Estimate (2025): 224,706 ▼
  - Density: 555/sq mi (214/km^{2})
- Time zone: UTC−5 (Eastern)
  - Summer (DST): UTC−4 (EDT)
- Congressional district: 6th
- Website: www.mahoningcountyoh.gov

Mahoning County is located in the U.S. state of Ohio. As of the 2020 census, the population was 228,614. Its county seat and largest city is Youngstown. The county is named after the Mahoning River and was formed on March 1, 1846; the 83rd county in Ohio.

Present-day Mahoning County was part of Trumbull and Columbiana counties until 1846, when the counties were redefined and Mahoning County was established as a new county. Mahoning County is part of the Youngstown–Warren, OH Metropolitan Statistical Area.

== History ==
In the year 1600, Mahoning County was likely divided between two nations of Native Americans, the Erie people in the east and the Whittlesey culture in the west. It is unknown where the actual boundaries between these cultures lay, though the nearest confirmed Whittlesey settlement was at Cleveland, and the nearest confirmed Erie settlement was just barely across the Ohio-Pennsylvania border, in Ashtabula County. The Erie were an Iroquoian people who likely arrived sometime between the years 1100–1300 AD, after chasing out an older nation of "Mound Builders." The Whittlesey were likely Algonquian but lived in longhouses rather than the traditional Algonquian wigwams.

Following the Beaver Wars, when the Iroquois Confederacy declared war on many of the tribes of the Great Lakes region over several decades and destroyed them, new tribes moved into this area. The tribes who shared the resources of the Mahoning Valley included the Seneca, Lenape (Delaware), Shawnee, and Wyandot. The Seneca and Wyandot were Iroquoians, and the Lenape and Shawnee were Algonquians. As northeast Ohio later came to be under control of the settlers as part of the Connecticut Western Reserve, all tribes were pushed further westward or southward, before eventually being removed from Ohio by the United States in the early-mid 1800s.

Some former known Native American sites that existed in Mahoning County include the council rock and the North Benton burial mound. Council Rock was where the Shawnee and Lenape were known to gather for collective holiday celebrations, religion ceremonies and political meetings and once sat in the center of Youngstown. Though the rock was moved long ago, it still rests in what is now Lincoln Park. The North Benton burial mound was once located on the outskirts of North Benton and was removed by archeologists. It was attributed to the Hopewell culture, but contained unique features, such as sculptures of constellations made of white rocks and clay laid out at ground level and a pit full of mixed human bones in one corner. It shared features with two other burial mounds found and excavated in Kent, Ohio and Warren, Pennsylvania represents a completely unique style of burial mound in Ohio.

Prior to its formation of a county in 1846, Mahoning County was a destination for a family of Huguenot refugees in the early 1800s.

In the 1900s, Youngstown was a hub for the American steel industry and for local mob groups, who gained their power through the liquor and gambling industries during prohibition, remaining a key safety issue for the region until the 1990s. It was also the home to Warner Theatre, where the Warner Bros. film studio got its start and remained a hub for early film and television for decades. An extensive German community used to exist in the township of Berlin, until pressure to fully assimilate after the World Wars against Germany ended it. Brier Hill Pizza was invented in Youngstown's Brier Hill neighborhood and is considered a local delicacy.

== Geography ==
According to the United States Census Bureau, the county has an area of 425 square miles (1,100 km^{2}), of which 412 square miles (1,070 km^{2}) is land and 14 square miles (36 km^{2}) (3.2%) is water.

=== Adjacent counties ===
- Trumbull County (north)
- Mercer County, Pennsylvania (northeast)
- Lawrence County, Pennsylvania (east)
- Columbiana County (south)
- Stark County (southwest)
- Portage County (northwest)

=== Major highways ===
- I-76
- I-76 / Ohio Turnpike
- I-80 / Ohio Turnpike
- I-80
- I-680
- US 62
- US 224
- US 422
- SR 7
- SR 11
- SR 14
- SR 45
- SR 46
- SR 164
- SR 165
- SR 170
- SR 193
- SR 289
- SR 446
- SR 534
- SR 616
- SR 617
- SR 625
- SR 626
- SR 630

== Demographics ==
Historical population
Census	Pop.	Note	%±
1850	23,735		—
1860	25,894		9.1%
1870	31,001		19.7%
1880	42,871		38.3%
1890	55,979		30.6%
1900	70,134		25.3%
1910	116,151		65.6%
1920	186,310		60.4%
1930	236,142		26.7%
1940	240,251		1.7%
1950	257,629		7.2%
1960	300,480		16.6%
1970	303,424		1.0%
1980	289,487		−4.6%
1990	264,806		−8.5%
2000	257,555		−2.7%
2010	238,823		−7.3%
2020	228,614		−4.3%
2025 (est.)	224,706	▼	−1.7%
U.S. Decennial Census; 1790–1960 1900–1990; 1990–2000 2010–2020

A pyramid showing the age distribution of the county.

The county has shrunk in population, after peaking around 1970.

=== 2020 census ===
As of the 2020 census, the county had a population of 228,614. The median age was 44.2 years. 19.7% of residents were under the age of 18 and 22.2% of residents were 65 years of age or older. For every 100 females there were 94.6 males, and for every 100 females age 18 and over there were 92.1 males.

The racial makeup of the county was 75.6% White, 15.2% Black or African American, 0.2% American Indian and Alaska Native, 0.9% Asian, <0.1% Native Hawaiian and Pacific Islander, 2.2% from some other race, and 5.9% from two or more races. Hispanic or Latino residents of any race comprised 6.2% of the population.

84.4% of residents lived in urban areas, while 15.6% lived in rural areas.

There were 97,912 households in the county, of which 24.6% had children under the age of 18 living in them. Of all households, 40.2% were married-couple households, 20.7% were households with a male householder and no spouse or partner present, and 32.3% were households with a female householder and no spouse or partner present. About 34.2% of all households were made up of individuals and 15.7% had someone living alone who was 65 years of age or older.

There were 107,989 housing units, of which 9.3% were vacant. Among occupied housing units, 68.3% were owner-occupied and 31.7% were renter-occupied. The homeowner vacancy rate was 1.6% and the rental vacancy rate was 10.2%.

=== Racial and ethnic composition ===
Mahoning County, Ohio – Racial and ethnic composition Note: the US Census treats Hispanic/Latino as an ethnic category. This table excludes Latinos from the racial categories and assigns them to a separate category. Hispanics/Latinos may be of any race.
Race / Ethnicity (NH = Non-Hispanic)	Pop. 1980	Pop. 1990	Pop. 2000	Pop. 2010	Pop. 2020	% 1980	% 1990	% 2000	% 2010	% 2020
White alone (NH)	241,706	218,122	204,969	185,230	169,090	83.49%	82.37%	79.58%	77.56%	73.96%
Black or African American alone (NH)	40,778	39,213	40,270	36,400	33,770	14.09%	14.81%	15.64%	15.24%	14.77%
Native American or Alaska Native alone (NH)	325	409	378	392	332	0.11%	0.15%	0.15%	0.16%	0.15%
Asian alone (NH)	701	962	1,203	1,647	1,952	0.24%	0.36%	0.47%	0.69%	0.85%
Native Hawaiian or Pacific Islander alone (NH)	x (Note: Included in the Asian category in the 1980 Census.)	x (Note: Included in the Asian category in the 1990 Census.)	54	36	59	x	x	0.02%	0.02%	0.03%
Other race alone (NH)	595	154	237	249	708	0.21%	0.06%	0.09%	0.10%	0.31%
Mixed race or Multiracial (NH)	x (Note: Not an option in the 1980 Census.)	x (Note: Not an option in the 1990 Census.)	2,804	3,733	8,610	x	x	1.09%	1.56%	3.77%
Hispanic or Latino (any race)	5,382	5,946	7,640	11,136	14,093	1.86%	2.25%	2.97%	4.66%	6.16%
Total	289,487	264,806	257,555	238,823	228,614	100.00%	100.00%	100.00%	100.00%	100.00%

=== 2010 census ===
As of the 2010 census, there were 238,823 people, 98,712 households, and 62,676 families living in the county. The population density was 580.2 inhabitants per square mile (224.0/km^{2}). There were 111,833 housing units at an average density of 271.7 units per square mile (104.9 units/km^{2}). The racial makeup of the county was 79.9% white, 15.7% black or African American, 0.7% Asian, 0.2% American Indian, 1.4% from other races, and 2.1% from two or more races. Those of Hispanic or Latino origin made up 4.7% of the population. In terms of ancestry, 21.4% were German, 18.4% were Italian, 16.6% were Irish, 8.9% were English, and 4.2% were American.

Of the 98,712 households, 27.9% had children under the age of 18 living with them, 43.7% were married couples living together, 15.0% had a female householder with no husband present, 36.5% were non-families, and 31.8% of all households were made up of individuals. The average household size was 2.34 and the average family size was 2.94. The median age was 42.9 years.

The median income for a household in the county was $40,123 and the median income for a family was $52,489. Males had a median income of $44,516 versus $31,969 for females. The per capita income for the county was $22,824. About 12.6% of families and 16.6% of the population were below the poverty line, including 25.9% of those under age 18 and 10.0% of those age 65 or over.

=== 2000 census ===
As of the census of 2000, there were 257,555 people, 102,587 households, and 68,835 families living in the county. The population density was 620 inhabitants per square mile (240/km^{2}). There were 111,762 housing units at an average density of 269 units per square mile (104 units/km^{2}). The racial makeup of the county was 81.04% White, 15.87% Black or African American, 0.17% Native American, 0.47% Asian, 0.02% Pacific Islander, 1.03% from other races, and 1.38% from two or more races. 2.97% of the population were Hispanic or Latino of any race.

93.1% spoke English, 2.6% Spanish, 1.0% Italian, and 0.5% Greek as their first language.

There were 102,587 households, out of which 28.40% had children under the age of 18 living with them, 49.00% were married couples living together, 14.10% had a female householder with no husband present, and 32.90% were non-families. 29.10% of all households were made up of individuals, and 13.10% had someone living alone who was 65 years of age or older. The average household size was 2.44 and the average family size was 3.02.

In the county, the population was spread out, with 23.70% under the age of 18, 8.40% from 18 to 24, 26.40% from 25 to 44, 23.70% from 45 to 64, and 17.80% who were 65 years of age or older. The median age was 40 years. For every 100 females there were 91.40 males. For every 100 females age 18 and over, there were 88.00 males.

The median income for a household in the county was $35,248, and the median income for a family was $44,185. Males had a median income of $36,313 versus $23,272 for females. The per capita income for the county was $18,818. About 9.60% of families and 12.50% of the population were below the poverty line, including 19.10% of those under age 18 and 8.70% of those age 65 or over.

== Economy ==
=== Top employers ===
According to the county's 2019 Comprehensive Annual Financial Report, the top employers in the county are:

#	Employer	# of Employees
1	Mercy Health	3,000
2	Youngstown City School District	1,791
3	Mahoning County	1,600
4	Youngstown State University	1,200
5	VXI Global Solutions	1,100
6	City of Youngstown	1,063
7	Infocision Management	1,050
8	Windsor House Assisted Living	850
9	Austintown Local School District	800
10	Akron Children's Hospital	800

== Government and politics ==
2020 presidential election by township and city Biden: 60–70% 70–80% Trump: 50–60% 60–70% 70–80%

Ohio law defines a structure for county government. Mahoning County has a three-member board of county commissioners, a sheriff, coroner, auditor, treasurer, clerk of the court of common pleas, prosecutor, engineer, and recorder. Mahoning County is represented as part of Ohio's 58th and 59th state house districts, and Ohio's 33rd senatorial district. It is also included in the Ohio Seventh District Court of Appeals. Federally, it is part of Ohio's 6th congressional district.

From its creation through the 1930s, Mahoning County favored the Republican Party, only voting for the Democratic Party nominee three times to that point. From 1936 through 2016, it became reliably Democratic-leaning and selected the Republican nominee only twice, in 1956 and 1972. It has only voted Republican three times at the gubernatorial level since 1970 – in the landslide elections of 1994, 2014, and 2022.

In 2016, Hillary Clinton won Mahoning County over Donald Trump by 3.3 percent, the smallest margin since 1972; in 2012, Barack Obama carried the county over Mitt Romney by a larger 28.3 percent (63.52 to 35.15, respectively). However, in 2020, Donald Trump won the county by a narrow majority. Andrew Gumbell of The Observer stated that Trump gained popularity from 2017 to 2020 even though the Youngstown economy declined in the same period; Trump in 2017 made statements saying that he will revive the area economically. Trump flipped the county Republican for the first time since Richard Nixon's national landslide victory in 1972, carrying it by a margin of 1.9 percentage points. Trump won the county by a larger margin of 9 points in 2024; Gumbell cited "disillusioned working-class voters" and their feelings for the rising popularity of Trump in the area, as the voters believed that Trump would abolish a system that disadvantages them despite not believing that Trump would "fix everything or believe him when he says he will."

United States presidential election results for Mahoning County, Ohio (Note: The leading "other" candidate, Progressive Theodore Roosevelt, received 5,226 votes, while Socialist candidate Eugene Debs received 2,422 votes, Prohibition candidate Eugene Chafin received 321 votes, and Socialist Labor candidate Arthur Reimer received 57 votes.)
Year	Republican		Democratic		Third party(ies)	
Year	No.	%	No.	%	No.	%
1856	2,323	54.16%	1,937	45.16%	29	0.68%
1860	2,907	57.51%	1,990	39.37%	158	3.13%
1864	3,044	55.71%	2,420	44.29%	0	0.00%
1868	3,387	55.13%	2,757	44.87%	0	0.00%
1872	3,757	59.13%	2,518	39.63%	79	1.24%
1876	3,921	48.47%	3,691	45.62%	478	5.91%
1880	4,943	53.33%	4,044	43.63%	282	3.04%
1884	6,007	55.59%	4,432	41.01%	367	3.40%
1888	6,162	51.31%	5,337	44.44%	511	4.25%
1892	5,806	45.54%	6,358	49.87%	586	4.60%
1896	8,529	55.27%	6,772	43.88%	131	0.85%
1900	8,939	53.57%	7,402	44.36%	345	2.07%
1904	10,404	59.97%	4,436	25.57%	2,510	14.47%
1908	10,760	51.18%	9,312	44.29%	951	4.52%
1912	5,839	28.20%	6,838	33.03%	8,026	38.77%
1916	11,256	44.62%	13,013	51.59%	956	3.79%
1920	29,736	63.85%	14,941	32.08%	1,893	4.06%
1924	37,647	68.12%	9,335	16.89%	8,282	14.99%
1928	48,341	63.82%	26,928	35.55%	479	0.63%
1932	39,713	52.35%	33,139	43.68%	3,009	3.97%
1936	24,825	27.32%	64,886	71.41%	1,147	1.26%
1940	37,496	32.91%	76,441	67.09%	0	0.00%
1944	35,184	33.42%	70,102	66.58%	0	0.00%
1948	37,365	36.94%	62,468	61.76%	1,313	1.30%
1952	53,164	43.98%	67,722	56.02%	0	0.00%
1956	63,992	51.98%	59,126	48.02%	0	0.00%
1960	51,927	38.73%	82,143	61.27%	0	0.00%
1964	33,775	27.08%	90,934	72.92%	0	0.00%
1968	42,948	34.75%	68,433	55.38%	12,197	9.87%
1972	64,144	49.69%	62,428	48.36%	2,516	1.95%
1976	46,314	36.96%	75,837	60.53%	3,143	2.51%
1980	50,153	40.07%	63,677	50.88%	11,331	9.05%
1984	53,424	40.65%	76,514	58.21%	1,500	1.14%
1988	43,722	36.40%	75,524	62.87%	880	0.73%
1992	31,191	24.82%	64,731	51.52%	29,728	23.66%
1996	31,397	26.57%	72,716	61.53%	14,065	11.90%
2000	40,460	35.45%	69,212	60.65%	4,447	3.90%
2004	48,761	36.69%	83,194	62.60%	949	0.71%
2008	45,319	35.50%	79,173	62.02%	3,167	2.48%
2012	42,641	35.07%	77,059	63.38%	1,884	1.55%
2016	53,616	46.23%	57,381	49.48%	4,974	4.29%
2020	59,903	50.26%	57,641	48.36%	1,646	1.38%
2024	61,249	54.09%	50,636	44.72%	1,348	1.19%

United States Senate election results for Mahoning County, Ohio1
Year	Republican		Democratic		Third party(ies)	
Year	No.	%	No.	%	No.	%
2024	54,067	48.49%	53,847	48.29%	3,585	3.22%

== Education ==
=== Colleges and universities ===
- Avalon University School of Medicine
- Youngstown State University

=== Community, junior, and technical colleges ===
- Choffin Career and Technical Center
- Mahoning County Career and Technical Center

=== Public school districts ===
School districts include:

- Alliance City School District
- Austintown Local School District
- Boardman Local School District
- Campbell City School District
- Canfield Local School District
- Columbiana Exempted Village School District
- Girard City School District
- Hubbard Exempted Village School District
- Jackson-Milton Local School District
- Leetonia Exempted Village School District
- Lowellville Local School District
- Poland Local School District
- Sebring Local School District
- South Range Local School District
- Springfield Local School District
- Struthers City School District
- Weathersfield Local School District
- West Branch Local School District
- Western Reserve Local School District
- Youngstown City School District

==== High schools ====
- Austintown Fitch High School
- Boardman High School
- Campbell Memorial High School
- Canfield High School
- Cardinal Mooney High School
- Chaney High School
- East High School
- Jackson-Milton High School
- Lowellville High School
- Mahoning County Career & Technical Center
- Mahoning County High School
- McKinley High School
- Poland Seminary High School
- South Range High School
- Springfield High School
- Struthers High School
- Ursuline High School
- Valley Christian School
- Valley STEM + ME2 Academy
- West Branch High School
- Western Reserve High School

== Communities ==
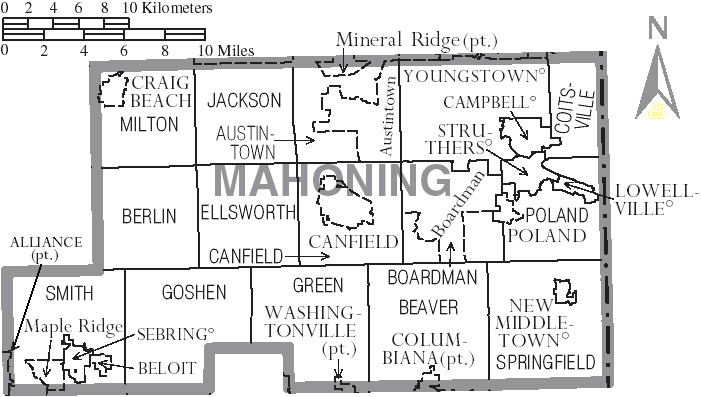
Map of Mahoning County, Ohio with municipal and township labels

=== Cities ===
- Alliance (part)
- Campbell
- Canfield
- Columbiana (part)
- Salem (part)
- Struthers
- Youngstown (part) (county seat)

=== Villages ===
- Beloit
- Craig Beach
- Lowellville
- New Middletown
- Poland
- Sebring
- Washingtonville (part)

=== Townships ===
- Austintown
- Beaver
- Berlin
- Boardman
- Canfield
- Coitsville
- Ellsworth
- Goshen
- Green
- Jackson
- Milton
- Poland
- Smith
- Springfield

=== Census-designated places ===
- Austintown
- Damascus (part)
- East Alliance
- Lake Milton
- Maple Ridge
- Mineral Ridge (part)
- New Springfield
- North Lima
- Petersburg
- Woodworth

=== Unincorporated communities ===
- Berlin Center
- Blanco
- Calla
- Coitsville Center
- East Lewistown
- Ellsworth
- Fredericksburg
- Garfield
- Greenford
- Hickory Corners
- Knaufville
- Locust Grove
- New Albany
- New Buffalo
- North Benton
- North Jackson
- Ohltown
- Paradise
- Patmos
- Poland Center
- Rosemont
- Snodes
- West Austintown

=== Population ranking ===
The population ranking of the following table is based on the 2020 census of Mahoning County.

* minority of municipality located in Mahoning County
† county seat

Rank	City/Town/ etc.	Population (2010 Census)	Municipal Type
1	† Youngstown	60,068	City
2	Austintown	29,594	CDP
3	Alliance*	21,672	City
4	Salem*	11,915	City
5	Struthers	10,063	City
6	Campbell	7,852	City
7	Canfield	7,699	City
8	Columbiana*	6,559	City
9	Sebring	4,191	Village
10	Mineral Ridge*	3,951	CDP
11	Poland	2,463	Village
12	Woodworth	1,784	CDP
13	New Middletown	1,507	Village
14	North Lima	1,369	CDP
15	Craig Beach	1,076	Village
16	Lowellville	996	Village
17	Beloit	903	Village
18	Washingtonville*	712	Village
19	Maple Ridge	667	CDP
20	Lake Milton	637	CDP
21	New Springfield	579	CDP
22	Damascus	418	CDP
23	Petersburg	405	CDP
24	East Alliance	268	CDP

== See also ==
- National Register of Historic Places listings in Mahoning County, Ohio
