= New Buffalo, Ohio =

- Unincorporated community
- Location within Ohio Location within the United States
- Coordinates: 40°59′17″N 80°42′44″W
- Country: United States
- State: Ohio
- County: Mahoning
- Townships: Beaver, Boardman, Canfield
- Established: 1877
- Time zone: EST

New Buffalo is an unincorporated community in Mahoning County, in the U.S. state of Ohio. The center of the community is at the meeting point of three townships: Canfield, Boardman, and Beaver.

== History ==
A post office called New Buffalo was established in 1877, and remained in operation until 1902. Besides the post office, New Buffalo had a country store.
