= Canfield Local School District =

School district in Ohio, United States

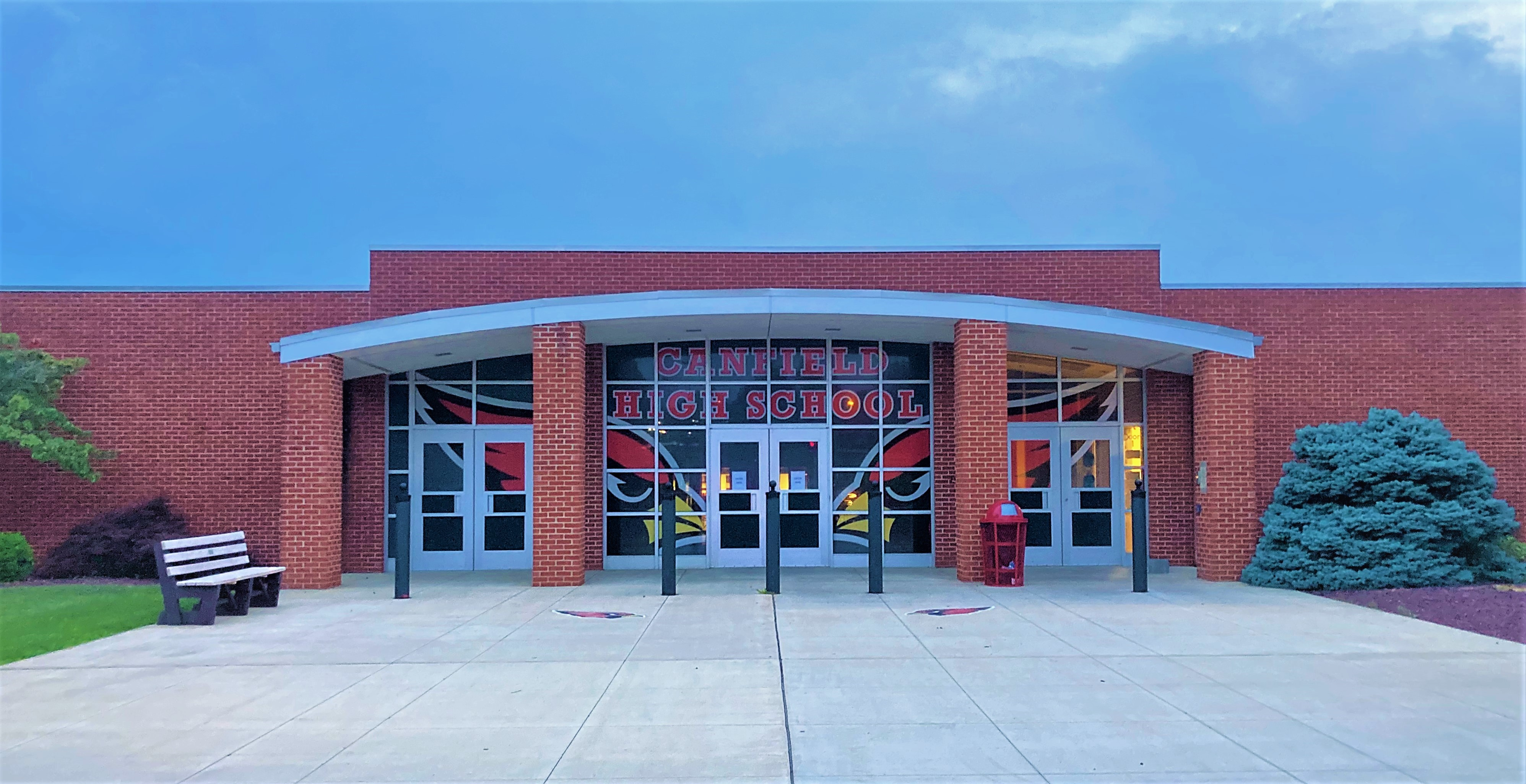
- Canfield High School entrance

Address
- 100 Wadsworth St Canfield, Ohio, 44406; United States

District information
- Type: Public
- Grades: K–12
- Accreditation: Ohio Department of Education
- NCES District ID: 3904831

Students and staff
- Enrollment: 2,453 (2024–25)
- Staff: 150.21 (FTE)
- Student–teacher ratio: 16.33
- District mascot: Cardinals
- Colors: Red and Black

Other information
- Website: https://www.canfieldschools.net/

The Canfield Local School District is a school district located in Mahoning County, Ohio. It serves students in grades K-12 living in Canfield, Ellsworth, Green, Beaver and parts of Boardman townships. The district consists of one high school, one middle school and two elementary schools. All school buildings and offices are located in Canfield, Ohio.

== Schools ==
Schools within the district consist of:

=== High school ===
- Canfield High School

=== Middle school ===
- Canfield Village Middle School

=== Elementary school ===
- C.H. Campbell Elementary School
- Hilltop Elementary School
