= Greenford, Ohio =

- Unincorporated community
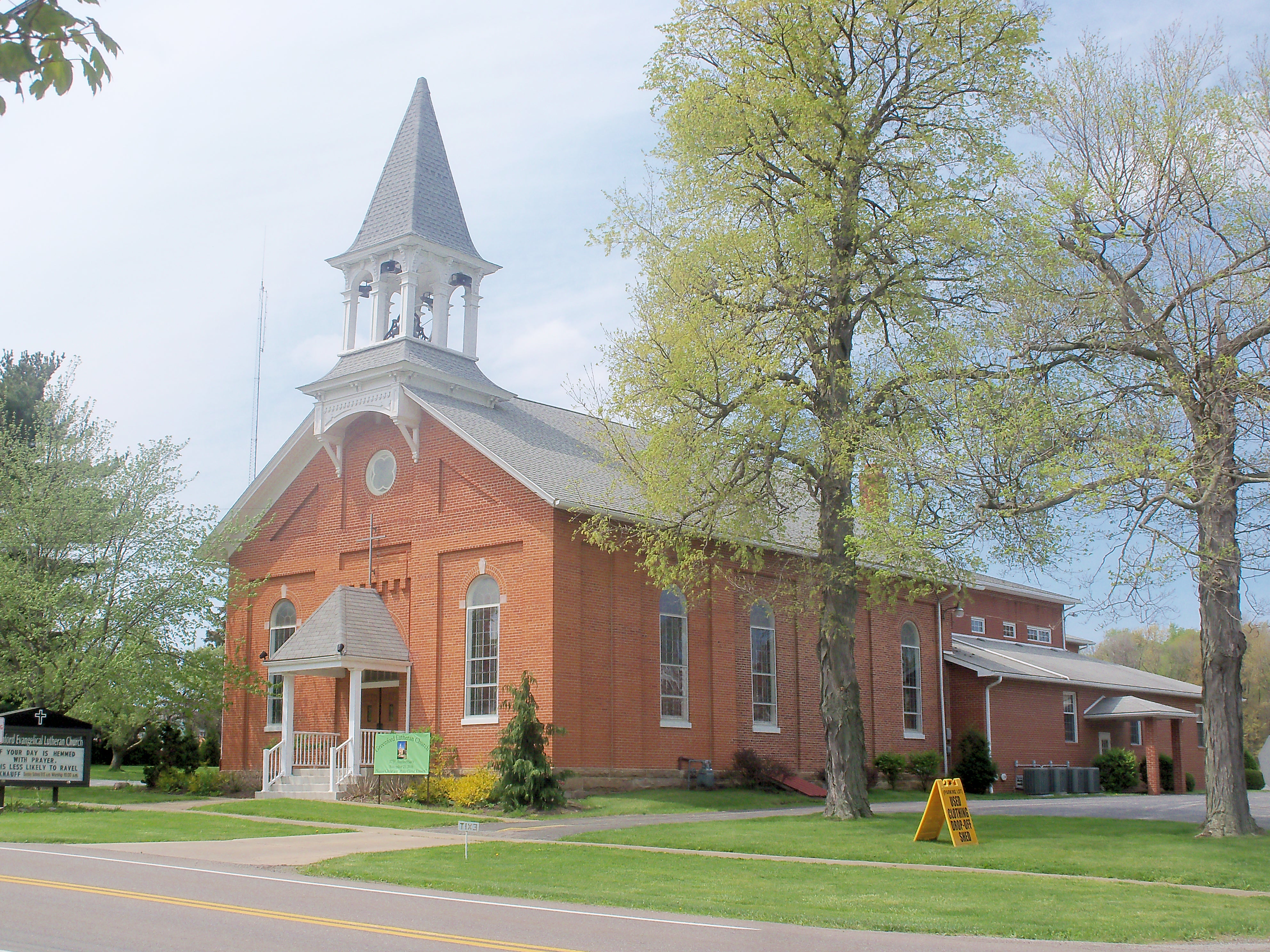
- Greenford Lutheran Church

- Location within Ohio Location within the United States
- Coordinates: 40°56′38″N 80°47′29″W
- Country: United States
- State: Ohio
- County: Mahoning
- Township: Green
- Elevation: 1,237 ft (377 m)
- Time zone: UTC-5 (Eastern (EST))
  - Summer (DST): UTC-4 (EDT)
- ZIP code: 44422
- Area codes: 330, 234
- GNIS feature ID: 1064756
- School District: South Range Local

Greenford is an unincorporated community in central Green Township, Mahoning County, Ohio, United States. The community lies along State Route 165 a short distance north of Salem. It is part of the Youngstown–Warren metropolitan area.

Greenford has a post office with the ZIP code 44422, in operation since 1829. The community takes its name from Green Township. Greenford has a public library, a branch of the Public Library of Youngstown and Mahoning County.

== History ==
Greenford is the largest community in Green Township. The area was first settled by people of German ancestry in the early 1800s. In its formation, Green Township and the area surrounding Greenford had been a series of farms and coal mines. As the population grew, schools and churches were built throughout the community.

== Education ==
In 1844, there were 12 schools throughout the entire township, and multiple churches serving different denominations. Greenford High School would later form with North Lima High School in 1969 to form what is now South Range High School. The old Greenford High School had been used as the Middle School for South Range, until 2010 when the new K-12 campus in Canfield opened.

== Politics ==
In the Ohio General Assembly, Greenford is located in the 33rd Senate District, represented by Michael Rulli (R), and in the 59th State Representative District, represented by Alessandro Cutrona (R).

== Notable person ==
- John V. Lewis (died 1913), member of the Ohio Senate
- Ty Votaw, former LPGA Tour commissioner
