= West Branch Local School District =

School district in Ohio, United States

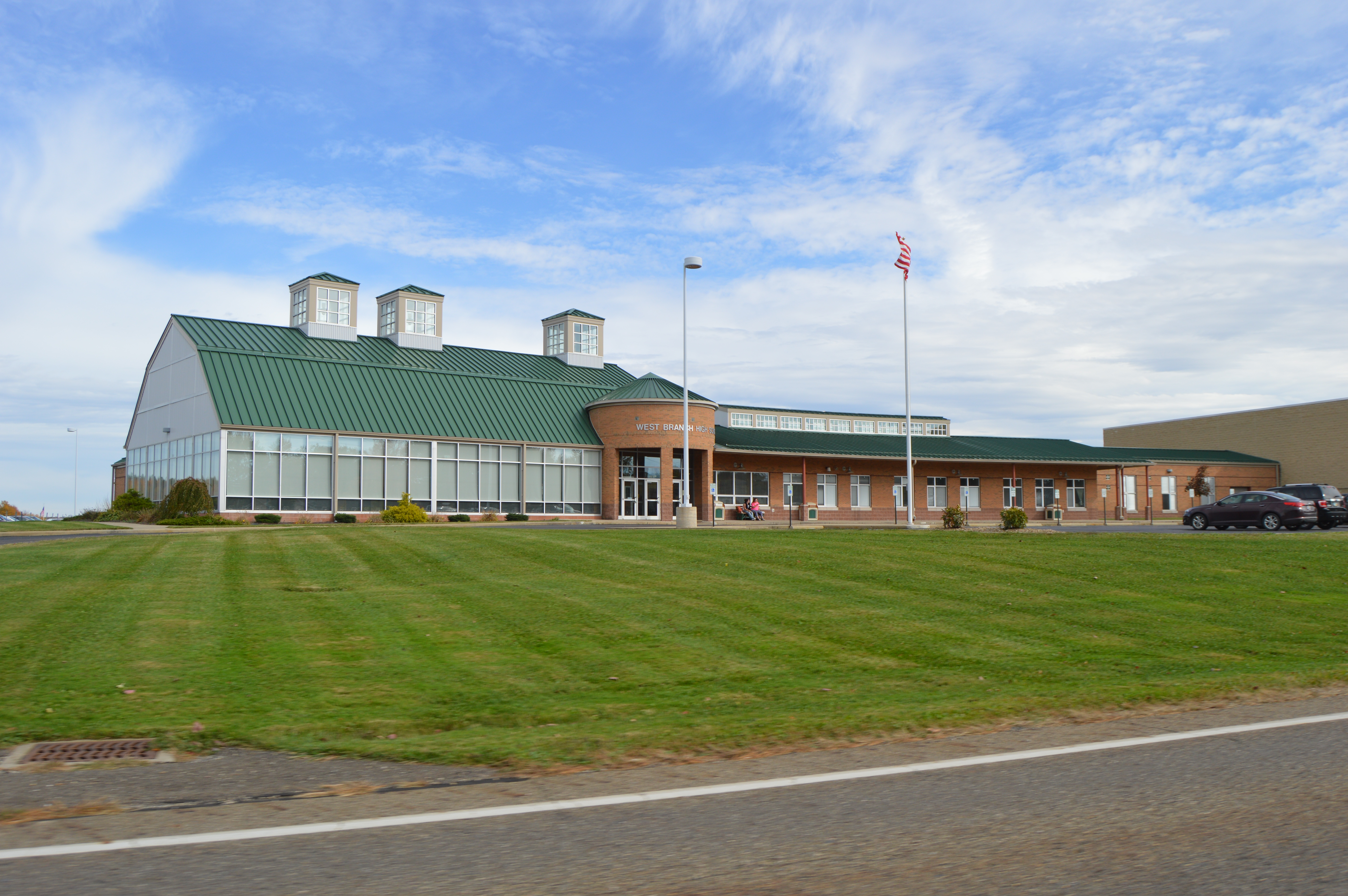
- West Branch High School

Address
- 14227 S Main St Beloit, Ohio, 44609; United States

District information
- Type: Public
- Grades: PK-12
- Superintendent: Mikki Egli
- Accreditation: Ohio Department of Education
- NCES District ID: 3904838

Students and staff
- Enrollment: 1,735 (2024–25)
- Staff: 108.04 (FTE)
- Student–teacher ratio: 16.06
- District mascot: Warriors
- Colors: Green and White

Other information
- Website: www.westbranch.k12.oh.us

The West Branch Local School District is a school district located in southeastern Mahoning County, Ohio and parts of Columbiana County and Stark County. The district serves students in grades Pre-K through twelve living in Beloit, Smith, Goshen, and parts of Knox and Butler, Salem, and Alliance. The district consists of one high school, one middle school, one elementary school and one preschool. The district offices, high school and middle school are located in Beloit, the elementary school is located in Salem, Ohio, and the preschool is located in Alliance, Ohio.

== History ==
The West Branch Local School District was formed in the mid 1900s, with the consolidation of smaller one-room schools in Beloit and surrounding townships.

The original West Branch High School was located at the current West Branch Early Learning Center on South Pricetown Rd in Salem, Ohio. It was later relocated to its current building in 1963.

In June 2001, West Branch faced an outbreak of bacterial meningitis that killed two high school students. A third student was hospitalized but survived the illness.

In 2023, the West Branch Intermediate School was closed, with 5th grade students moving back to an elementary schedule. Grades 3rd through 7th would later move to the middle school.

== Schools ==
=== High school ===
- West Branch High School

=== Middle school ===
- West Branch Middle School

=== Elementary school ===
- West Branch Early Learning Center

=== Preschool ===
- West Branch Preschool

=== Former schools ===
- West Branch Intermediate School
- Goshen Township School
