= John V. Lewis =

American politician and physician (died 1913)

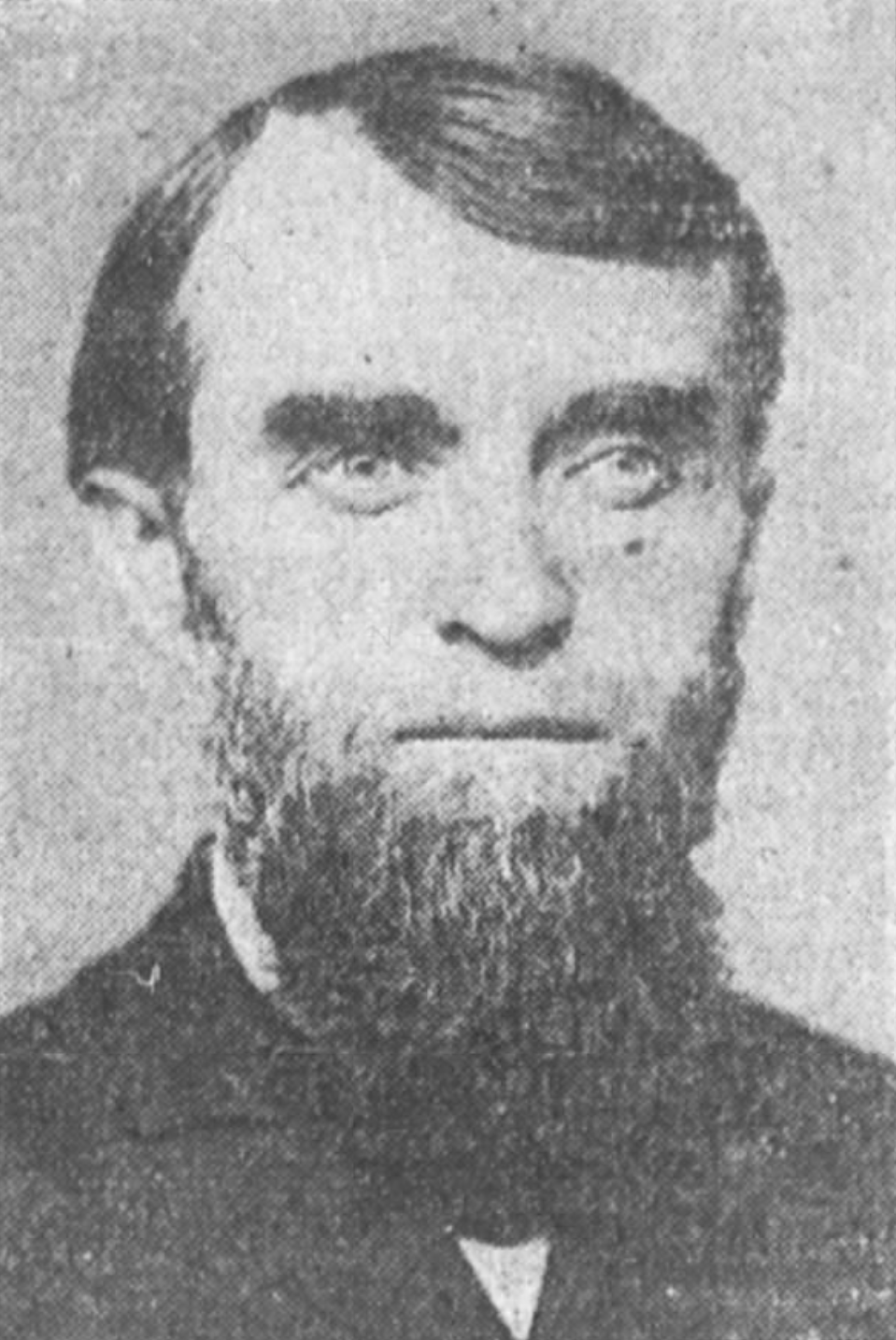
- Lewis in a 1913 newspaper

Member of the Ohio Senate from the 21st district
- In office 1884–1886
- Preceded by: Edwin Norman Hartshorn
- Succeeded by: Silas A. Conrad

Personal details
- Born: Greenford, Ohio, U.S.
- Died: January 16, 1913 (aged 77) Alliance, Ohio, U.S.
- Resting place: Alliance Cemetery
- Party: Democratic
- Education: Cincinnati Medical School
- Occupation: Politician; physician; educator

John V. Lewis (died January 16, 1913) was an American politician and physician from Ohio. He served in the Ohio Senate from 1884 to 1886.

== Early life ==
John V. Lewis was born in Greenford, Ohio. He received his education at schools in Canfield and Salem. He then became a teacher in Mahoning County. He studied medicine under Dr. Andrew Weikart. He then completed a medical course at Cincinnati Medical School.

== Career ==
After completing the course, Lewis moved back to Greenford. He then partnered with Dr. Weikart. In 1871, he moved to Alliance and worked there as a physician and surgeon. He retired from his medical practice around 1903.

Lewis was a Democrat. He served in the Ohio Senate, representing the 21st district from 1884 to 1886.

== Personal life ==
Lewis was married.

Lewis died on January 16, 1913, aged 77, at his home in Alliance. He was buried at Alliance Cemetery.

== Legacy ==
After his death, Lewis's library was donated to Union-Scio College as the Lewis Memorial and was placed in Chapman Hall.
