= Locust Grove, Mahoning County, Ohio =

Locust Grove, Ohio
- Unincorporated community
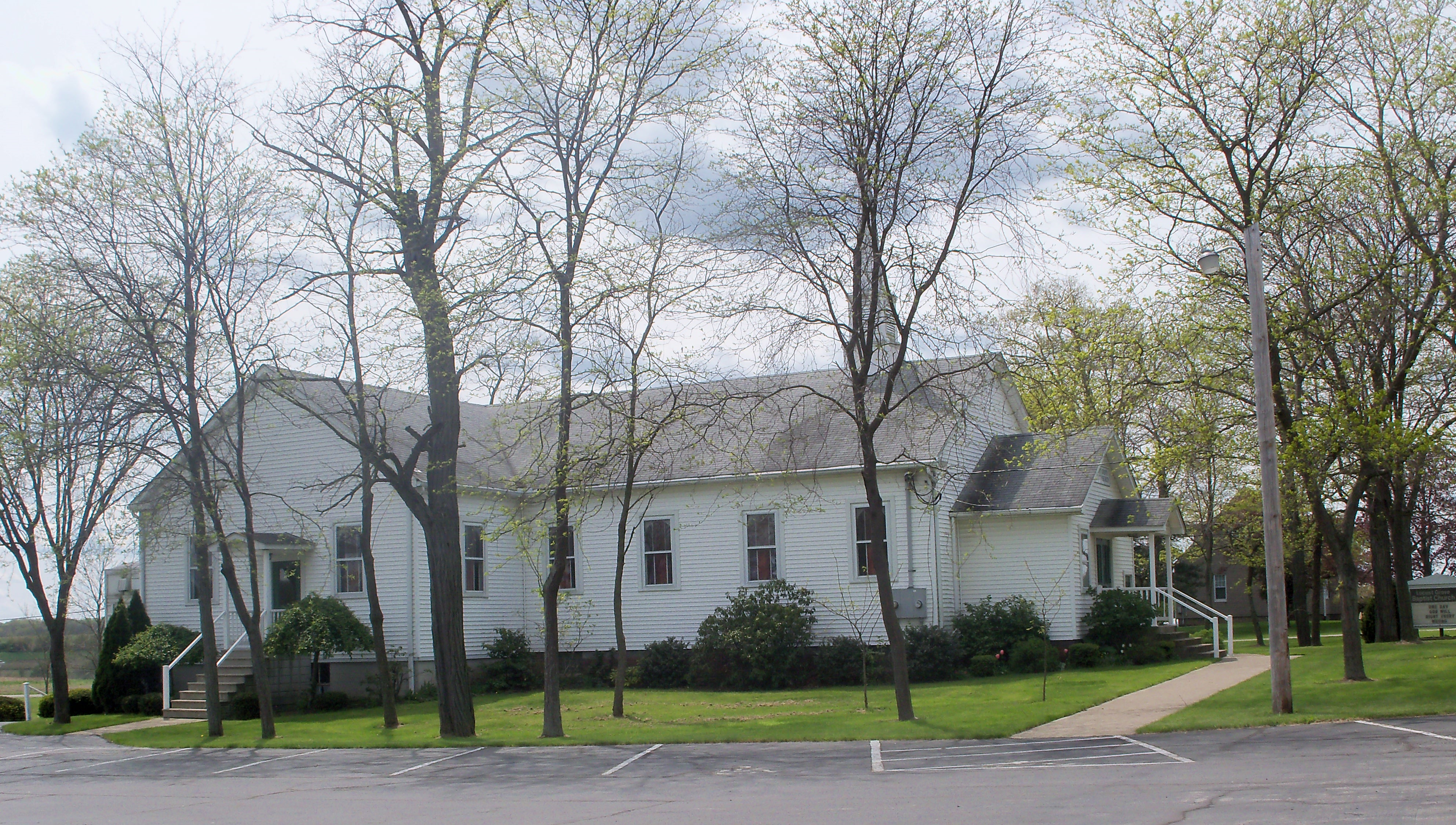
- Locust Grove Baptist Church

- Location within Ohio Location within the United States
- Coordinates: 40°56′38″N 80°45′50″W
- Country: United States
- State: Ohio
- County: Mahoning
- Township: Green
- Elevation: 1,237 ft (377 m)
- Time zone: UTC-5 (Eastern (EST))
  - Summer (DST): UTC-4 (EDT)
- ZIP Code: 44460 (Salem)
- Area codes: 234/330
- GNIS feature ID: 1042707

Locust Grove is an unincorporated community in Green Township, Mahoning County, Ohio, United States. Locust Grove is located on Ohio State Route 165, 12.3 miles (19.8 km) south-southwest of Youngstown.
