= Paradise, Ohio =

Unincorporated community in Ohio, U.S.

Coordinates: 40°58′25″N 80°42′27″W

Paradise is an unincorporated community in Beaver Township, Mahoning County, Ohio, United States.
