= Dru DeShields =

American football player (born 2004)

No. 12 – Kent State Golden Flashes
- Position: Quarterback
- Class: Redshirt Junior

Personal information
- Born: May 18, 2004 (age 22)
- Listed height: 6 ft 2 in (1.88 m)
- Listed weight: 195 lb (88 kg)

Career information
- High school: West Branch (Beloit, Ohio)
- College: Kent State (2023–present)
- Stats at ESPN

Dru DeShields (born May 18, 2004) is an American football quarterback for the Kent State Golden Flashes. DeShields redshirted his first two seasons due to injury. DeShields attended West Branch High School, where he threw for 7,834 yards and 90 touchdowns in his high school career.

== Personal life ==
Dru Deshields was born May 18, 2004. He is the brother of TJ DeShields who previously played for Akron as a quarterback, where he currently serves as an offensive analyst for his former team.

DeShields attended West Branch High School located in Beloit, Ohio, finishing his high school career with 33 wins, and completing 66% of his passes for 7,834 yards and 90 touchdowns.

== College career ==
After graduation, DeShields committed to play for the Kent State for football. He originally committed to Eastern Illinois, but later flipped his commitment.

During his first two seasons in 2023 and 2024, DeShields would redshirt and not appear in any games due to tearing his ACL in both seasons. He made his first career start in week three of the 2025 season, where he went 22-of-32 passing for 279 yards and two touchdowns, while adding a 37 yards and a touchdown on the ground in a 31-28 loss to Buffalo. After the Buffalo game, DeShields was named the team's starter for the rest of the season. In week twelve, DeShields completed 17 of his 25 pass attempts for 317 yards and five touchdowns in a victory versus rival Akron.

=== College statistics ===
Season	Team	Games			Passing								Rushing			
Season	Team	GP	GS	Record	Cmp	Att	Pct	Yds	Avg	TD	Int	Rtg	Att	Yds	Avg	TD
2023	Kent State	Did not play due to injury														
2024	Kent State	Did not play due to injury														
2025	Kent State	11	9	4–5	136	240	56.7	2,030	8.5	18	3	150.0	61	36	0.3	3
2026	Kent State	7	7	2–5	106	185	57.3	1,145	6.2	4	6	109.9	58	189	3.3	3
Career		18	16	6–10	242	425	56.9	3,175	7.5	22	9	132.5	119	225	1.9	6
