= Boardman Local School District =

Public school district in Ohio

Location
- 7777 Glenwood Avenue Boardman, Mahoning County, Ohio, 44512; United States

District information
- Type: Public
- Grades: K–12
- Established: 1918; 108 years ago
- Superintendent: Chris Neifer
- Schools: 6
- NCES District ID: 3904830

Students and staff
- Students: 3,515 (2024-25)
- Staff: 217.50
- Student–teacher ratio: 16.16
- District mascot: Spartan
- Colors: Maroon and White

Other information
- Website: https://www.boardman.k12.oh.us/

Boardman Local School District is a public school district serving students in Boardman Township, Ohio, United States. The school district consists of one high school, two middle schools, and three elementary schools.

== History ==
In 1899, township officials began to study the concept of centralization and consolidating schools into a single building. In February 1901, the issue of centralizing schools was placed before the electorate. The issue lost by a margin of 53 votes in favor and 44 against. The issue was later declared illegal, as the board of education learned it had the sole legal right to determine centralization.

On 18 April 1904, voters approved a resolution to establish a high school in Boardman. Prior to 1904, students attended eight one-room schoolhouses scattered throughout the township. Later that year, the first centralized school was built on Market Street near the site of the present Boardman Center Intermediate School.

Prior to the 1917-1918 school year, the district only offered two years of high school, with those wanting four years of high school education having to finish their studies in nearby Youngstown. By 1922, the district had established a music program, which to this day is highly acclaimed. In 1935, the high school adopted the nickname of Spartans after the name was submitted in a school newspaper contest.

By the early 1950s, the centralized school building had started to become overcrowded. In response, the board of education adopted a policy of decentralization of schools, which saw the construction of Market Street, West Boulevard, Stadium Drive, and Robinwood Lane elementary schools later in the decade and Glenwood Junior High School in 1961. In 1969, a new high school building was opened on Glenwood Avenue, replacing the original centralized school building on Market Street.

== Schools ==
=== High school ===
- Boardman High School

=== Middle schools ===
- Boardman Glenwood Junior High School (grades 7 and 8)
- Boardman Center Intermediate School (grades 4, 5, and 6)

=== Elementary schools ===
- Robinwood Lane Elementary School
- Stadium Drive Elementary School
- West Boulevard Elementary School

=== Former schools ===
- Market Street Elementary School was closed at the end of the 2018–2019 school year as part of cost saving measures. The building is in the process of being demolished to make way for a retention pond or rain garden.

There were eight original schoolhouses in Boardman, all of which were closed and consolidated into a centralized school on Market Street in 1904. They were:

- Chambers School
- Cornersburg School (located in Cornersburg)
- Gault School (located at the intersection of US-224 and West Boulevard)
- Heintzelman School (in the southwest portion of Boardman)
- Kipper's Corners School (located near the intersection of Shields Road and Market Street)
- Pleasant Grove School (located on South Avenue)
- Rice School (located in Woodworth)
- Shady Hollow School (located on Tippecanoe Road)
