= Ty Votaw =

American lawyer and golf executive (born 1962)

- Born: February 1962 (age 64); Greenford, Ohio, U.S.
- Education: Ohio University; University of North Carolina
- Occupations: Lawyer, golf executive
- Employer(s): LPGA (1991–2005); PGA Tour (2006–2022)
- Organization: International Golf Federation
- Spouse(s): Paula Keiffer (?–2006); Sophie Gustafson (2006–2010); Kelli Suire (2013–present)

Ty Votaw (born February 1962) is an American lawyer and golf executive.

== Career ==
Votaw worked in corporate law for a Cincinnati-based firm before joined the Ladies Professional Golf Association as general counsel in 1991. He served as its Commissioner from 1999 to 2005. In 2006 he was appointed Executive Vice President, International Affairs of the PGA Tour. In 2013, Votaw was named Executive Vice President and Chief Global Communications Officer for the PGA Tour, and in September 2014, was named the Tour's Chief Marketing Officer where he is responsible for all of the organization's communications, marketing, branding and advertising. Votaw also serves as Vice President of the International Golf Federation.

Votaw also coordinated the 2016 Olympic golf movement on behalf of the International Golf Federation's Olympic Golf Committee and other golf organizations around the world. Votaw served in a newly created position as executive director, IGF Olympic Golf Committee. Golf was subsequently included in the 2016 Summer Olympics. In June 2022, Votaw retired as Executive Vice President, International, of the PGA Tour.

== Personal life ==
Votaw was born in Greenford, Ohio. He graduated from Ohio University in 1984 with a degree in journalism and public relations and earned his J.D. degree at the University of North Carolina in 1987.

While Votaw was at the LPGA, he and tour golfer Sophie Gustafson became personally close, sparking press coverage because he was still married, though separated (since 2003) from his first wife, Paula Keiffer. The couple were married on June 16, 2006. They divorced in January 2010. As of 2013, Votaw was married to Kelli Suire.
