= North Benton, Ohio =

Unincorporated community in Ohio, U.S.

Coordinates: 40°59′06″N 81°00′45″W

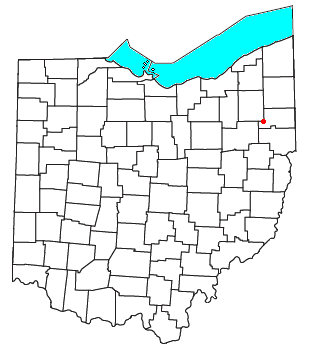
Location of North Benton, Ohio

North Benton is an unincorporated community in northern Smith Township, Mahoning County, Ohio, United States. It has a post office with the ZIP code 44449. It lies along State Route 14 between Salem and Ravenna.

The community is part of the Youngstown-Warren-Boardman, OH-PA Metropolitan Statistical Area.

== History ==
North Benton was platted in 1834 and was named for Thomas Hart Benton, senator from Missouri. The prefix North was added in order to avoid repetition with another Benton. A post office called North Benton has been in operation since 1835.
