= Edwin Norman Hartshorn =

American politician and educator (1835–1901)

Member of the Ohio Senate from the 21st district
- In office 1880–1884
- Preceded by: Johnson Sherrick
- Succeeded by: John V. Lewis

Personal details
- Born: May 27, 1835 Portage County, Ohio, U.S.
- Died: May 9, 1901 (aged 65) Cleveland, Ohio, U.S.
- Party: Republican
- Spouse: Alvira E. Allerton (m. 1858; died 1901)
- Children: 6
- Relatives: Orville Nelson Hartshorn (brother)
- Education: Mount Union College (MA)
- Occupation: Politician; educator

Edwin Norman Hartshorn (May 27, 1835 – May 9, 1901) was an American politician and educator from Ohio. He was a professor at Mount Union College from 1857 to 1868. He served in the Ohio Senate, representing the 21st district, from 1880 to 1884.

== Early life ==
Edwin Norman Hartshorn was born on May 27, 1835, in Portage County, Ohio, to Asenath (née Backus) and Norris Hartshorn. His father was a veteran of the War of 1812 and his maternal grandfather was a veteran of the Revolutionary War. In 1846, Hartshorn was one of the first students to study at Mount Union Seminary. He studied there until it became Mount Union College in January 1858. He then worked as a janitor for four years. Soon after the college was chartered, Hartshorn graduated from his scientific and classical courses in 1863. He then graduated with a Master of Arts. He also graduated from the business college of Duff's Commercial College in Pittsburgh with a degree in 1856.

== Career ==
In 1856, Hartshorn became one of the charter trustees of Mount Union College. He was elected as professor of natural science in 1857. In 1862, Hartshorn was elected as superintendent of the graded or union schools of Brownsville, Pennsylvania. After a short time, he returned to Mount Union College as trustee and professor. Until 1868, Hartsborn was a professor. He taught primarily natural science and mathematics, but also taught ancient classics, logic, rhetoric, political economy, and history. In 1868, Hartshorn became superintendent of the commercial department of Mount Union. He then taught bookkeeping, international and commercial law, and business. He was assistant treasurer of Mount Union for 14 years. He served as a member of the education board for union schools in Mount Union.

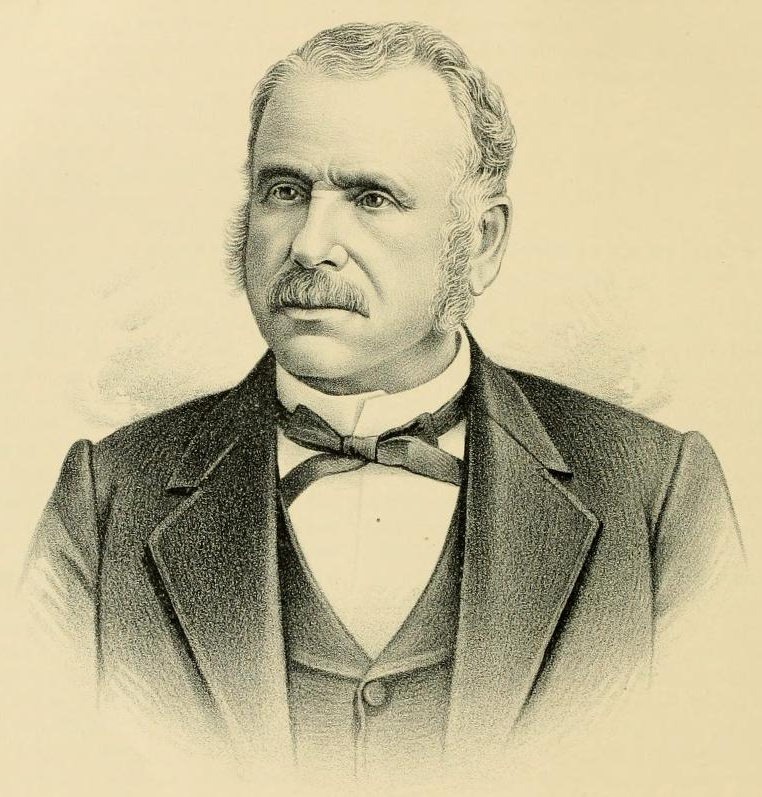
Robert S. Warwick in 1892 publication

Hartshorn was a Republican. He served as a member of the Ohio Senate, representing the 21st district (Stark and Carroll counties), from 1880 to 1884. He was chairman of educational committees in the senate. He defeated Robert S. Warwick in a state senate election.

Hartshorn served as deputy second comptroller of the U.S. Department of Treasury for four years under President Benjamin Harrison. At that time, he lived in Washington, D.C.

== Personal life ==
Hartshorn married Alvira E. Allerton, a descendent of Isaac Allerton, of Alliance on January 1, 1858. His wife died in March 1901. They had six children, Loyal Douglas, Carrie T., Wilber A., Jessie G., Gertrude Josephine and Florence. He was a Methodist. His older brother Orville Nelson Hartshorn was president of Mount Union College.

Hartshorn built a brick residence at 1690 South Union Avenue in Alliance that would later serve as a fraternity house. He died on May 9, 1901, at Lakeside Hospital in Cleveland.
