= Maple Ridge, Ohio =

- Census-designated place
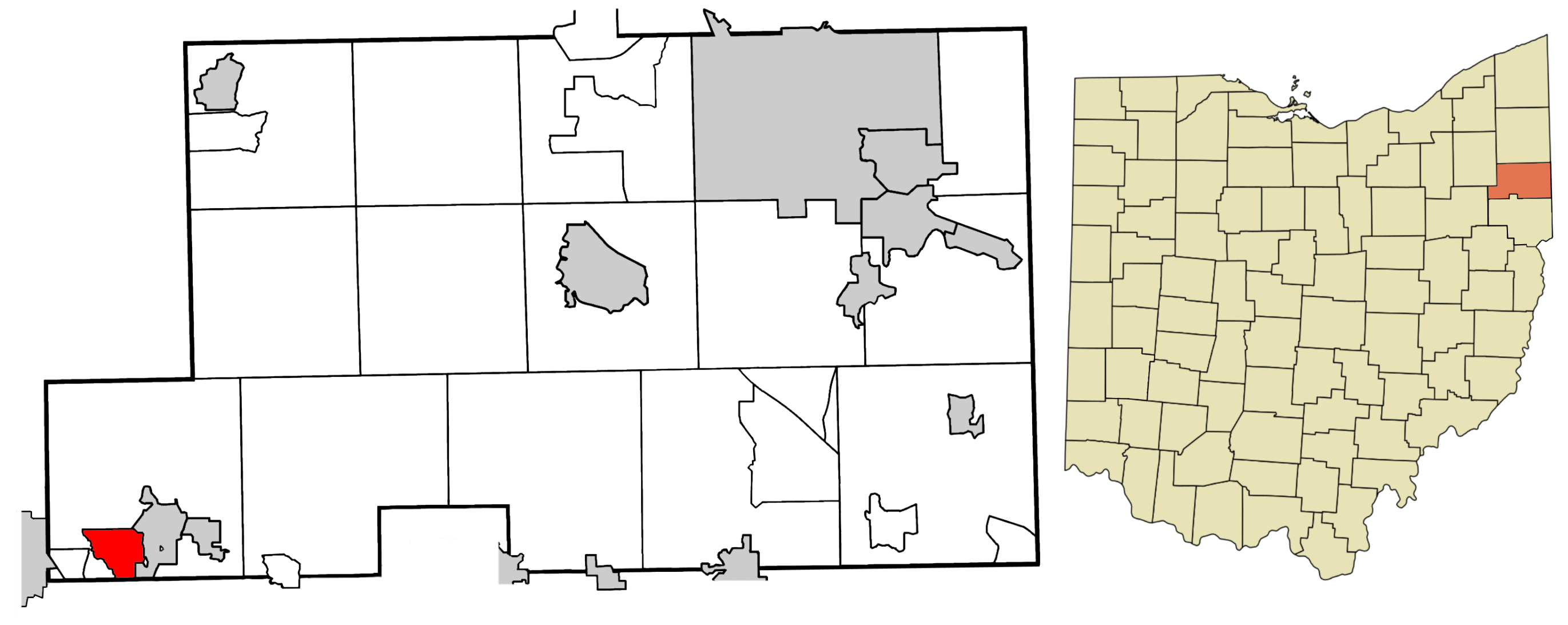
- Location in Mahoning County, Ohio

- Location within Ohio Location within the United States
- Coordinates: 40°54′51″N 81°02′49″W
- Country: United States
- State: Ohio
- County: Mahoning
- Township: Smith

Area
  - Total: 1.90 sq mi (4.91 km^{2})
  - Land: 1.84 sq mi (4.77 km^{2})
  - Water: 0.054 sq mi (0.14 km^{2})
- Elevation: 1,070 ft (330 m)

Population (2020)
  - Total: 667
  - Density: 362.1/sq mi (139.81/km^{2})
- Time zone: UTC-5 (Eastern (EST))
  - Summer (DST): UTC-4 (EDT)
- ZIP Codes: 44601 (Alliance); 44672 (Sebring)
- FIPS code: 39-47362
- GNIS feature ID: 2393119

Maple Ridge is a census-designated place in southwestern Mahoning County, Ohio, United States, located between Alliance and Sebring. The population was 667 at the 2020 census. It is part of the Youngstown–Warren metropolitan area.

== Geography ==
According to the United States Census Bureau, the CDP has a total area of 1.89 square miles (4.9 km^{2}), of which 1.85 square miles (4.8 km^{2}) is land and 0.04 square miles (0.1 km^{2}), or 3.00%, is water.

== Demographics ==
Historical population
| Census | Pop. | Note | %± |
|---|---|---|---|
| 2000 | 910 | | — |
| 2010 | 761 | | −16.4% |
| 2020 | 667 | | −12.4% |
U.S. Decennial Census

The population was 761 at the 2010 census.

As of the census of 2000, there were 910 people, 356 households, and 264 families residing in the CDP. The population density was 452.5 inhabitants per square mile (174.7/km^{2}). There were 373 housing units at an average density of 185.5 per square mile (71.6/km^{2}). The racial makeup of the CDP was 98.79% White, 0.66% African American, 0.22% Native American and 0.33% Asian. Hispanic or Latino of any race were 0.33% of the population.

There were 356 households, out of which 31.5% had children under the age of 18 living with them, 57.6% were married couples living together, 9.6% had a female householder with no husband present, and 25.6% were non-families. 20.2% of all households were made up of individuals, and 9.8% had someone living alone who was 65 years of age or older. The average household size was 2.56 and the average family size was 2.94.

In the CDP the population was spread out, with 25.2% under the age of 18, 7.0% from 18 to 24, 28.5% from 25 to 44, 24.5% from 45 to 64, and 14.8% who were 65 years of age or older. The median age was 40 years. For every 100 females there were 91.6 males. For every 100 females age 18 and over, there were 90.8 males.

The median income for a household in the CDP was $27,083, and the median income for a family was $31,875. Males had a median income of $27,045 versus $14,716 for females. The per capita income for the CDP was $15,750. About 2.8% of families and 5.8% of the population were below the poverty line, including 14.1% of those under age 18 and none of those age 65 or over.
