= Snodes, Ohio =

Unincorporated community in Ohio, U.S.

Coordinates: 40°57′33″N 80°59′37″W

Snodes is an unincorporated community in Mahoning County, in the U.S. state of Ohio.

== History ==
A post office called Snodes was established in 1886, and remained in operation until 1915. Besides the post office, Snodes had a station on the Pennsylvania Railroad.
