= Rosemont, Ohio =

Unincorporated community in Ohio, U.S.

Coordinates: 41°03′48″N 80°53′11″W

Rosemont is an unincorporated community in Mahoning County, in the U.S. state of Ohio.

== History ==
A post office called Rosemont was established in 1888, and remained in operation until 1928. Besides the post office, Rosemont had a country store, operated by D. L. Rose. Early industries at Rosemont included two mills and two coal mines.
