= Patmos, Ohio =

Unincorporated community in Ohio, U.S.

Coordinates: 40°58′25″N 80°54′21″W

Patmos is an unincorporated community in Mahoning County, in the U.S. state of Ohio.

== History ==
Patmos had its start when John Templin opened a store there in 1850. The community was named after the hymn "Patmos". A post office called Patmos was established in 1851, and remained in operation until 1901.
