= New Albany, Mahoning County, Ohio =

Unincorporated community in Ohio, U.S.

Coordinates: 40°56′32″N 80°50′09″W

New Albany is an unincorporated community in Mahoning County, in the U.S. state of Ohio.

== History ==
A post office called New Albany was established in 1842, and remained in operation until 1881. Besides the post office, New Albany had a steam mill, the first in Mahoning County.
