= Knaufville, Ohio =

Unincorporated community in Ohio, U.S.

Coordinates: 40°59′40″N 80°48′59″W

Knaufville is an unincorporated community in Mahoning County, in the U.S. state of Ohio.

== History ==
A post office called Knaufville was established in 1897, and remained in operation until 1901. The Knauf family were local landowners in Ellsworth Township.
