= Hickory Corners, Ohio =

Unincorporated community in Ohio, U.S.

Coordinates: 40°58′23″N 80°51′21″W

Hickory Corners is an unincorporated community in Mahoning County, in the U.S. state of Ohio.

== History ==
Variant names were Hickory and Hickoryville. A school was in operation at Hickory as early as 1825. A post office called Hickory was established in 1891, and remained in operation until 1901.
