= Poland Center, Ohio =

Unincorporated community in Ohio, U.S.

Coordinates: 41°1′26″N 80°34′3″W

Poland Center is an unincorporated community in Mahoning County, in the U.S. state of Ohio.

== History ==
A schoolhouse was built at Poland Center as early as 1833. A post office called Poland Centre was established in 1852, and remained in operation until 1858.
