= Coitsville Center, Ohio =

Unincorporated community in Ohio, U.S.

Coordinates: 41°5′25″N 80°34′4″W

Coitsville Center is an unincorporated community in Mahoning County, in the U.S. state of Ohio.

== History ==
A variant name was Coitsville. A post office called Coitsville was established in 1826, and remained in operation until 1900. The community was named for its location near the geographical center of Coitsville Township.
