= East Alliance, Ohio =

- Census-designated place
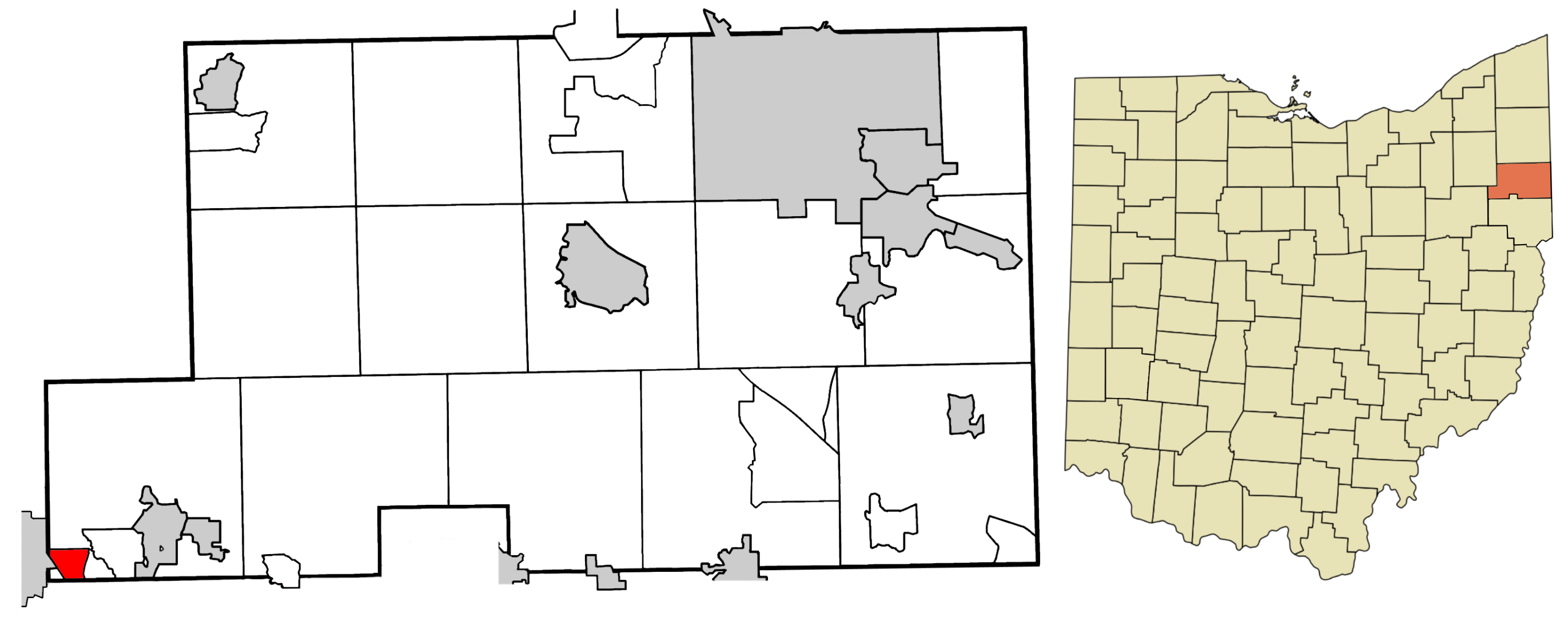
- Location in Mahoning County, Ohio

- Location within Ohio Location within the United States
- Coordinates: 40°54′48″N 81°4′42″W
- Country: United States
- State: Ohio
- County: Mahoning
- Township: Smith

Area
  - Total: 0.83 sq mi (2.14 km^{2})
  - Land: 0.79 sq mi (2.05 km^{2})
  - Water: 0.035 sq mi (0.09 km^{2})
- Elevation: 1,059 ft (323 m)

Population (2020)
  - Total: 268
  - Density: 337.9/sq mi (130.48/km^{2})
- Time zone: UTC-5 (Eastern (EST))
  - Summer (DST): UTC-4 (EDT)
- ZIP Code: 44601 (Alliance)
- Area codes: 234/330
- FIPS code: 38-23254
- GNIS feature ID: 2812832

East Alliance is an unincorporated community and census-designated place (CDP) in Mahoning County, Ohio, United States. It was first listed as a CDP for the 2020 census, when it had a population of 268.

The CDP is in the southwest corner of Mahoning County and the southwest corner of Smith Township. It is bordered to the west by the city of Alliance in Stark County and to the south by Knox Township in Columbiana County. U.S. Route 62, following the Columbiana County line, runs along the south edge of East Alliance; it leads west into Alliance and east 11 miles (18 km) to Salem.

== Demographics ==
Historical population
Census	Pop.	Note	%±
2020	268		—
U.S. Decennial Census
