= Canfield Township, Ohio =

Township in Ohio, US

- Township
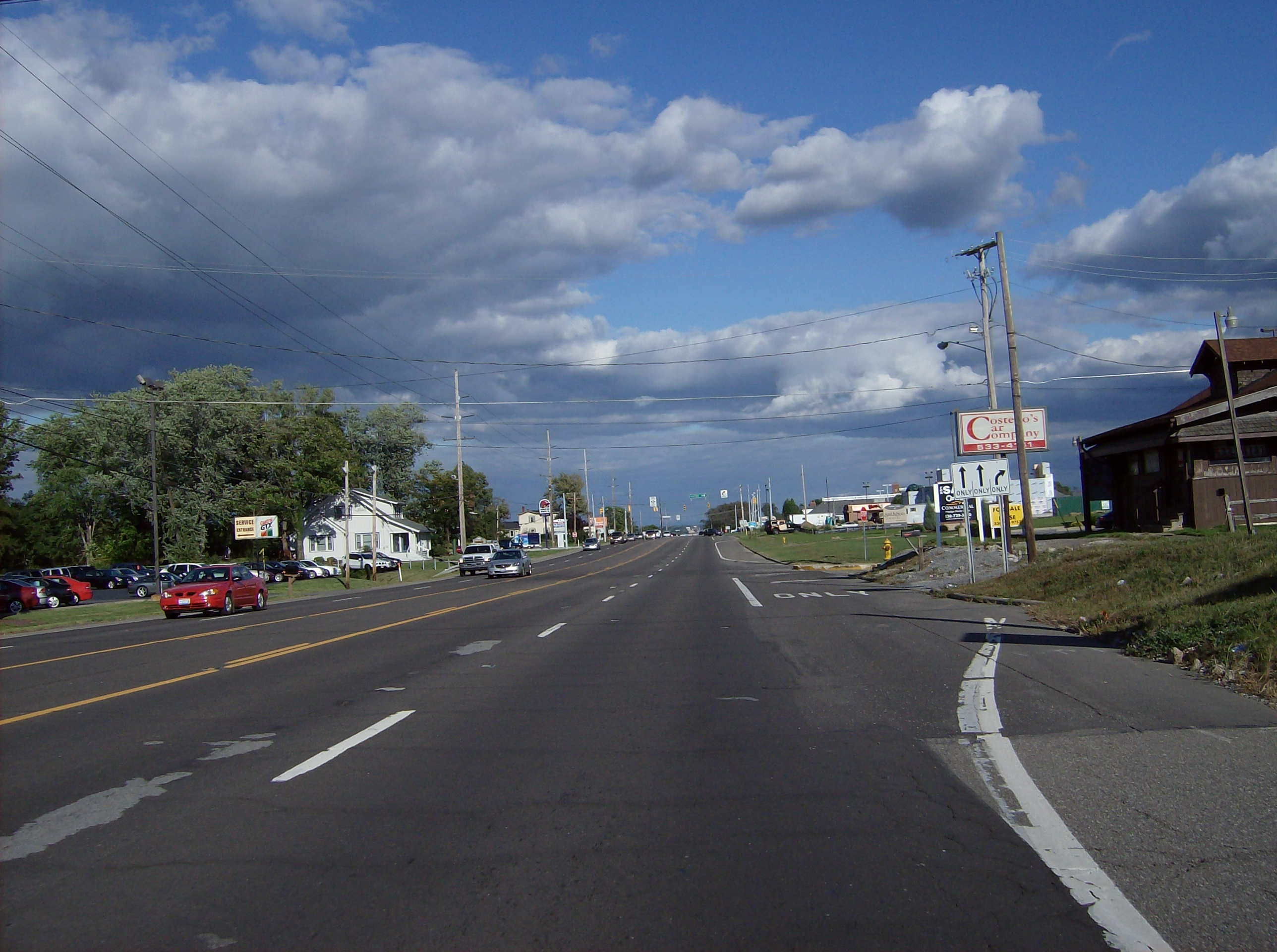
- Suburban development on U.S. Route 224

- Flag Seal

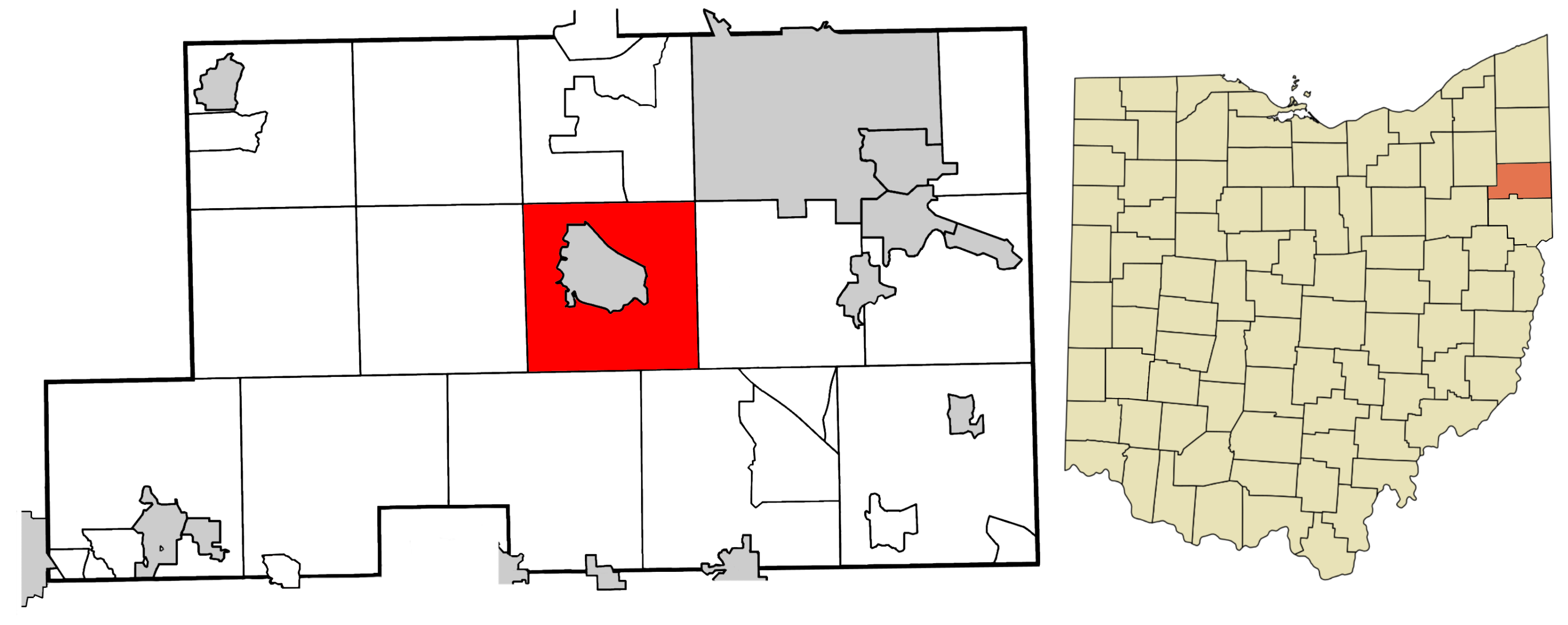
- Location of Canfield Township in Mahoning County
- Coordinates: 41°2′0″N 80°45′14″W
- Country: United States
- State: Ohio
- County: Mahoning

Area
  - Total: 26.0 sq mi (67.3 km^{2})
  - Land: 25.8 sq mi (66.7 km^{2})
  - Water: 0.23 sq mi (0.6 km^{2})
- Elevation: 1,171 ft (357 m)

Population (2020)
  - Total: 16,944
  - Density: 658/sq mi (254/km^{2})
- Time zone: UTC-5 (Eastern (EST))
  - Summer (DST): UTC-4 (EDT)
- ZIP code: 44406
- Area codes: 234/330
- FIPS code: 39-11374
- GNIS feature ID: 1086560
- Website: https://canfieldtownship.org/

Canfield Township is one of the fourteen townships of Mahoning County, Ohio, United States. The 2020 census found 16,944 people in the township.

== Geography ==
Located in the center of the county, it borders the following townships:

- Austintown Township - north
- Youngstown - northeast corner
- Boardman Township - east
- Beaver Township - southeast
- Green Township - southwest
- Ellsworth Township - west
- Jackson Township - northwest corner

The city of Canfield is located in the central part of Canfield Township.

== Name and history ==
Canfield Township is named for Judson Canfield, a pioneer settler and prominent land owner.

It is the only Canfield Township statewide.

== Government ==
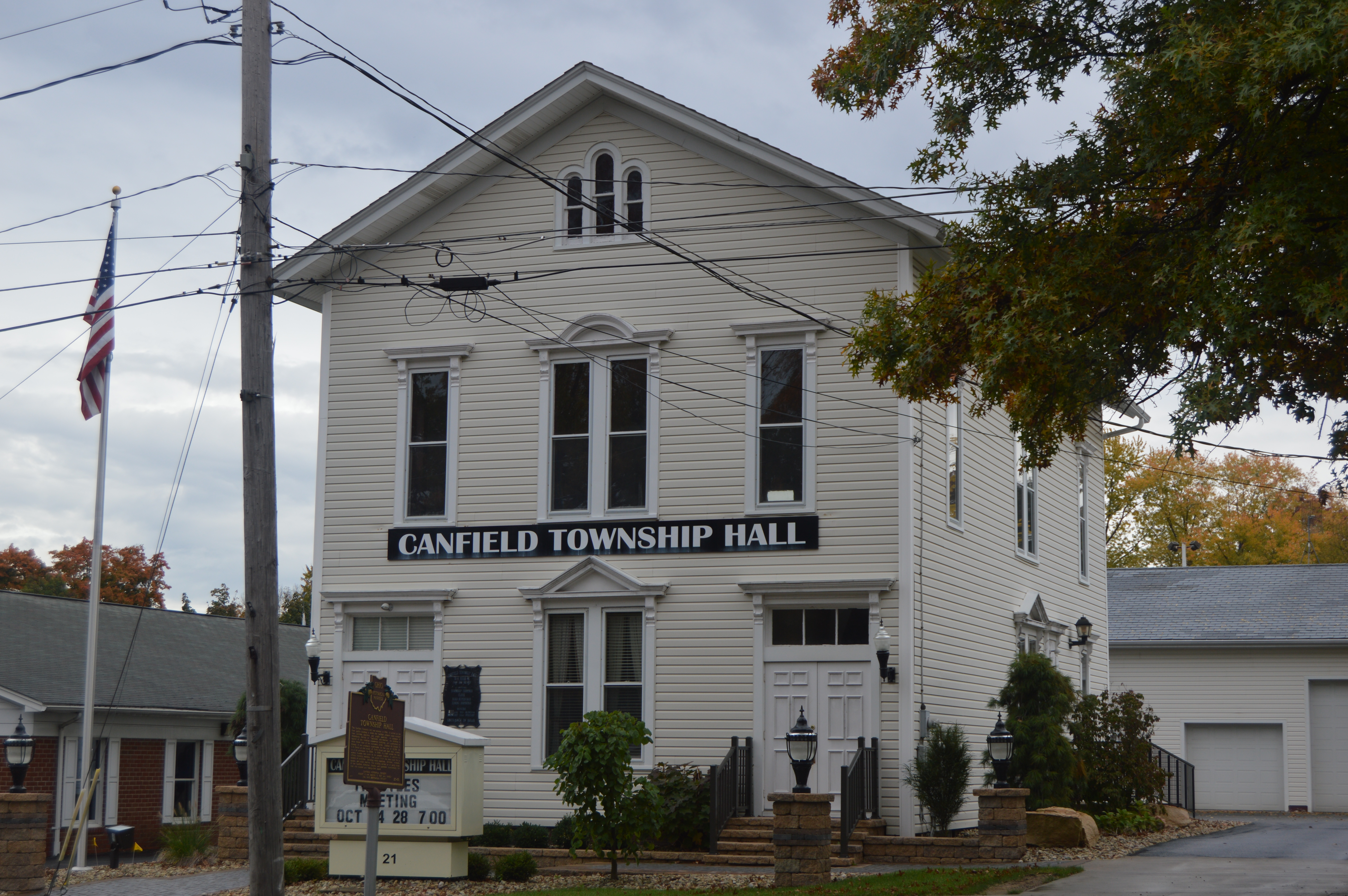
Canfield Township hall

The township is governed by a three-member board of trustees, who are elected in November of odd-numbered years to a four-year term beginning on the following January 1. Two are elected in the year after the presidential election and one is elected in the year before it. There is also an elected township fiscal officer, who serves a four-year term beginning on April 1 of the year after the election, which is held in November of the year before the presidential election. Vacancies in the fiscal officership or on the board of trustees are filled by the remaining trustees.
