= East Lewistown, Ohio =

Unincorporated community in Ohio, U.S.

Coordinates: 40°56′39″N 80°41′54″W

East Lewistown is an unincorporated community in Mahoning County, in the U.S. state of Ohio.

== History ==
East Lewistown was laid out in 1830. A post office called East Lewistown was established in 1850, and remained in operation until 1902.
