= Canfield High School =

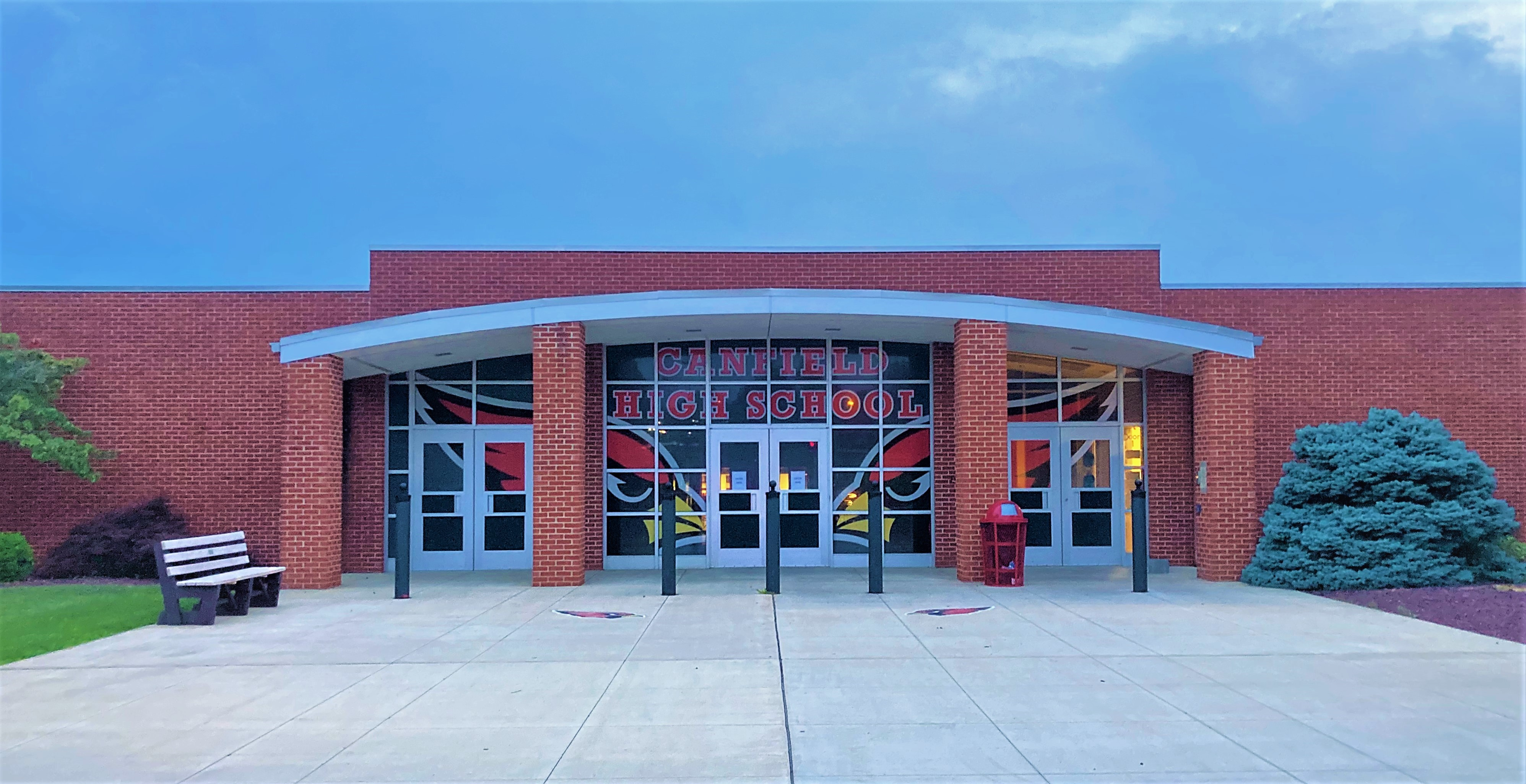

Location
- 100 Cardinal Drive; Canfield, Ohio 44406; United States; 41.0287°N 80.7723°W

Information
- Type: Public
- Established: 1869
- School district: Canfield Local Schools
- Principal: Salvatore Maiorana
- Faculty: 49.09 (on an FTE basis)
- Grades: 9–12
- Enrollment: 733 (2024–2025)
- Student to teacher ratio: 14.93
- Colors: Red and black
- Athletics conference: All-American Conference
- Team name: Cardinals
- Website: chs.canfieldschools.net

Canfield High School is a public high school located in Canfield, Ohio, United States. It is the only high school in the Canfield Local School District. The athletic teams are known as the Cardinals and compete as a member of the Ohio High School Athletic Association in the All-American Conference.

== History ==
In 1867, electors in Canfield met to decide on adding a union school. Citizens approved the construction of the school and Canfields first Union School was built in 1869, with the first classes in 1870. The school cost $33,000 to construct. It was later demolished in 1953. Population continued to grow in the late 19th century and early 20th century, leading voters to approve a levy in 1916 to build a new school with modern amenities. The construction of the high school was delayed until 1922 by federal restrictions during World War I.

The current high school campus was built in 1966 at the cost of $1,425,000. The construction of the campus was made possible by a bond issue, which was approved in November 1964, with ground being broken on May 15, 1965. The 1922 campus was later used as a junior high school and elementary school.

== Athletics ==
=== State championships ===
- Baseball – 2007
- Football – 2022
- Softball – 2008, 2024
- Boys' bowling – 2013

=== Facilities ===
Cardinal Stadium

Cardinal Stadium, located adjacent to the high school was opened in 1983 and features an all-season track with an artificial turf field and a video scoreboard. It is able to seat up to 4,050 people and is used by the high school's track and field, football, and soccer teams.

== Notable alumni ==
- Broc Lowry, college football quarterback
- Georgio Poullas, wrestler, social media influencer
