= West Branch High School (Ohio) =

Coordinates: 40°54′42″N 80°59′34″W

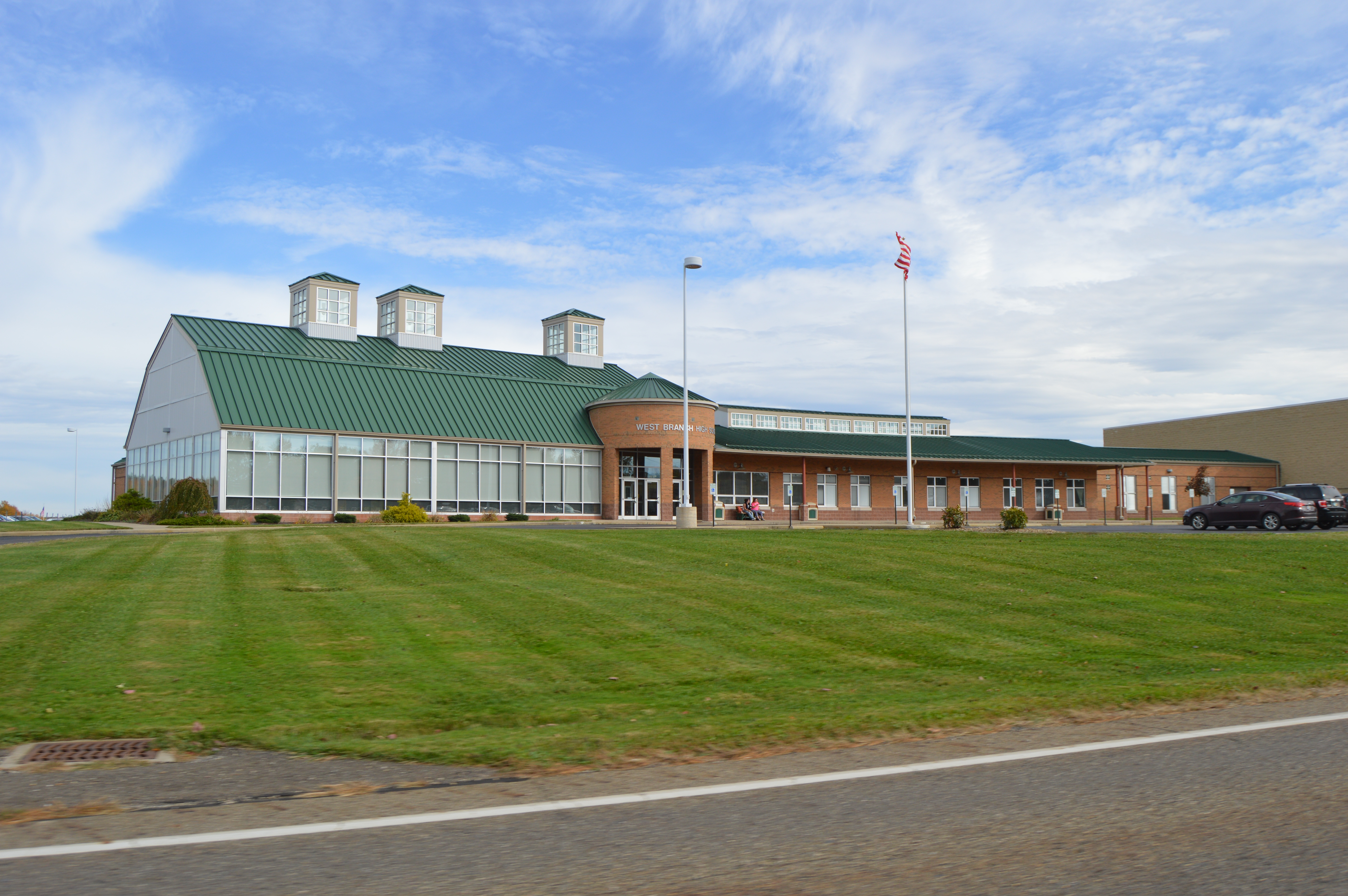

Location
- 14277 South Main Street; Beloit, Ohio 44609; United States

Information
- Type: Public, Coeducational high school
- School district: West Branch Local School District
- Superintendent: Matthew Manley
- Principal: Brian Coffee
- Teaching staff: 39.90 (FTE)
- Grades: 9-12
- Student to teacher ratio: 14.96
- Colors: Green and White
- Athletics conference: Eastern Buckeye Conference
- Team name: Warriors
- Athletic Director: Ryan Wolf
- Website: hs.westbranch.k12.oh.us

West Branch High School is a public high school in Beloit, Ohio. It is the only high school in the West Branch Local School District. Their nickname is the Warriors, and they compete in the Ohio High School Athletic Association as a member of the Eastern Buckeye Conference.

== History ==
Opened in 1960, West Branch High School serves students grades 9-12.

The original West Branch High School was located at the current West Branch Early Learning Center on South Pricetown Rd in Salem, Ohio. It was later relocated to its current building in 1963.

In June 2001, West Branch faced an outbreak of bacterial meningitis that killed two high school students. A third student was hospitalized but survived the illness.

== Athletics ==
West Branch's athletic teams has had several individual state champions in wrestling and track and field respectively, as well as multiple State Final Four appearances across several sports.

=== OHSAA State Championships ===
- Football – 1994
- Girls Basketball – 2004
- Baseball - 2024

== Notable alumni ==
- Dru DeShields - college football quarterback for the Kent State Golden Flashes
