= Smith Township, Mahoning County, Ohio =

Township in Ohio, US

- Township
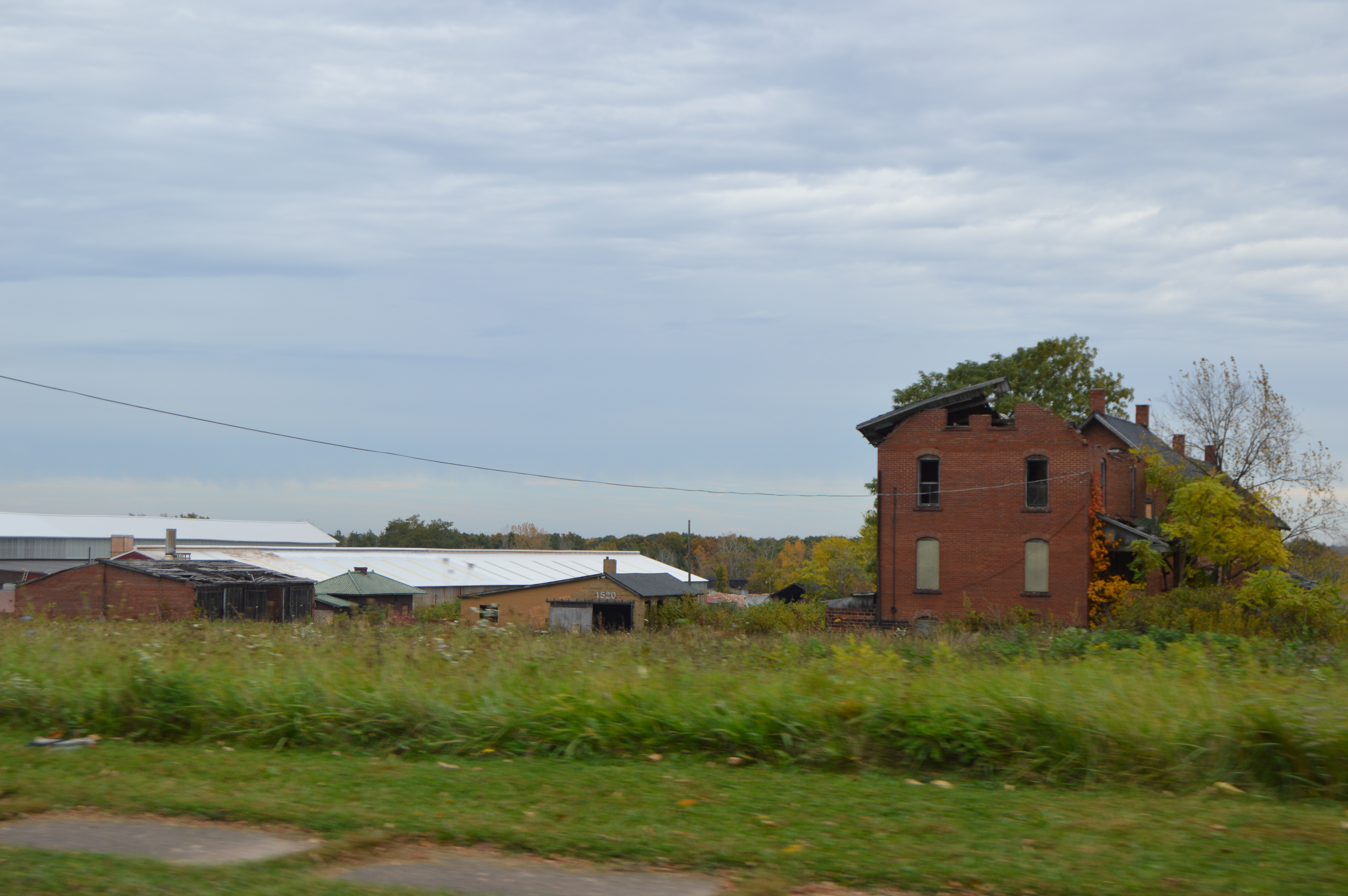
- Abandoned buildings at the Alliance Clay Product Company complex

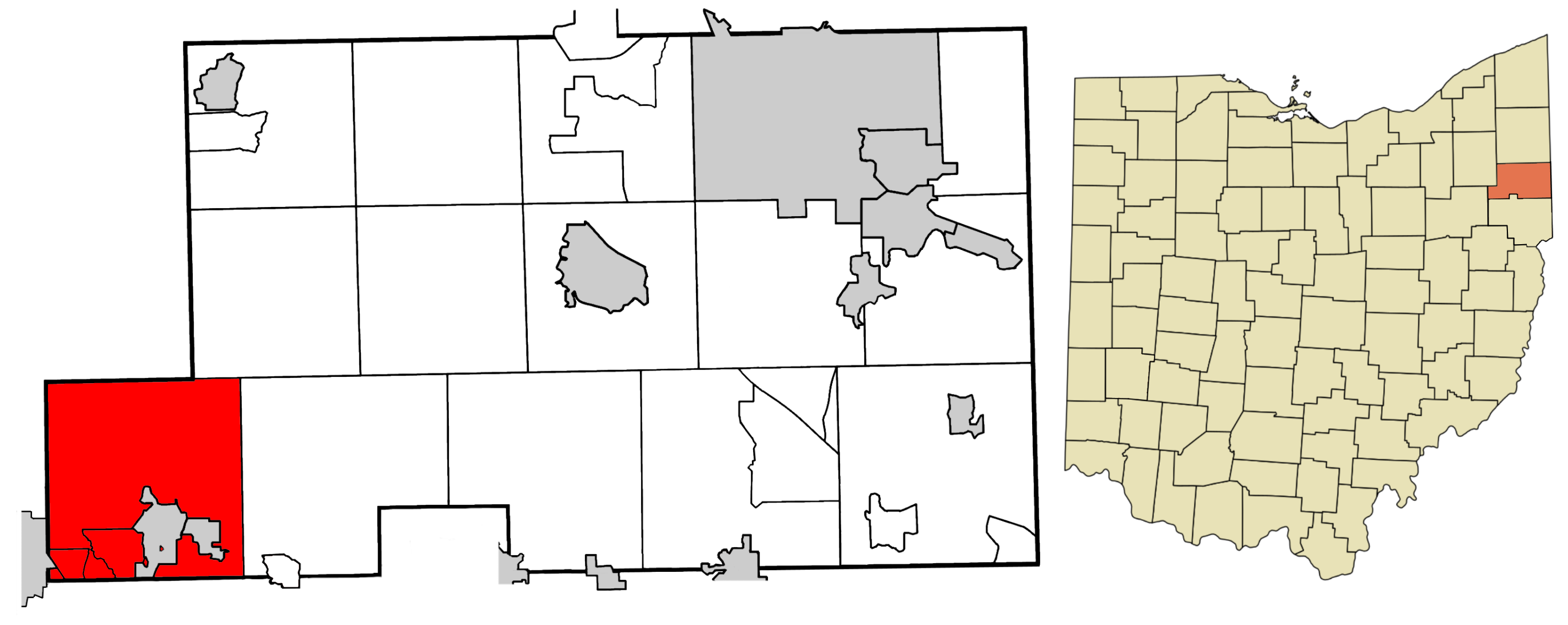
- Location of Smith Township in Mahoning County
- Coordinates: 40°55′53″N 81°2′36″W
- Country: United States
- State: Ohio
- County: Mahoning

Area
  - Total: 32.5 sq mi (84.1 km^{2})
  - Land: 31.8 sq mi (82.3 km^{2})
  - Water: 0.66 sq mi (1.7 km^{2})
- Elevation: 1,079 ft (329 m)

Population (2020)
  - Total: 4,097
  - Density: 129/sq mi (49.8/km^{2})
- Time zone: UTC-5 (Eastern (EST))
  - Summer (DST): UTC-4 (EDT)
- FIPS code: 39-72740
- GNIS feature ID: 1086570
- Website: https://smithtownship.net/

Smith Township is one of the fourteen townships of Mahoning County, Ohio, United States. The 2020 census found 4,097 people in the township.

== Geography ==
Located in the southwestern corner of the county, it borders the following townships:

- Deerfield Township, Portage County - north
- Berlin Township - northeast
- Goshen Township - east
- Butler Township, Columbiana County - southeast corner
- Knox Township, Columbiana County - south
- Lexington Township, Stark County - west

The farthest west township in Mahoning County, it is the only township to border Stark County.

Several populated places are located in Smith Township:

- The city of Alliance, in the southwest corner
- The village of Beloit, in the southeast
- The village of Sebring, in the south
- The census-designated places of East Alliance and Maple Ridge, in the southwest
- The unincorporated community of North Benton, in the north

== Name and history ==
Statewide, the only other Smith Township is located in Belmont County.

Smith Township was organized in March 1821 upon the petition of Judge William Smith, in whose honor it was named. Judge William Smith was a pioneer in Mahoning County.

For many years, the township was part of Columbiana County, before becoming part of Mahoning County in 1846.

== Government ==
The township is governed by a three-member board of trustees, who are elected in November of odd-numbered years to a four-year term beginning on the following January 1. Two are elected in the year after the presidential election and one is elected in the year before it. There is also an elected township fiscal officer, who serves a four-year term beginning on April 1 of the year after the election, which is held in November of the year before the presidential election. Vacancies in the fiscal officership or on the board of trustees are filled by the remaining trustees.
