= Beaver Township, Mahoning County, Ohio =

Township in Ohio, US

- Township
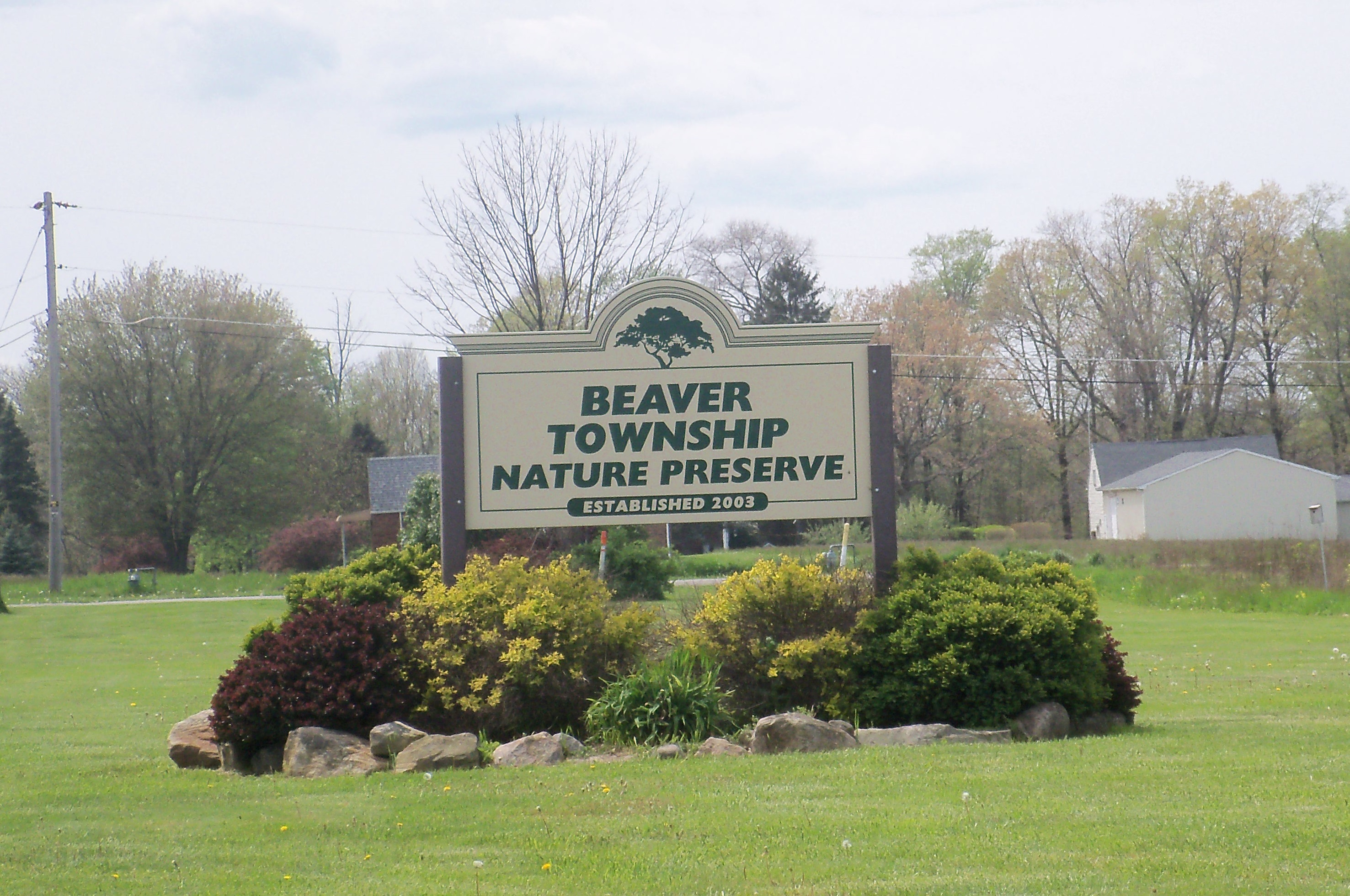
- Nature preserve in East Lewistown

- Flag

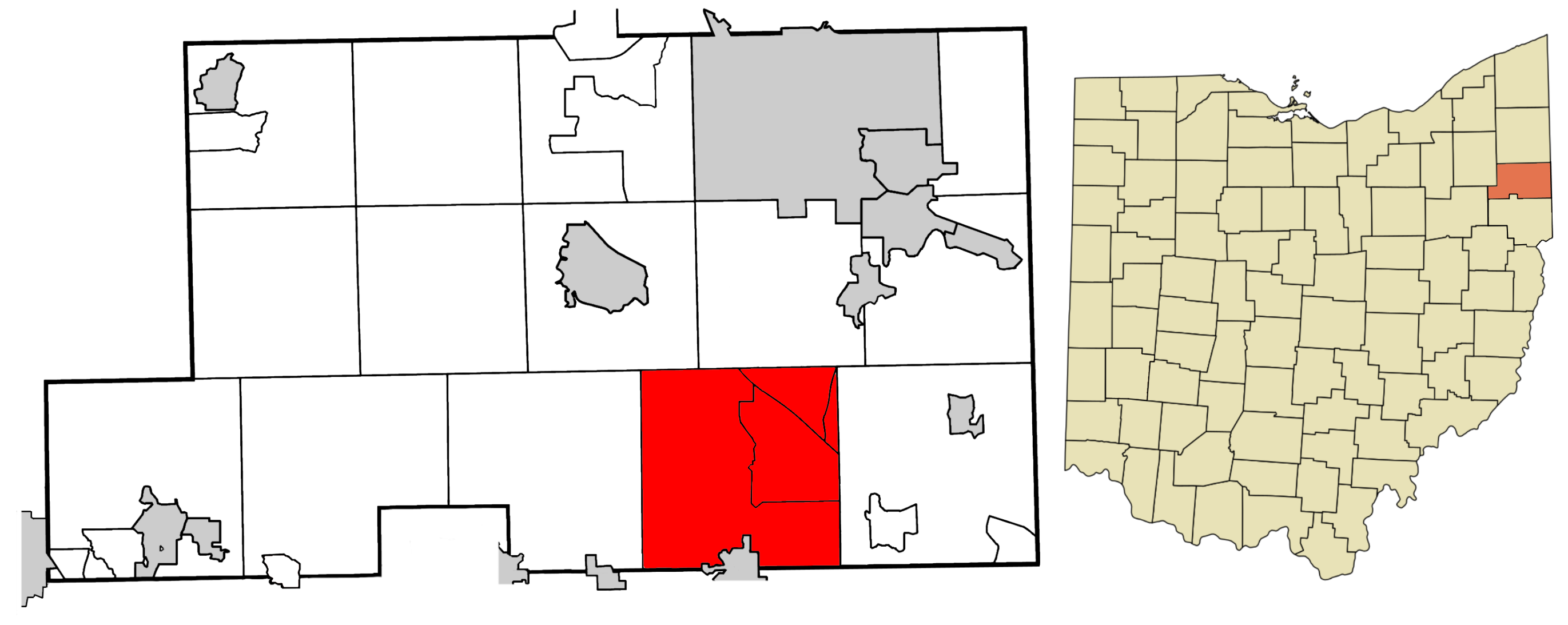
- Location of Beaver Township in Mahoning County
- Coordinates: 40°56′27″N 80°40′26″W
- Country: United States
- State: Ohio
- County: Mahoning

Area
  - Total: 35.3 sq mi (91.5 km^{2})
  - Land: 33.7 sq mi (87.3 km^{2})
  - Water: 1.6 sq mi (4.2 km^{2})
- Elevation: 1,020 ft (310 m)

Population (2020)
  - Total: 6,756
  - Density: 200/sq mi (77.4/km^{2})
- Time zone: UTC-5 (Eastern (EST))
  - Summer (DST): UTC-4 (EDT)
- FIPS code: 39-04668
- GNIS feature ID: 1086556
- Website: www.beavertwp-oh.gov

Beaver Township is one of the fourteen townships of Mahoning County, Ohio, United States. The 2020 census found 6,756 people in the township.

== Geography ==
Located in the southern part of the county, Beaver Township borders the following other townships:

- Boardman Township - northeast
- Springfield Township - east
- Unity Township, Columbiana County - southeast corner
- Fairfield Township, Columbiana County - south
- Salem Township, Columbiana County - southwest corner
- Green Township - west
- Canfield Township - northwest

Part of the city of Columbiana is located in southern Beaver Township. census-designated place of North Lima lies at the center of the township. The township also contains the CDP of Woodworth.

== Name and history ==
Beaver Township was organized in 1811. For many years, the township was part of Columbiana County, before becoming part of Mahoning County in 1846.

Statewide, other Beaver Townships are located in Noble and Pike counties.

== Government ==
The township is governed by a three-member board of trustees, who are elected in November of odd-numbered years to a four-year term beginning on the following January 1. Two are elected in the year after the presidential election and one is elected in the year before it. There is also an elected township fiscal officer, who serves a four-year term beginning on April 1 of the year after the election, which is held in November of the year before the presidential election. Vacancies in the fiscal officership or on the board of trustees are filled by the remaining trustees. The trustees are Ronald Kappler (chair), Eric Tabor, and Pam Simmons, and Richard Lotze is the fiscal officer. The township operates police and fire departments.

== Transportation ==
The Youngstown Elser Metro Airport is located within Beaver Township.

== Education ==
Most school age children residing in Beaver Township attend South Range Local School District. Its high school, middle school and elementary school are all located in a new (Fall 2010) complex in Beaver Township.
