= Woodworth, Ohio =

- Census-designated place
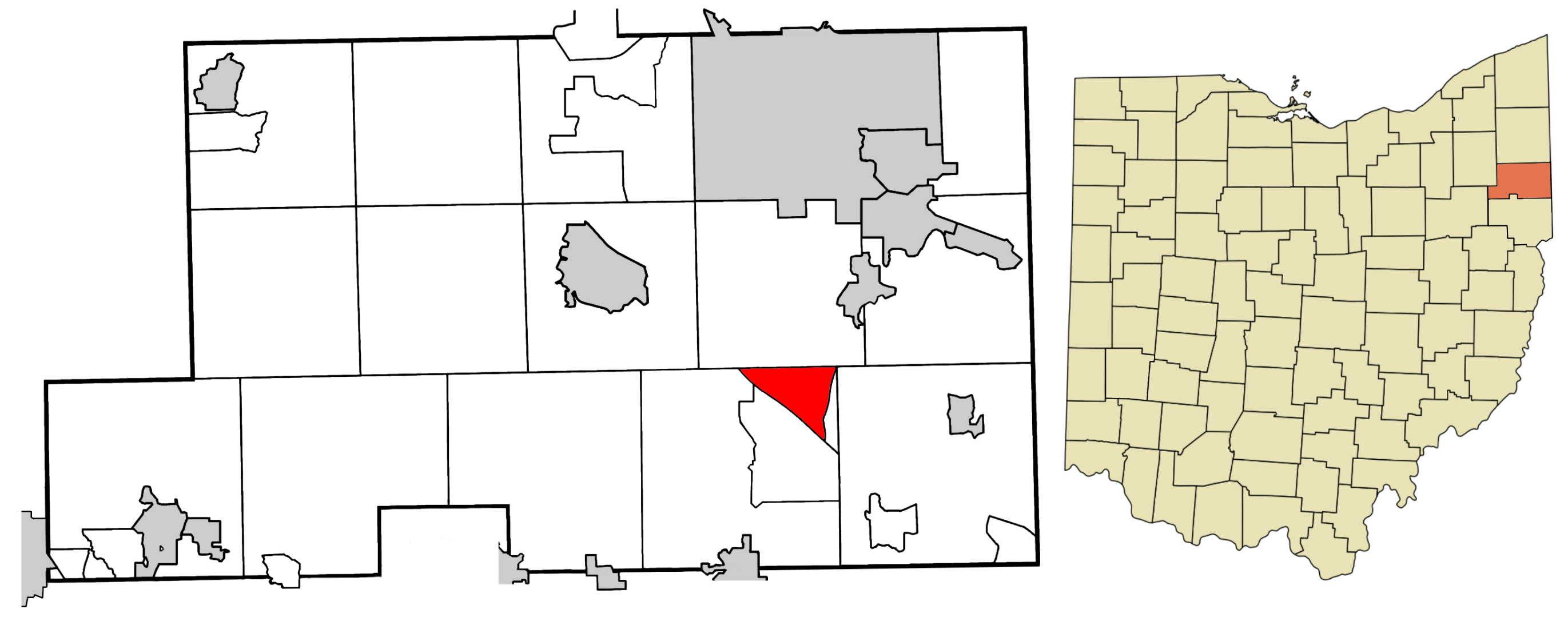
- Location in Mahoning County, Ohio

- Location within Ohio Location within the United States
- Coordinates: 40°58′40″N 80°39′17″W
- Country: United States
- State: Ohio
- County: Mahoning
- Township: Beaver

Area
  - Total: 3.14 sq mi (8.14 km^{2})
  - Land: 3.08 sq mi (7.99 km^{2})
  - Water: 0.054 sq mi (0.14 km^{2})
- Elevation: 1,125 ft (343 m)

Population (2020)
  - Total: 1,784
  - Density: 578.0/sq mi (223.15/km^{2})
- Time zone: UTC-5 (Eastern (EST))
  - Summer (DST): UTC-4 (EDT)
- ZIP Codes: 44452 (North Lima); 44514 (Poland)
- Area codes: 330, 234
- FIPS code: 39-86534
- GNIS feature ID: 2812829

Woodworth is an unincorporated community and census-designated place in Beaver Township, Mahoning County, Ohio, United States. The population was 1,784 at the 2020 census. It lies along State Routes 7 and 626, bordering the communities of Boardman to the north and North Lima to the south. It is part of the Youngstown–Warren metropolitan area.

== History ==
Woodworth was originally called Steamtown. A post office called Steamtown was in operation from 1857 until 1860 and a post office called Woodworth from 1874 until 1905.

== Demographics ==
Historical population
| Census | Pop. | Note | %± |
|---|---|---|---|
| 2020 | 1,784 | | — |
U.S. Decennial Census
