= Beloit, Ohio =

- Village
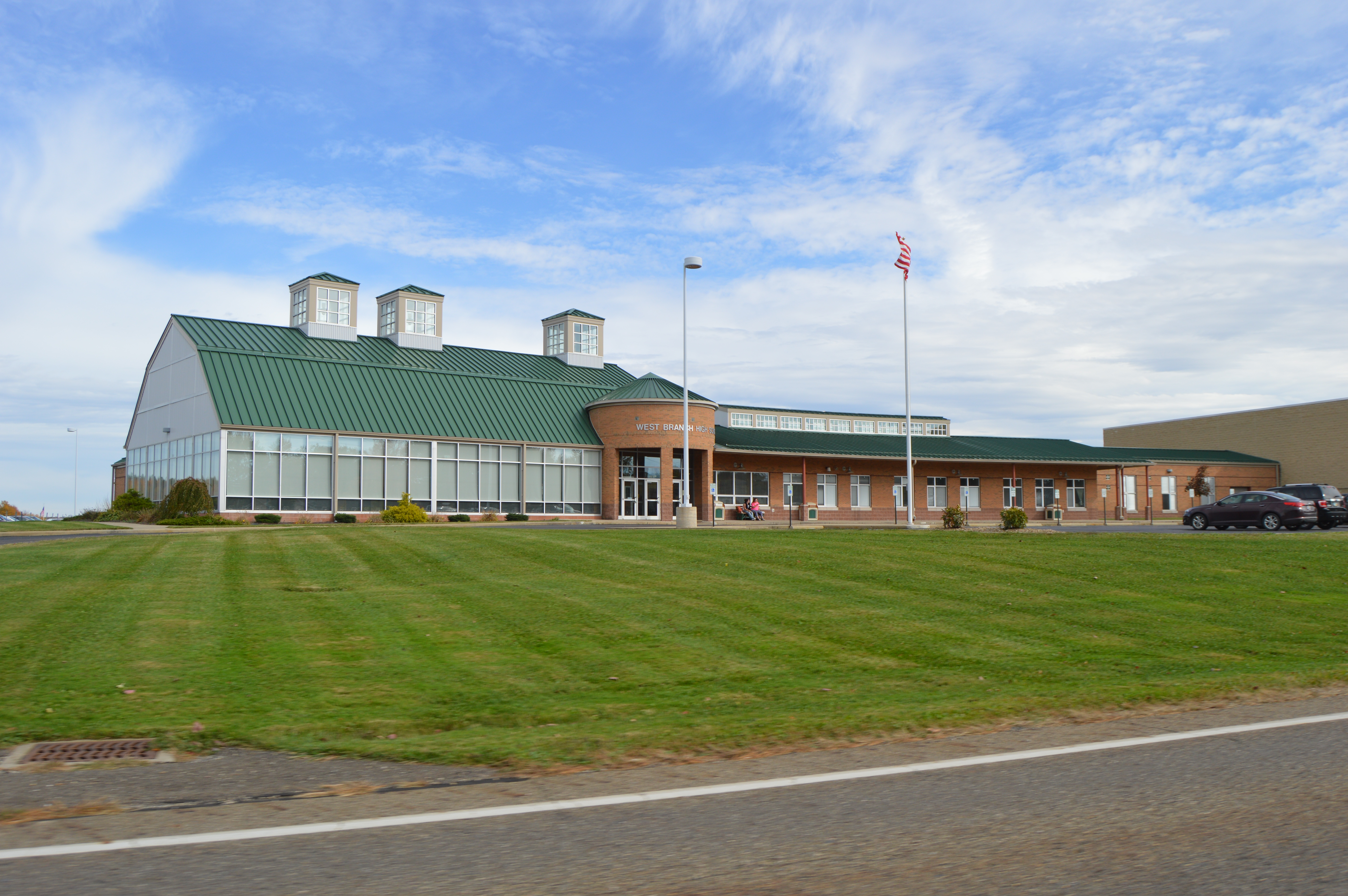
- West Branch High School in southern Beloit
- Interactive map of Beloit, Ohio
- Location within Ohio Location within the United States
- Coordinates: 40°55′16″N 81°00′05″W
- Country: United States
- State: Ohio
- County: Mahoning
- Township: Smith

Area
  - Total: 0.98 sq mi (2.55 km^{2})
  - Land: 0.98 sq mi (2.53 km^{2})
  - Water: 0.0077 sq mi (0.02 km^{2})
- Elevation: 1,132 ft (345 m)

Population (2020)
  - Total: 903
  - Estimate (2023): 892
  - Density: 926.0/sq mi (357.54/km^{2})
- Time zone: UTC-5 (Eastern (EST))
  - Summer (DST): UTC-4 (EDT)
- ZIP code: 44609
- Area codes: 234/330
- FIPS code: 39-05410
- GNIS feature ID: 2398089
- Website: https://villageofbeloitohio.com/

Beloit (/bəˈlɔɪt/ bə-LOYT) is a village in southwestern Mahoning County, Ohio, United States. The population was 903 at the 2020 census. It is part of the Youngstown–Warren metropolitan area.

== History ==
Beloit had its start in the late 1840s by the building of the railroad through that territory. It was originally called Smithfield Station, and the name Beloit was adopted in 1863. The name Beloit is a transfer from Beloit, Wisconsin.

== Geography ==
According to the United States Census Bureau, the village has a total area of 0.99 square miles (2.56 km^{2}), of which 0.98 square miles (2.54 km^{2}) is land and 0.01 square miles (0.03 km^{2}) is water.

== Demographics ==
Historical population
Census	Pop.	Note	%±
1880	162		—
1910	510		—
1920	589		15.5%
1930	694		17.8%
1940	706		1.7%
1950	778		10.2%
1960	877		12.7%
1970	921		5.0%
1980	1,093		18.7%
1990	1,037		−5.1%
2000	1,024		−1.3%
2010	978		−4.5%
2020	903		−7.7%
2023 (est.)	892	▼	−1.2%
U.S. Decennial Census

=== 2020 census ===
As of the 2020 census, there were 903 people and 456 households living in Beloit. The racial makeup was 94.5% White, 1% Hispanic or Latino and >1% each African American, Native American, or some other race, with 7% of the population identifying as two or more races. 0.4% of the population speak a language other than English at home.

Of the families in Beloit, 23.1% were under 18 years of age, the average family size was 2.92 people, and 29.1% were never married. 18% are disabled and 4.2% are living without health insurance.

The median household income was $40,833, 8.8% were living in poverty, and of those living in poverty, 26.6% were male and 73.3% were female. 12.8% have a bachelor's degree of higher, 73.6% are enrolled in K-12 education. 6% are under 5, 17.9% are 6-19, 59.2% are 20-64, and 16.8% are 65 or older. The median age is 40.8. 40.6% are male and 59.3% are female.

=== 2010 census ===
As of the census of 2010, there were 978 people, 425 households, and 275 families living in the village. The population density was 998.0 inhabitants per square mile (385.3/km^{2}). There were 468 housing units at an average density of 477.6 per square mile (184.4/km^{2}). The racial makeup of the village was 97.3% White, 0.3% African American, 0.1% Native American, 0.4% Asian, and 1.8% from two or more races. Hispanic or Latino people of any race were 0.3% of the population.

There were 425 households, of which 31.5% had children under the age of 18 living with them, 44.7% were married couples living together, 14.6% had a female householder with no husband present, 5.4% had a male householder with no wife present, and 35.3% were non-families. 31.5% of all households were made up of individuals, and 16.4% had someone living alone who was 65 years of age or older. The average household size was 2.30 and the average family size was 2.86.

The median age in the village was 43.4 years. 23.8% of residents were under the age of 18; 5.9% were between the ages of 18 and 24; 21.9% were from 25 to 44; 26.3% were from 45 to 64; and 22.1% were 65 years of age or older. The gender makeup of the village was 47.6% male and 52.4% female.

=== 2000 census ===
As of the census of 2000, there were 1,024 people, 426 households, and 287 families living in the village. The population density was 1,332.9 inhabitants per square mile (514.6/km^{2}). There were 452 housing units at an average density of 588.4 per square mile (227.2/km^{2}). The racial makeup of the village was 98.54% White, 0.29% African American, 0.10% Asian, 0.10% from other races, and 0.98% from two or more races. Hispanic or Latino people of any race were 0.10% of the population.

There were 426 households, out of which 28.9% had children under the age of 18 living with them, 49.1% were married couples living together, 14.8% had a female householder with no husband present, and 32.6% were non-families. 28.2% of all households were made up of individuals, and 12.4% had someone living alone who was 65 years of age or older. The average household size was 2.40 and the average family size was 2.94.

In the village, the population was spread out, with 23.3% under the age of 18, 8.0% from 18 to 24, 26.4% from 25 to 44, 22.0% from 45 to 64, and 20.3% who were 65 years of age or older. The median age was 40 years. For every 100 females there were 83.8 males. For every 100 females age 18 and over, there were 80.5 males.

The median income for a household in the village was $32,279, and the median income for a family was $40,096. Males had a median income of $31,042 versus $19,615 for females. The per capita income for the village was $16,359. About 8.7% of families and 10.6% of the population were below the poverty line, including 17.4% of those under age 18 and 8.3% of those age 65 or over.

== Education ==
Children in Beloit are served by the public West Branch Local School District, which includes one early learning school, one intermediate school, one middle school, and West Branch High School.
