= Green Township, Mahoning County, Ohio =

Township in Ohio, US

- Township
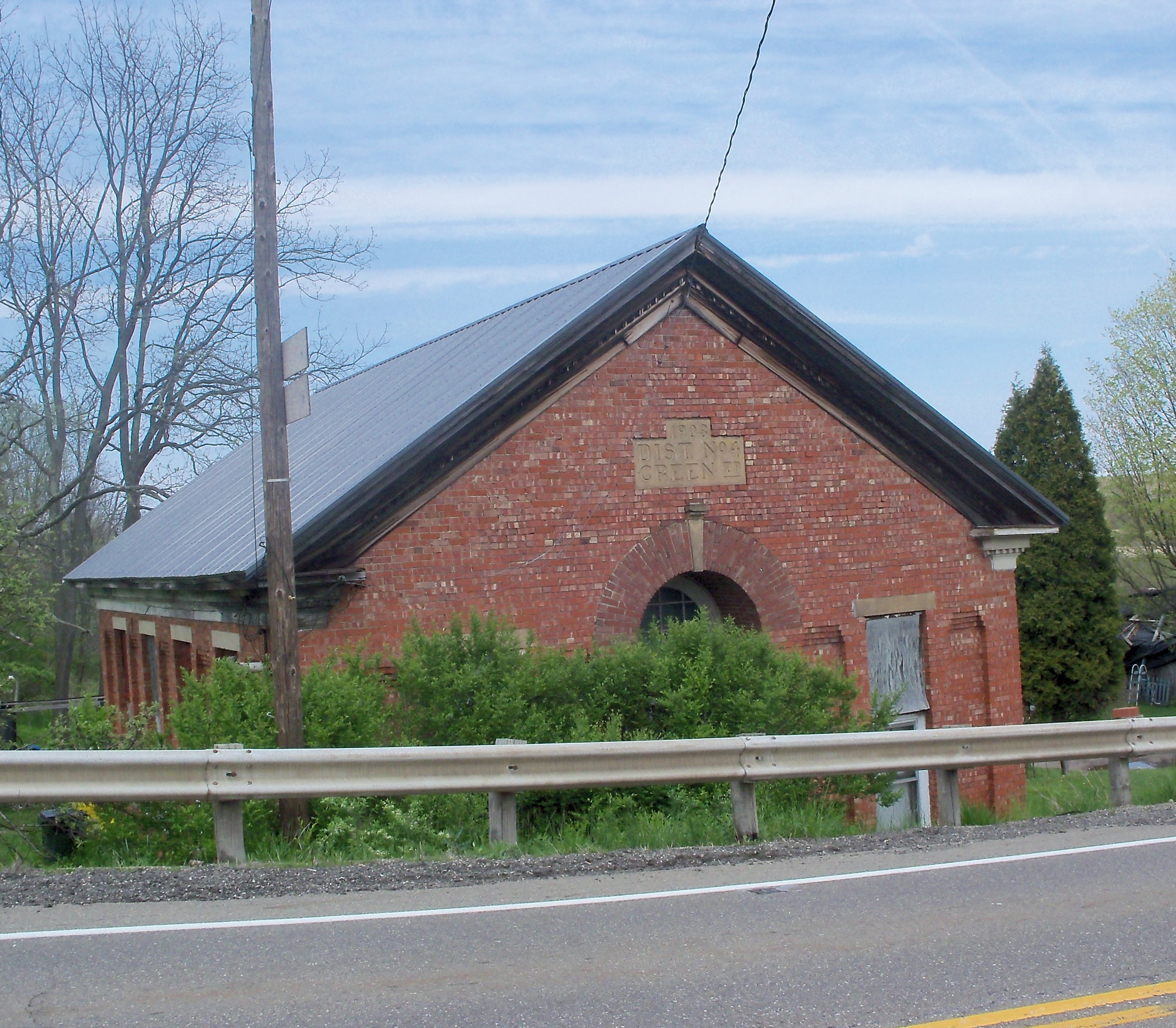
- Old Number 4 School, Route 165

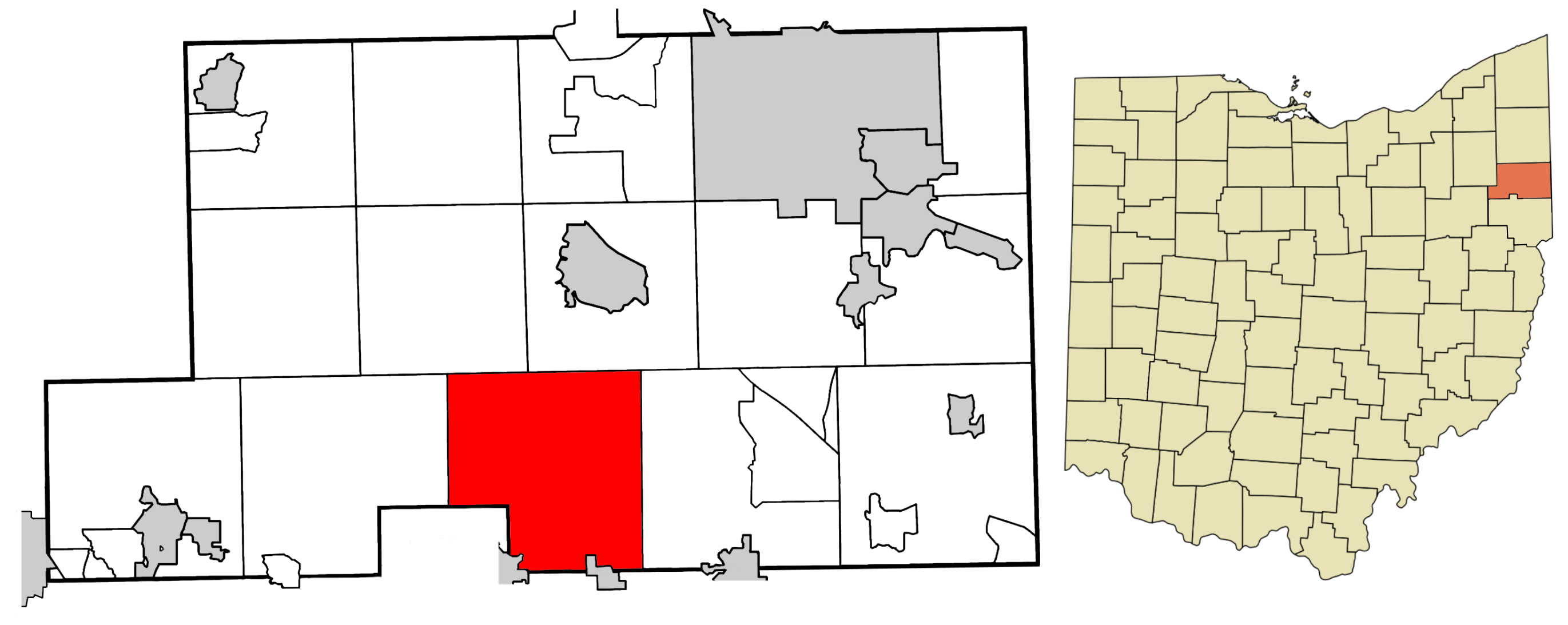
- Location of Green Township in Mahoning County
- Coordinates: 40°55′54″N 80°47′58″W
- Country: United States
- State: Ohio
- County: Mahoning

Area
  - Total: 31.2 sq mi (80.9 km^{2})
  - Land: 30.8 sq mi (79.8 km^{2})
  - Water: 0.42 sq mi (1.1 km^{2})
- Elevation: 1,220 ft (372 m)

Population (2020)
  - Total: 3,414
  - Density: 111/sq mi (42.8/km^{2})
- Time zone: UTC-5 (Eastern (EST))
  - Summer (DST): UTC-4 (EDT)
- FIPS code: 39-31794
- GNIS feature ID: 1086564
- Website: www.greentownship.us

Green Township is one of the fourteen townships of Mahoning County, Ohio, United States. The 2020 census found 3,414 people in the township.

== Geography ==
Located in the southern part of the county, it borders the following townships:

- Canfield Township - northeast
- Beaver Township - east
- Fairfield Township, Columbiana County - southeast corner
- Salem Township, Columbiana County - south
- Perry Township, Columbiana County - southwest
- Goshen Township - west
- Ellsworth Township - northwest

Part of the village of Washingtonville is located in southeastern Green Township, and the unincorporated community of Greenford lies at the center of the township.

== Name and history ==
Green Township was established in 1806. For many years, it was one of the northern row of townships in Columbiana County, before becoming part of Mahoning County in 1846.

It is one of sixteen Green Townships statewide.

== Government ==
The township is governed by a three-member board of trustees, who are elected in November of odd-numbered years to a four-year term beginning on the following January 1. Two are elected in the year after the presidential election and one is elected in the year before it. There is also an elected township fiscal officer, who serves a four-year term beginning on April 1 of the year after the election, which is held in November of the year before the presidential election. Vacancies in the fiscal officership or on the board of trustees are filled by the remaining trustees.
