= South Range High School =

Coordinates: 40°57′17″N 80°44′36″W

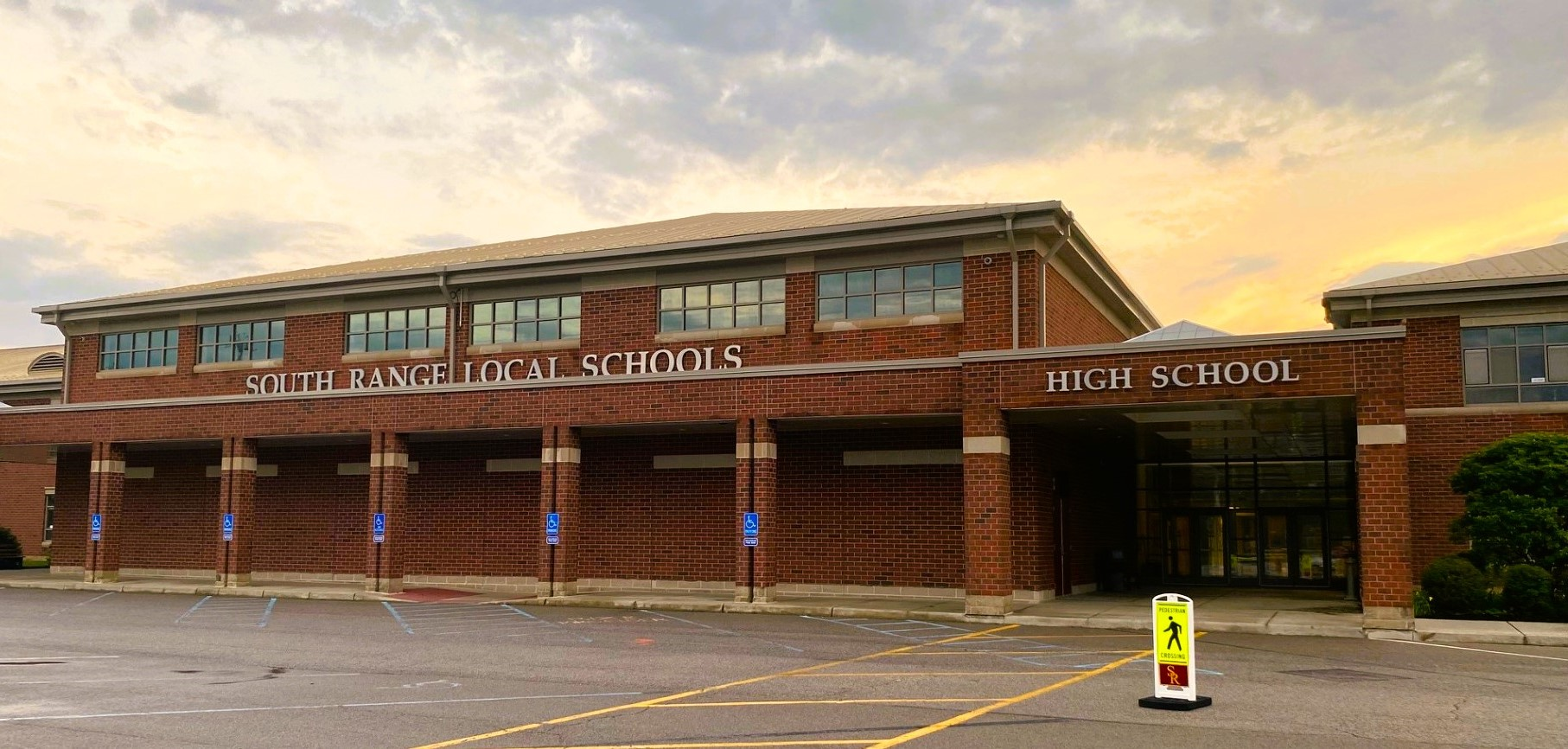

Location
- 11300 Columbiana-Canfield Road; Canfield, Ohio 44406; United States

Information
- Type: Public high school
- Established: 1969
- School district: South Range Local School District
- CEEB code: 363850
- NCES School ID: 390483603223
- Principal: Dan Szolek
- Faculty: 22.00 (on an FTE basis)
- Grades: 9–12
- Enrollment: 352 (2024–25)
- Student to teacher ratio: 16.00
- Campus type: Fringe rural
- Colors: Burgundy and gold
- Athletics conference: Northeast 8 Athletic Conference
- Team name: Raiders
- Website: srhs.southrange.k12.oh.us

South Range High School is a public high school in Beaver Township, Ohio, United States. It is the only high school in the South Range Local School District. Athletic teams are known as the Raiders and They compete as a member of the Ohio High School Athletic Association in the Northeast 8 Athletic Conference.

== History ==
South Range High School was opened in 1969 following the consolidation of the Greenford and North Lima School Districts. The former North Lima High School building housed the original high school until 2010, when South Range built their new K–12 building.

== Athletics ==
South Range High School currently offers:

- Baseball
- Basketball
- Cross country
- Football
- Golf
- Soccer
- Softball
- Swimming
- Track and field
- Volleyball
- Wrestling

=== OHSAA state championships ===
- Baseball – 2018
- Football – 2022

=== Other state championships ===
- Boys wrestling – 2022

*2022 wrestling title was a dual meet championship sponsored by the OHSWCA and not the OHSAA itself. Dual meet championships were no longer sanctioned by the OHSAA after the 2019–20 school year.
