= South Range Local School District =

School district in Ohio, United States

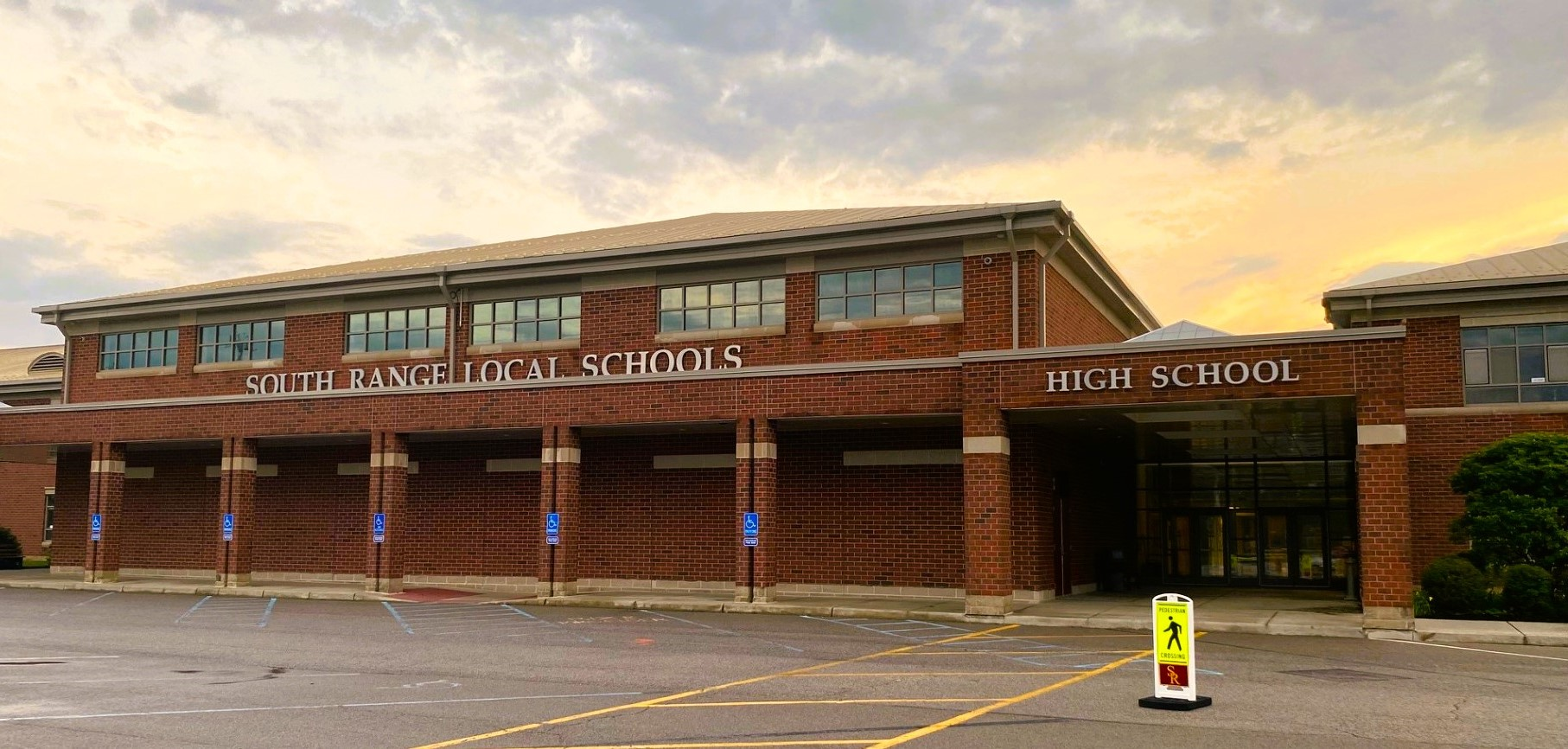
- South Range K-12 school building

Address
- 11300 Columbiana-Canfield Road Canfield, Ohio, 44406; United States

District information
- Type: Public
- Grades: PK–12
- Established: 1969; 57 years ago
- Superintendent: Jared Zapolnik
- Schools: 3
- NCES District ID: 3904836

Students and staff
- Students: 1,222 (2024–2025)
- Teachers: 68.80 (on an FTE basis) (2024–2025)
- Staff: 148.39 (on an FTE basis) (2024–2025)
- Student–teacher ratio: 17.76 (2024–2025)
- Colors: Burgundy and Gold

Other information
- Website: www.southrange.k12.oh.us

The South Range Local School District is a school district located in Canfield, Ohio, United States. The school district serves one high school, one middle school and one elementary school, all within its K-12 campus.

== History ==
The South Range Local School District was formed in 1969 following the merger of Greenford and North Lima School Districts. The former high school building was used as the former North Lima High School, with other grades were housed in Greenford.

In 2008, South Range began construction of their new K-12 Campus, which was opened in September 2010.

== Schools ==
=== High school ===
- South Range High School

=== Middle school ===
- South Range Middle School

=== Elementary school ===
- South Range Elementary School

=== Former schools ===
- Beaver Township School
