= U.S. Route 62 in Ohio =

Section of highway

U.S. Route 62
- US 62 in red, US 62T in blue

Route information
- Maintained by ODOT
- Length: 294.829 mi (474.481 km)
- Existed: 1934–present

Major junctions
- West end: US 62 in Aberdeen
- US 50 in Hillsboro; US 22 / SR 3 / US 35 in Washington Court House; I-70 in Columbus; US 40 in Columbus; I-71 in Columbus; US 36 in Howard; US 30 / SR 21 in Massillon; US 30 / I-77 in Canton; US 422 in Youngstown; I-80 / SR 7 in Hubbard
- East end: US 62 in Masury

Location
- Country: United States
- State: Ohio
- Counties: Brown, Highland, Fayette, Madison, Pickaway, Franklin, Licking, Knox, Holmes, Stark, Columbiana, Mahoning, Trumbull

Highway system
- United States Numbered Highway System; List; Special; Divided; Ohio State Highway System; Interstate; US; State; Scenic
| ← SR 61 | → SR 63 |

U.S. Route 62 (US 62) is a United States Numbered Highway spanning through Ohio from Aberdeen to Hubbard. Near Killbuck, in Amish Country, it is also marked as an Ohio Byway.

== Route description ==
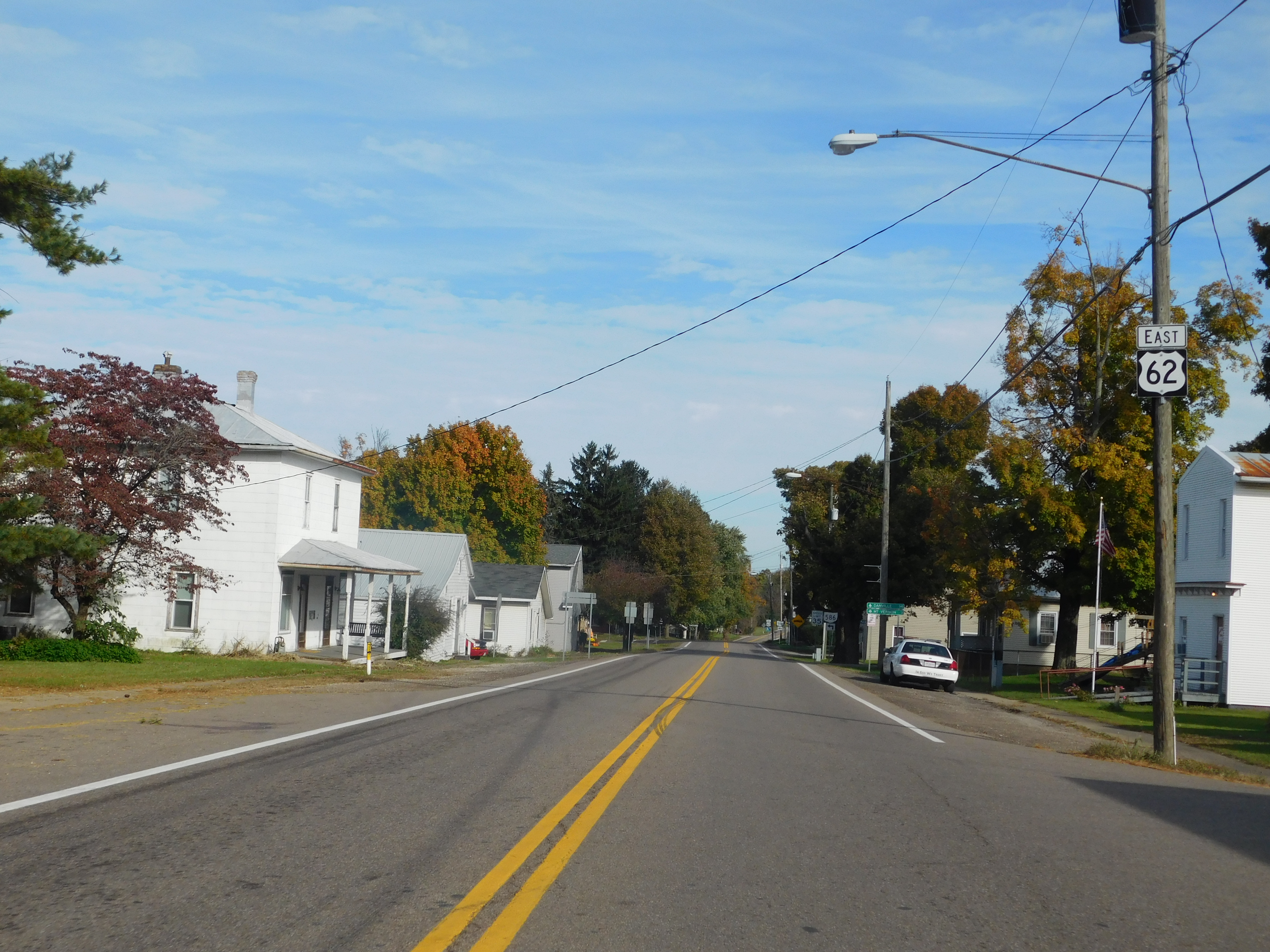
US 62 in Martinsburg

US 62 enters Ohio from Kentucky, crossing the Ohio River via the Simon Kenton Memorial Bridge at Aberdeen. The highway is immediately concurrent with US 52. 2.4 miles (3.9 km) later, the highway gains an additional concurrency with US 68, which crosses the river via the William H. Harsha Bridge. At Ripley, US 52 leaves the concurrency, at which point US 62 and US 68 head north for 5.3 miles (8.5 km) as a generally rural two-lane highway. In Brown County's Jefferson Township, near Redoak and southeast of Georgetown, US 68 leaves the concurrency. Afterward, US 62 enters the towns of Russellville, Hillsboro, and Washington Court House. In Washington Court House, US 62 meets up with State Route 3 (SR 3) and continues all the way into Columbus, passing through the towns of Mount Sterling, Orient, Harrisburg, and Grove City. After heading toward downtown Columbus, US 62 diverts from SR 3 onto US 40 (Broad Street) for a few blocks to Nelson Road. US 62 runs concurrently with Interstate 670 (I-670) near John Glenn Columbus International Airport until the eastern side of I-270 where US 62 heads toward Gahanna, New Albany, Johnstown, Utica, Millersburg, and Navarre. About 2.6 miles (4.2 km) north of Navarre, US 62 joins up with US 30 into Canton, where US 62 heads north along I-77. The highway passes West Lawn Cemetery and the President William McKinley memorial and tomb in Canton. At exit 107B on I-77, US 62 heads northeast to Alliance. US 62's departure from Alliance then heads east toward Salem and Canfield.

Crossing into a more suburban landscape in a northeast direction, before Youngstown, US 62 enters the Cornersburg neighborhood. Leaving Cornersburg, US 62 dips into Mill Creek Park. US 62 is carried over Mill Creek by a historic open-spandrel arch bridge built in 1920. Immediately after this bridge, US 62 passes through the historic Idora Park neighborhood, before continuing on a more northward track toward Downtown Youngstown. It leaves Ohio near Hubbard and enters Pennsylvania near the interchange for I-80.

There is an area in Kentucky which carries the designation "Brigadier General Charles Young Memorial Historical Corridor"; after crossing the Simon Kenton Memorial Bridge, US 62 continues that designation in Ohio. The designation is in honor of Young, a pioneering figure in US history, and at his death, the highest-ranking Black officer in the Regular Army. The memorial historical corridor passes through Young's hometown of Ripley, then stretches northward to near Redoak in Brown County, where it leaves the US 62/US 68 concurrency and joins US 68 solely at the junction of those routes.

== Future ==
In Ohio, there are plans to reroute US 62 onto a divided highway from Alliance to Salem, part of a larger relocation of both US 62 and SR 14, then from downtown Youngstown to I-80 as part of the "Hubbard Arterial". Parts of the highway have long been completed to the north of Alliance and Salem; the portion northwest of Alliance is known in documents as US 62T, while the portion north of Salem not already carrying US 62 is known as SR 14T; neither carries a posted route, instead only carrying trailblazer markers indicating routes intersected at the termini.

Based on costs and environmental impacts, ODOT decided in 2018 not to extend US 62T to SR 11 in 2018.

== Major junctions ==
| County | Location | mi | km | Exit | Destinations | Notes |
|---|---|---|---|---|---|---|
| Ohio River | | 0.000 | 0.000 | | US 62 west – Maysville | Continuation into Kentucky |
| Ohio River | | 0.000 | 0.000 | Simon Kenton Memorial Bridge; Kentucky–Ohio state line | | |
| Brown | Aberdeen | 0.186 | 0.299 | | US 52 east – Manchester | Western end of US 52 concurrency |
| Brown | Aberdeen | 2.502 | 4.027 | | SR 41 north – West Union | |
| Brown | Aberdeen | 2.767 | 4.453 | | US 68 south – Lexington | Western end of US 68 concurrency |
| Brown | Ripley | 8.381 | 13.488 | | US 52 west – Higginsport | Eastern end of US 52 concurrency |
| Brown | Jefferson Township | 13.837 | 22.268 | | US 68 north – Georgetown | Eastern end of US 68 concurrency |
| Brown | Jefferson Township | 14.144 | 22.763 | | SR 353 east – Decatur | |
| Brown | Russellville | 18.349 | 29.530 | | SR 125 – Decatur, Georgetown | |
| Brown | Eagle Township | 26.495 | 42.640 | | SR 32 – Winchester, Sardinia | |
| Highland | Concord Township | 33.340 | 53.656 | | SR 321 south – Mowrystown | |
| Highland | New Market Township | 37.820 | 60.865 | | SR 136 south – Winchester | |
| Highland | Hillsboro | 44.770 | 72.050 | | SR 73 south (Muntz Street) to SR 247 | Western end of SR 73 concurrency |
| Highland | Hillsboro | 44.950 | 72.340 | | SR 138 west (South Street) | Western end of SR 138 concurrency |
| Highland | Hillsboro | 45.140 | 72.646 | | US 50 / SR 73 north (Main Street) | Eastern end of SR 73 concurrency |
| Highland | Hillsboro | 45.900 | 73.869 | | SR 138 east (Greenfield Pike) | Eastern end of SR 138 concurrency |
| Highland | Penn Township | 51.460 | 82.817 | | SR 72 north – Highland | |
| Highland | Leesburg | 55.730 | 89.689 | | SR 28 – Highland, Greenfield | |
| Fayette | Washington Court House | 69.468– 69.703 | 111.798– 112.176 | | US 35 – Dayton, Chillicothe | Access provided by US 22I (eastbound) and US 62I (westbound) |
| Fayette | Washington Court House | 70.663 | 113.721 | | US 22 west / SR 3 south (Clinton Avenue) / SR 41 south (Highland Avenue) | Western ends of US 22, SR 3, and SR 41 concurrencies |
| Fayette | Washington Court House | 70.900 | 114.102 | | N. Hinde Street (US 62D/SR 3D) | Western end of directional couplet |
| Fayette | Washington Court House | 71.146 | 114.498 | | SR 41 north (N. North Street) | Eastern end of SR 41 concurrency |
| Fayette | Washington Court House | 71.294 | 114.737 | | US 22 east (Washington Avenue) | Eastern end of US 22 concurrency |
| Fayette | Washington Court House | 71.772 | 115.506 | | E. Market Street (US 62D/SR 3D) | Eastern end of directional couplet |
| Fayette | Union Township | 73.608 | 118.461 | | SR 753 south | |
| Fayette | Union Township | 75.758 | 121.921 | | SR 38 north – Bloomingburg | |
| Madison | Mount Sterling | 86.130 | 138.613 | | W. Main Street (US 62D/SR 3D) | Western end of directional couplet |
| Madison | Mount Sterling | 86.496 | 139.202 | | SR 207 south | Western end of SR 207 concurrency |
| Madison | Mount Sterling | 86.764 | 139.633 | | SR 56 / SR 207 ends | Eastern end of SR 207 concurrency |
| Madison | Mount Sterling | 87.179 | 140.301 | | E. Main Street (US 62D/SR 3D) | Eastern end of directional couplet |
| Pickaway | Darby Township | 94.935 | 152.783 | | SR 762 east – Harrisburg, Orient | |
| Franklin | Pleasant Township | 97.050 | 156.187 | | I-71 – Columbus, Cincinnati | I-71 exit 94 |
| Franklin | Pleasant Township | 98.575 | 158.641 | | SR 665 (London-Groveport Road) – London, Groveport | |
| Franklin | Jackson Township | 103.525 | 166.607 | | I-270 | I-270 exit 2 |
| Franklin | Columbus | 107.315 | 172.707 | | I-70 | Westbound exit and eastbound entrance, access to eastbound I-70 via Sullivant Avenue; I-70 exit 98A |
| Franklin | Columbus | 108.825 | 175.137 | | I-70 west / I-71 south / SR 315 north – Dayton, Cincinnati, Worthington | SR 315 exit 1A |
| Franklin | Columbus | 110.105 | 177.197 | | US 23 south (Third/Fourth Streets) / US 33 east | Western end of US 23 and US 33 concurrencies |
| Franklin | Columbus | 110.535 | 177.889 | | US 23 north / US 33 west / SR 3 north (Third/Fourth Streets) / US 40 west / SR 16 west (Broad Street) | Eastern end of US 23, US 33, and SR 3 concurrencies; western end of US 40 and SR 16 concurrencies |
| Franklin | Columbus | 111.225 | 178.999 | | I-71 – Cincinnati, Cleveland | No access to I-71 north from US 62 east |
| Franklin | Columbus | 112.975 | 181.816 | | US 40 east (Broad Street) / SR 16 east | Eastern end of US 40 and SR 16 concurrencies |
| Franklin | Columbus | 115.065 | 185.179 | | I-670 west | Western end of I-670 concurrency, I-670 exit 8 |
| Franklin | Mifflin Township | 115.945– 116.505 | 186.595– 187.497 | | Stelzer Road (CR 177) / Johnstown Road (CR 377) / Cassady Avenue (CR 96) – Airport | I-670 exit 9; Johnstown Road not signed westbound; Cassady Road not signed eastbound |
| Franklin | Mifflin Township | 117.575 | 189.219 | | I-270 – Cleveland, Wheeling | Eastern terminus of I-670, I-670 exit 10 |
| Franklin | Gahanna | 119.145 | 191.745 | | SR 317 (Granville Street) | Northern terminus of SR 317 |
| Franklin | New Albany | 125.165 | 201.434 | | SR 605 (North High Street) | Southern terminus of SR 605 |
| Franklin | New Albany | 125.855 | 202.544 | | SR 161 – Worthington, Newark | Interchange |
| Licking | Johnstown | 133.725 | 215.210 | | SR 37 (Main Street) – Sunbury, Newark | |
| Licking | Burlington Township | 142.155 | 228.776 | | SR 657 – Centerburg, Newark | |
| Licking | Utica | 147.615 | 237.563 | | SR 13 – Mount Vernon, Newark | |
| Knox | Martinsburg | 153.945 | 247.750 | | SR 541 / SR 586 south – Coshocton, Fallsburg | Western end of SR 586 concurrency; western terminus of SR 541 |
| Knox | Martinsburg | 154.075 | 247.960 | | SR 586 north – Mount Vernon | Eastern end of SR 586 concurrency |
| Knox | Harrison Township | 160.125 | 257.696 | | SR 229 – Gambier, Newcastle | |
| Knox | Union Township | 164.105 | 264.101 | | US 36 | Interchange, access via unsigned US 36C |
| Knox | Danville | 167.875 | 270.169 | | SR 205 / SR 514 | Southern terminus of SR 205 and SR 514 |
| Holmes | Richland Township | 175.812 | 282.942 | | SR 206 – Walhonding | Northern terminus of SR 206 |
| Holmes | Killbuck Township | 184.028 | 296.164 | | SR 520 – Glenmont | Eastern terminus of SR 520 |
| Holmes | Killbuck Township | 184.426 | 296.805 | | SR 60 – Killbuck, Warsaw | |
| Holmes | Mechanic Township | 189.047 | 304.242 | | SR 83 south – Coshocton | Western end of SR 83 concurrency |
| Holmes | Millersburg | 191.951 | 308.915 | | SR 39 west / SR 83 north | Eastern end of SR 83 concurrency; western end of SR 39 concurrency |
| Holmes | Millersburg | 192.071 | 309.108 | | SR 241 – Mount Eaton | Southern terminus of SR 241 |
| Holmes | Berlin Township | 197.053 | 317.126 | | SR 557 – Charm, Farmerstown | Northern terminus of SR 557 |
| Holmes | Berlin Township | 198.757 | 319.868 | | SR 39 east – Sugarcreek | Eastern end of SR 39 concurrency |
| Holmes | Paint Township | 204.700 | 329.433 | | SR 515 – Walnut Creek | Northern terminus of SR 515 |
| Stark | Wilmot | 210.306 | 338.455 | | US 250 west (W. Main Street) | Southern end of USend of SR 586 concurrency250 concurrency |
| Stark | Wilmot | 210.376 | 338.567 | | US 250 east (E. Main Street) | Northern end of USend of SR 586 concurrency250 concurrency |
| Stark | Sugar Creek Township | 213.126 | 342.993 | | SR 93 south – Beach City | Southern end of SR 93 concurrency |
| Stark | Sugar Creek Township | 213.486 | 343.572 | | SR 93 north – Brewster | Northern end of SR 93 concurrency |
| Stark | Navarre | 218.206 | 351.169 | | SR 21 south (Main Street) | Southern end of SR 21 concurrency |
| Stark | Perry Township | 221.296 | 356.141 | 185 | US 30 west / SR 21 north – Massillon, Wooster | Northern end of SR 21 concurrency; southern end of US 30 concurrency |
| Stark | Perry Township | 223.186 | 359.183 | 187 | SR 627 (Richville Drive) | |
| Stark | Canton | 226.176– 226.656 | 363.995– 364.767 | 190 | Raff Road / Whipple Avenue | |
| Stark | Canton | 227.826 | 366.650 | — | Harrison Avenue | |
| Stark | Canton | 228.566 | 367.841 | 104 | I-77 south / US 30 east – Akron, East Liverpool | Northern end of US 30 concurrency; southern end of I-77 concurrency |
| Stark | Canton | 229.776 | 369.789 | 105 | SR 172 / Tuscarawas Street West – Aultman Hospital, Downtown, Massillon | |
| Stark | Canton | 230.606 | 371.124 | 106 | 13th Street Northwest – Cleveland Clinic Mercy Hospital, McKinley Memorial | |
| Stark | Canton | 231.636 | 372.782 | 107B | I-77 north – Akron | Northern end of I-77 concurrency |
| Stark | Canton | 231.706 | 372.895 | 107A | SR 687 west / Fulton Road NW – Tom Benson Hall of Fame Stadium, McKinley High School, Pro Football Hall of Fame | |
| Stark | Canton | 232.376 | 373.973 | 232 | Cleveland Avenue NW | |
| Stark | Canton | 233.466 | 375.727 | 233 | SR 43 (Market Avenue) | |
| Stark | Nimishillen Township | 239.636 | 385.657 | | SR 44 – Ravenna, Louisville | |
| Stark | Washington Township | 244.946 | 394.202 | | SR 173 west (Main Street) To SR 225 north (US 62T) – Ravenna | Southern end of SR 173 concurrency |
| Stark | Alliance | 248.346 | 399.674 | | SR 183 (S. Union Avenue) | |
| Columbiana–Mahoning county line | Knox–Smith township line | 254.306 | 409.266 | | SR 165 east – Beloit | |
| Columbiana–Mahoning county line | Butler–Goshen township line | 256.366 | 412.581 | | SR 534 north – Newton Falls | |
| Columbiana | Perry Township | 260.276 | 418.874 | | SR 45 south / SR 9 Truck south / SR 173 east – Salem, Lisbon | Northern end of SR 173 concurrency; southern end of SR 45 and SR 9 Truck concurrencies |
| Columbiana | Perry Township | 260.686 | 419.533 | | SR 14 – Salem, Ravenna | |
| Columbiana | Perry Township | 262.456 | 422.382 | | SR 14 Truck north to SR 14 | Southern end of SR 14 Truck concurrency |
| Columbiana | Perry Township | 262.706 | 422.784 | | SR 45 north – Lordstown | Northern end of SR 45 concurrency |
| Columbiana | Salem | 263.566 | 424.168 | | SR 9 south / SR 9 Truck ends / SR 14 Truck ends – Salem | Northern end of SR 9 Truck and SR 14 Truck concurrencies |
| Mahoning | Green Township | 264.986 | 426.454 | | SR 165 – Greenford, North Lima, Beloit, Sebring | |
| Mahoning | Canfield | 271.576 | 437.059 | | SR 446 | |
| Mahoning | Canfield | 272.376 | 438.347 | | SR 46 south | Southern end of SR 46 concurrency |
| Mahoning | Canfield | 272.466 | 438.492 | | US 224 (Main Street) | |
| Mahoning | Canfield Township | 273.816 | 440.664 | | SR 46 north | Northern end of SR 46 concurrency |
| Mahoning | Youngstown | 278.546 | 448.276 | | SR 625 south (Arden Boulevard) | |
| Mahoning | Youngstown | 279.176 | 449.290 | | SR 170 south (Glenwood Avenue) | |
| Mahoning | Youngstown | 280.186 | 450.916 | | SR 7 south (Market Street) | Southern end of SR 7 concurrency |
| Mahoning | Youngstown | 281.706 | 453.362 | | South Avenue to I-680 – Akron, Cleveland, Pittsburgh | No direct access to I-680 from northbound US 62 |
| Mahoning | Youngstown | 282.166 | 454.102 | | I-680 – Akron, Cleveland, Poland, Pittsburgh | Southbound exit and northbound entrance only |
| Mahoning | Youngstown | 282.746 | 455.036 | | SR 289 (Himrod Avenue, Wilson Avenue) to US 422 east | Northbound exit and southbound entrance only |
| Mahoning | Youngstown | 283.266 | 455.872 | | US 422 west – Warren | |
| Mahoning | Youngstown | 283.546 | 456.323 | | Albert Street to US 422 east | |
| Trumbull | Hubbard | 288.354 | 464.061 | | SR 304 west (W. Liberty Street) | Southern end of SR 304 concurrency |
| Trumbull | Hubbard | 289.157 | 465.353 | | SR 304 east (E. Liberty Street) / SR 616 south (S. Main Street) | Northern end of SR 304 concurrency |
| Trumbull | Hubbard Township | 290.508– 290.532 | 467.527– 467.566 | | I-80 – Cleveland, New York | |
| Trumbull | Hubbard Township | 291.192 | 468.628 | | SR 7 north – Brookfield, Yankee Lake | Northern end of SR 7 concurrency |
| Trumbull | Brookfield Township | 294.111 | 473.326 | | SR 82 west / Standard Avenue – Warren | |
| Trumbull | Brookfield Township | 294.829 | 474.481 | | US 62 north – Sharon | Continuation into Pennsylvania |
1.000 mi = 1.609 km; 1.000 km = 0.621 mi: Concurrency terminus; Incomplete access

== Related routes ==
=== Alliance temporary route ===
U.S. Route 62T
- Location: Alliance and Lexington Township
- Length: 4.67 mi (7.52 km)
- Existed: 1998–present

U.S. Route 62 Temporary (US 62T) is a 4.67-mile-long (7.52 km) bypass around the city of Alliance. US 62T, a four-lane highway, begins at US 62 (Atlantic Boulevard NE/State Street) in Stark County. US 62T then has a highway ramp at Beeson Street. Exit ramps provide access from US 62T to Beeson St NE, and then the highway merges onto State Route 225 (SR 225) and ends. Although the US 62T designation is unsigned, signs on the road read "To West US 62 / To State Route 225 North". The entire route is built to freeway standards with a speed limit of 65 miles per hour (105 km/h). US 62T was planned to extend to Youngstown by 2030, but based on costs and environmental impacts, ODOT decided in 2018 not to extend the route to SR 11.

The entire route is in Stark County. All exits are unnumbered.

| Location | mi | km | Destinations | Notes |
|---|---|---|---|---|
| Lexington Township | 0.00 | 0.00 | US 62 / SR 173 – Alliance, Canton | Diamond interchange |
| Alliance | 2.38 | 3.83 | Beeson Street | Diamond interchange |
| Lexington Township | 4.67 | 7.52 | SR 225 – Alliance, Ravenna | Diamond interchange |
1.000 mi = 1.609 km; 1.000 km = 0.621 mi

== See also ==
- Special routes of U.S. Route 62

U.S. Route 62
| Previous state: Kentucky | Ohio | Next state: Pennsylvania |
