= Ohio State Route 626 =

State highway in Mahoning County, Ohio, US

State Route 626

Route information
- Maintained by ODOT
- Length: 3.46 mi (5.57 km)
- Existed: 1937–present

Major junctions
- South end: SR 165 / CR 26 near North Lima
- North end: SR 7 near Boardman

Location
- Country: United States
- State: Ohio
- Counties: Mahoning

Highway system
- Ohio State Highway System; Interstate; US; State; Scenic
← SR 625	→ SR 627

State Route 626 (SR 626) is a north–south state highway in the northeastern portion of the U.S. state of Ohio. The southern terminus of SR 626 is at SR 165 approximately one and a half miles (2.4 km) southeast of the hamlet of North Lima. Its northern terminus is at SR 7 nearly two miles (3.2 km) south of the township of Boardman.

Established in the late 1930s, State Route 626 is a two-lane highway that primarily serves local traffic in the southeastern Mahoning County municipality of Beaver Township. Along its path, SR 626 is briefly concurrent with SR 164 to cross over the Ohio Turnpike (Interstate 76 or I-76) just west of the partial interchange it has with I-680.

== Route description ==
This state highway runs exclusively within Beaver Township in southeastern Mahoning County. SR 626 is not included within the National Highway System.

State Route 626 begins at the intersection of SR 165 and County Road 26 (East South Range Road) approximately one and a half miles (2.4 km) southeast of North Lima. Running northwesterly from that intersection, the two-lane state route passes a number of houses, with woods abutting the roadway along the way. At Miley Road, the highway turns to the north-northwest, and passes just to the west of the partial I-680 interchange off of the Ohio Turnpike (I-76). SR 626 then bends to the northwest, and comes into a T-intersection with SR 164. Here, SR 626 turns to the northeast, and runs concurrently with SR 164 for less than 0.1 miles (0.16 km) to cross the Ohio Turnpike, then resumes its solo trek to the northwest. The route passes by a couple of commercial buildings as it departs the intersection, then travels amidst a blend of wooded terrain and open fields with scattered homes along the way. SR 626 intersects County Road 30 (East Calla Road), then continues in a northwesterly fashion, crossing railroad tracks and then passing by the Kreps Road intersection. Next, the highway passes into a more heavily residential setting, and intersects a number of side streets. Finally, SR 626 passes a couple of commercial businesses as curves to the west, passes a former alignment of the route (when it ended at a five-point signalized intersection), and ends approximately two miles (3.2 km) south of Boardman where it meets SR 7 in the community of Woodworth.

== History ==
SR 626 was created in 1937 along the routing that it currently occupies between SR 165 and SR 7. Except for a realignment away from the intersection of SR 7 and Western Reserve Road, the highway has not experienced any major changes since its inception.

== Major intersections ==
The entire route is in Beaver Township, Mahoning County.

mi	km	Destinations	Notes
0.00	0.00	SR 165 (Woodsworth Road) / CR 26 (South Range Road)	
1.09	1.75	SR 164 south (South Avenue)	Southern end of SR 164 concurrency
1.18	1.90	SR 164 north (South Avenue)	Northern end of SR 164 concurrency
3.46	5.57	SR 7 (Market Street)	
1.000 mi = 1.609 km; 1.000 km = 0.621 mi: Concurrency terminus
