= Ohio State Route 173 =

East-west state highway in northeastern Ohio, US

State Route 173

Route information
- Maintained by ODOT
- Length: 20.98 mi (33.76 km)
- Existed: 1923–present

Major junctions
- West end: SR 44 / CR 31 in Marlboro Township
- US 62 from Alliance to Salem; SR 183 in Alliance; SR 14 in Salem
- East end: SR 9 / SR 14 in Salem

Location
- Country: United States
- State: Ohio
- Counties: Stark, Mahoning, Columbiana

Highway system
- Ohio State Highway System; Interstate; US; State; Scenic
← SR 172	→ SR 174

State Route 173 (SR 173) is located in northeastern Ohio, and runs east–west from State Route 44, about 4 miles (6.4 km) north of Louisville, Ohio to State Route 14 and State Route 9 in downtown Salem, Ohio. It primarily passes through Stark and Columbiana counties, though it also straddles the county line between Mahoning County and Columbiana County for some of its length. Much of the route is also run in concurrency with U.S. Route 62.

== History ==
SR 173 was commissioned in 1923, originally routed from SR 19. northeast of Louisville, to SR 19, south of Beloit. In 1927 the route was rerouted onto the route of previous SR 19, through Alliance. The route was extended west to its current western terminus, at SR 44, in 1937. Between 1969 and 1971, SR 173 was rerouted concurrent with US 62 from west of Alliance to Salem. In 1976 US 62 in Salem was rerouted to bypass the city and SR 173 remained on the old route of US 62.

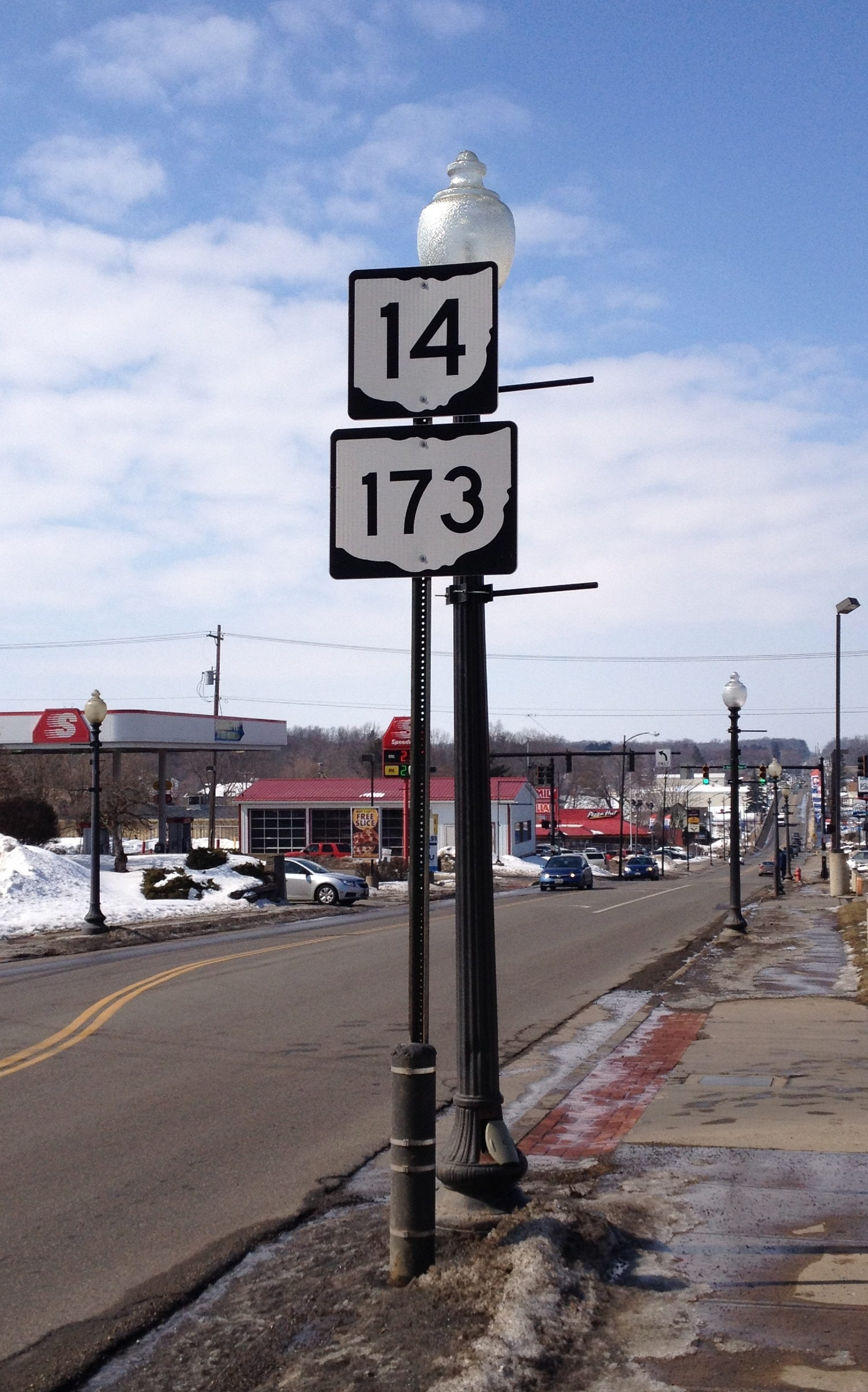
Looking west from OH 173's eastern terminus, concurrent with OH 14 in Salem.

== Major intersections ==
County	Location	mi	km	Destinations	Notes
Stark	Nimishillen–Marlboro township line	0.00	0.00	SR 44 (Ravenna Avenue NE) / CR 31 west (State Street NE) – Louisville, Ravenna	
Stark	Lexington–Washington township line	4.60	7.40	US 62 west / US 62T east to SR 225 – Canton, Ravenna	Western end of US 62 concurrency, western terminus of unsigned US 62T
Stark	Alliance	7.80	12.55	SR 183 (South Union Avenue)	
Columbiana–Mahoning county line	Knox–Smith township line	13.74	22.11	SR 165 east (Beloit-Snodes Road) / CR 404 south (Westville-Lake Road) – Beloit	Western terminus of SR 165
Columbiana–Mahoning county line	Butler–Goshen township line	15.80	25.43	SR 534 north (South Pricetown Road) / Morris Street – Newton Falls	Southern terminus of SR 534
Columbiana	Perry Township	19.71	31.72	US 62 east / SR 45	Eastern terminus of US 62 concurrency
Columbiana	Salem	20.33	32.72	SR 14 west (Benton Road) / Dodge Drive – Ravenna	Western terminus of SR 14 concurrency
Columbiana	Salem	20.98	33.76	SR 9 / SR 14 east (Ellsworth Avenue / East State Street)	Eastern terminus of SR 14 concurrency
1.000 mi = 1.609 km; 1.000 km = 0.621 mi: Concurrency terminus
