= Ohio State Route 43 =

State highway in northeastern Ohio, US

State Route 43
- Route of SR 43 highlighted in red

Route information
- Maintained by ODOT
- Length: 122.53 mi (197.19 km)
- Existed: 1924–present

Major junctions
- South end: SR 7 in Steubenville
- US 22 in Wintersville; SR 39 / SR 9 / SR 332 in Carrollton; US 30 in Canton; US 62 near Canton; I-76 in Brimfield Township; SR 14 / SR 303 in Streetsboro; I-77 / I-490 in Cleveland; I-90 in Cleveland
- West end: US 6 / US 20 / US 422 / SR 8 / SR 14 / SR 87 at Public Square in Cleveland

Location
- Country: United States
- State: Ohio
- Counties: Jefferson, Carroll, Stark, Portage, Geauga, Cuyahoga

Highway system
- Ohio State Highway System; Interstate; US; State; Scenic
← SR 42	→ SR 44

State Route 43 (SR 43) is a mainly north–south state highway that runs through the northeastern quadrant of the U.S. state of Ohio. Its southern terminus is at a signalized intersection with State Route 7 along the Ohio River in Steubenville, and its western terminus is approximately 123 miles (198 km) to the north at Public Square in Cleveland. It is one of ten routes to enter Public Square.

Created in the mid-1920s, State Route 43 starts out in Steubenville, and runs northwesterly to Canton via Carrollton. From Canton, the highway runs northerly through Kent and Streetsboro to Aurora, where it then turns northwesterly through Solon, Ohio, and continues passing through suburban Cleveland before entering the city proper, and coming to an end in downtown at Public Square. For its northernmost stretch of less than 1 mile (1.6 km), State Route 43 shares the same portion of pavement as four other highways at the same time: U.S. Route 422, State Route 8, State Route 14 and State Route 87. The five routes share a common endpoint in the middle of Public Square, where they intersect U.S. Route 6 and U.S. Route 20.

== Route description ==
State Route 43 runs through the counties of Jefferson, Carroll, Stark, Portage, Geauga and Cuyahoga.

The portion of State Route 43 beginning with its concurrent section with U.S. Route 30 in Canton, north through Kent and to Aurora, then northwest to the State Route 91 junction in Solon is included within the National Highway System, a system of highways deemed most important for the country's economy, defense and mobility.

=== Jefferson County ===
Beginning in Jefferson County at its southern terminus at a signalized intersection with State Route 7 in Steubenville along the Ohio River and the Ohio-West Virginia border across from Weirton, West Virginia, State Route 43 follows Washington Street northwesterly before becoming a short divided highway just west of downtown. State Route 43 then becomes Sunset Boulevard, and heads westerly into Wintersville, where it is known as Main Street. The state highway then departs the town to the northwest along Canton Road, leading up to a diamond interchange with the U.S. Route 22 freeway. State Route 43 next runs northwesterly into the village of Richmond, where it is briefly co-signed with State Route 152. State Route 43 then trends westerly into the unincorporated community of East Springfield, before turning northerly and passing through the small village of Amsterdam, where it is briefly joined by State Route 164. State Route 43 departs Jefferson County as it exits the village to the northwest, and enters into Carroll County.

=== Carroll County ===
State Route 43 is almost entirely rural in Carroll County, where it runs northwesterly into Harlem Springs along Steubenville Road, then turns westerly to its junction with State Route 9. The two highways then converge, and run northwesterly into Carrollton. State Route 9 and State Route 43 meet State Route 39 on the eastern outskirts of town, and the three highways run together northwesterly along East Main Street into downtown Carrollton and the junction with State Route 332, where State Route 9 departs to the north via North Lisbon Street. State Route 39 and State Route 43 then continue together along West Main Street to the Canton Road intersection, where State Route 43 splits from State Route 39, and follows Canton Road northerly out of Carrollton. The state route turns northwesterly, and comes to its eastern intersection with State Route 183 just east of Malvern. The two state routes run westerly through Malvern along Canal Street, then onto Alliance Road after departing the village, and ultimately to the point where they cross into Stark County.

=== Stark County ===
Into Stark County, State Route 43 jointly heads westerly with State Route 183 to the T-intersection that marks their western split just north of Waynesburg. Turning north, State Route 43 soon meets State Route 44 at its southern terminus. Turning northwesterly into rural Sandy Township, State Route 43 makes its way up into Canton. In Canton, running just to the east of, but never intersecting Interstate 77, State Route 43 has junctions with U.S. Route 30, State Route 172, State Route 153 and U.S. Route 62. State Route 43 then enters Plain Township, and passes northerly through a portion of Lake Township prior to entering Hartville, where it meets State Route 619. After duplexing with State Route 619 for a short distance westerly, State Route 43 turns northerly again, and enters into Portage County.

=== Portage County ===
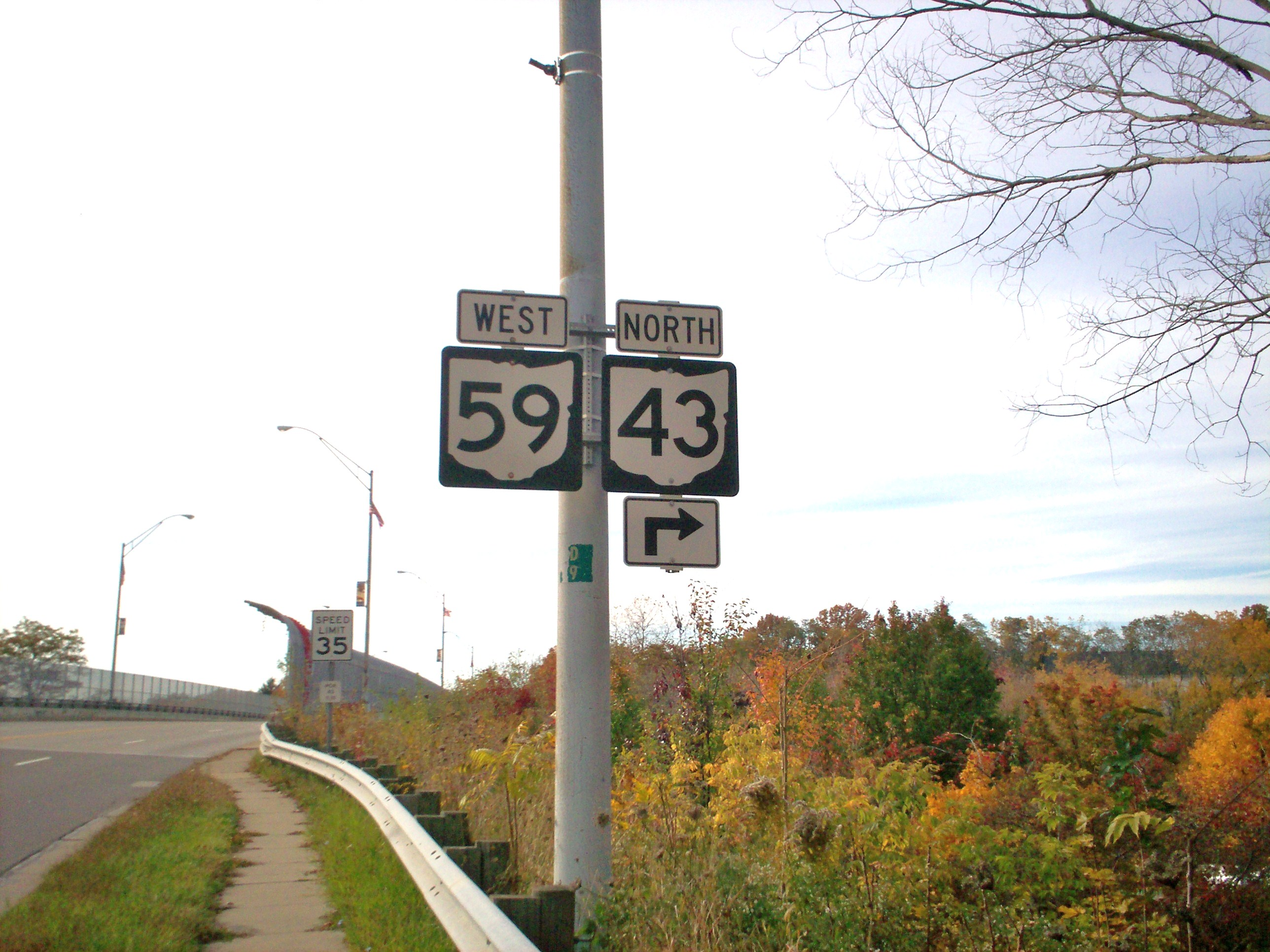
State Routes 59 and 43 cosigned in Kent

State Route 43 heads north through Suffield Township, where it meets U.S. Route 224. Further north, after crossing the Mogadore Reservoir, State Route 43 meets Interstate 76 at Exit 33 just south of Kent in Brimfield. Continuing north, the state highway enters Kent along South Water Street, and passes just to the west of the campus of Kent State University. Downtown, State Route 43 turns west onto Haymaker Parkway and is briefly co-signed with State Route 59 as it crosses the Cuyahoga River. Turning north again, State Route 43 is split into two one-way roads, with southbound traffic on North and South Mantua Streets, and northbound traffic using Gougler Avenue and River Street. When the two directions of traffic converge into North Mantua Street, State Route 43 becomes a four- to five-lane roadway. It runs north into Streetsboro where it meets cosigned State Route 14 and State Route 303. After crossing underneath the Ohio Turnpike, State Route 43 continues north into Aurora and is known as Chillicothe Road. Splitting from Chillicothe Road at the intersection marking the southern terminus of State Route 306 in downtown Aurora, State Route 43 turns to the northwest onto Aurora Road, and crosses State Route 82. As it passes the former sites of Geauga Lake and Wildwater Kingdom, State Route 43 enters Geauga County.

=== Geauga County ===
State Route 43 clips the southwestern corner of the county in Bainbridge Township. The route is less than 1 mile (1.6 km) long in Geauga County. The posted direction changes from north–south to the southeast to east–west to the northwest in this small section, as of 2008. State Route 43 leaves Geauga County and then enters Cuyahoga County.

=== Cuyahoga County ===
Entering into Cuyahoga County at Solon northwesterly along Aurora Road, State Route 43 meets State Route 91 (S.O.M. Center Road) in the downtown of the city. Into Bedford Heights, State Route 43 passes under the triangular interchange between Interstate 271, Interstate 480 and U.S. Route 422. On the other side of the triangle, the state highway passes through North Randall, where it briefly follows State Route 8 north before turning northwest onto Miles Road. After going through Warrensville Heights, State Route 43 enters Cleveland. At the Broadway Avenue intersection, State Route 43 meets State Route 14, and the two highways converge. From this point into downtown Cleveland, State Route 43 is no longer signed, although it has been in the past. The combined state routes run northwesterly through the Slavic Village neighborhood, cross through partial interchanges with Interstate 77 and Interstate 490, and converge with U.S. Route 422, State Route 8 and State Route 87 onto Ontario Avenue. After intersecting Interstate 90, State Route 43 comes to an end along with the other four routes it is combined with at Public Square in downtown Cleveland, where the highways meet U.S. Route 6 and U.S. Route 20.

== History ==
State Route 43 is one of the original state highways, though the initial designation as State Route 43 was only applied on the segment between Steubenville and Canton. Until 1926, the section of modern State Route 43 from Canton to Aurora was signed as State Route 89 while the section from Aurora to its northern junction with State Route 14 was designated as State Route 82. In 1930, State Route 43 was rerouted along a previously unnumbered road which put it approximately one mile west of North Olmsted. This section of road would be renumbered as State Route 17 in 1934. The section from North Randall to downtown Cleveland was part of State Route 8 from 1931 to 1938. By 1939, State Route 43 was extended to downtown Cleveland, cosigned with State Route 14. In 1975, State Route 43 was rerouted in Kent along the recently completed Haymaker Parkway. Previously it had followed South Water Street to Kent's center and then turned west over the Cuyahoga River along the Main Street bridge.

== Major intersections ==
County	Location	mi	km	Destinations	Notes
Jefferson	Steubenville	0.00	0.00	SR 7 / Washington Street	
Jefferson	Steubenville	0.78	1.26	Market Street	Interchange; southbound exit / northbound entrance from Adams Street
Jefferson	Steubenville	1.00	1.61	Lawson Avenue	Interchange; southbound exit to southbound Lawson Avenue only
Jefferson	Steubenville	1.28– 1.42	2.06– 2.29	Brady Avenue / University Boulevard to US 22 / SR 7	Interchange
Jefferson	Wintersville	7.41– 7.51	11.93– 12.09	US 22 – Steubenville, Cadiz	Interchange
Jefferson	Island Creek Township	7.79	12.54	SR 646 west – Scio	Eastern terminus of SR 646
Jefferson	Richmond	11.45	18.43	SR 152 north (Lisbon Street) – Empire	Southern end of SR 152 concurrency
Jefferson	Richmond	11.62	18.70	SR 152 south (Walnut Street) – Broadacre	Northern end of SR 152 concurrency
Jefferson	Amsterdam	21.55	34.68	SR 164 south (Springfield Street) – Kilgore	Southern end of SR 164 concurrency
Jefferson	Amsterdam	21.67	34.87	SR 164 north (North Main Street) – Bergholz	Northern end of SR 164 concurrency
Carroll	Lee Township	29.02	46.70	SR 9 south – Jewett	Southern end of SR 9 concurrency
Carroll	Center Township	33.90	54.56	SR 39 east – Wellsville	Southern end of SR 39 concurrency
Carroll	Carrollton	34.41	55.38	SR 9 north / SR 332 south (Lisbon Street) – Salem, Scio	Northern end of SR 9 concurrency; northern terminus of SR 332
Carroll	Carrollton	34.83	56.05	SR 39 west (Roswell Road) / Moody Avenue – New Philadelphia	Northern end of SR 39 concurrency
Carroll	Harrison Township	37.86	60.93	SR 171 – Waynesburg	
Carroll	Brown Township	44.10	70.97	SR 183 north – Minerva	Southern end of SR 183 concurrency
Stark	Sandy Township	49.52	79.69	SR 183 (south) – Waynesburg, Magnolia	Northern end of SR 183 concurrency
Stark	Sandy Township	49.72	80.02	SR 44 north – East Canton	Southern terminus of SR 44
Stark	Canton	59.15– 59.48	95.19– 95.72	US 30 east / Roshong Avenue – East Liverpool	Interchange; southern end of US 30 concurrency
Stark	Canton	60.40– 60.64	97.20– 97.59	US 30 west to Cherry Avenue / 11th Street / I-77 / US 62 – Massillion	Interchange; northern end of US 30 concurrency
Stark	Canton	61.25	98.57	SR 172 (Tuscarawas Street)	
Stark	Canton	62.06	99.88	SR 153 east (12th Street)	Western terminus of SR 153 (at Walnut Avenue)
Stark	Canton	63.36– 63.55	101.97– 102.27	US 62 to I-77 – Alliance	Interchange
Stark	Hartville	73.37	118.08	SR 619 east (East Maple Street) / Prospect Avenue	Southern end of SR 619 concurrency
Stark	Hartville	73.87	118.88	SR 619 (West Maple Avenue) / Steffy Avenue	Northern end of SR 619 concurrency
Portage	Suffield Township	78.30	126.01	US 224 – Barberton, Canfield	
Portage	Brimfield Township	83.77– 83.93	134.81– 135.07	I-76 – Akron, Pittsburgh	Exit 33 (I-76)
Portage	Kent	85.80	138.08	SR 261 – Ravenna, Tallmadge	
Portage	Kent	87.00	140.01	SR 59 east (Haymaker Parkway) / South Water Street	Southern end of SR 59 concurrency
Portage	Kent	87.23	140.38	SR 59 west (Haymaker Parkway)	Northern end of SR 59 concurrency
Portage	Streetsboro	93.75	150.88	SR 14 / SR 303 to Ohio Turnpike – Hudson	
Portage	Aurora	98.87	159.12	SR 306 north (Chillicothe Road) – Mentor	Southern terminus of SR 306
Portage	Aurora	99.23	159.70	SR 82 (Garfield Road) – Twinsburg	
Geauga	No major junctions				
Cuyahoga	Solon	105.88	170.40	SR 91 (S.O.M. Center Road)	
Cuyahoga	Solon–Bedford Heights city line	108.98	175.39	SR 175 north (Richmond Road)	Southern terminus of SR 175
Cuyahoga	Bedford Heights	110.70	178.15	SR 17 west	Eastern terminus of SR 17
Cuyahoga	Bedford Heights	110.98– 111.38	178.60– 179.25	I-480 to I-271 south – Youngstown, Cleveland, Toledo	Exit 25C (I-480)
Cuyahoga	Bedford Heights–Warrensville Heights city line	111.38	179.25	SR 8 south (Northfield Road)	Southern end of SR 8 concurrency
Cuyahoga	North Randall	111.65	179.68	SR 8 north (Northfield Road) / Miles Road to I-271 / I-480	Northern end of SR 8 concurrency
Cuyahoga	Warrensville Heights	112.09– 112.36	180.39– 180.83	Warrensville Center Road	Interchange
Cuyahoga	Cleveland	117.09	188.44	SR 14 east (Broadway) / Warner Road / Turney Road	Southern end of SR 14; end of signage for SR 43
Cuyahoga	Cleveland	119.84– 120.02	192.86– 193.15	I-77 south – Akron	Exit 161A (I-77); southbound SR 43 to I-77 southbound entrance / northbound I-77 exit only
Cuyahoga	Cleveland	120.25– 120.36	193.52– 193.70	I-490 to I-71 / Rockefeller Avenue – Sandusky	Exit 2B (I-490); eastbound I-490 exit / westbound I-490 entrance (via Rockefeller Avenue) only
Cuyahoga	Cleveland	121.62	195.73	US 422 east / SR 8 south / SR 10 east (Orange Avenue) / SR 87 / East 14th Street	Southern end of US 422 / SR 8 / SR 10 / SR 87 concurrency
Cuyahoga	Cleveland	121.83	196.07	I-77 south – Akron	Southbound exit only
Cuyahoga	Cleveland	121.88	196.15	I-90 west to I-71	Southbound exit and entrance; exit 171 (I-90)
Cuyahoga	Cleveland	121.95	196.26	SR 10 west (Carnegie Avenue)	Northern end of SR 10 concurrency
Cuyahoga	Cleveland	122.47	197.10	US 6 (South Roadway) / US 20 / US 422 / SR 8 / SR 14 / SR 87	Northern end of US 422 / SR 8 / SR 14 / SR 87 concurrency
Cuyahoga	Cleveland	1.000 mi = 1.609 km; 1.000 km = 0.621 mi: Concurrency terminus; Proposed; Incomplete access			
