= Ohio State Route 627 =

State highway in Stark County, Ohio, US

State Route 627

Route information
- Maintained by ODOT
- Length: 4.76 mi (7.66 km)
- Existed: 1987–present

Major junctions
- West end: US 30 / US 62 in Massillon
- East end: I-77 / CR 267 in Canton

Location
- Country: United States
- State: Ohio
- Counties: Stark

Highway system
- Ohio State Highway System; Interstate; US; State; Scenic
| ← SR 626 | → SR 628 |

State Route 627 (SR 627) is a 4.76-mile (7.66 km) east–west state highway in Stark County, Ohio. SR 627's western terminus is at a diamond interchange with the US 30/US 62 freeway in southeast Massillon. Its eastern terminus is a diamond interchange with Interstate 77 at I-77 Exit 101 in southern Canton.

== Route description ==
The entire routing of SR 627 is situated in the western portion of Stark County. SR 627 is not a part of the National Highway System, a system of routes considered to be most important for the economy, mobility and defense of the nation.

== History ==
A previous State Route 627 existed in Portage County from 1937 to 1970. The original route's southern terminus was at State Route 14 and U.S. Route 224 in Deerfield and the northern terminus was at State Route 82 just north of Windham. In 1941, the northern terminus was moved to State Route 5 in Paris after the section between SR 82 and SR 5 was decommissioned to make way for the new Ravenna Army Ammunition Plant. In 1970, the SR 627 designation was removed and the route was made part of a realigned and extended State Route 225.

The current SR 627 was established in 1987 along the routing between the US 30/US 62 and I-77 freeways that it utilizes to this day. The route has not experienced any major changes to its alignment since its inception.

== Major intersections ==
The entire route is in Stark County.

| Location | mi | km | Destinations | Notes |
|---|---|---|---|---|
| Massillon | 0.00 | 0.00 | US 30 / US 62 / Richville Drive – Canton, Wooster | Interchange |
| Canton | 4.76 | 7.66 | I-77 / CR 267 (Faircrest Street) – Akron, Marietta | Exit 101 (I-77) |
1.000 mi = 1.609 km; 1.000 km = 0.621 mi
