= Ohio State Route 35 =

In Ohio, State Route 35 may refer to:

- U.S. Route 35 in Ohio, the only Ohio highway numbered 35 since about 1934
- Ohio State Route 35 (1923), now SR 145 (Malaga to near Armstrongs Mills) and SR 9 (Armstrongs Mills to Salem)
