= Ohio State Route 224 =

State Route 224

Route information
- Maintained by ODOT

Location
- Country: United States
- State: Ohio

Highway system
- Ohio State Highway System; Interstate; US; State; Scenic
← US 224	→ SR 225

In Ohio, State Route 224 may refer to:

- U.S. Route 224 in Ohio, the only Ohio highway numbered 224 since about 1933
- Ohio State Route 224 (1923), now SR 177
