= Ohio State Route 332 =

State highway in eastern Ohio, US

State Route 332

Route information
- Maintained by ODOT
- Length: 12.89 mi (20.74 km)
- Existed: 1933–present

Major junctions
- South end: SR 151 near Scio
- North end: SR 9 / SR 39 / SR 43 in Carrollton

Location
- Country: United States
- State: Ohio
- Counties: Harrison, Carroll

Highway system
- Ohio State Highway System; Interstate; US; State; Scenic
← SR 331	→ SR 333

State Route 332 (SR 332) is a north–south state highway in the eastern portion of the U.S. state of Ohio. The highway's southern terminus is at a T-intersection with State Route 151 approximately 0.75 miles (1.21 km) northwest of the village limits of Scio. Its northern terminus is in downtown Carrollton at its junction with the triplex of State Route 9, State Route 39 and State Route 43.

== Route description ==
Along its way, State Route 332 passes through portions of Harrison and Carroll Counties. This state route is not included as a part of the National Highway System, a network of highways deemed most important for the economy, mobility and defense of the nation.

== History ==
State Route 332 first appeared in 1933, routed along the alignment that it maintains to this day through northern Harrison County and southern Carroll County. No changes of major significance have taken place to the highway since its designation.

== Major intersections ==
County	Location	mi	km	Destinations	Notes
Harrison	North Township	0.00	0.00	SR 151 (Scio Bowerston Road) – Scio, Hopedale, Bowerston	
Carroll	Perry Township	4.61	7.42	SR 164 (Amsterdam Road) – Leesville, Amsterdam	
Carroll	Carrollton	12.89	20.74	SR 9 (North Lisbon Street) / SR 39 / SR 43 (Main Street) – Salem, Amsterdam, Cadiz, Dellroy	
1.000 mi = 1.609 km; 1.000 km = 0.621 mi
