= Ohio State Route 44 =

State highway in northeastern Ohio, US

State Route 44
- Route of SR 44 highlighted in red

Route information
- Maintained by ODOT
- Length: 81.23 mi (130.73 km)
- Existed: 1924–present

Major junctions
- South end: SR 43 near Waynesburg
- US 30 in East Canton; US 62 in Nimishillen Township; US 224 in Randolph Township; I-76 / SR 5 near Ravenna; I-80 / Ohio Turnpike near Mantua; US 422 in Auburn Township; US 322 in Munson Township; US 6 in Chardon; I-90 in Concord; SR 2 in Painesville; SR 283 in Mentor
- North end: CR 518 at Headlands Beach State Park, in Painesville Township

Location
- Country: United States
- State: Ohio
- Counties: Stark, Portage, Geauga, Lake

Highway system
- Ohio State Highway System; Interstate; US; State; Scenic
← SR 43	→ SR 45

State Route 44 (SR 44) is a north–south state highway in the northeastern portion of the U.S. state of Ohio. It runs from a southern terminus at State Route 43 in Waynesburg to a northern terminus at the entrance to Headlands Beach State Park near Painesville. spans from Painesville Township in the north to Waynesburg in the south. Various sections of SR 44 are named for individuals.

== Major junctions ==
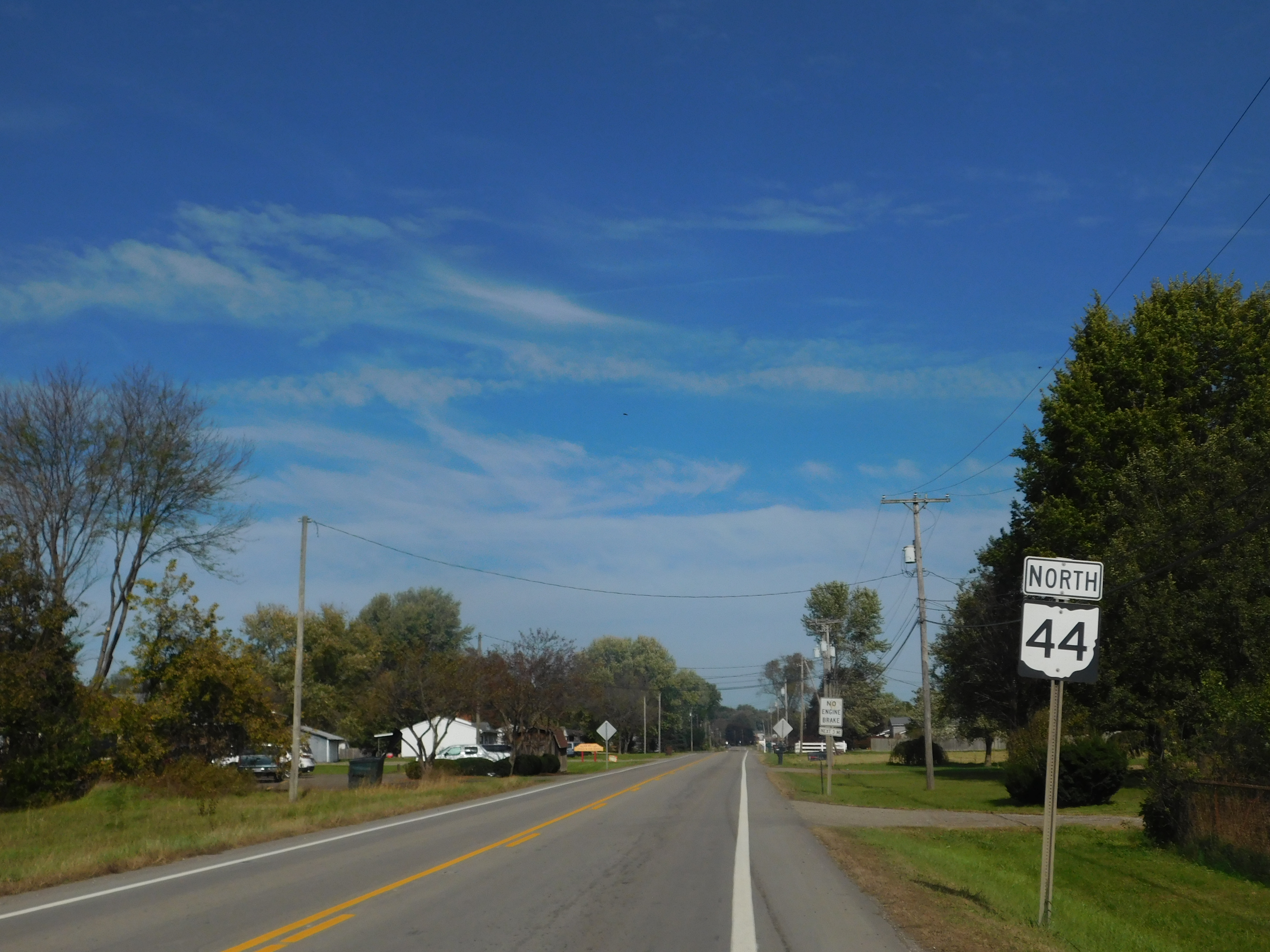
SR 44 north from SR 43 in Waynesburg

County	Location	mi	km	Exit	Destinations	Notes
Stark	Sandy Township	0.00	0.00		SR 43 (Waynesburg Drive)	
Stark	Osnaburg Township	7.84	12.62		US 30 east – Minerva	Southern end of US 30 concurrency
Stark	East Canton	8.68	13.97		US 30 west (Walnut Street) / Wood Street	Northern end of US 30 concurrency
Stark	East Canton	8.84	14.23		SR 172 (Nassau Street)	
Stark	Louisville	12.74	20.50		SR 153 (Main Street)	
Stark	Nimishillen Township	14.28– 14.52	22.98– 23.37		US 62 – Alliance, Canton	Interchange
Stark	Nimishillen–Marlboro township line	17.19	27.66		SR 173 east / CR 31 (State Street) – Alliance	Western terminus of SR 173
Stark	Marlboro Township	20.69	33.30		SR 619 – Hartville, Alliance	
Portage	Randolph Township	26.10	42.00		US 224 – Barberton, Canfield	
Portage	Rootstown Township	31.52– 31.70	50.73– 51.02		I-76 / SR 5 begins – Pittsburgh, Akron	Exit 38 (I-76); southern end of SR 5 concurrency
Portage	Rootstown Township	31.97	51.45		SR 44C / CR 74 (South Prospect Street) – Ravenna	Northbound exit / southbound entrance only; southern terminus of unsigned SR 44C
Portage	Ravenna Township	34.98– 35.39	56.29– 56.95		SR 5 north / SR 14 east – Warren	Interchange; northern end of SR 5 concurrency; southern end of SR 14 concurrency
Portage	Ravenna Township	35.73	57.50		SR 59 – Warren	
Portage	Ravenna	37.30	60.03		SR 88 (Freedom Street) – Garrettsville, Hiram College	
Portage	Ravenna Township	38.10	61.32		SR 14 west / North Chestnut Street – Port Clinton	Northern end of SR 14 concurrency
Portage	Shalersville Township	42.37	68.19		SR 303 – Streetsboro, Windham	
Portage	Shalersville Township	42.81– 43.07	68.90– 69.31		I-80 / Ohio Turnpike – Toledo, Youngstown	Exit 193 (Ohio Tpk.)
Portage	Mantua Township	47.40	76.28		SR 82 – Aurora, Hiram, Hiram College	
Geauga	Auburn Township	52.50– 52.59	84.49– 84.64		US 422 – Warren, Cleveland	Exit 29 (US 422)
Geauga	Newbury Township	58.85	94.71		SR 87 – Burton, Cleveland	
Geauga	Munson Township	63.12	101.58		US 322 – Orwell, Cleveland	
Geauga	Chardon	66.55	107.10		US 6 west (Water Street) / South Hambden Street	Southern end of US-6 concurrency
Geauga	Chardon	66.80	107.50		US 6 east (North Hambden Street) / North Street	Northern end of US-6 concurrency
Lake	Concord Township	73.65– 73.89	118.53– 118.91		I-90 – Cleveland, Erie, PA	Exit 200 (I-90)
Lake	Concord Township			Southern end of freeway		
Lake	Concord Township	75.35– 75.96	121.26– 122.25	75	SR 84 to US 20 – Mentor, Painesville	
Lake	Painesville	77.00	123.92	76	To US 20 (Jackson Street)	Southbound exit; northbound entrance
Lake	Painesville Township	77.56– 78.22	124.82– 125.88	77	SR 2 east – Painesville	Southern end of SR 2 concurrency; exit 221 (SR 2)
Lake	Mentor	78.68– 78.83	126.62– 126.86	220	SR 2 west – Cleveland	Northern end of SR 2 concurrency
Lake	Mentor			Northern end of freeway		
Lake	Mentor	79.40– 79.68	127.78– 128.23	79	SR 283 / LECT – Grand River, Euclid	Interchange
Lake	Painesville Township	81.23	130.73		CR 518 (Headlands Road) / Headlands Beach State Park entrance	
1.000 mi = 1.609 km; 1.000 km = 0.621 mi: Concurrency terminus; Incomplete access; Tolled

== SR 44C ==
State Route 44C (SR 44C) is the 0.19-mile (0.31 km) approach of former SR 44 to the State Route 44/State Route 5 interchange in Rootstown Township, just north of Interstate 76.
