= Ohio State Route 344 =

State highway in Columbiana County, Ohio, US

State Route 344

Route information
- Maintained by ODOT
- Length: 10.12 mi (16.29 km)
- Existed: 1935–present

Major junctions
- West end: SR 9 / SR 14 in Salem
- SR 11 near Leetonia
- East end: SR 164 in Columbiana

Location
- Country: United States
- State: Ohio
- Counties: Columbiana

Highway system
- Ohio State Highway System; Interstate; US; State; Scenic
← SR 343	→ SR 345

State Route 344 (SR 344) is an east-west state highway lying entirely in Columbiana County, Ohio. Its western terminus is at State Route 14 and State Route 9 in downtown Salem, and its eastern terminus is along a concurrency with State Route 164 in downtown Columbiana.

== History ==
SR 344 was originally established, in 1935, originally routed from SR 45, west of Leetonia, to Columbiana. Between 1979 and 1981, the route was extended to Salem along what was SR 558, SR 558 was also rerouted to the south along some of the former SR 344. In that same year, the highway was rerouted between former SR 558 and Leetonia along a previously unnumbered road. No significant changes have taken place to this state route since 1981.

== Major intersection ==
The entire route is in Columbiana County.

Location	mi	km	Destinations	Notes
Salem	0.00	0.00	SR 9 / SR 14 (East State Street / Lincoln Avenue)	
Fairfield Township	8.19	13.18	SR 11 – East Liverpool, Youngstown	Interchange
Fairfield Township	8.35	13.44	SR 164 south – Lisbon	Western end of SR 164 concurrency
Columbiana	10.12	16.29	SR 164 north (Main Street) / East Park Avenue	Eastern end of SR 164 concurrency
1.000 mi = 1.609 km; 1.000 km = 0.621 mi: Concurrency terminus
