= Ohio State Route 446 =

State highway in Mahoning County, Ohio, US

State Route 446

Route information
- Maintained by ODOT
- Length: 1.51 mi (2.43 km)
- Existed: 1983–present

Major junctions
- West end: US 224 in Canfield
- US 62 near Canfield
- East end: SR 46 near Canfield

Location
- Country: United States
- State: Ohio
- Counties: Mahoning

Highway system
- Ohio State Highway System; Interstate; US; State; Scenic
← SR 444	→ SR 450

State Route 446 (SR 446) is an east–west state highway in the northeastern portion of the U.S. state of Ohio. The western terminus of SR 446 is at a T-intersection with U.S. Route 224 (US 224) in Canfield, approximately one mile (1.6 km) west of the downtown area. Its eastern terminus is at a Y-intersection with SR 46 about one mile (1.6 km) south of Canfield.

Created in the middle of the 1980s, SR 446, which runs entirely within Mahoning County, is a two-lane highway that bypasses Canfield to the southwest. It connects US 224 with SR 46, and intersects US 62 in the process.

== Route description ==
SR 446 is situated entirely within Mahoning County. The route is not included as a part of the National Highway System.

SR 446 begins at a T-intersection with US 224 in the western end of Canfield. The highway starts out heading south, and promptly departs Canfield and enters into the township of the same name. Abutted by forested lands with a few commercial businesses scattered along the way, SR 446 bends to the southeast, and arrives at its junction with US 62, a signalized intersection. Continuing southeast, the route passes a house, then meets the Mill Creek Metroparks Bikeway. Further southeast, it passes more commercial buildings, and is then bounded by farmland on the south side affiliated with Mill Creek Metroparks. SR 446 reaches its endpoint at this point at a Y-intersection with SR 46 just south of the city limits of Canfield.

== History ==
What is now designated as SR 446 was originally a part of SR 14, which at the time used this stretch of highway to connect concurrencies it had with US 224 and SR 46, respectively. What is now SR 14 between Deerfield and Columbiana via Salem was then known as Alternate State Route 14 (Alt. SR 14). In 1983, SR 14's routing was changed to replace what was Alt. SR 14. US 224 and SR 46 became solo routes in the stretches where they had previously been concurrent with SR 14, and the former segment of SR 14 bypassing Canfield to the southwest was given a new highway designation: SR 446.

== Major intersections ==
The entire route is in Mahoning County.

Location	mi	km	Destinations	Notes
Canfield	0.00	0.00	US 224 (Main Street)	
Canfield Township	0.76	1.22	US 62 (Lisbon Street)	
Canfield Township	1.51	2.43	SR 46	
1.000 mi = 1.609 km; 1.000 km = 0.621 mi
