= Ohio State Route 172 =

East-west state highway in northeastern Ohio, US

State Route 172

Route information
- Maintained by ODOT
- Length: 46.98 mi (75.61 km)
- Existed: 1923–present

Major junctions
- West end: US 30 near Dalton
- I-77 / US 62 in Canton
- East end: US 30 near Lisbon

Location
- Country: United States
- State: Ohio
- Counties: Wayne, Stark, Columbiana

Highway system
- Ohio State Highway System; Interstate; US; State; Scenic
← SR 171	→ SR 173

State Route 172 (SR 172) is an east–west state highway in the northeastern portion of the U.S. state of Ohio. Its western terminus is at its interchange with U.S. Route 30 (US 30) about one mile (1.6 km) west of East Greenville near Dalton, and its eastern terminus is at US 30 about two miles (3.2 km) west of Lisbon. The route stays near US 30 for its entire route, and some of the current Route 172 actually served as previous alignments of US 30.

SR 172 was commissioned in 1923, with another section commissioned in 1935 as a different state route number. In the late 1930s the two routes were contacted and made into one route, with the SR 172 designation. The route was extended to the west in the mid-1970s, concurrent with US 30 most of the way. The US 30 designation was removed from some of the concurrency in the mid-1990s.

The Lincoln Highway ran along portions of what is now SR 172 where US 30 also runs or used to run, from its west end to East Canton.

== Route description ==
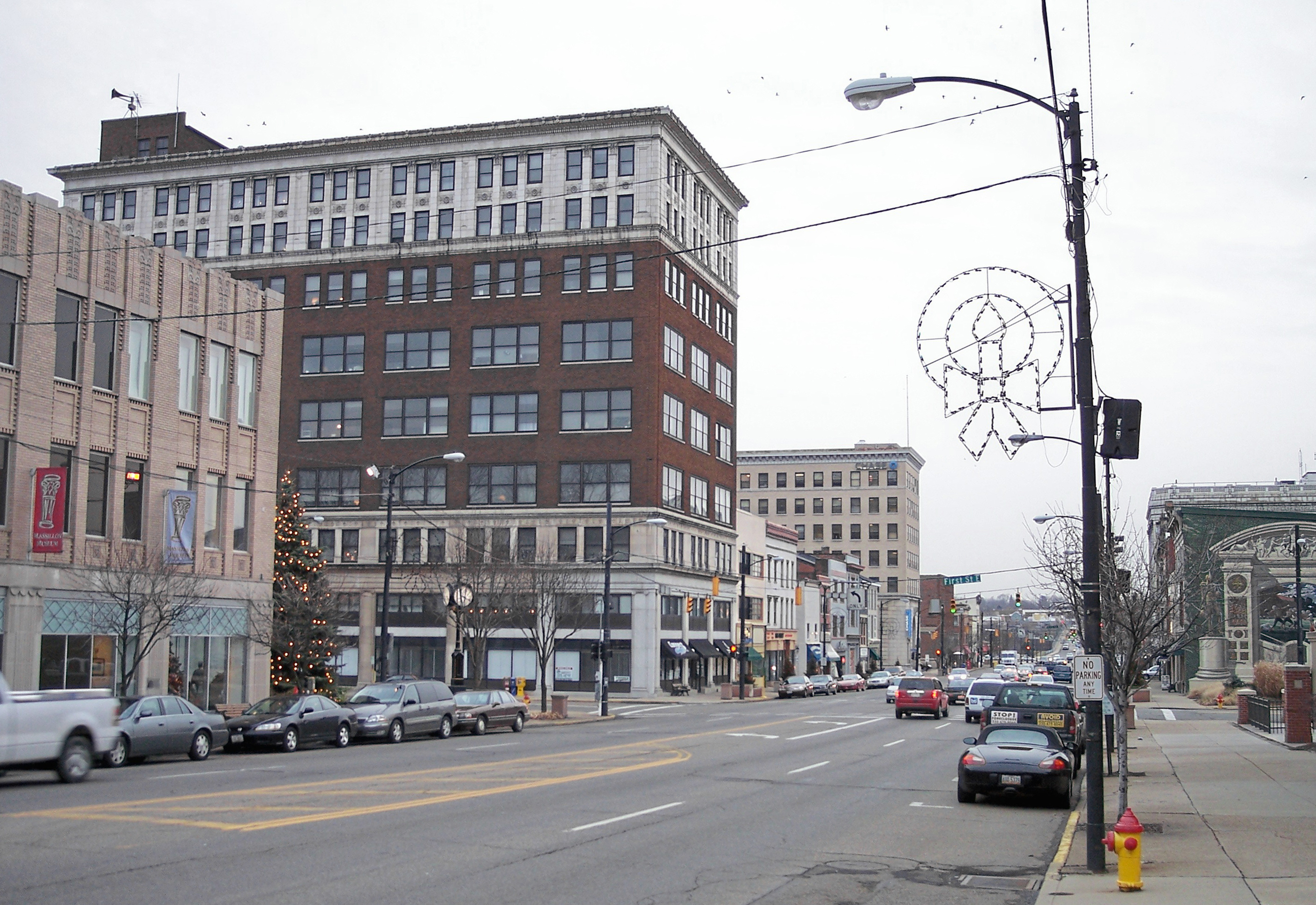
In Massillon in 2006

SR 172 begins at an incomplete interchange with US 30 in Wayne County, only eastbound US 30 has access to SR 172 and SR 172 must continue west onto US 30 west. The road heads east, into Stark County, as a two-lane highway, becoming a four-lane undivided highway. The highway passes farmland, woodland, residential properties. The route enters Massillon and passes through residential properties, as a four-lane road, becoming a two-lane road. The route turns towards the northeast and crosses over Norfolk Southern railroad tracks and the Tuscarawas River on the Four Chaplains Memorial Viaduct. After crossing over the river, the highway has an intersection with an access ramp that leads to SR 21. The route passes through commercial properties, before curving towards the southeast. As the road curves the highway leaves Massillon and passes through a mix of residential and commercial properties, as a four-lane highway. The road enters Canton and has an interchange with Interstate 77 (I–77) and US 62. The route curves towards the southeast and enters downtown Canton, passing the Stark county court house.

SR 172 leaves downtown Canton, as the highway narrows to a two-lane highway and crosses a Wheeling and Lake Erie railroad tracks and two Norfolk Southern railroad tracks. The highway passes through residential properties and leaves Canton, still passing through residential properties. The road has a traffic signal with US 30. US 30 and SR 172 head east concurrent, towards East Canton. The concurrency enters East Canton and US 30 turns southerly, with SR 172 continuing towards the east. The next block SR 172 has a traffic signal with SR 44. The route leaves East Canton, heading northeast passing through woodland and farmland. The road curves towards the east and continues through farmland, with some houses. The highway has an intersection with SR 9, before curving towards the southeast. As the highway nears US 30, it curves due east. After curving due east SR 172 ends at an intersection with US 30, west of Lisbon. There are no segments of SR 172 that are included as a part of the National Highway System (NHS).

== History ==
In 1923, SR 172 was established, routed from East Canton to New Franklin. The route between New Garden and US 30, west of Lisbon, was signed SR 354 in 1935. In 1939 SR 172 was extended to the current eastern terminus outside of Lisbon, replacing SR 354. In 1976 the route was extended to the current western terminus one mile (1.6 km) west of East Greenville, concurrent with US 30 between Canton and East Canton. Between 1993 and 1995, US 30 was removed from the concurrency with SR 172, between Canton and the current western end of the concurrency, east of Canton.

== Major intersections ==
County	Location	mi	km	Destinations	Notes
Wayne	Sugar Creek Township	0.00– 0.33	0.00– 0.53	US 30 west – Wooster	Western terminus of SR 172; no access to eastbound US 30 from SR 172 / access to SR 172 from westbound US 30
Stark	Tuscarawas Township	2.98	4.80	SR 93 – Brewster, Canal Fulton	
Stark	Massillon	7.00	11.27	Lillian Gish Boulevard to SR 21 / Tommy Henrich Drive	One-quadrant interchange
Stark	Massillon	7.21	11.60	SR 241 south (Erie Street)	Western end of SR 241 concurrency
Stark	Massillon	7.96	12.81	SR 241 north (Wales Road)	Eastern end of SR 241 concurrency
Stark	Canton	13.98– 14.36	22.50– 23.11	I-77 / US 62 – Cambridge, Akron	Exit 105 (I-77)
Stark	Canton	15.33	24.67	SR 43 south (Walnut Avenue) to I-77 / US 30	SR 43 on one way pair
Stark	Canton	15.43	24.83	SR 43 north (Cherry Avenue)	SR 43 on one way pair
Stark	Canton Township	18.18	29.26	US 30 west (Trump Avenue)	Western end of US 30 concurrency
Stark	East Canton	20.08	32.32	US 30 east (Cedar Street)	Eastern end of US 30 concurrency
Stark	East Canton	20.16	32.44	SR 44 (Wood Street)	
Stark	New Franklin	30.63	49.29	SR 183 (Union Avenue) – Alliance	
Columbiana	Hanover Township	39.85	64.13	SR 9 – Salem, Hanoverton	
Columbiana	Center Township	46.98	75.61	US 30 – Lisbon, Hanoverton	
1.000 mi = 1.609 km; 1.000 km = 0.621 mi: Concurrency terminus; Incomplete access
