= Ohio State Route 165 =

State highway in Ohio, US

State Route 165

Route information
- Maintained by ODOT
- Length: 32.31 mi (52.00 km)
- Existed: 1923–present

Major junctions
- West end: US 62 / SR 173 / CR 404 near Beloit
- US 62 near Salem; SR 164 in North Lima; SR 7 in North Lima
- East end: SR 4002 (Taggart Road) at the Pennsylvania state line near East Palestine

Location
- Country: United States
- State: Ohio
- Counties: Mahoning, Columbiana

Highway system
- Ohio State Highway System; Interstate; US; State; Scenic
← SR 164	→ SR 166

State Route 165 (SR 165) is a 32-mile-long (51 km), primarily east–west running state route located in Mahoning and Columbiana counties in northeast Ohio. The route runs through generally rural sections of southern Mahoning County, and serves East Palestine in extreme northeast Columbiana County. The route connects quite a few unincorporated villages in southern Mahoning County as it passes through. The western terminus is at U.S. Route 62 and State Route 173 just south of Beloit, and the eastern terminus is at the Pennsylvania state line just to the east of East Palestine, where it becomes Taggart Road and heads toward Pennsylvania Route 51.

== History ==
SR 165 was original established in 1923. It was originally routed from North Lima to East Palestine. In 1937 the route was extended to Beloit along previous unnumbered road. The highway was rerouted from Unity to Pennsylvania state line along previous Route 14, in 1946. Between 1969 and 1971 the route was extended to 1-mile (1.6 km) south of Beloit along previous Route 173.

== Major intersections ==
County	Location	mi	km	Destinations	Notes
Mahoning	Smith Township	0.00	0.00	US 62 / SR 173 (Alliance-Salem Road) / CR 404 south (Westville-Lake Road) – Alliance, Salem	
Mahoning	Goshen Township	5.03	8.10	SR 534 (South Pricetown Road) – Newton Falls	
Mahoning	Goshen Township	5.46	8.79	SR 14 (Benton Road) – Ravenna	
Mahoning	Green–Goshen township line	10.21	16.43	SR 45 (Salem-Warren Road)	
Mahoning	Green Township	11.21	18.04	US 62 (Youngstown-Salem Road) – Canfield	
Mahoning	Beaver Township	16.64	26.78	SR 46 (Columbiana-Canfield Road) – Columbiana, Canfield	
Mahoning	Beaver Township	20.33	32.72	SR 164 (South Avenue) – Youngstown	
Mahoning	Beaver Township	20.62	33.18	SR 7 (Market Street) – East Liverpool	
Mahoning	Beaver Township	21.80	35.08	SR 626 north (Woodworth Road) / East South Range Road	Southern terminus of SR 626
Mahoning	New Springfield	24.61	39.61	SR 617 east (East Garfield Road)	Western terminus of SR 617
Columbiana	Unity Township	28.70	46.19	SR 14 west – Columbiana	Western end of SR 14 concurrency
Columbiana	Unity Township	28.78	46.32	SR 170 north / Brookdale Avenue – Petersburg	Western end of SR 170 concurrency
Columbiana	Unity Township	29.32	47.19	SR 14 east / North Market Street	Eastern end of SR 14 concurrency
Columbiana	East Palestine	31.20	50.21	SR 170 south (North Market Street) / West Taggart Street	Eastern end of SR 170 concurrency
Columbiana	Unity Township	32.31	52.00	SR 4002 (Taggart Road) to PA 51 (Constitution Boulevard)	Pennsylvania state line
1.000 mi = 1.609 km; 1.000 km = 0.621 mi: Concurrency terminus
