= Ohio State Route 14 =

State highway in northeastern Ohio, US

State Route 14

Route information
- Maintained by ODOT
- Length: 80.56 mi (129.65 km)
- Existed: 1924–present

Major junctions
- West end: US 6 / US 20 / US 422 / SR 8 / SR 43 / SR 87 in Cleveland
- I-90 in Cleveland; I-490 in Cleveland; I-77 in Cleveland; I-271 in Oakwood; I-480 in Oakwood; I-80 Toll / Ohio Turnpike in Streetsboro; I-76 near Ravenna; US 62 / SR 45 in Salem; SR 7 / SR 46 near Columbiana
- East end: PA 51 at the Pennsylvania state line near East Palestine

Location
- Country: United States
- State: Ohio
- Counties: Cuyahoga, Summit, Portage, Mahoning, Columbiana

Highway system
- Ohio State Highway System; Interstate; US; State; Scenic
← SR 13	→ SR 15

State Route 14, located in northeastern Ohio, runs from U.S. Route 6/U.S. Route 42/State Route 3 in Downtown Cleveland southeasterly to the Pennsylvania state line near East Palestine; Pennsylvania Route 51 continues southeasterly from there.

== History ==
- 1924 – Original route established; original alignment was along its current alignment from Bedford to Unity, SR 170’s current alignment from Unity to East Palestine, and SR 165’s current alignment from East Palestine to the Pennsylvania state line.
- 1931 – Extended to Cleveland via the former alignment of SR 8.
- 1946 – Eastern terminus moved to current location via the former alignment of SR 165.
- 1951 – Aligned with US 224 from Deerfield to Canfield and with SR 46 from Canfield to Columbiana; Deerfield-Columbiana alignment changed to SR 14A (Alternate).
- 1957 – Routed around Ravenna via bypass route.
- 1966 – Freeway alignment from Bedford to current I-80 in Streetsboro was established and was dually signed with I-80.
- 1969 – Canfield bypass (current SR 446) added.
- 1971 – Bedford-Streetsboro freeway alignment designation changed to I-480/SR 14 (I-80 designation dropped).
- 1984 – Deerfield-Columbiana reverted to SR 14 designation; SR 14A designation dropped; Canfield bypass signed SR 446.

== Major intersections ==
County	Location	mi	km	Exit	Destinations	Notes
Cuyahoga	Cleveland	0.00	0.00		US 6 / US 20 / US 422 east / SR 8 south / SR 43 east / SR 87 south (Public Square)	Termini of US 422, SR 8, SR 43, SR 87
Cuyahoga	Cleveland	0.60	0.97		SR 10 west (Lorain Avenue) / I-77 south / I-90 west to I-71 – Akron, Airport	Eastern terminus of SR 10; exit 162B on I-77; exits 171A-B on I-90
Cuyahoga	Cleveland	0.90	1.45		US 422 east / SR 8 south / SR 87 east (Orange Avenue) to I-90 / Woodland Avenue	Eastern terminus of concurrency with US 422 / SR 8 / SR 87; future concurrency terminus with SR 10
Cuyahoga	Cleveland	2.20	3.54		I-490 west to I-71 – Toledo	Exit 2A on I-490
Cuyahoga	Cleveland	2.60	4.18		I-77 south – Akron	Exit 161A on I-77
Cuyahoga	Cleveland	5.50	8.85		SR 43 east (Miles Avenue)	Eastern terminus of concurrency with SR 43
Cuyahoga	Garfield Heights	7.70	12.39		I-480 – Toledo, Youngstown	Exit 23 on I-480
Cuyahoga	Maple Heights	8.80	14.16		SR 17 (Libby Road)	No eastbound left turns to SR 17 east
Cuyahoga	Oakwood	13.20	21.24	23	I-271 north / I-480 west	Western terminus of concurrency with I-271 / I-480
Cuyahoga	Oakwood	14.70	23.66	21	I-271 south – Akron, Columbus	Eastern terminus of concurrency with I-271
Summit	Twinsburg	18.90	30.42	36	SR 82 – Aurora, Twinsburg	
Summit	Twinsburg	19.70	31.70	37	SR 91 – Twinsburg, Hudson	
Summit	Twinsburg	24.34	39.17	41	Frost Road	
Portage	Streetsboro	24.70	39.75	42	I-80 Toll / Ohio Turnpike – Toledo, Youngstown I-480 ends	Eastern terminus of I-480; exit 187 on I-80 / Turnpike; exit number not signed westbound
Portage	Streetsboro	26.40	42.49		SR 303 west	Western terminus of concurrency with SR 303
Portage	Streetsboro	26.50	42.65		SR 43 – Aurora, Kent	
Portage	Streetsboro	26.70	42.97		SR 303 east	Eastern terminus of concurrency with SR 303
Portage	Ravenna	33.50	53.91		SR 44 north – Mantua, Portage County Airport	Western terminus of concurrency with SR 44
Portage	Ravenna	34.40	55.36		SR 88 – Garrettsville	
Portage	Ravenna Township	35.90	57.78		SR 59 – Warren	Former alignment of SR 5
Portage	Ravenna Township	36.30	58.42		SR 5 / SR 44 south	Interchange; eastern terminus of concurrency with SR 44
Portage	Edinburg Township	40.80	65.66		I-76 – Akron, Pittsburgh	Exit 43 on I-76
Portage	Edinburg Township	41.60	66.95		SR 183 south – Alliance	Northern terminus of SR 183
Portage	Deerfield Township	48.70	78.38		US 224 / SR 225 – Atwater, Canfield	Traffic circle
Mahoning	Goshen Township	56.00	90.12		SR 534 to SR 165 west	
Mahoning	Goshen Township	56.60	91.09		SR 165 – North Lima, Beloit	
Mahoning	Goshen Township	58.80	94.63		To US 62 east / SR 45 north (via SR 14T east)	Western terminus of SR 14T
Columbiana	Salem	61.10	98.33		US 62 / SR 45 – Canfield, Lisbon	
Columbiana	Salem	61.70	99.30		SR 173 west (State Street) – Alliance	Western terminus of concurrency with SR 173 (former US 62)
Columbiana	Salem	62.30	100.26		SR 9 south (Ellsworth Avenue) / SR 173 west	Western terminus of concurrency with SR 9 (former SR 45); eastern terminus of SR 173
Columbiana	Salem	62.60	100.74		SR 9 north / SR 344 south (Lincoln Avenue)	Eastern terminus of concurrency with SR 9 (former US 62); northern terminus of SR 344 (former SR 45)
Columbiana–Mahoning county line	Columbiana	70.90	114.10		SR 46 north to SR 11 – Lisbon	Western terminus of concurrency with SR 46
Columbiana–Mahoning county line	Columbiana	77.40	124.56		SR 164 to SR 11 – Columbiana, Youngstown	
Columbiana	Columbiana	73.70	118.61		SR 7 / SR 46 south – Youngstown, Rogers	Eastern terminus of concurrency with SR 46
Columbiana	Unity Township	78.90	126.98		SR 165 north – New Springfield	Western terminus of concurrency with SR 165
Columbiana	Unity Township	78.90	126.98		SR 170 north – Petersburg	Western terminus of concurrency SR 170
Columbiana	Unity Township	79.50	127.94		SR 165 south / SR 170 south – East Palestine	Eastern terminus of concurrency with SR 165 / SR 170
Columbiana	Unity Township	81.20	130.68		PA 51 south (Constitution Boulevard)	Continuation into Pennsylvania
1.000 mi = 1.609 km; 1.000 km = 0.621 mi: Concurrency terminus; Incomplete access; Tolled

== Route 14 Temporary ==
State Route 14 Temporary
- Location: Salem
- Length: 2.73 mi (4.39 km)

State Route 14 Temporary (SR 14T) is a 2.73-mile-long bypass around the city of Salem. SR 14T, a four-lane highway, begins at SR 14, Cleveland – East Liverpool Road, in Mahoning County. SR 14T crosses into Columbiana County and passes under County Route 61 and Goshen Road. SR 14T then has a diamond interchange with US 62 and SR 45. Exit ramps provide access from SR 14T to US 62 west and SR 45 south, and the two highways merge onto the SR 14T right-of-way as it continues past its terminus.

Although the SR 14T designation is unsigned, signs on the road read "TO US 62 / SR 45". The entire route is built to freeway standards with a speed limit of 65 miles per hour (105 km/h).

Major intersections

County	Location	mi	km	Destinations	Notes
Mahoning	Goshen Township	0.00	0.00	SR 14 – Salem, Ravenna	At-grade intersection
Columbiana	Perry Township	2.73	4.39	US 62 west / SR 45 south – Lisbon, Salem	Diamond interchange
Columbiana	Perry Township	2.73	4.39	US 62 east / SR 45 north	Continuation beyond eastern terminus
1.000 mi = 1.609 km; 1.000 km = 0.621 mi

== Route 14 Alternate ==
State Route 14A
- Location: Deerfield–Columbiana
- Existed: 1951–1984

State Route 14A existed from 1951 to 1984 and followed what has been State Route 14 outside of that period between US 224 and SR 46 (see History section).
