= Bob Mortimer (evangelist) =

American Christian evangelist and motivational speaker

Bob Mortimer (born July 25, 1954) is a Christian evangelist living in Gig Harbor, Washington, United States. He is a triple amputee who became a motivational speaker to churches, schools, prisons, and military bases.

== Biography ==
=== Early life and accident ===
Bob Mortimer was born July 25, 1954, in North Lima, Ohio. He has four older brothers and one younger sister. His father died of a drug overdose when Mortimer was 16 and his family then moved to Hoquiam, Washington. Mortimer began drinking and using drugs and these addictions worsened during the next few years.

When Mortimer was 21, he and his brother were driving home after a night of partying. The car veered off the road and hit a power pole, knocking the wires down. Mortimer walked into the live wires and was severely electrocuted. Over the next few months in the hospital, his legs were amputated above the knee and his left arm was cut off above the elbow.

In 1979, he met his future wife, Darla and became a Christian a year later. They married on June 6, 1981, in Auburn, Washington.

=== Ministry growth ===
After Mortimer was released from the hospital, he was invited to tell his story to students at the local high schools and middle schools. Eventually he chose speaking and ministering to be his full-time career and started traveling throughout the country.

He moved to Gig Harbor, Washington in 1992 and made it his ministry headquarters. Since then he has traveled internationally to work as a motivational speaker for the military and as a missionary, while continuing his local ministry. He also frequently shares his message at Luis Palau festivals across the country.

Mortimer and his wife now have three children: Nicole, Grant, and Chanel.

==== Hope and Courage Across America ====
Mortimer and his family started riding their bikes across the United States on May 17, 2008. Mortimer rode a three-wheeled handcycle customized for triple amputees. He and his family pedaled from their hometown, Gig Harbor to New York City and stopped at churches along the way. They reached the Statue of Liberty on September 12, 2008.

In April 2011, Mortimer published a book about this trip. It also tells the story of how he lost his limbs and became a Christian.
