= Ohio State Route 46 =

State highway in northeastern Ohio, US

State Route 46
- Route of SR 46 highlighted in red

Route information
- Maintained by ODOT
- Length: 76.66 mi (123.37 km)
- Existed: 1924–present

Major junctions
- South end: SR 170 in East Palestine
- SR 7 near Columbiana; SR 11 near Columbiana; US 62 / US 224 in Canfield; I-80 in Austintown; US 422 near Niles; US 322 in Colebrook; US 24 in New Lyme
- North end: SR 11 in Plymouth Township

Location
- Country: United States
- State: Ohio
- Counties: Columbiana, Mahoning, Trumbull, Ashtabula

Highway system
- Ohio State Highway System; Interstate; US; State; Scenic
← SR 45	→ SR 47

State Route 46 (SR 46) is a north–south state highway in the northeastern portion of the U.S. state of Ohio. Its southern terminus is at State Route 170 in East Palestine (this point is also the eastern terminus of State Route 558), and its northern terminus is at State Route 11 several miles south of State Route 531 in Plymouth Township. In its northernmost portion, from south of Ashtabula to Cortland, Route 46 is a 2-lane highway while running parallel within a few miles to limited-access State Route 11 to the east.

== History ==
- 1923 – Original route established; originally routed from Canfield to the former State Route 2 (current U.S. Route 20) in Ashtabula.
- 1931 – Extended to Columbiana along a previously unnumbered road.
- 1938 – Extended to State Route 531 in Ashtabula along a previously unnumbered road.
- 1946 – Extended to East Palestine along its current route and State Route 558.
- 1947 – From 1-mile (1.6 km) south of New Waterford to East Palestine dually certified with State Route 558.
- 1950 – Truncated at 1-mile (1.6 km) south of New Waterford (ODOT’s diagram shows this dual certification is still in place).
- 1956 – Columbiana to Canfield dually certified with State Route 14.
- 1959 – State Route 14 certification removed from Canfield to 2 miles (3.2 km) south of Canfield.
- 1970 – From 1-mile (1.6 km) south of Interstate 90 to Ashtabula rerouted along new freeway alignment and dually certified with State Route 11.
- 1984 – State Route 14 certification removed from Columbiana to 2 miles (3.2 km) south of Canfield.
- 2007-08-17 - Removed from State Route 11, truncated at State Route 11 interchange in Plymouth Township.

== Major intersections ==
County	Location	mi	km	Destinations	Notes
Columbiana	East Palestine	0.00	0.00	SR 170 (Market Street) / SR 558 ends to SR 165 / North Main Street	Southern end of SR 558 concurrency
Columbiana	Unity Township	3.15	5.07	SR 558 west – East Fairfield	Northern end of SR 558 concurrency
Columbiana	Fairfield Township	6.82	10.98	SR 7 south / CR 422 (Columbiana-Waterford Road)	Southern end of SR 7 concurrency
Columbiana	Fairfield Township	8.34	13.42	SR 7 north to Ohio Turnpike / SR 14 east – Youngstown, PA Route 51	Northern end of SR 7 concurrency; southern end of SR 14 concurrency
Columbiana–Mahoning county line	Columbiana	11.08	17.83	SR 164 (South Avenue) – Columbiana, Youngstown	
Columbiana–Mahoning county line	Columbiana	11.15	17.94	SR 14 west (County Line Road) to North Main Street south / SR 164	Northern end of SR 14 concurrency
Mahoning	Beaver Township	13.41– 13.56	21.58– 21.82	SR 11 – Youngstown, East Liverpool	Exit 27 (SR 11)
Mahoning	Beaver Township	14.78	23.79	SR 165 – Greenford, Beloit	
Mahoning	Canfield Township	19.97	32.14	SR 446 north (Canfield Bypass) to US 224 west	Southern terminus of SR 446
Mahoning	Canfield	20.54	33.06	US 62 west (Lisbon Street)	Southern end of US 62 concurrency
Mahoning	Canfield	20.63	33.20	US 224 (Main Street)	
Mahoning	Canfield	21.98	35.37	US 62 east (Shields Road) / Herbert Road	Northern end of US 62 concurrency
Mahoning	Austintown Township	27.45– 27.69	44.18– 44.56	I-80 to I-76 / Ohio Turnpike / Clarkins Drive – New York, Toledo	Exit 223 (I-80)
Trumbull	Niles	31.66	50.95	SR 169 north (North Main Street)	Southern end of SR 169 concurrency
Trumbull	Niles	31.96	51.43	SR 169 east (Robbins Avenue) / Mahoning Avenue	Northern end of SR 169 concurrency
Trumbull	Niles	33.83	54.44	US 422	
Trumbull	Howland Township	35.45– 35.60	57.05– 57.29	SR 82 to SR 11 – Sharon, PA, Warren	Interchange
Trumbull	Cortland	40.99	65.97	SR 305 (Wilson Sharpsville Road) – Champion, Hartford, Mosquito Lake State Park	
Trumbull	Cortland	41.63	67.00	SR 5 west (Elm Road) – Warren	Southern end of SR 5 concurrency
Trumbull	Cortland	41.78	67.24	SR 5 east (High Street) / Warren Meadville Road – Mosquito Lake State Park	Northern end of SR 5 concurrency
Trumbull	Mecca Township	46.68– 46.74	75.12– 75.22	SR 88 (Greenville Road NE) – Johnston, West Farmington	Traffic circle
Trumbull	Greene Township	51.87	83.48	SR 87 (Kinsman Road NE) – Middlefield, Kinsman	
Ashtabula	Colebrook Township	57.07	91.85	US 322 – Orwell	
Ashtabula	New Lyme Township	62.00	99.78	US 6 – Andover, Chardon	
Ashtabula	Jefferson	70.89	114.09	SR 307 east (Mulberry Street)	Southern end of SR 307 concurrency
Ashtabula	Jefferson	70.00	112.65	SR 167 east / SR 307 west (Beech Street)	Western terminus of SR 167; northern end of SR 5 concurrency
Ashtabula	Plymouth Township	76.37– 76.66	122.91– 123.37	SR 11 to I-90 / State Road – Youngstown, Ashtabula	Exit 92 (SR 11)
1.000 mi = 1.609 km; 1.000 km = 0.621 mi: Concurrency terminus
