= Ohio State Route 164 =

State highway in Ohio, US

State Route 164

Route information
- Maintained by ODOT
- Length: 63.57 mi (102.31 km)
- Existed: 1923–present

Major junctions
- South end: SR 212 near Leesville
- US 30 / SR 45 / SR 517 in Lisbon; SR 14 in Columbiana; SR 7 in North Lima
- North end: I-680 near Boardman

Location
- Country: United States
- State: Ohio
- Counties: Mahoning, Columbiana, Carroll, Jefferson

Highway system
- Ohio State Highway System; Interstate; US; State; Scenic
← SR 163	→ SR 165

State Route 164 (SR 164) is a state highway passing through four counties in east-central Ohio. The route runs in a general southwest to northeast fashion, and is signed north–south accordingly. The southern terminus is at an intersection with State Route 212 1-mile (1.6 km) south of Leesville, and the northern terminus is at Interstate 680 and Western Reserve Road on the Beaver and Boardman township boundary between North Lima and Boardman. The southern part of the route serves more rural areas while it makes its way through larger villages and cities toward its northern end.

== History ==
SR 164 was commissioned in 1923, routed from Salineville to Youngstown. The highway was rerouted from North Lima to Youngstown along previous Route 7, in 1926. In 1937 the route was extended south to SR 43 in Amsterdam. The route was extended southeast to the current intersection at SR 212, south of Leesville, in 1938. Between 1977 and 1979 the northern terminus was relocated to the current interchange with I–680.

== Major intersections ==
County	Location	mi	km	Destinations	Notes
Carroll	Leesville	0.00	0.00	SR 212	Southern terminus of SR 164
Carroll	Perry Township	7.27	11.70	SR 332	
Carroll	Loudon Township	13.71	22.06	SR 9 south	Southern end of SR 9 concurrency
Carroll	Loudon Township	13.77	22.16	SR 9 north	Northern end of SR 9 concurrency
Jefferson	Amsterdam	18.84	30.32	SR 43 south	Southern end of SR 43 concurrency
Jefferson	Amsterdam	18.96	30.51	SR 43 north	Northern end of SR 43 concurrency
Jefferson	Bergholz	24.02	38.66	SR 524 north	Southern terminus of SR 524
Columbiana	Salineville	31.93	51.39	SR 39 west	Southern end of SR 39 concurrency
Columbiana	Washington Township	34.46	55.46	SR 39 east	Northern end of SR 39 concurrency
Columbiana	Wayne Township	39.38	63.38	SR 518 west	Western end of SR 518 concurrency
Columbiana	Wayne Township	39.79	64.04	SR 518 east	Eastern end of SR 518 concurrency
Columbiana	Lisbon	44.90	72.26	US 30 / SR 45 south / SR 154 east / SR 517 begins	Southern end of SR 45 concurrency; western terminus of SR 154; Southern terminus of SR 517; southern end of SR 517 concurrency
Columbiana	Lisbon	45.25	72.82	SR 45 north	Northern end of SR 45 concurrency
Columbiana	Lisbon	45.63	73.43	SR 517 east	Northern end of SR 517 concurrency
Columbiana	Fairfield Township	50.29	80.93	SR 558	
Columbiana	Fairfield Township	53.21	85.63	SR 344 west	western end of SR 344 concurrency
Columbiana	Columbiana	54.98	88.48	SR 344 end	Eastern end of SR 344 concurrency; eastern terminus of SR 344
Columbiana–Mahoning county line	Columbiana	55.78	89.77	SR 14 / SR 46	
Mahoning	North Lima	59.37	95.55	SR 165	
Mahoning	North Lima	59.75	96.16	SR 7	
Mahoning	Beaver Township	60.77	97.80	SR 626 south	Southern end of SR 626 concurrency
Mahoning	Beaver Township	60.89	97.99	SR 626 north	Northern end of SR 626 concurrency
Mahoning	Beaver Township	63.57	102.31	I-680	Northern terminus of SR 164
1.000 mi = 1.609 km; 1.000 km = 0.621 mi: Concurrency terminus
