= Ohio State Route 625 =

State highway in Mahoning County, Ohio, US

State Route 625

Route information
- Maintained by ODOT
- Length: 3.36 mi (5.41 km)
- Existed: 1937–present

Major junctions
- South end: US 224 in Boardman
- North end: US 62 in Youngstown

Location
- Country: United States
- State: Ohio
- Counties: Mahoning

Highway system
- Ohio State Highway System; Interstate; US; State; Scenic
← SR 623	→ SR 626

State Route 625 (SR 625) is a state route in northeastern Ohio that exists entirely within Mahoning County. The southern terminus of SR 625 is at U.S. Route 224 (US 224) near Boardman, and its northern terminus is at US 62 in the southwestern portion of Youngstown. SR 625 is currently signed north–south, but in the past was signed east–west.

Until July 2008, SR 625 continued east via US 62, Glenwood Avenue, and Midlothian Boulevard, across Interstate 680 (I-680) and concurrent with SR 170 for a short distance before coming to an end where SR 170 turns off from Midlothian Boulevard onto Youngstown-Poland Road. In 2008, SR 625 was truncated to its current endpoint, and the portions of SR 625 along Glenwood Avenue and Midlothian Boulevard west of I-680 became an extension of SR 170.

== Route description ==
SR 625 begins at the signalized intersection of US 224 and Tippecanoe Road in Boardman Township. Known as Lockwood Boulevard, SR 625 begins in a northeasterly direction, passing through a commercial district up through its intersection with Tippecanoe Road, which turns off to the northwest. From here, the west side of SR 625 is primarily residential, while the east side of the highway abuts the western boundary of Mill Creek Park. Eventually, a residential cul-du-sac, an apartment complex, and then the Mill Creek Park Golf Course appear on the east side of SR 625. Beyond there, the highway arrives at a signalized intersection with Shields Road. Continuing to the northeast, SR 625 passes by a number of homes and scattered patches of woods, before intersecting Truesdale Road. The primarily residential state route continues to the northeast through the point where the highway departs Lockwood Boulevard, and turns north onto Arden Boulevard. SR 625 intersects Midlothian Boulevard, at which point it enters into Youngstown. With houses lining both sides of the route, SR 625 continues north for a short distance, curving slightly to the north-northwest as it enters into the signalized T-intersection with US 62 that marks its endpoint.

== History ==
SR 625 came into being in 1937 along the routing between US 224 and US 62 routing that it currently occupies. In 1960, SR 625 was extended along US 62, Glenwood Avenue, and Midlothian Boulevard to a new eastern terminus at the point where today, SR 170 turns from Midlothian Boulevard onto Youngstown-Poland Road. By 2008, SR 625 was truncated back to its original alignment, and the former stretch of SR 625 along Glenwood Avenue and Midlothian Boulevard became an extension of SR 170. Signs were changed July 16 and 17, 2008.

== Major intersections ==
The entire route is in Mahoning County.

Location	mi	km	Destinations	Notes
Boardman Township	0.00	0.00	US 224 (Boardman-Canfield Road) / Tippecanoe Road – Poland, Canfield	
Youngstown	3.36	5.41	US 62 (Canfield Road)	
1.000 mi = 1.609 km; 1.000 km = 0.621 mi
