= Ohio State Route 170 =

State highway in northeastern Ohio, US

State Route 170

Route information
- Maintained by ODOT
- Length: 36.64 mi (58.97 km)
- Existed: 1924–present

Major junctions
- South end: US 30 / SR 7 / SR 11 near Calcutta
- US 224 in Poland; I-680 in Youngstown; SR 7 in Youngstown
- North end: US 62 in Youngstown

Location
- Country: United States
- State: Ohio
- Counties: Columbiana, Mahoning

Highway system
- Ohio State Highway System; Interstate; US; State; Scenic
← SR 169	→ SR 171

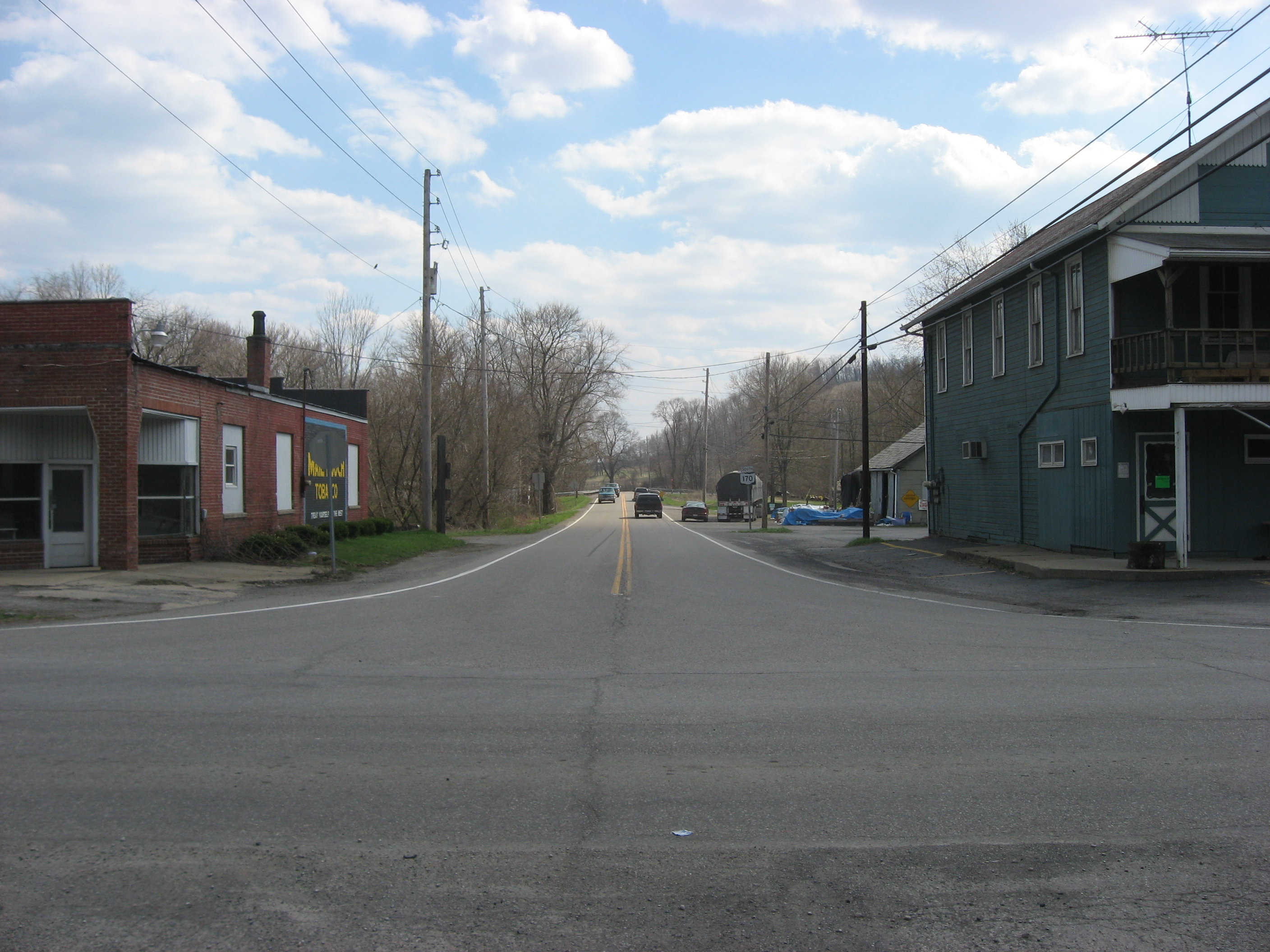
Intersection with State Route 154 in Negley

State Route 170 (SR 170) is a north–south running state route located in Mahoning and Columbiana counties in northeast Ohio. It runs within a few miles of the Pennsylvania border for much of its route as it passes through the eastern parts of the two counties. The southern terminus is at an interchange with U.S. 30, State Route 7, and State Route 11 near Calcutta, and the northern at U.S. 62 in Youngstown. ODOT extended the northern terminus from the previous point of Interstate 680, changing signs on July 16 and 17, 2008.

== History ==
In 1924, it became the original state highway where it routed from East Palestine to Petersburg. In 1931 the highway extended to East Liverpool along a previously unnumbered road. Later in 1962 it was extended to 1-mile (1.6 km) north of North Kingsville along previous route 90. The road was truncated at 3 miles (4.8 km) north of Poland in 1970. In 2008, it extended 3 miles (4.8 km) to U.S. 62 in Youngstown along the former Route 625.

== Major junctions ==
County	Location	mi	km	Destinations	Notes
Columbiana	Calcutta	0.00	0.00	US 30 / SR 7 / SR 11 / Substation Road	Interchange
Columbiana	Negley	11.18	17.99	SR 154 east – Beaver Falls, PA	Southern end of SR 154 concurrency
Columbiana	Negley	11.24	18.09	SR 154 west – Lisbon	Northern end of SR 154 concurrency
Columbiana	East Palestine	14.57	23.45	SR 46 north / SR 558 west (Main Street)	Southern terminus of SR 46; eastern terminus of SR 558
Columbiana	East Palestine	14.82	23.85	SR 165 east (Taggart Street)	Southern end of SR 165 concurrency
Columbiana	Unity Township	16.70	26.88	SR 14 east / North Market Street	Southern end of SR 14 concurrency
Columbiana	Unity Township	17.24	27.75	SR 14 west / SR 165 west / Brookdale Avenue – Columbiana	Northern end of SR 14 / SR 165 concurrency
Mahoning	Petersburg	21.23	34.17	SR 617 west (Garfield Road)	Southern end of SR 617 concurrency
Mahoning	Petersburg	21.32	34.31	SR 617 east (Youngstown-Pittsburgh Road) / CR 8 (East Garfield Road)	Northern end of SR 617 concurrency
Mahoning	New Middletown	26.04	41.91	SR 630 east / CR 30 (East Calla Road)	Western terminus of SR 630
Mahoning	Poland	30.33	48.81	SR 616 north (Water Street)	Southern terminus of SR 616
Mahoning	Poland	30.39	48.91	US 224 (Center Road)	
Mahoning	Youngstown	33.55	53.99	I-680 – Youngstown, Pittsburgh	Exit 9 (I-680)
Mahoning	Youngstown	35.33	56.86	SR 7 (Market Street)	
Mahoning	Youngstown	36.64	58.97	US 62 (Canfield Road / Glenwood Avenue)	
1.000 mi = 1.609 km; 1.000 km = 0.621 mi: Concurrency terminus
