= Ohio State Route 183 =

State highway in eastern Ohio, US

State Route 183

Route information
- Maintained by ODOT
- Length: 43.38 mi (69.81 km)
- Existed: 1962–present

Major junctions
- South end: SR 800 / CR 108 near Magnolia
- SR 43 near Waynesburg; US 30 in Minerva; US 62 / SR 173 in Alliance; US 224 / CR 87 in Atwater
- North end: SR 14 / CR 52 in Edinburg

Location
- Country: United States
- State: Ohio
- Counties: Tuscarawas, Carroll, Stark, Portage

Highway system
- Ohio State Highway System; Interstate; US; State; Scenic
← SR 182	→ SR 184
← I-80	→ SR 81

State Route 183 (SR 183) is a north/south state Highway in eastern Ohio. Its southern terminus is SR 800 in Sandy Township, approximately 0.5 miles (0.80 km) east of Sandyville and less than two miles (3.2 km) south of East Sparta. Its northern terminus is SR 14 in Edinburg Township near Interstate 76, about 10 miles (16 km) southeast of Ravenna. The current route was commissioned in 1962.

== History ==
At the 1923 Ohio state highway renumbering, a previous State Route 183 was established in Lucas County in an area that was later annexed by the city of Toledo. Its southern terminus was at U.S. 24 (South Detroit Avenue) and followed Byrne Road for its entire length, a short section of Dorr Street, Secor Road from Dorr Street to Whiteford Center Road, and Whiteford Center Road from Secor Road to the Ohio–Michigan border, which served as the route's northern terminus. This route was decommissioned in 1951.

Most of modern State Route 183 was part of a larger State Route 80 established in 1923, with a southern terminus at the modern southern end of SR 183 in Sandy Township at what was then State Route 8 and a northern terminus at the original State Route 16 in Welshfield, which became U.S. Route 422 by 1927. It was extended north in 1939 from Welshfield to State Route 87 in Burton. As part of the creation of the Ravenna Army Ammunition Plant, the section of SR 80 between State Route 88 in Freedom and State Route 14 in Edinburg was decommissioned in 1941 with the section from Freedom north redesignated as State Route 700 in 1942.

The current alignment of SR 183 was done in two parts. In 1937 the portion of the road between Alliance and U.S. 224 was made part of State Route 225 and the portion of SR 80 between Alliance and Atwater was rerouted further west, following State Route 619 west from Alliance and then turning north on Atwater Avenue NE, passing through Limaville and continuing to the junction with U.S. 224 in Atwater Center. In 1948, the portion between Limaville and Alliance was rerouted along the current SR 183 alignment using Iowa Avenue NE heading northeast from Alliance, passing through the western edge of Limaville. The short 0.5-mile (0.80 km) cosign with U.S. 224 in Atwater was added in 1958 as part of a realignment of U.S. 224 between Atwater and Akron that constructed a separate highway to parallel Waterloo Road. The route was designated as State Route 183 in 1962, as part of the state's redesignation of highways with the same route number as the new interstate highways in Ohio. SR 80 signage was removed by June 1963.

== Major intersections ==
County	Location	mi	km	Destinations	Notes
Tuscarawas	Sandy Township	0.00	0.00	SR 800 / CR 108 (Cross Roads Road) – Dover, Canton, Sandyville	
Carroll	Magnolia	3.22	5.18	SR 542 south (Main Street) / Carrollton Street – Dellroy	Northern terminus of SR 542
Stark	Waynesburg	6.13	9.87	SR 171 east (Lisbon Street) / Main Street – Carrollton	Western terminus of SR 171
Stark	Sandy Township	6.79	10.93	SR 43 north – Canton	Southern end of SR 43 concurrency
Carroll	Brown Township	12.21	19.65	SR 43 south (Canton Road) – Carrollton	Northern end of SR 43 concurrency
Stark	Minerva	16.58	26.68	US 30 west (Lincoln Way) / Market Street	Southern end of US 30 concurrency
Stark	Minerva	17.61	28.34	US 30 east (Lincoln Highway)	Northern end of US 30 concurrency
Stark	Paris Township	21.93	35.29	SR 172 – [[, Ohio|]], [[, Ohio|]]	
Stark	Washington Township	24.47	39.38	SR 153 west (Louisville Street) / CR 106 – Louisville, Homeworth	Eastern terminus of SR 153
Stark	Alliance	29.21	47.01	US 62 / SR 173 (State Street)	
Stark	Alliance	31.12	50.08	SR 225 north (Union Avenue)	Southern terminus of SR 225
Stark	Lexington Township	31.92	51.37	SR 619 west – Hartville	Eastern terminus of SR 619
Portage	Atwater Township	38.25	61.56	US 224 east / CR 87 (Waterloo Road) – Canfield	Southern end of US 224 concurrency
Portage	Atwater Township	38.77	62.39	US 224 west – Barberton	Northern end of US 224 concurrency
Portage	Edinburg Township	43.38	69.81	SR 14 / CR 52 (Rock Spring Road) – Ravenna, West Branch State Park	
1.000 mi = 1.609 km; 1.000 km = 0.621 mi: Concurrency terminus
