= Ohio State Route 9 =

North-south state highway in Ohio, US

State Route 9
- Route of SR 9 highlighted in red

Route information
- Maintained by ODOT
- Length: 92.51 mi (148.88 km)
- Existed: 1935–present

Major junctions
- South end: SR 148 in Armstrongs Mills
- I-70 near St. Clairsville; US 40 in St. Clairsville; US 22 / US 250 near Cadiz; SR 39 / SR 43 / SR 332 in Carrollton; US 30 / SR 644 near Kensington
- North end: US 62 near Salem

Location
- Country: United States
- State: Ohio
- Counties: Belmont, Harrison, Carroll, Columbiana

Highway system
- Ohio State Highway System; Interstate; US; State; Scenic
← SR 8	→ SR 10
← US 35	→ US 36

State Route 9 (SR 9) is a north–south route running through four counties in east central Ohio. Its route is 92.5 miles (148.9 km) long. The southern terminus is at SR 148 in Armstrongs Mills and the northern terminus is with US 62 north of Salem.

== Route description ==
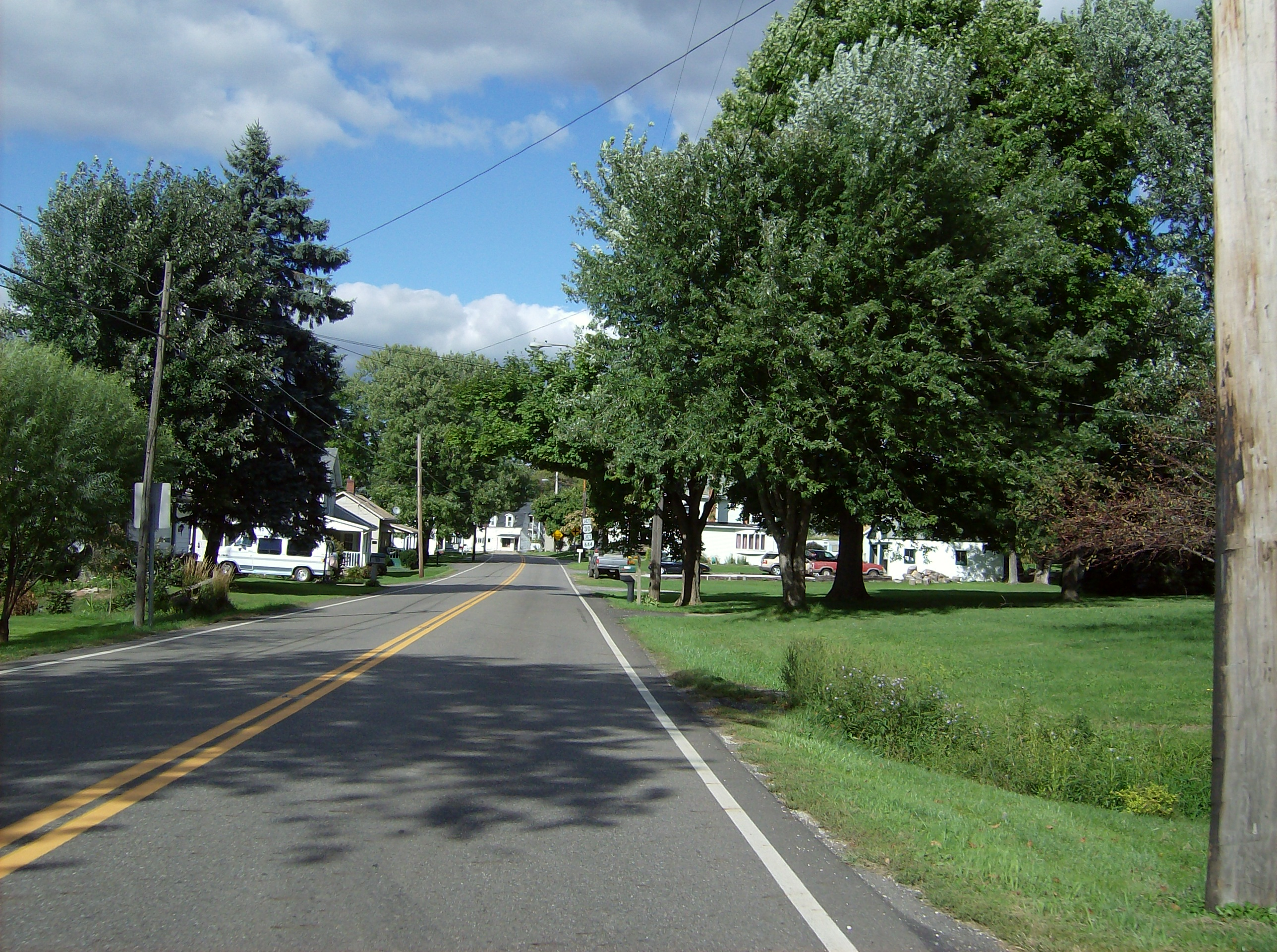
Northbound along State Route 9, approaching U.S. Route 30 in Kensington

== History ==
Before 1931, Route 9 ran from Cincinnati to Michigan. The highway followed the current U.S. Highway 127 from the Ohio River at Cincinnati to just south of Bryan and followed the current Ohio State Route 15 northward to the Michigan state line.

In 1935, a new incarnation of Route 9 was certified, originally routed from Malaga to Salem along current Routes 145, 148, and 9.

In 1938, the southern end was truncated to Armstrongs Mills, and in 1974, the northern end was extended through Salem to 2 miles (3.2 km) north of Salem.

== Major intersections ==
County	Location	mi	km	Destinations	Notes
Belmont	Washington Township	0.00	0.00	SR 148 (Captina Road)	Southern terminus
Belmont	Smith Township	5.94	9.56	SR 147 (Main Street)	Southern end of SR 147 concurrency
Belmont	Smith Township	6.71	10.80	SR 147 (Belmont–Centerville Road)	Northern end of SR 147 concurrency
Belmont	Smith Township	10.38	16.70	SR 149 (Belmont–Warnock Road)	Southern end of SR 149 concurrency
Belmont	Smith Township	10.51	16.91	SR 149 (Warnock–Glencoe Road)	Northern end of SR 149 concurrency
Belmont	Richland Township	14.53– 14.58	23.38– 23.46	I-70	Diamond interchange; exit 216 on I-70
Belmont	St. Clairsville	15.39	24.77	US 40 (Main Street)	
Harrison	Athens Township	24.70	39.75	SR 149 (Flushing–New Athens Road)	Northern terminus of SR 149
Harrison	New Athens	25.24	40.62	SR 519	
Harrison	Cadiz	31.90	51.34	US 250	Southern end of US 250 concurrency
Harrison	Cadiz	32.72– 32.90	52.66– 52.95	US 22 (Cadiz–Steubenville Road) / US 250	Northern end of US 250 concurrency; Partial cloverleaf interchange
Harrison	Rumley Township	39.94	64.28	SR 151 (Jewett–Scio Road)	Southern end of SR 151 concurrency
Harrison	Jewett	41.77	67.22	SR 151 (Main Street)	Northern end of SR 151 concurrency
Harrison	German Township	46.07	74.14	SR 646 (Annapolis Road)	Southern end of SR 646 concurrency
Harrison	German Township	46.66	75.09	SR 646 (Rumley East Road)	Northern end of SR 646 concurrency
Carroll	Loudon Township	51.13	82.29	SR 164 (Amsterdam Road)	Southern end of SR 164 concurrency
Carroll	Loudon Township	51.19	82.38	SR 164 (Amsterdam Road)	Northern end of SR 164 concurrency
Carroll	Lee Township	56.40	90.77	SR 43 (Steubenville Road)	Southern end of SR 43 concurrency
Carroll	Center Township	61.28	98.62	SR 39 (Salineville Road)	Southern end of SR 39 concurrency
Carroll	Carrollton	61.79	99.44	SR 39 / SR 43 / SR 332	Northern end of SR 39/43 concurrences; Northern terminus of SR 332
Carroll	Washington Township	65.47	105.36	SR 171 (Waynesburg Road)	
Columbiana	Hanover Township	76.76	123.53	US 30 / SR 644	Southern end of US 30 concurrency; Northern terminus of SR 644
Columbiana	Hanoverton	78.30	126.01	US 30	Northern end of US 30 concurrency
Columbiana	Hanover Township	81.51	131.18	SR 172	
Columbiana	Perry Township	88.81	142.93	SR 45	
Columbiana	Salem	90.47	145.60	SR 14 / SR 173	Southern end of SR 14 concurrency
Columbiana	Salem	90.73	146.02	SR 14 / SR 344	Northern end of SR 14 concurrency
Columbiana	Salem	92.51	148.88	US 62	Northern terminus at a T-intersection
1.000 mi = 1.609 km; 1.000 km = 0.621 mi: Concurrency terminus
