= Amsterdam, Ohio =

- Village
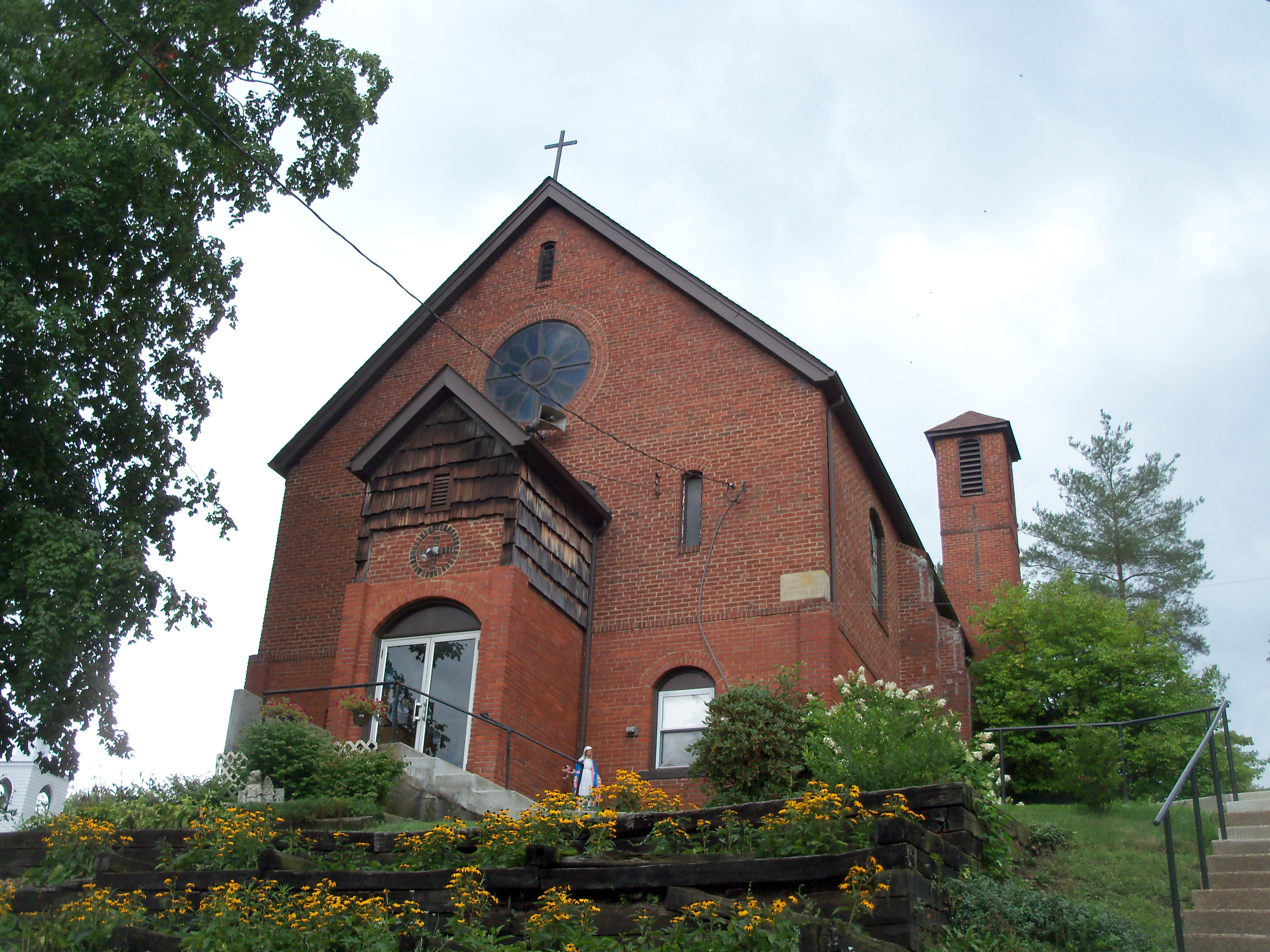
- Saint Joseph Catholic Church on Route 164

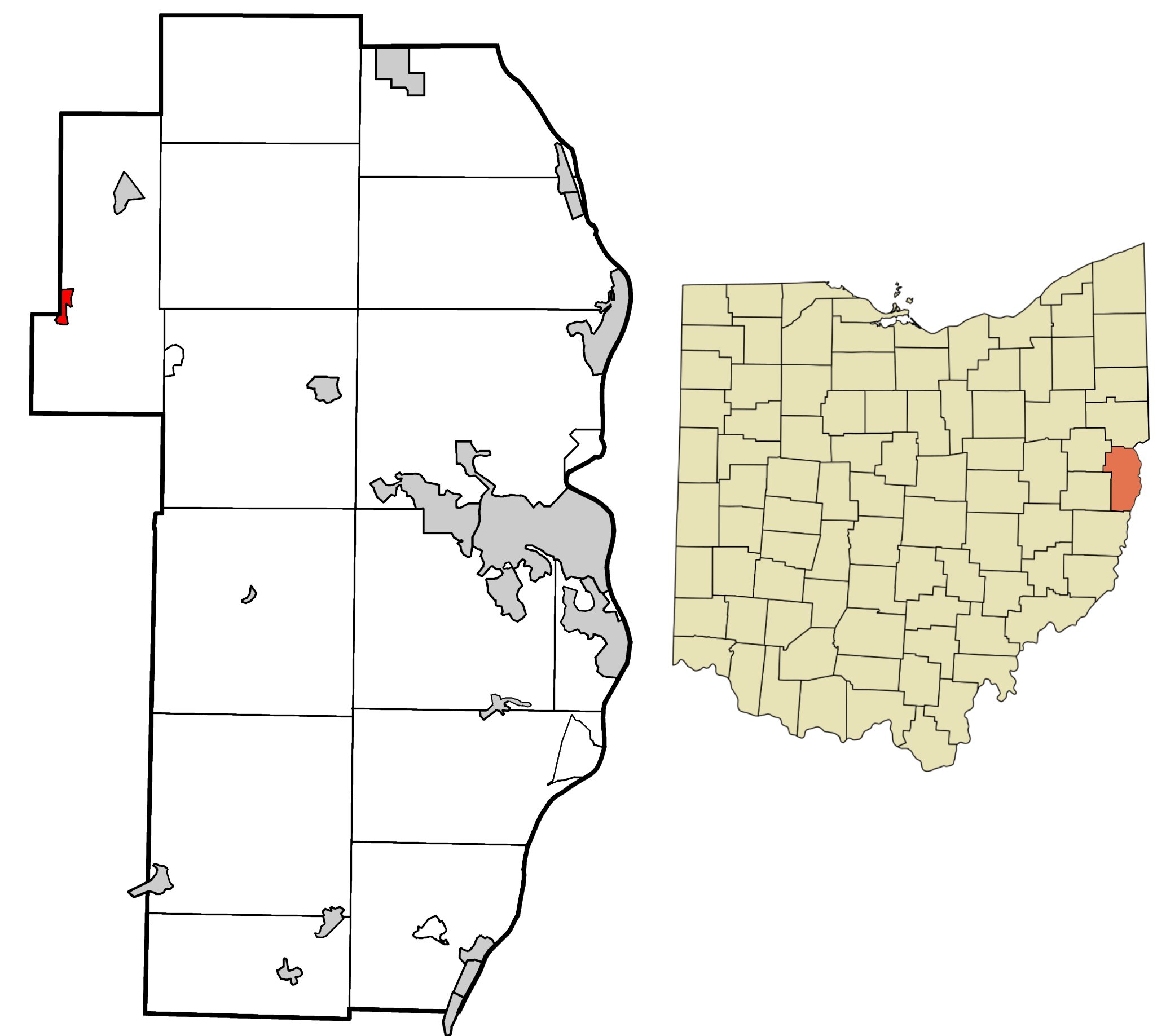
- Location of Amsterdam in Jefferson County, Ohio

- Location within Ohio Location within the United States
- Coordinates: 40°28′18″N 80°55′18″W
- Country: United States
- State: Ohio
- County: Jefferson
- Township: Springfield

Area
  - Total: 0.32 sq mi (0.83 km^{2})
  - Land: 0.32 sq mi (0.83 km^{2})
  - Water: 0 sq mi (0.00 km^{2})
- Elevation: 978 ft (298 m)

Population (2020)
  - Total: 436
  - Estimate (2023): 426
  - Density: 1,363.8/sq mi (526.55/km^{2})
- Time zone: UTC-5 (Eastern (EST))
  - Summer (DST): UTC-4 (EDT)
- ZIP code: 43903
- Area code: 740
- FIPS code: 39-01938
- GNIS feature ID: 2397958

Amsterdam is a village in Jefferson County, Ohio, United States. The population was 436 at the 2020 census. It is part of the Weirton–Steubenville metropolitan area.

== History ==
Amsterdam was laid out in 1828. The community was founded by Dutch immigrant David Johnson and named after the city of Amsterdam, the Netherlands. A post office called Amsterdam has been in operation since 1832. Amsterdam was designed a Tree City USA by the National Arbor Day Foundation in 1997.

== Geography ==
According to the United States Census Bureau, the village has a total area of 0.32 square miles (0.83 km^{2}), all land.

== Demographics ==
Historical population
Census	Pop.	Note	%±
1850	168		—
1870	89		—
1880	106		19.1%
1910	1,041		—
1920	1,271		22.1%
1930	1,171		−7.9%
1940	1,177		0.5%
1950	1,048		−11.0%
1960	931		−11.2%
1970	882		−5.3%
1980	783		−11.2%
1990	669		−14.6%
2000	568		−15.1%
2010	511		−10.0%
2020	436		−14.7%
2023 (est.)	426	▼	−2.3%
U.S. Decennial Census

=== 2010 census ===
As of the census of 2010, there were 511 people, 204 households, and 133 families living in the village. The population density was 1,596.9 inhabitants per square mile (616.6/km^{2}). There were 235 housing units at an average density of 734.4 per square mile (283.6/km^{2}). The racial makeup of the village was 99.0% White, 0.2% Native American, 0.2% Asian, and 0.6% from two or more races. Hispanic or Latino of any race were 1.0% of the population.

There were 204 households, of which 33.3% had children under the age of 18 living with them, 48.5% were married couples living together, 11.8% had a female householder with no husband present, 4.9% had a male householder with no wife present, and 34.8% were non-families. 30.4% of all households were made up of individuals, and 14.8% had someone living alone who was 65 years of age or older. The average household size was 2.50 and the average family size was 3.12.

The median age in the village was 39.6 years. 25% of residents were under the age of 18; 6.5% were between the ages of 18 and 24; 26.9% were from 25 to 44; 25.3% were from 45 to 64; and 16.2% were 65 years of age or older. The gender makeup of the village was 46.4% male and 53.6% female.

=== 2000 census ===
As of the census of 2000, there were 568 people, 231 households, and 155 families living in the village. The population density was 1,805.5 inhabitants per square mile (697.1/km^{2}). There were 251 housing units at an average density of 797.8 per square mile (308.0/km^{2}). The racial makeup of the village was 98.59% White, 0.18% African American and 1.23% Native American. Hispanic or Latino of any race were 0.35% of the population.

There were 231 households, out of which 31.6% had children under the age of 18 living with them, 49.4% were married couples living together, 11.7% had a female householder with no husband present, and 32.9% were non-families. 29.4% of all households were made up of individuals, and 17.3% had someone living alone who was 65 years of age or older. The average household size was 2.46 and the average family size was 3.01.

In the village, the population was spread out, with 27.1% under the age of 18, 6.0% from 18 to 24, 29.8% from 25 to 44, 18.5% from 45 to 64, and 18.7% who were 65 years of age or older. The median age was 36 years. For every 100 females there were 93.2 males. For every 100 females age 18 and over, there were 92.6 males.

The median income for a household in the village was $24,583, and the median income for a family was $29,107. Males had a median income of $28,125 versus $14,750 for females. The per capita income for the village was $11,225. About 18.5% of families and 23.7% of the population were below the poverty line, including 38.6% of those under age 18 and 8.1% of those age 65 or over.

== Education ==
Public education in the village of Amsterdam is provided by the Edison Local School District. Campuses serving the village include John Gregg Elementary School (Preschool-Grade 6), and Edison High School (Grades 7-12).
