= North Lima, Ohio =

- Census-designated place
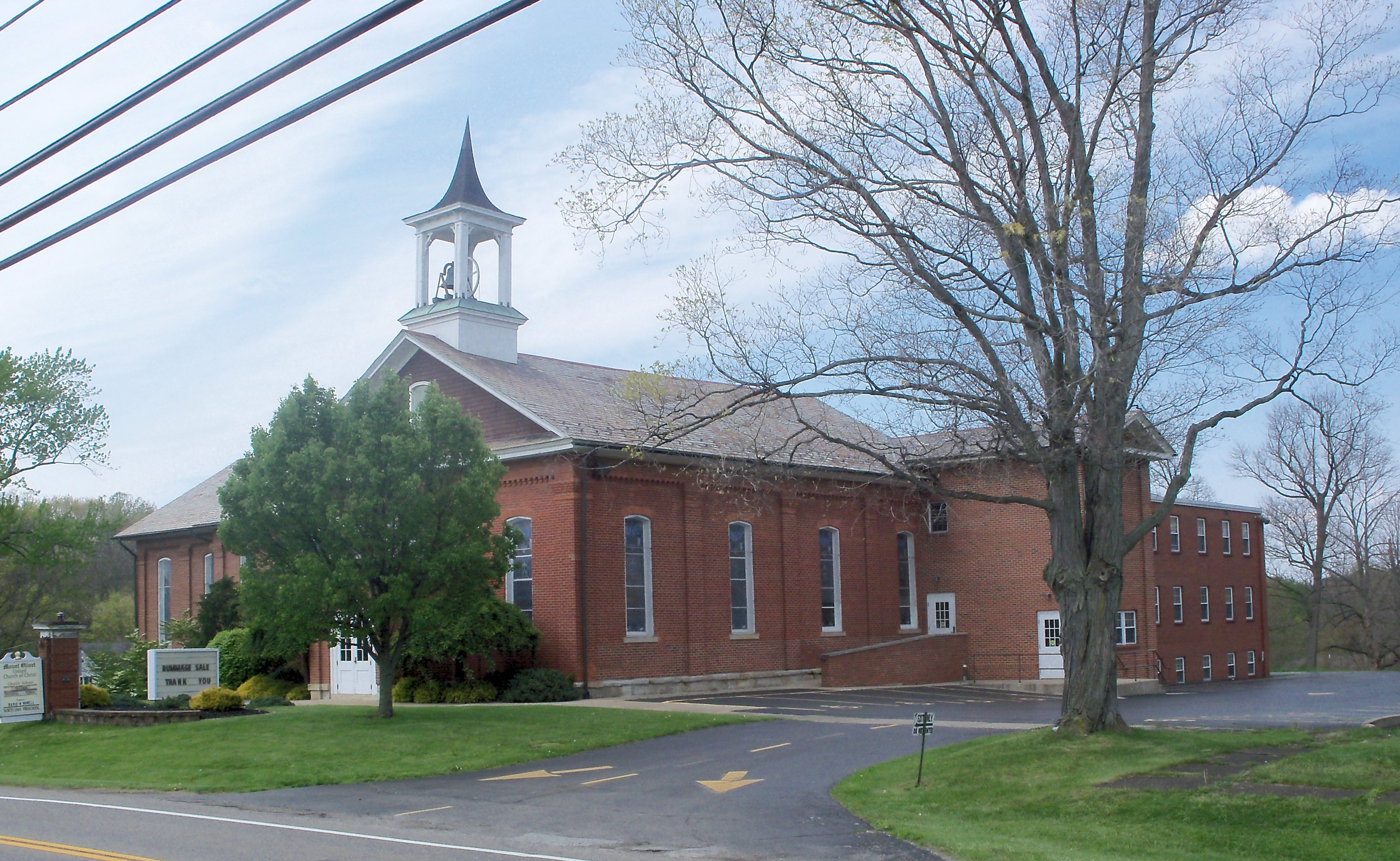
- Mount Olivet United Church of Christ

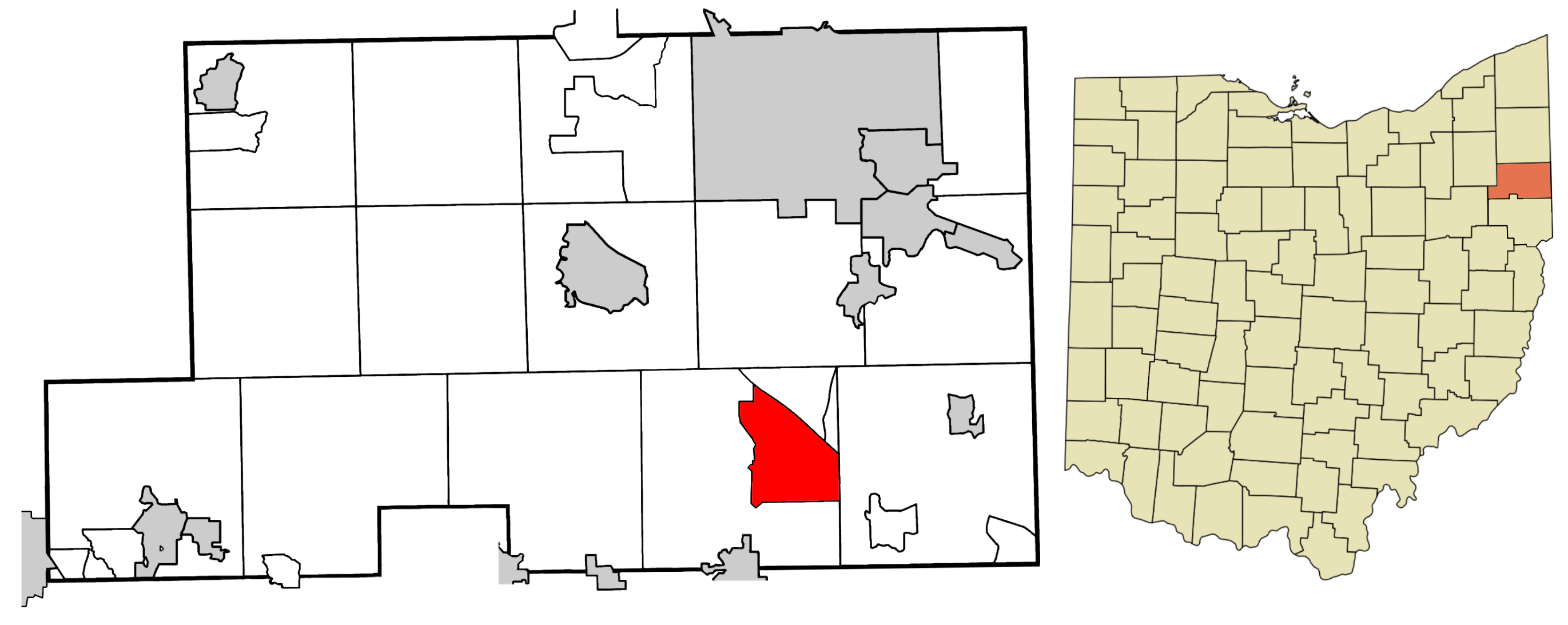
- Location of North Lima in Mahoning County, Ohio.

- Location within Ohio Location within the United States
- Coordinates: 40°56′59″N 80°39′40″W
- Country: United States
- State: Ohio
- County: Mahoning
- Township: Beaver

Area
  - Total: 7.07 sq mi (18.30 km^{2})
  - Land: 6.86 sq mi (17.76 km^{2})
  - Water: 0.21 sq mi (0.54 km^{2})
- Elevation: 1,096 ft (334 m)

Population (2020)
  - Total: 1,369
  - Density: 199.7/sq mi (77.09/km^{2})
- Time zone: UTC-5 (Eastern (EST))
  - Summer (DST): UTC-4 (EDT)
- ZIP code: 44452
- Area codes: 330, 234
- FIPS code: 39-56798
- GNIS feature ID: 2812831
- School District: South Range Local School District

North Lima is an unincorporated community and census-designated place in Beaver Township, Mahoning County, Ohio, United States. The population was 1,369 at the 2020 census. Located at the intersection of State Routes 7, 164, and 165, it is part of the Youngstown–Warren metropolitan area.

== History ==
North Lima was laid out around 1826. The name may be a transfer from Lima, New York. A post office called North Lima has been in operation since 1832 which bears the ZIP code of 44452.

The former site of South Range High School is located in the town center. The building is now used to host many of the town's local businesses.

== Demographics ==
Historical population
Census	Pop.	Note	%±
2020	1,369		—
U.S. Decennial Census

== Education ==
Children in North Lima are served by the public South Range Local School District, which includes one elementary school, one middle school, and South Range High School.

== Notable people ==
- Charlotte Benkner, one of the oldest living persons on record, spent the last few years of her life in North Lima
- Bob Mortimer, Christian evangelist
- Samuel J. Steiner, draft resister and Mennonite historian
- Frank DiLeo, Michael Jackson manager. Died in a care facility outside Youngstown, Ohio.
