= Ohio State Route 225 =

State highway in northeastern Ohio, US

State Route 225

Route information
- Maintained by ODOT
- Length: 20.02 mi (32.22 km)
- Existed: 1924–present

Major junctions
- South end: SR 183 in Alliance
- US 224 near Limaville; I-76 in Palmyra Township
- North end: SR 5 in Paris Township

Location
- Country: United States
- State: Ohio
- Counties: Portage, Stark

Highway system
- Ohio State Highway System; Interstate; US; State; Scenic
← SR 224	→ SR 226

State Route 225 (SR 225) is a north–south state highway in northeastern Ohio. It stretches for just over 20 miles (32 km) from its southern terminus in northern Alliance where it meets State Route 183 to its northern terminus at State Route 5 opposite the Ravenna Training and Logistics Site in Paris Township. It passes through the mostly rural areas of northern Stark County and southeastern Portage County. The road is two lanes almost the entire length, except for the portion at the partial interchange with the future U.S. Route 62 just north of the Alliance city limits. State Route 225 is co-signed with U.S. Route 224 from the western border of Deerfield Township east to the Deerfield Circle and with State Route 14 for a short distance as it turns north from the circle. It crosses Interstate 76 at exit 48 in Palmyra Township just north of its intersection with Tallmadge Road (County Road 18), formerly designated as State Route 18.

== History ==
State Route 225 was first designated in 1924, though initially it ran along part of what is now Alliance Road in Portage County, extending from the current U.S. Route 224 to the south and ending at State Route 14 in the small town of Yale to the north.

In 1931, State Route 225 was routed along what is now the northern section of State Route 183 from Atwater Center north to Edinburg. By 1937, it was again rerouted and extended, returning to its original location to Yale, but this time going 3 miles (4.8 km) further north to State Route 18, and extending south to Alliance along its current alignment south of U.S. Route 224. As part of the construction of the new Interstate 80S, part of SR 18 was rerouted onto the new freeway by 1966, leaving the northern terminus of SR 225 at the former SR 18 (Tallmadge Road). By 1969, the northern terminus of SR 225 was moved back to SR 14 in Yale as the section of SR 225 between Yale and SR 18 was decommissioned. In 1970, State Route 225 was rerouted once again to its current alignment, turning east along U.S. Route 224 to Deerfield Center and then turning north at State Route 14 along what had previously been designated State Route 627.

== Major intersections ==
County	Location	mi	km	Destinations	Notes
Stark	Alliance	0.00	0.00	SR 183 (Diehl Street / North Union Street)	
Stark	Lexington Township	0.53	0.85	Temp. US 62 west – Canton	Eastern terminus of unsigned US 62T
Portage	Atwater–Deerfield township line	6.78	10.91	US 224 west (Waterloo Road)	Southern end of US 224 concurrency
Portage	Deerfield Township	9.39	15.11	US 224 east / SR 14 south (Cleveland-East Liverpool Road) – Salem, Canfield	Northern end of US 224 concurrency, southern end of SR 14 concurrency; Deerfield Circle
Portage	Deerfield Township	9.48	15.26	SR 14 north (Cleveland-East Liverpool Road)	Northern end of SR 14 concurrency
Portage	Palmyra Township	14.98	24.11	I-76 – Akron, Youngstown	Exit 48 (I-76)
Portage	Paris Township	20.02	32.22	SR 5 (Ravenna-Warren Road)	
1.000 mi = 1.609 km; 1.000 km = 0.621 mi: Concurrency terminus
