= Bazetta Township, Ohio =

Township in Ohio, US

Bazetta Township, Trumbull County, Ohio
- Township
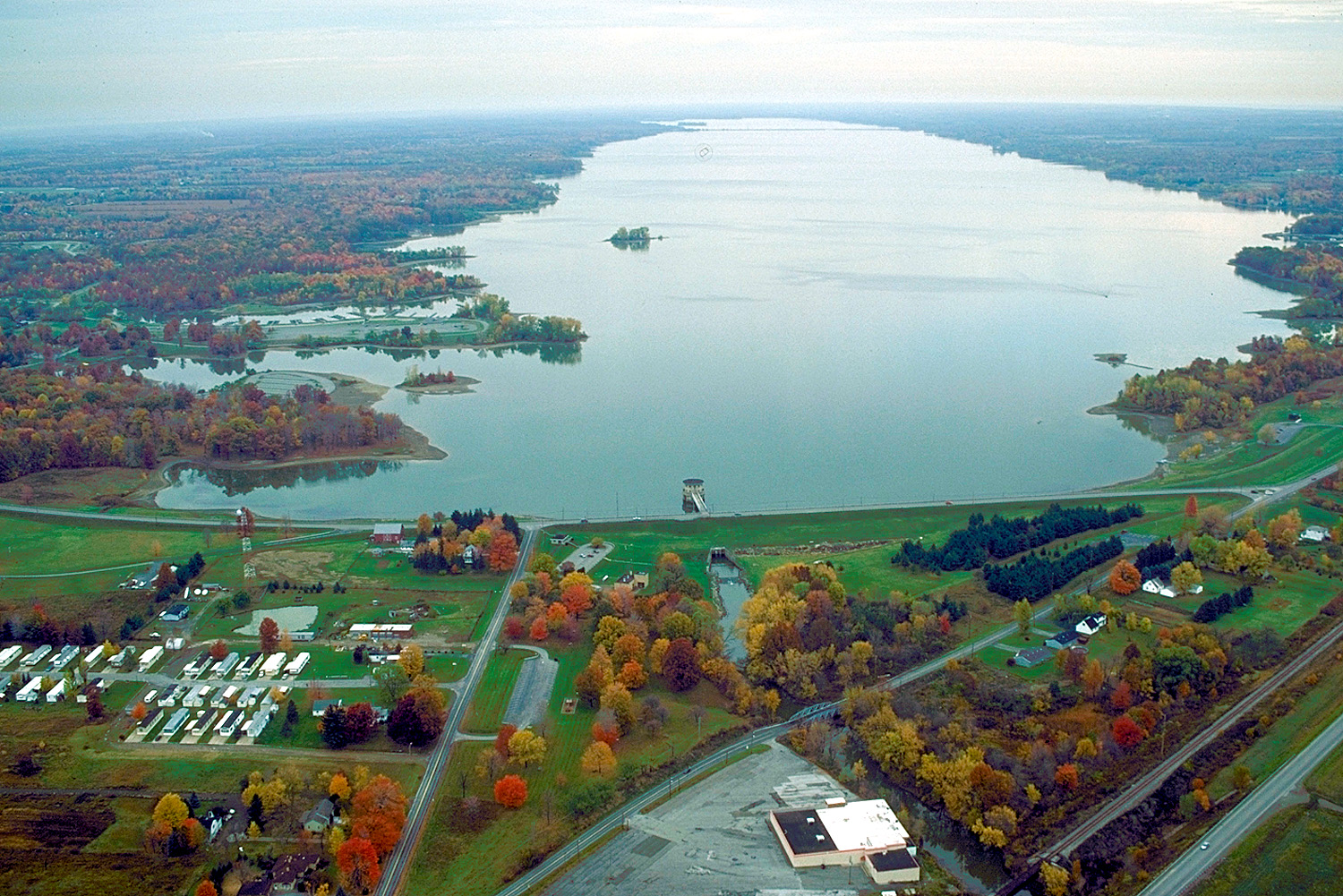
- Southern end of Mosquito Creek Lake

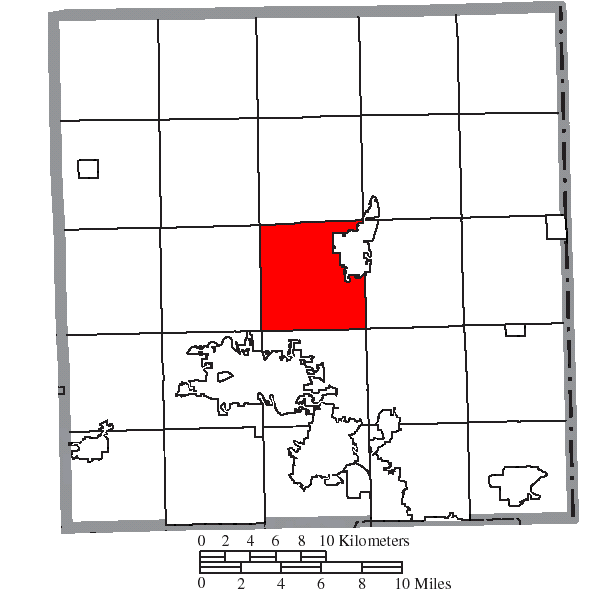
- Location of Bazetta Township in Trumbull County
- Coordinates: 41°18′16″N 80°45′3″W
- Country: United States
- State: Ohio
- County: Trumbull

Area
  - Total: 24.5 sq mi (63.4 km^{2})
  - Land: 21.0 sq mi (54.4 km^{2})
  - Water: 3.4 sq mi (8.9 km^{2})
- Elevation: 955 ft (291 m)

Population (2020)
  - Total: 5,912
  - Density: 242/sq mi (93.6/km^{2})
- Time zone: UTC-5 (Eastern (EST))
  - Summer (DST): UTC-4 (EDT)
- ZIP code: 44410 44481
- Area codes: 234/330
- FIPS code: 39-04444
- GNIS feature ID: 1087022

Bazetta Township is one of the twenty-four townships of Trumbull County, Ohio, United States. The 2020 census found 5,912 people in the township.

== Geography ==
Located at the center of the county, it borders the following townships:

- Mecca Township - north
- Johnston Township - northeast corner
- Fowler Township - east
- Vienna Township - southeast corner
- Howland Township - south
- Warren Township - southwest corner
- Champion Township - west
- Bristol Township - northwest corner

Most of the city of Cortland is located in northeastern Bazetta Township.

A significant portion of the township is covered by Mosquito Creek Lake, around which areas of land are allocated to the Mosquito Lake State Park in the southern portion of the lake and to the Mosquito Creek Wildlife Area in the northern portion.

== Name and history ==
The etymology of the name Bazetta is uncertain. It is the only Bazetta Township statewide.

In 1795, the Connecticut Land Company offered for sale a 17,247-acre tract of land named Bazetta Township. The first settlements in Bazetta were made about 1804 or 1805.

The original proprietors of the land now contained in this township were David Huntington, Nathaniel Shalor, Samuel P. Lord, Sylvester Mather, and Richard McCurdy. Shalor received for his share the northern part of the tract beginning at lot number oneand extending to lot number thirty-seven, inclusive, comprising in all 7,300 acres. Huntington received lots numbers eight and thirty-four. Mather received lots numbers thirty-nine and sixty-five, inclusive, and altogether amounting to 4,469 acres. McCurdy received lots numbers sixty-six and ninety, and all inclusive, or 4,118 acres. Lord received lots numbers ninety-one and one hundred on the southern border, and all inclusive, or 1,635 acres. From these proprietors the early settlers made their purchases, and soon the settlement of Bazetta began.

== Government ==
The township is governed by a three-member board of trustees, who are elected in November of odd-numbered years to a four-year term beginning on the following January 1. Two are elected in the year after the presidential election and one is elected in the year before it. There is also an elected township fiscal officer, who serves a four-year term beginning on April 1 of the year after the election, which is held in November of the year before the presidential election. Vacancies in the fiscal officership or on the board of trustees are filled by the remaining trustees.

== Education ==
Students within Bazetta Township attend Lakeview High School and the Lakeview Local Schools. High school students are permitted to attend Trumbull Career and Technical Center as an alternative to their home school.
