= Ohio State Route 5 =

State highway in northeastern Ohio, US

State Route 5

Route information
- Maintained by ODOT
- Length: 50.91 mi (81.93 km)
- Existed: 1932–present

Major junctions
- West end: I-76 / SR 44 near Ravenna
- I-80 / Ohio Turnpike near Newton Falls; US 422 in Warren Township; SR 11 in Cortland; SR 7 near Kinsman
- East end: PA 58 near Kinsman

Location
- Country: United States
- State: Ohio
- Counties: Portage, Trumbull

Highway system
- Ohio State Highway System; Interstate; US; State; Scenic
← SR 4	→ US 6
← US 27	→ SR 28
← US 36	→ SR 37

State Route 5 (SR 5) is an east–west state highway in the northeastern portion of the U.S. state of Ohio. Its western terminus is at Interstate 76 at its interchange with State Route 44 about 3.5 miles (5.6 km) south of Ravenna, and its eastern terminus is at the Pennsylvania state line northeast of Kinsman; this point is also the western terminus of Pennsylvania Route 58 which begins to the east.

== Route description ==
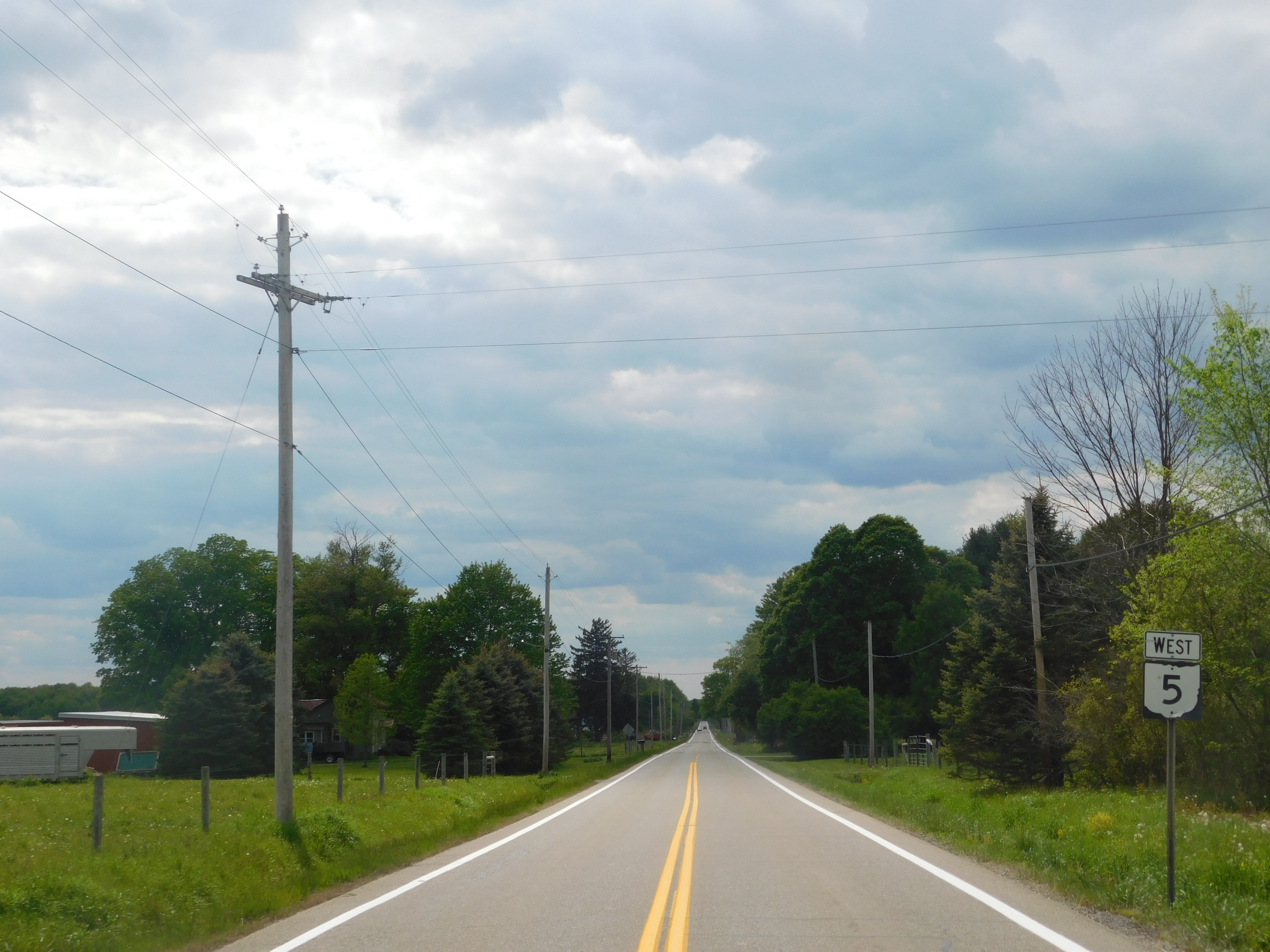
SR 5 westbound in Kinsman

State Route 5 (SR 5) is an east–west state highway in the northeastern portion of the U.S. state of Ohio. Its western terminus is at Interstate 76 at its interchange with State Route 44 about 3.5 miles (5.6 km) south of Ravenna, and its eastern terminus is at the Pennsylvania state line northeast of Kinsman; this point is also the western terminus of Pennsylvania Route 58 which begins to the east.

== History ==
In 1924, the original route was established; it was routed from the Indiana state line 14 miles (23 km) west of Van Wert to the Pennsylvania state line 6 miles (9.7 km) east of East Liverpool along the current U.S. Route 30 from Indiana to Mansfield, current U.S. Route 42 from Mansfield to Ashland, current U.S. Route 250 from Ashland to 5 miles (8.0 km) west of Wooster, U.S. Route 30 from 5 miles (8.0 km) west of Wooster to 2 miles (3.2 km) east of Dalton, State Route 172 from 2 miles (3.2 km) east of Dalton to Waco, U.S. Route 30 from Waco to East Liverpool, and State Route 39 from East Liverpool to Pennsylvania. In 1926, the route was truncated at Delphos and 5 miles (8.0 km) west of Wooster; Indiana to Delphos and 5 miles (8.0 km) west of Wooster to East Liverpool was certified as U.S. Route 30; East Liverpool to Pennsylvania certified as State Route 39; Mansfield to Ashland was dually certified as U.S. Route 42 and State Route 5; Ashland to 5 miles (8.0 km) west of Wooster was dually certified as State Routes 5 and 6. In 1929, the State Route 5's dual certification was removed from U.S. Route 42 and State Route 6. In 1932, Delphos to Mansfield was certified as U.S. Route 30N. Later that same year, the current route was established; it was originally routed along the former State Route 36 from Wooster to the Pennsylvania state line along the current State Route 585, State Route 59, its current routing east of Ravenna, and a currently unnumbered road through Akron. At an unknown time, the route realigned from 4 miles (6.4 km) northeast of Warren to Cortland. In 1969, the western terminus was moved to 3½ south of Ravenna, and routed along a new bypass route to 3 miles (4.8 km) east of Ravenna; the former alignment from Wooster to State Route 21 was certified as State Route 585, while the former alignment from 3 miles (4.8 km) south of Cuyahoga Falls to 3 miles (4.8 km) east of Ravenna was certified as State Route 59. At another unknown time, the route was realigned from 3 miles (4.8 km) east of Ravenna to 7 miles (11 km) west of Warren. In 1970, the Warren Bypass was completed from U.S. Route 422 to 3 miles (4.8 km) northeast of Warren (Elm Road) and was certified as State Route 5B. A year later, it was extended to 3 miles (4.8 km) west of Warren, with the entire bypass being certified as State Route 5 and the State Route 5B designation removed. The bypass was upgraded to a freeway in 1978.

== Major intersections ==
County	Location	mi	km	Destinations	Notes
Portage	Rootstown Township	0.00	0.00	I-76 / SR 44	SR 5 begins at I-76 exit ramp; SR 44 joins from the south (I-76 exit 38)
Portage	Rootstown Township	0.77	1.24	South Prospect Street	Former routing of SR 44 (SR 44C begins north with a length of 0.19 mi.); SR 5/SR 44 bypass route begins
Portage	Ravenna Township	3.70	5.95	SR 14 / SR 44	SR 14 passes over northwest-southeast; SR 44 leaves concurrency via full-access interchange to join SR 14 bypass northwest
Portage	Ravenna Township	4.32	6.95	SR 59	SR 59 ends to the west; end of SR 5 bypass
Portage	Paris Township	10.29	16.56	Newton Falls Road	Former routing of SR 5
Portage	Paris Township	12.69	20.42	SR 225	SR 225 ends to the south
Trumbull	Braceville Township	17.00	27.36	SR 534	SR 534 crosses south–north
Trumbull	Braceville Township	18.49	29.76	I-80 / Ohio Turnpike	Turnpike passes over northwest-southeast; full-access interchange (turnpike exit 209)
Trumbull	Braceville Township	20.22	32.54	Warren Ravenna Road	Former routing of SR 5
Trumbull	Braceville Township	20.79	33.46	SR 82	SR 82 joins from the west
Trumbull	Warren Township	21.12	33.99	Burnett Street	Former routing of SR 5
Trumbull	Warren Township			Western end of freeway (Warren Bypass)	
Trumbull	Warren Township	22.27	35.84	West Market Street – Leavittsburg, Warren	Former SR 82 alignment (after bypass was constructed) begins to the east; full-access interchange
Trumbull	Warren Township	24.00	38.62	US 422 (Parkman Road) – Warren	US 422 passes under northwest-southeast; full-access interchange
Trumbull	Champion Heights	26.16	42.10	SR 45 – Warren, Ashtabula	SR 45 passes under south–north; full-access interchange
Trumbull	Bazetta Township	28.25	45.46	Perkins Jones Road, Larchmont Avenue Extension	Road passes over; full-access interchange
Trumbull	Bazetta Township	29.50	47.48	SR 82 – Warren, Cortland	SR 5 exits freeway, continuing northeast; SR 82 continues southeast on freeway
Trumbull	Bazetta Township	30.73	49.46	Warren Meadville Road	Former routing of SR 5
Trumbull	Bazetta Township	32.80	52.79	SR 305	SR 305 crosses west–east
Trumbull	Cortland	33.66	54.17	SR 46	SR 46 joins from the south
Trumbull	Cortland	33.80	54.40	SR 46	SR 46 leaves to the north; former southwestern alignment of SR 5
Trumbull	Johnston Township	37.70	60.67	SR 11	SR 11 passes under south–north; full-access interchange
Trumbull	Johnston Township	39.75	63.97	SR 88	SR 88 joins from the west
Trumbull	Johnston Township	40.00	64.37	SR 193	SR 193 crosses south–north
Trumbull	Johnston Township	41.41	66.64	SR 88	SR 88 leaves to the east
Trumbull	Kinsman Township	46.35	74.59	SR 7	SR 7 joins from the south
Trumbull	Kinsman Township	47.54	76.51	SR 87	SR 87 ends to the west
Trumbull	Kinsman Township	47.89	77.07	SR 7	SR 7 leaves to the north
Trumbull	Kinsman Township	50.91	81.93	PA 58	Eastern terminus of SR 5 at Pennsylvania state line
1.000 mi = 1.609 km; 1.000 km = 0.621 mi: Concurrency terminus
