= Lakeview School District =

Lakeview School District may refer to:

- Lakeview School District (Battle Creek, Michigan), a school district in Battle Creek, Michigan
- Lakeview School District (Mercer County, Pennsylvania), a school district in Pennsylvania
- Lakeview School District (Oregon), a school district in Oregon
- Lakeview Local Schools, a school district in Ohio
- Lakeview Public Schools (Michigan), a school district in Michigan
- Lakeview Schools, a school district in Minnesota
- Lake View School District, a former school district in Arkansas
- Dillon School District One, a school district in Lake View, South Carolina
