= Ohio State Route 169 =

State highway in Trumbull County, Ohio, US

State Route 169

Route information
- Maintained by ODOT
- Length: 6.764 mi (10.886 km)
- Existed: 1923–present

Major junctions
- South end: US 422 in Weathersfield Township
- SR 46 in Niles
- North end: US 422 in Warren

Location
- Country: United States
- State: Ohio
- Counties: Trumbull

Highway system
- Ohio State Highway System; Interstate; US; State; Scenic
← SR 168	→ SR 170

State Route 169 (SR 169) is a state highway in the northeastern portion of the U.S. state of Ohio that is signed north–south, but trends more east–west. The southern (eastern) terminus of SR 169 is at a signalized intersection with U.S. Route 422 (US 422) just east of Niles. The northern (western) terminus of the highway is at a signalized intersection with US 422 in Warren.

== Route description ==
From its southern terminus at US 422 and Tibbetts Wick Road, SR 169 heads west along the two-lane Robbins Avenue in Weathersfield Township through a mostly residential neighborhood. About 1/3 mile (0.54 km) in, it enters the city of Niles and gains a center turn lane. As the road enters the downtown area, more businesses line the road. At Vienna Avenue, SR 46 joins SR 169 on a 0.3-mile (0.48 km) concurrency through the city. The highway becomes four lanes wide as it passes under a pair of railroad bridges. Robbins Avenue ends at Main Street where SR 46 heads south and SR 169 heads north. Along Main Street, the highway has a total of four lanes (a mix of through and turning lanes), passes under the same railroad previously crossed, and turns northwest. As SR 169 exits Niles for Weathersfield Township and later Howland Township, its name changes to Niles Road and reduces to two lanes passing through a mixed commercial/residential area. After entering the city of Warren, it passes Oakwood Cemetery and crosses a railroad at-grade before ending at the intersection of US 422 (South Street) and Chestnut Avenue.

The entirety of SR 169 exists within Trumbull County. No part of this route is inclusive within the National Highway System.

== History ==
SR 169 was created in 1923 as a northeast bypass of Niles, with SR 16 going through Niles. In 1927, SR 169 was moved to SR 16's routing through Niles, and the Niles bypass became part of the newly-designated US 422. Until August 2007, SR 169 ran west with US 422 in Warren to the SR 45 intersection.

== Major intersections ==
The entire route is in Trumbull County.

Location	mi	km	Destinations	Notes
Weathersfield Township	0.000	0.000	US 422 (Youngstown-Warren Road) / Tibbets Wick Road – Girard, Youngstown	
Niles	2.184	3.515	SR 46 north (Vienna Avenue) / Mahoning Avenue SE	Southern end of SR 46 concurrency
Niles	2.480	3.991	SR 46 south (North Main Street)	Northern end of SR 46 concurrency
Warren	6.764	10.886	US 422 east (South Street SE) / Chestnut Avenue SE	
1.000 mi = 1.609 km; 1.000 km = 0.621 mi: Concurrency terminus
