= Lakeview Local School District =

School District located in Cortland, Ohio U.S.

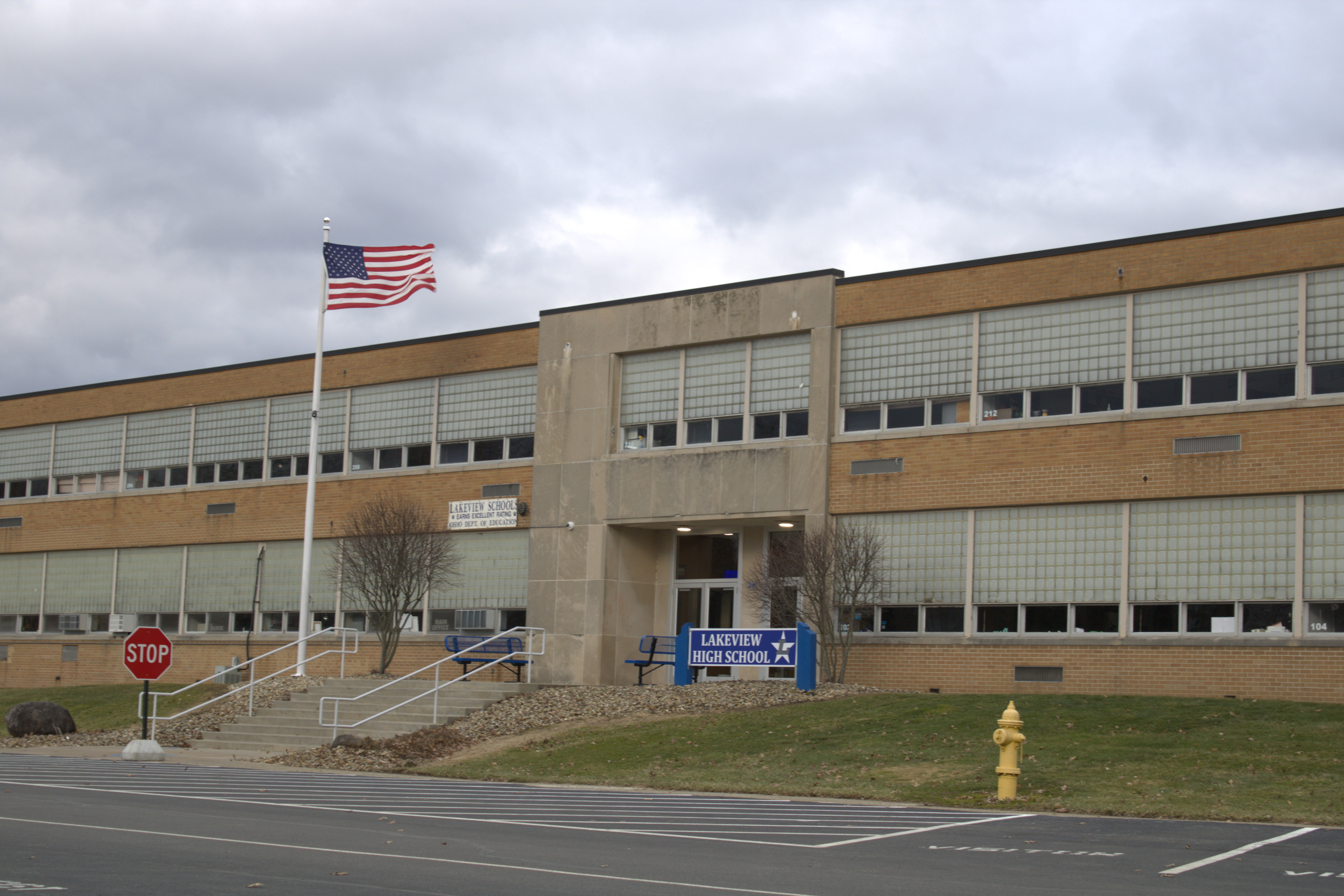
- Lakeview High School building

Address
- 300 Hillman Dr. Cortland, Ohio, 44410; United States

District information
- Type: Public
- Motto: "Together We Are Lakeview"
- Grades: K–12
- Established: 1961
- Superintendent: Ashley Handyrch
- NCES District ID: 3905018

Students and staff
- Enrollment: 1,501 (2024-25)
- Faculty: 87.79 (on an FTE basis)
- Student–teacher ratio: 17.10

Other information
- Website: www.lakeviewlocal.org

The Lakeview Local School District is a school district located in Cortland in Trumbull County, Ohio United States. The school district serves one high school, middle school and elementary school. The district serves students in grades 9th through 12th living in Cortland, Ohio and parts of Bazetta and Mecca townships.

== History ==
The Lakeview Local School District was formed in 1956, with the consolidations of Cortland and Lakeview schools. Lakeview High School was built a few years later in 1961. The original middle school was constructed in 1978, with Cortland's population growing. Renovations to the high school took place in 1971, with the addition of a gymnasium, cafeteria and band room. Raidel Auditorium was built in 1996.

In the 2018-19 school year, Lakeview Schools consolidated the Cortland Elementary and Lakeview Middle School buildings and built a new PK-8 campus. The middle school was torn down in June 2018, while the old elementary school building still stands as of 2026, with the city purchasing the vacant property for $85,000 in August 2025, exploring protentional redevelopment of the former campus, including possibly turning it into a new fire station for the city.

== Schools ==
School within the district include:

=== High school ===
- Lakeview High School

=== Middle school ===
- Lakeview Middle School

=== Elementary school ===
- Lakeview Elementary School

=== Former Schools ===
- Cortland Elementary School
