= Mulberry, Ohio =

- Census-designated place
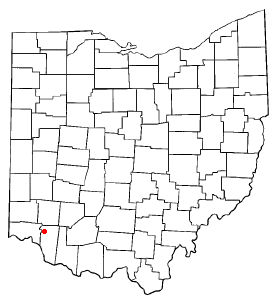
- Location of Mulberry, Ohio
- Coordinates: 39°11′46″N 84°14′50″W
- Country: United States
- State: Ohio
- County: Clermont
- Township: Miami

Area
  - Total: 1.60 sq mi (4.15 km^{2})
  - Land: 1.60 sq mi (4.15 km^{2})
  - Water: 0 sq mi (0.00 km^{2})
- Elevation: 797 ft (243 m)

Population (2020)
  - Total: 3,459
  - Density: 2,158/sq mi (833.2/km^{2})
- Time zone: UTC-5 (Eastern (EST))
  - Summer (DST): UTC-4 (EDT)
- ZIP code: 45150
- Area codes: 283 and 513
- FIPS code: 39-53270
- GNIS feature ID: 2393141

Mulberry is a census-designated place (CDP) in Miami Township, Clermont County, Ohio, United States. The population was 3,459 at the 2020 census.

== History ==
Mulberry was known as "Newberry" when it was laid out in 1818. The post office closed in 1971.

== Geography ==
Mulberry is located in northwestern Clermont County near the center of Miami Township. It is bordered to the east by Mount Repose. Ohio State Route 28 passes through the southeast corner of the CDP, and Interstate 275 forms the western edge, with access to Mulberry where it crosses State Route 28 at Exit 57. Downtown Cincinnati is 18 miles (29 km) to the west via State Route 28 and U.S. Route 50.

According to the United States Census Bureau, the CDP has a total area of 1.6 square miles (4.1 km^{2}), all land.

== Demographics ==
Historical population
Census	Pop.	Note	%±
2020	3,459		—
U.S. Decennial Census

=== 2020 census ===
As of the 2020 census, Mulberry had a population of 3,459. The median age was 54.2 years. 14.7% of residents were under the age of 18 and 31.9% of residents were 65 years of age or older. For every 100 females there were 84.0 males, and for every 100 females age 18 and over there were 79.3 males age 18 and over.

100.0% of residents lived in urban areas, while 0.0% lived in rural areas.

There were 1,508 households in Mulberry, of which 23.5% had children under the age of 18 living in them. Of all households, 42.6% were married-couple households, 15.7% were households with a male householder and no spouse or partner present, and 37.1% were households with a female householder and no spouse or partner present. About 35.3% of all households were made up of individuals and 19.9% had someone living alone who was 65 years of age or older.

There were 1,598 housing units, of which 5.6% were vacant. The homeowner vacancy rate was 1.7% and the rental vacancy rate was 10.8%.

Racial composition as of the 2020 census
Race	Number	Percent
White	3,176	91.8%
Black or African American	58	1.7%
American Indian and Alaska Native	8	0.2%
Asian	30	0.9%
Native Hawaiian and Other Pacific Islander	3	0.1%
Some other race	22	0.6%
Two or more races	162	4.7%
Hispanic or Latino (of any race)	61	1.8%

=== 2000 census ===
As of the 2000 census, there were 3,139 people, 1,196 households, and 800 families residing in the CDP. The population density was 2,072.7 inhabitants per square mile (800.3/km^{2}). There were 1,229 housing units at an average density of 811.5 per square mile (313.3/km^{2}). The racial makeup of the CDP was 97.26% White, 0.92% African American, 0.29% Native American, 0.73% Asian, 0.03% Pacific Islander, 0.19% from other races, and 0.57% from two or more races. Hispanic or Latino of any race were 0.73% of the population.

There were 1,196 households, out of which 31.2% had children under the age of 18 living with them, 53.3% were married couples living together, 10.6% had a female householder with no husband present, and 33.1% were non-families. 28.1% of all households were made up of individuals, and 8.5% had someone living alone who was 65 years of age or older. The average household size was 2.34 and the average family size was 2.87.

In the CDP the population was spread out, with 20.5% under the age of 18, 8.8% from 18 to 24, 25.1% from 25 to 44, 25.1% from 45 to 64, and 20.5% who were 65 years of age or older. The median age was 42 years. For every 100 females there were 78.1 males. For every 100 females age 18 and over, there were 73.9 males.

The median income for a household in the CDP was $50,326, and the median income for a family was $64,044. Males had a median income of $42,264 versus $28,686 for females. The per capita income for the CDP was $26,623. None of the families and 4.2% of the population were living below the poverty line, including no under eighteens and 11.8% of those over 64.
