= Howland Center, Ohio =

- Census-designated place
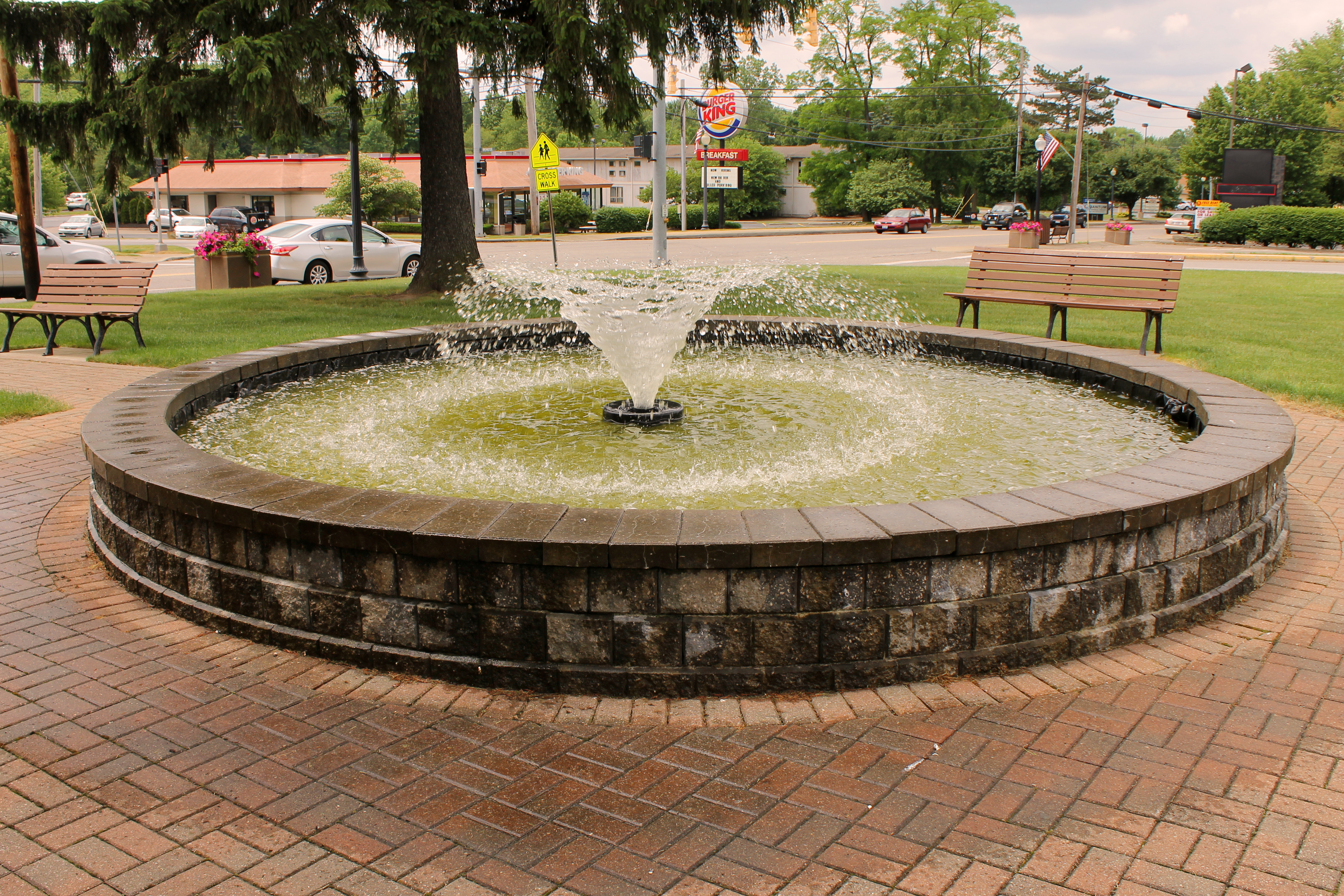
- Fountain in Richard E. Orwig Park

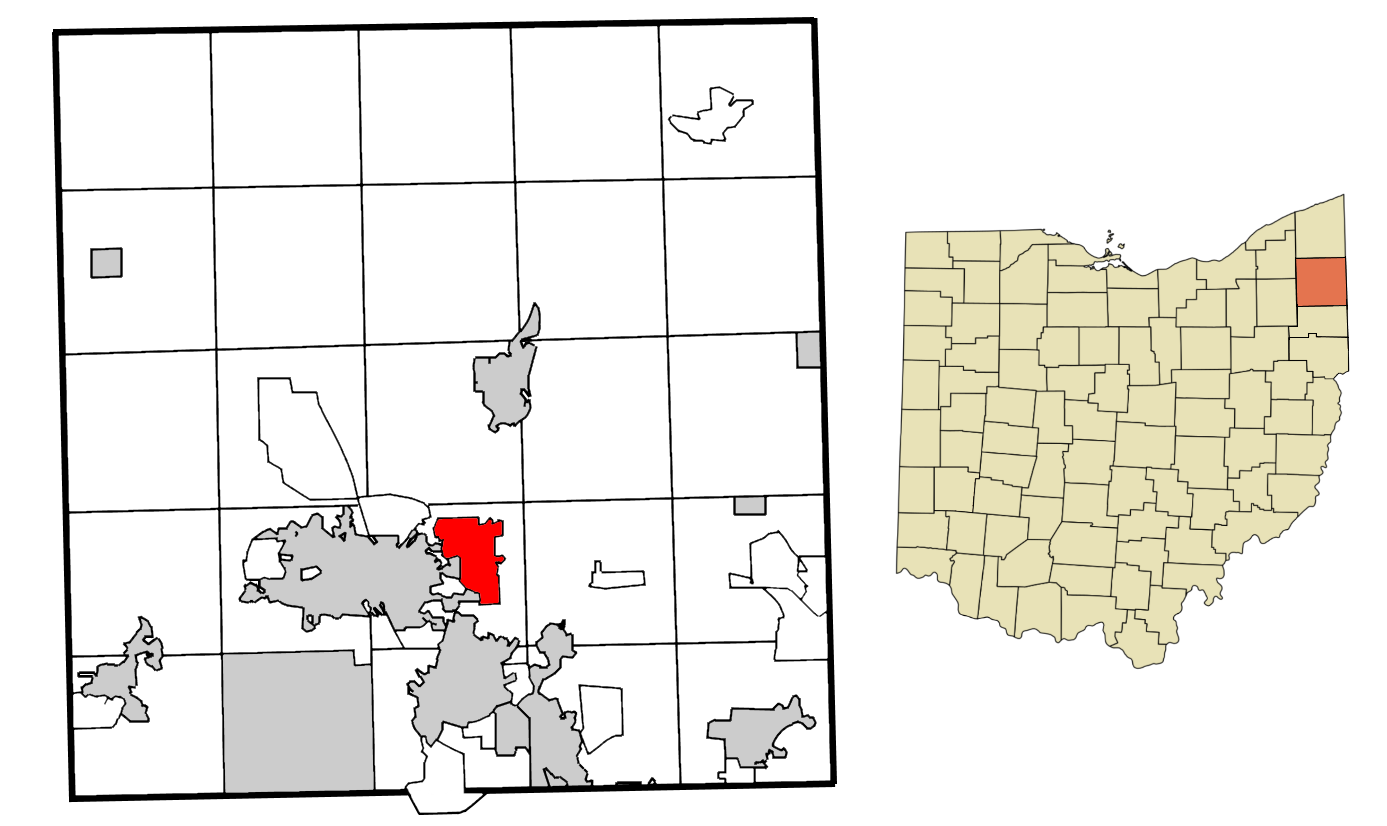
- Location of Howland Center in Trumbull County, Ohio.
- Coordinates: 41°15′16″N 80°45′00″W
- Country: United States
- State: Ohio
- County: Trumbull

Area
  - Total: 4.05 sq mi (10.49 km^{2})
  - Land: 4.05 sq mi (10.49 km^{2})
  - Water: 0 sq mi (0.00 km^{2})
- Elevation: 892 ft (272 m)

Population (2020)
  - Total: 6,351
  - Density: 1,568.7/sq mi (605.67/km^{2})
- Time zone: UTC-5 (Eastern (EST))
  - Summer (DST): UTC-4 (EDT)
- ZIP code: 44484
- Area codes: 234 and 330
- FIPS code: 39-36557
- GNIS feature ID: 2393056

Howland Center, also referred to as simply Howland, is an unincorporated community and census-designated place in south-central Trumbull County, Ohio, United States. The population was 6,351 at the 2020 census. A suburb consisting of unincorporated urban portions of Howland Township, it is part of the Youngstown–Warren metropolitan area.

== History ==
In 1620, John Howland landed in Plymouth, Massachusetts aboard the Mayflower. A descendant of his, Joseph Howland, purchased the township from the Connecticut Land Company in 1795. The first settler arrived in 1799, and Howland Township was organized in 1812. A sawmill was constructed in Howland in 1814, with a gristmill constructed the following year. Circa 1830, Howland Springs began operation as a health spa; it operated in the township until it burned in 1882. The Howland Local School District was formed in 1917 from the consolidation of five one-room schools. The township was sparsely populated until 1953, when the Clifton-Hyde housing development was built. The township has seen sustained growth since that time, as the nearby cities of Warren and Youngstown have suburbanized the township.

== Geography ==
According to the United States Census Bureau, the CDP has a total area of 4.0 square miles (10.5 km^{2}), all land.

== Demographics ==
Historical population
Census	Pop.	Note	%±
2000	6,481		—
2010	6,351		−2.0%
2020	6,351		0.0%
U.S. Decennial Census

As of the census of 2000, there were 6,481 people, 2,462 households, and 1,925 families residing in the CDP. The population density was 1,605.9 inhabitants per square mile (620.0/km^{2}). There were 2,565 housing units at an average density of 635.6 per square mile (245.4/km^{2}). The racial makeup of the CDP was 95.45% White, 1.67% African American, 0.06% Native American, 1.57% Asian, 0.02% Pacific Islander, 0.17% from other races, and 1.06% from two or more races. 0.80% of the population are Hispanic or Latino of any race.

There were 2,462 households, out of which 32.3% had children under the age of 18 living with them, 66.9% were married couples living together, 8.4% had a female householder with no husband present, and 21.8% were non-families. 19.6% of all households were made up of individuals, and 7.6% had someone living alone who was 65 years of age or older. The average household size was 2.60 and the average family size was 2.98.

In the CDP the population was spread out, with 23.8% under the age of 18, 6.0% from 18 to 24, 25.6% from 25 to 44, 29.5% from 45 to 64, and 15.1% who were 65 years of age or older. The median age was 42 years. For every 100 females there were 95.6 males. For every 100 females age 18 and over, there were 92.6 males.

The median income for a household in the CDP was $52,317, and the median income for a family was $59,485. Males had a median income of $42,278 versus $29,232 for females. The per capita income for the CDP was $24,180. About 1.2% of families and 2.0% of the population were below the poverty line, including 0.8% of those under the age of 18 and 5.5% of those ages 65 and older.

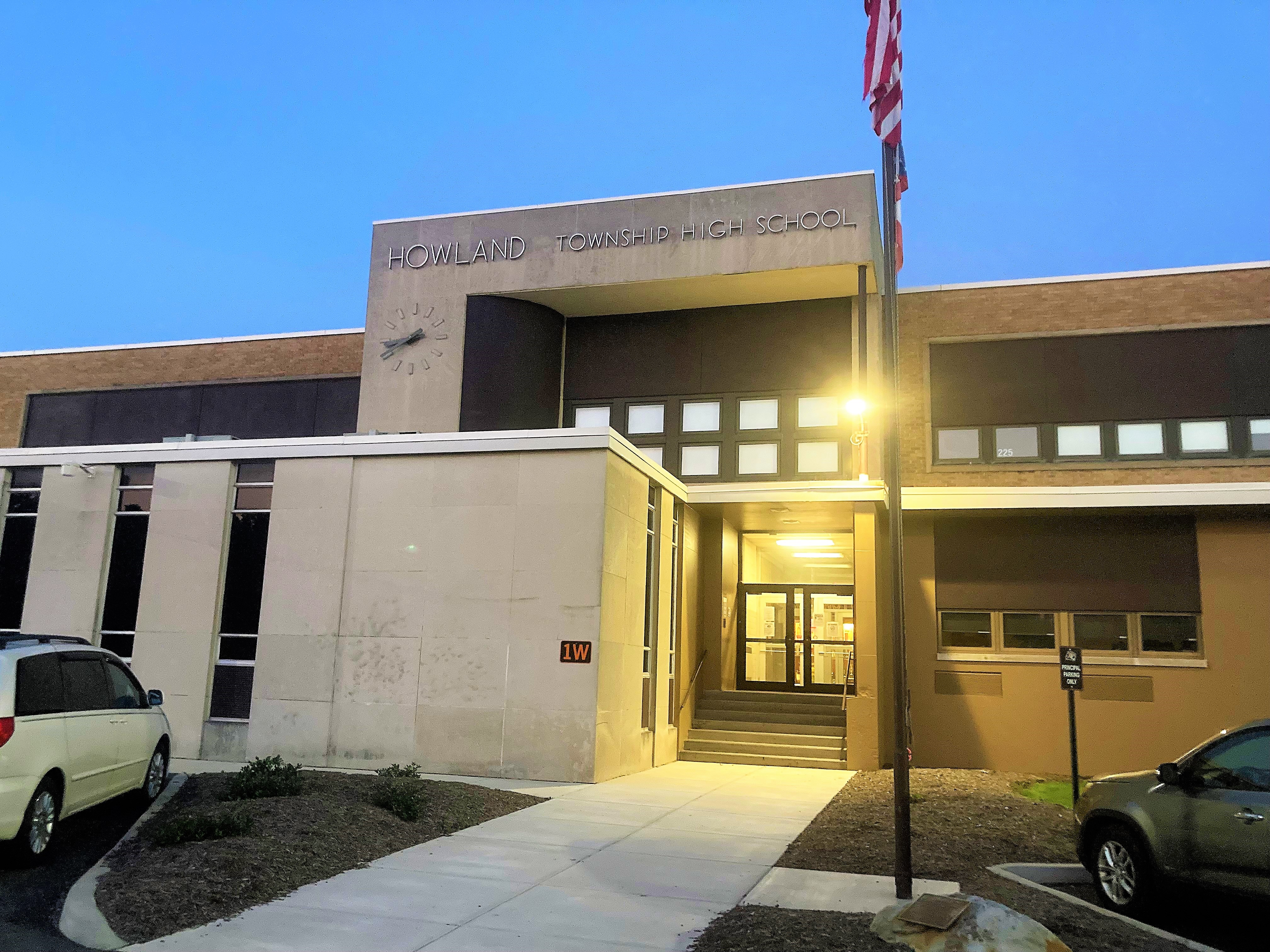
Howland High School

== Education ==
Howland is served by the public Howland Local School District, which includes Howland Springs Elementary School (grades PK–K), Howland Glen Elementary School (grades 1–2), Mines Elementary School (grades 3–4), Howland Middle School (grades 5–8) and Howland High School (grades 9–12).
