= Miami Township, Clermont County, Ohio =

Township in Ohio, United States

- Township
- Flag Seal Logo

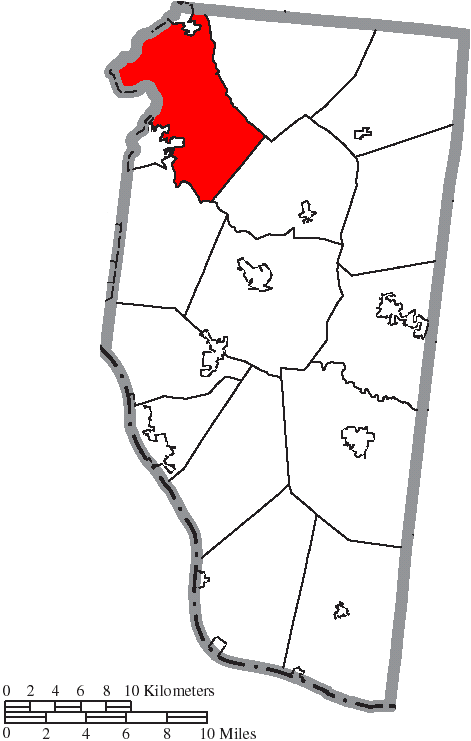
- Location of Miami Township in Clermont County
- Coordinates: 39°11′51″N 84°14′49″W
- Country: United States
- State: Ohio
- County: Clermont

Area
  - Total: 33.4 sq mi (86.6 km^{2})
  - Land: 33.1 sq mi (85.6 km^{2})
  - Water: 0.39 sq mi (1.0 km^{2})
- Elevation: 807 ft (246 m)

Population (2020)
  - Total: 43,943
  - Density: 1,236/sq mi (477.3/km^{2})
- Time zone: UTC-5 (Eastern (EST))
  - Summer (DST): UTC-4 (EDT)
- Postal code: 45150
- Area code: 513
- FIPS code: 39-49322
- GNIS feature ID: 1085866
- Website: www.miamitwpoh.gov

Miami Township is one of the fourteen townships of Clermont County, Ohio, United States. The population at the 2020 census was 43,943.

== History ==
The area covering the City of Milford, O'Bannon (now Miami) Township, and part of the City of Loveland is from a single 1788 survey by John Nancarrow, a Revolutionary War veteran from Virginia. As one of Clermont County's major historians noted, "No wonder, then, that it struck with rapture the quaint and eccentric John Nancarrow, who had it surveyed for him on May 28, 1788 as Dutch burgomaster intended to found a city that should become the future metropolis of the West." Miami Township was created in 1801 as O'Bannon Township, after O'Bannon Creek, a tributary of the Little Miami River that runs through the township. This creek was named for Clermont's first surveyor, John O'Bannon, who was not connected to, responsible for, or interested at all in Nancarrow's survey area. John O'Bannon had instead made the county's first survey on Virginia Military District land on Nov. 13, 1787, on the site of the village of Neville. The township's name, shortly after 1801, was changed to Miami, after the Little Miami River. The particular stretch of the circle highway Interstate 275 was completed in 1975, built through the middle of the community.

== Geography ==
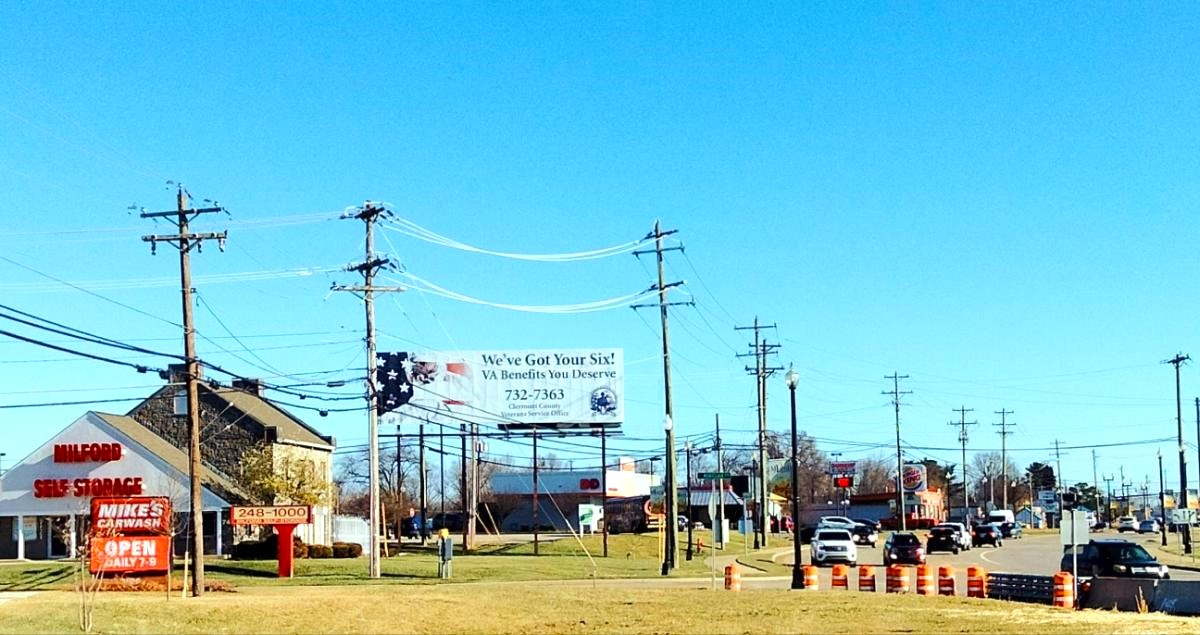
Rt. 28, known as Main Street or Business 28, is a heavily developed, high-traffic boulevard.

Located in the northwestern corner of the county, it borders the following townships:

- Hamilton Township, Warren County - north
- Goshen Township - northeast
- Stonelick Township - southeast
- Union Township - south
- Anderson Township, Hamilton County - southwest corner
- Columbia Township, Hamilton County - southwest, north of Anderson Township
- Symmes Township, Hamilton County - west

Many populated places are located in Miami Township:

- Part of the city of Loveland, in the north
- Part of the city of Milford, in the southwest
- The census-designated place of Day Heights, in the center
- The census-designated place of Mount Repose, in the center
- The census-designated place of Mulberry, in the west
- The census-designated place of Miamiville, in the west.

== Government ==
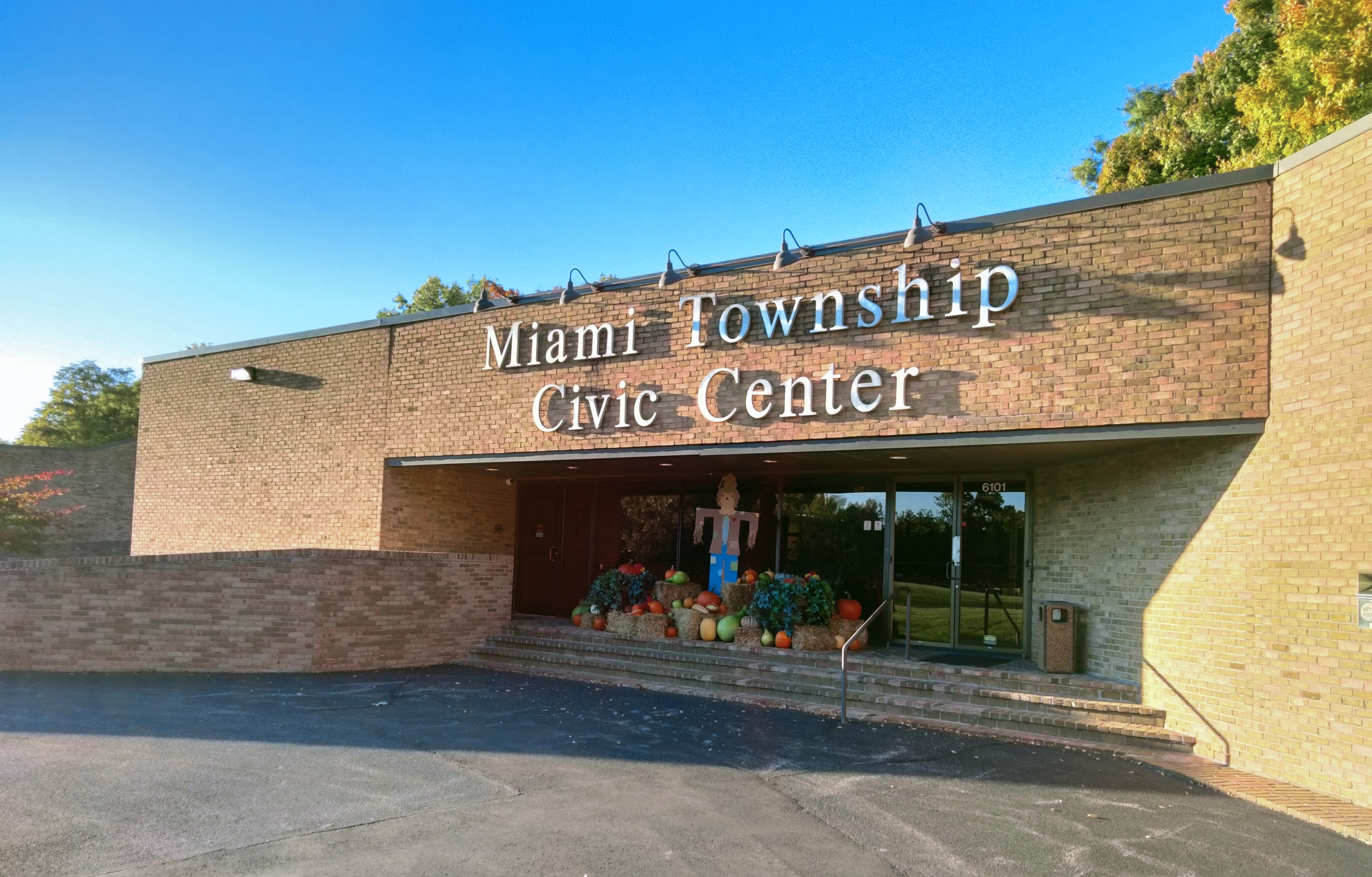
Miami Township Civic Center on Meijer Drive

In 1991, the state legislature and George Voinovich adopted "Limited Home Rule Townships" as a schism from the Ohio Constitution's Municipal Home Rule established in 1912. The alteration devolved townships which chose limited home rule government to be similar to municipalities but without full home rule, a city code, comprehensive zoning, among a host of other traits. The result is many developed townships which would have sought shared municipal incorporation with cities or villages have not maximized property value and do not have basic support for services and infrastructure, relying exclusively on reduced state funding—much of which comes from federal investments for roadwork. The autonomy which was sought has effectively been unable to reserve responsibility for the community and instead outsourced that responsibility to state intervention.

The township is governed by a three-member board of trustees elected in November of odd-numbered years to a four-year term beginning on the following January 1. Two are elected in the year after the presidential election and one is elected in the year before it. There is also an elected township fiscal officer, who serves a four-year term beginning on April 1 of the year after the election, which is held in November of the year before the presidential election. Vacancies in the fiscal officership or on the board of trustees are filled by the remaining trustees.

Unlike Miami Township in Clermont County, all the other Miami namesakes in the State of Ohio are actually located in the Miami Valley region, including the Great Miami River, Miami County, Miami University, Miamisburg, Little Miami High School, and Miami Townships within Greene, Hamilton, Logan, and Montgomery counties.

== Media ==
The Clermont Sun is the county newspaper while the Eastside Press serves the eastern communities of Greater Cincinnati, both catering to Milford-Miami Township.

== Notable people ==
- Jean Schmidt – U.S. and state representative
- Philip Bergen Swing – U.S. district judge
- Joe Uecker – Ohio state senator and representative

== See also ==
- Milford High School (Ohio)
- Clermont County, Ohio
- Urban township (Ohio)
