= Day Heights, Ohio =

- Census-designated place
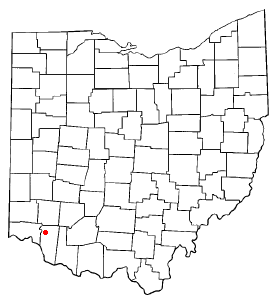
- Location of Day Heights, Ohio
- Coordinates: 39°10′32″N 84°13′39″W
- Country: United States
- State: Ohio
- County: Clermont
- Township: Miami

Area
  - Total: 1.18 sq mi (3.05 km^{2})
  - Land: 1.18 sq mi (3.05 km^{2})
  - Water: 0 sq mi (0.00 km^{2})
- Elevation: 866 ft (264 m)

Population (2020)
  - Total: 2,625
  - Density: 2,228.0/sq mi (860.24/km^{2})
- Time zone: UTC-5 (Eastern (EST))
  - Summer (DST): UTC-4 (EDT)
- ZIP code: 45150
- Area code: 513
- FIPS code: 39-20366
- GNIS feature ID: 2393392

Day Heights is a census-designated place (CDP) in Miami Township, Clermont County, Ohio, United States. The population was 2,625 at the 2020 census.

== Geography ==
Day Heights is located in northwestern Clermont County, south of the geographic center of Miami Township. It is bordered to the north by the community of Mount Repose. Ohio State Route 131 passes through the center of Day Heights, leading west 3.5 miles (5.6 km) down the hill into Milford. Downtown Cincinnati is 19 miles (31 km) west of Day Heights.

According to the United States Census Bureau, the CDP has a total area of 1.2 square miles (3.1 km^{2}), all land.

== Demographics ==
Historical population
| Census | Pop. | Note | %± |
|---|---|---|---|
| 2020 | 2,625 | | — |
U.S. Decennial Census

As of the census of 2000, there were 2,823 people, 1,006 households, and 844 families residing in the CDP. The population density was 2,347.0 inhabitants per square mile (906.2/km^{2}). There were 1,020 housing units at an average density of 848.0 per square mile (327.4/km^{2}). The racial makeup of the CDP was 97.48% White, 0.99% African American, 0.11% Native American, 0.25% Asian, 0.50% from other races, and 0.67% from two or more races. Hispanic or Latino of any race were 0.50% of the population.

There were 1,006 households, out of which 35.0% had children under the age of 18 living with them, 73.0% were married couples living together, 7.5% had a female householder with no husband present, and 16.1% were non-families. 14.1% of all households were made up of individuals, and 6.5% had someone living alone who was 65 years of age or older. The average household size was 2.81 and the average family size was 3.09.

In the CDP the population was spread out, with 25.6% under the age of 18, 7.2% from 18 to 24, 27.2% from 25 to 44, 28.7% from 45 to 64, and 11.3% who were 65 years of age or older. The median age was 39 years. For every 100 females there were 99.5 males. For every 100 females age 18 and over, there were 97.4 males.

The median income for a household in the CDP was $64,375, and the median income for a family was $70,229. Males had a median income of $41,362 versus $27,270 for females. The per capita income for the CDP was $25,267. About 1.0% of families and 2.3% of the population were below the poverty line, including 3.3% of those under age 18 and 6.3% of those age 65 or over.

== Gallery ==
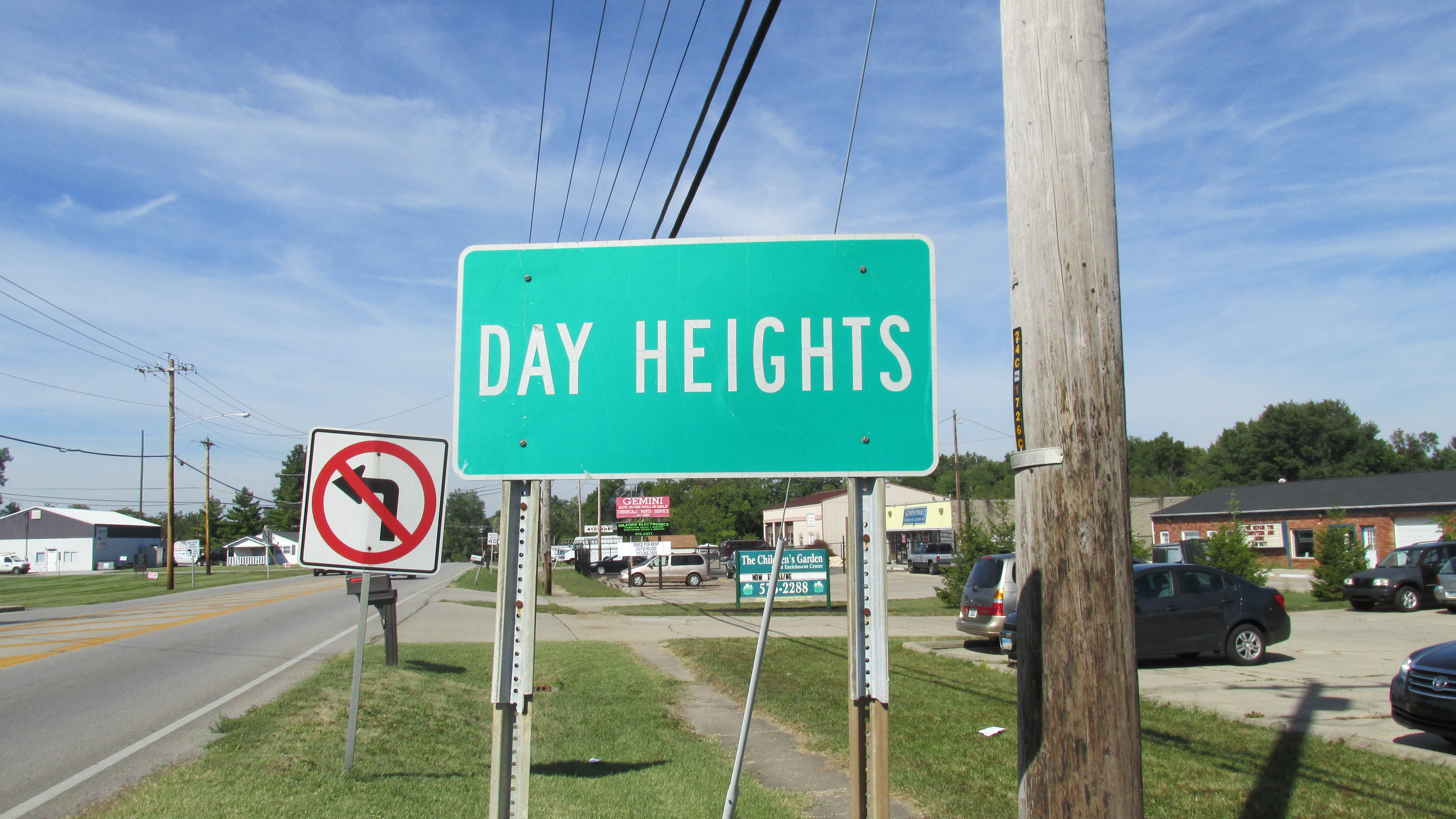
Day Heights community sign

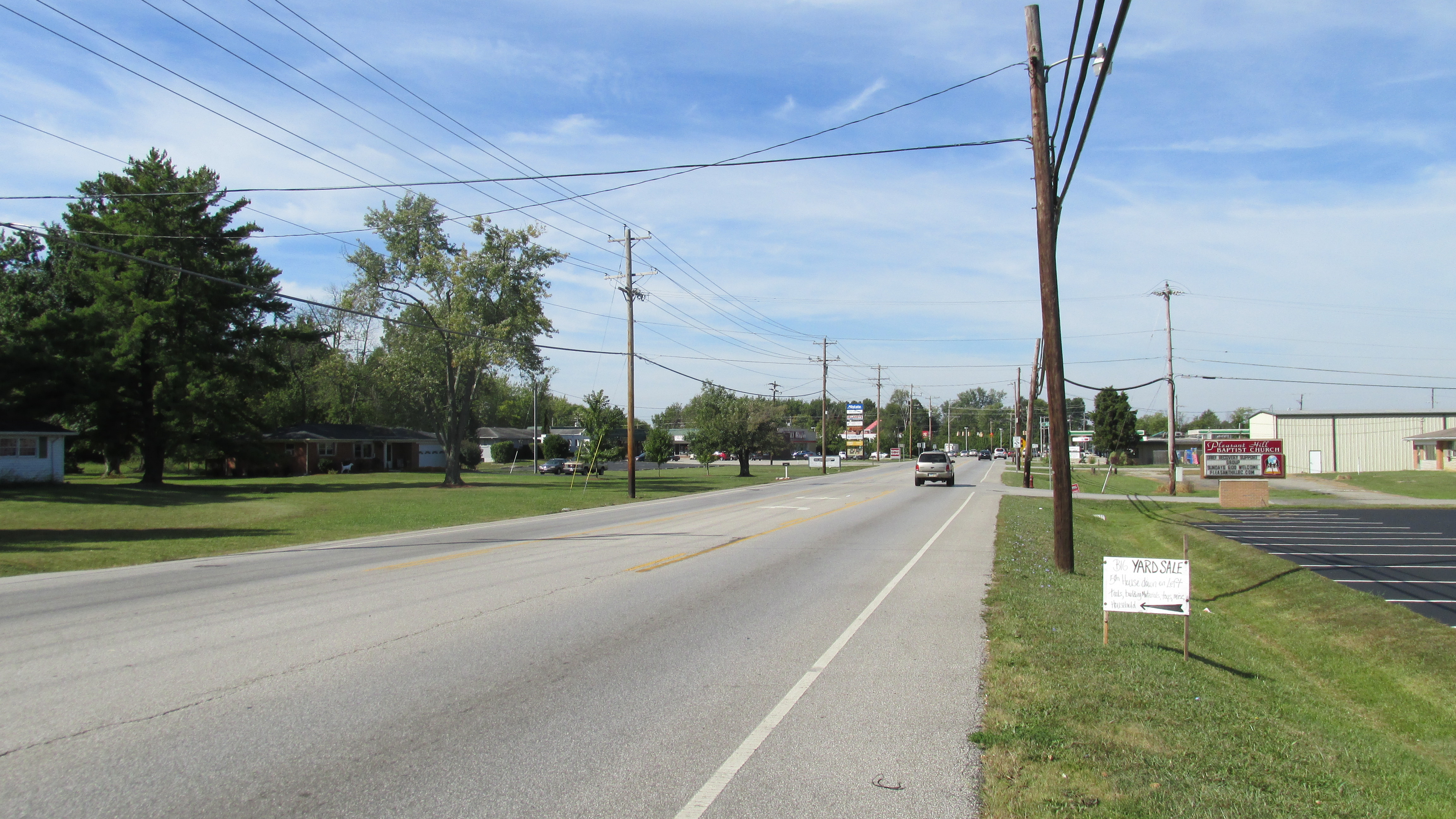
Looking west on Ohio Highway 131 in Day Heights
