= Mount Repose, Ohio =

- Census-designated place
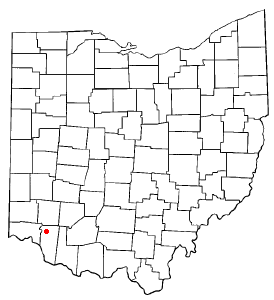
- Location of Mount Repose, Ohio
- Coordinates: 39°11′26″N 84°13′11″W
- Country: United States
- State: Ohio
- County: Clermont
- Township: Miami

Area
  - Total: 2.05 sq mi (5.32 km^{2})
  - Land: 2.05 sq mi (5.31 km^{2})
  - Water: 0 sq mi (0.00 km^{2})
- Elevation: 869 ft (265 m)

Population (2020)
  - Total: 4,648
  - Density: 2,265.5/sq mi (874.73/km^{2})
- Time zone: UTC-5 (Eastern (EST))
  - Summer (DST): UTC-4 (EDT)
- ZIP code: 45150
- Area code: 513
- FIPS code: 39-53032
- GNIS feature ID: 2393140

Mount Repose is a census-designated place (CDP) in Miami Township, Clermont County, Ohio, United States. The population was 4,648 at the 2020 census.

== History ==
Mount Repose had its start in the 1820s when a small country store was established there. A post office called Mount Repose opened in 1867, and remained in operation until 1907.

== Geography ==
Mount Repose is located in northwestern Clermont County slightly southeast of the geographic center of Miami Township. It is bordered to the west by Mulberry and to the south by Day Heights. Ohio State Route 28 passes through Mount Repose, leading northeast 4 miles (6 km) to Goshen and southwest 4 miles (6 km) to Milford. Downtown Cincinnati is 20 miles (32 km) to the southwest.

According to the United States Census Bureau, the Mount Repose CDP has a total area of 2.0 square miles (5.3 km^{2}), all land.

== Demographics ==
Historical population
Census	Pop.	Note	%±
2020	4,648		—
U.S. Decennial Census

=== 2020 census ===
As of the 2020 census, Mount Repose had a population of 4,648. The median age was 40.1 years. 24.7% of residents were under the age of 18 and 17.9% of residents were 65 years of age or older. For every 100 females there were 91.5 males, and for every 100 females age 18 and over there were 89.8 males age 18 and over.

100.0% of residents lived in urban areas, while 0.0% lived in rural areas.

There were 1,811 households in Mount Repose, of which 34.5% had children under the age of 18 living in them. Of all households, 50.8% were married-couple households, 16.3% were households with a male householder and no spouse or partner present, and 25.2% were households with a female householder and no spouse or partner present. About 24.5% of all households were made up of individuals and 11.3% had someone living alone who was 65 years of age or older.

There were 1,877 housing units, of which 3.5% were vacant. The homeowner vacancy rate was 0.5% and the rental vacancy rate was 3.3%.

Racial composition as of the 2020 census
Race	Number	Percent
White	4,222	90.8%
Black or African American	48	1.0%
American Indian and Alaska Native	5	0.1%
Asian	63	1.4%
Native Hawaiian and Other Pacific Islander	8	0.2%
Some other race	45	1.0%
Two or more races	257	5.5%
Hispanic or Latino (of any race)	114	2.5%

=== 2000 census ===
As of the census of 2000, there were 4,102 people, 1,481 households, and 1,158 families residing in the CDP. The population density was 2,103.6 inhabitants per square mile (812.2/km^{2}). There were 1,526 housing units at an average density of 782.6 per square mile (302.2/km^{2}). The racial makeup of the CDP was 97.03% White, 1.05% African American, 0.20% Native American, 0.68% Asian, 0.10% from other races, and 0.95% from two or more races. Hispanic or Latino of any race were 0.85% of the population.

There were 1,481 households, out of which 41.1% had children under the age of 18 living with them, 66.7% were married couples living together, 8.1% had a female householder with no husband present, and 21.8% were non-families. 18.6% of all households were made up of individuals, and 7.5% had someone living alone who was 65 years of age or older. The average household size was 2.77 and the average family size was 3.18.

In the CDP the population was spread out, with 28.7% under the age of 18, 7.3% from 18 to 24, 32.4% from 25 to 44, 23.4% from 45 to 64, and 8.2% who were 65 years of age or older. The median age was 34 years. For every 100 females there were 95.1 males. For every 100 females age 18 and over, there were 94.2 males.

The median income for a household in the CDP was $56,019, and the median income for a family was $62,770. Males had a median income of $42,520 versus $31,448 for females. The per capita income for the CDP was $21,303. About 3.3% of families and 5.1% of the population were below the poverty line, including 6.3% of those under age 18 and 7.4% of those age 65 or over.

== Gallery ==
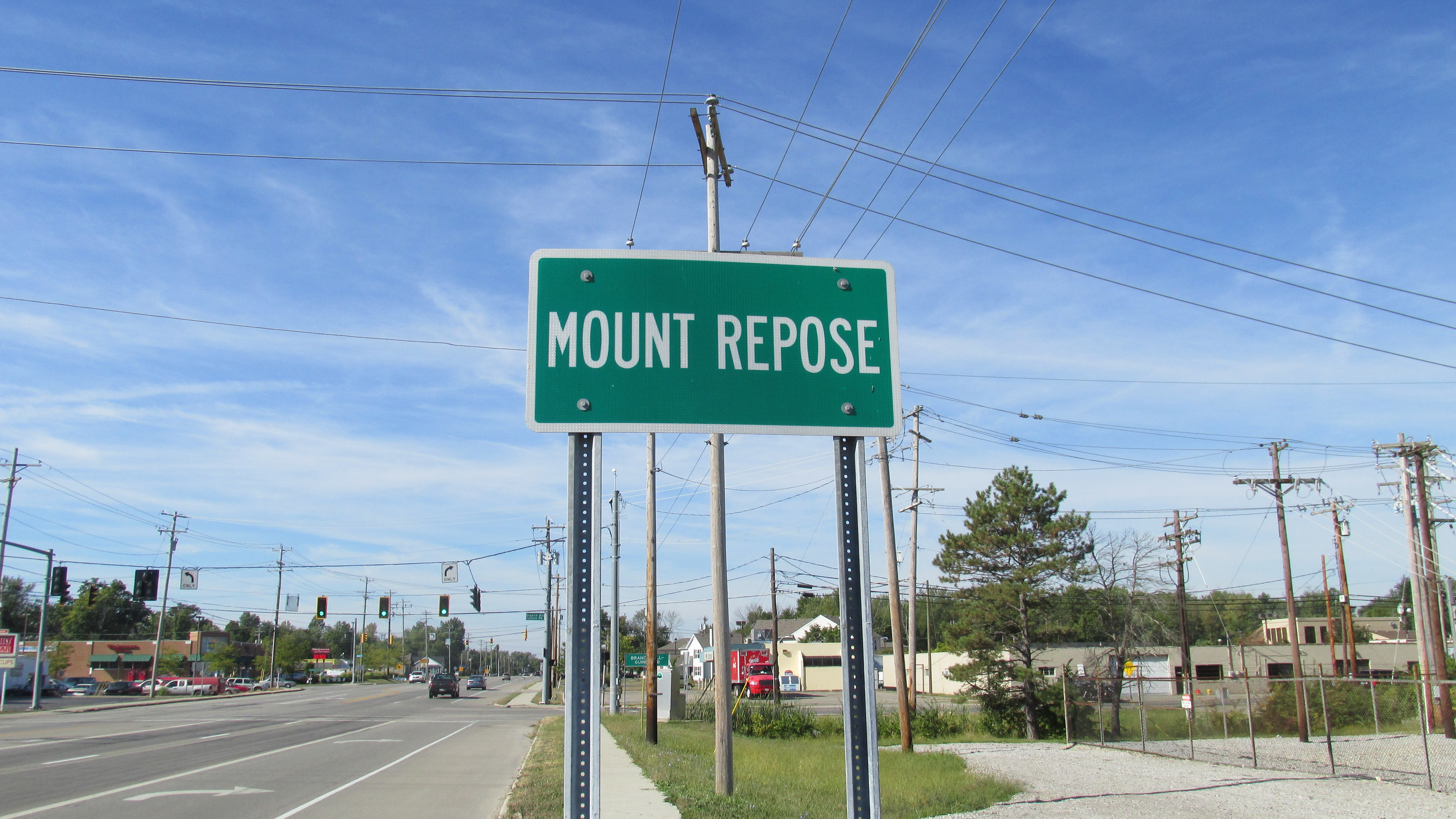
Mount Repose community sign

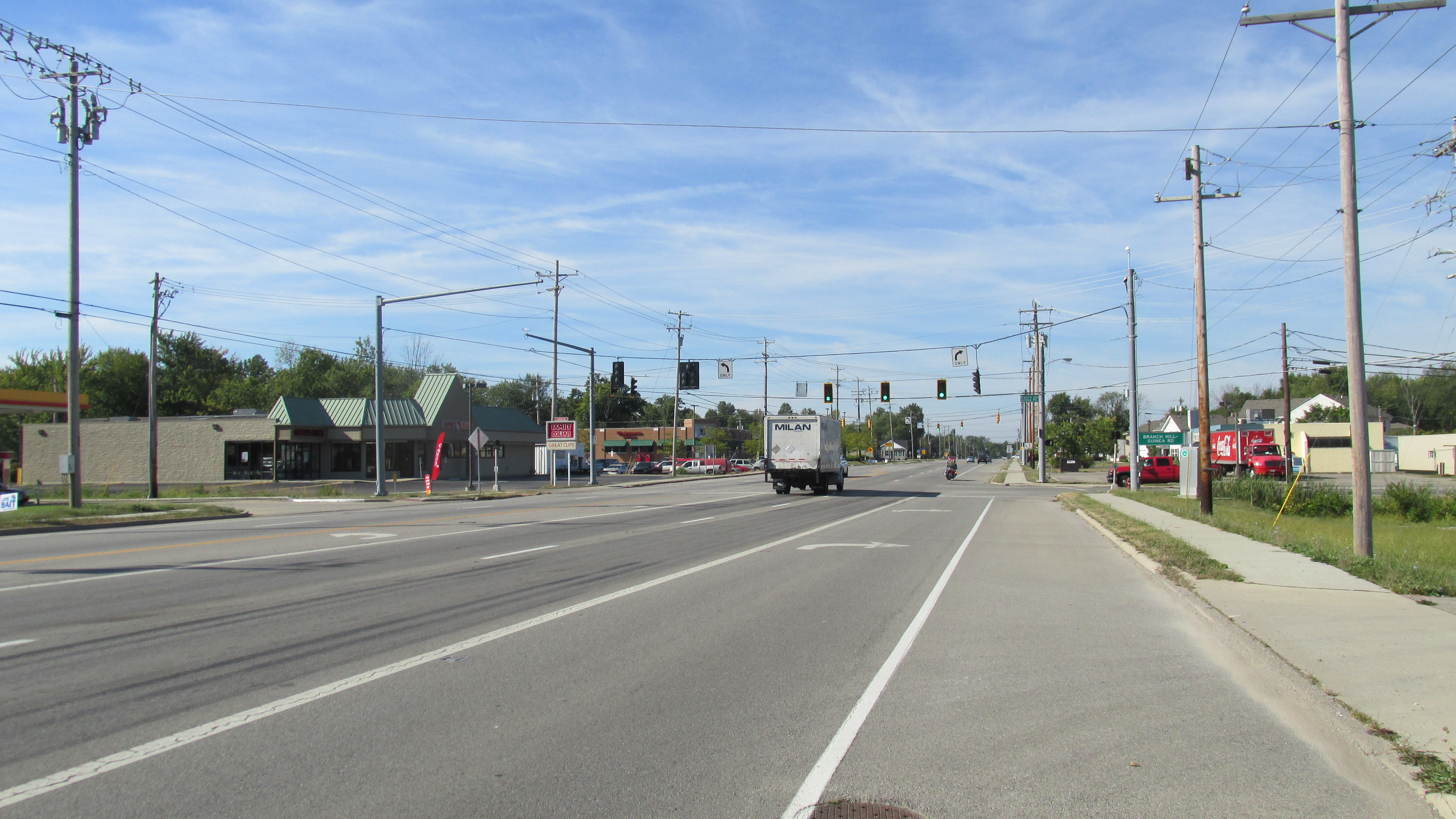
Looking west on Ohio Highway 28 in Mount Repose
