= Urban township (Ohio) =

Type of local government in Ohio, United States

Townships in red denote an urban township

An urban township is a designation of a unit of local government in Ohio as prescribed by chapter 504 of the Ohio Revised Code. Chapter 504 outlines the procedures for an Ohio civil township to adopt limited home rule government. At least 2,500 people are required to reside in unincorporated areas of a township for that township to adopt limited home rule government. If 15,000 or more people live in unincorporated areas of a township with a limited home rule government, that township is classed as an urban township under O.R.C. § 504.01(B).

== History ==
In 1991, the state legislature and George Voinovich adopted "Limited Home Rule Townships" as a schism from the Ohio Constitution's Municipal Home Rule established in 1912. The alteration devolved townships which chose limited home rule government to be similar to municipalities but without full home rule, a city code, comprehensive zoning, among a host of other traits. The result is many developed townships which would have sought shared municipal incorporation with cities or villages have not maximized property value and do not have basic support for services and infrastructure, relying exclusively on reduced state funding—much of which comes from federal investments for roadwork. The autonomy which was sought has effectively been unable to reserve responsibility for the community and instead outsourced that responsibility to state intervention.

== List of urban townships by population ==
All populations are those of the 2010 United States census.

Name	Population	County
Anderson	43,968	Hamilton
Ashtabula	20,941	Ashtabula
Athens	30,473	Athens
Austintown	36,722	Mahoning
Batavia	23,280	Clermont
Bethel	18,523	Clark
Boardman	40,899	Mahoning
Clearcreek	20,974	Warren
Clinton	20,903	Shelby
Concord	18,201	Lake
Deerfield	38,217	Warren
Delhi	29,510	Hamilton
Fairfield	21,373	Butler
Franklin	27,294	Warren
Hamilton	25,962	Warren
Harrison	22,397	Montgomery
Howland	18,301	Trumbull
Jackson	37,484	Stark
Lake	23,718	Stark
Liberty	37,259	Butler
Liberty	20,926	Trumbull
Madison	18,889	Lake
Marion	44,749	Marion
Miami	40,848	Clermont
Miami	50,735	Montgomery
Oxford	23,661	Butler
Painesville	20,399	Lake
Paris	23,645	Union
Perry	28,328	Stark
Plain	52,501	Stark
Prairie	16,498	Franklin
Sciota	27,735	Ross
Springfield	26,193	Lucas
Springfield	36,319	Hamilton
Sycamore	19,200	Hamilton
Sylvania	48,487	Lucas
Union	46,416	Clermont
Upper	15,418	Lawrence
Violet	38,572	Fairfield
Washington	56,607	Montgomery
Weathersfield	27,717	Trumbull
West Chester	60,958	Butler

Other townships include:

- American Township, Allen County, Ohio
- Cambridge Township, Guernsey County, Ohio
- Delaware Township, Delaware County, Ohio
- Perry Township, Columbiana County, Ohio
- Perry Township, Franklin County, Ohio
- Sycamore Township, Hamilton County, Ohio
