= Bolindale, Ohio =

- Census-designated place
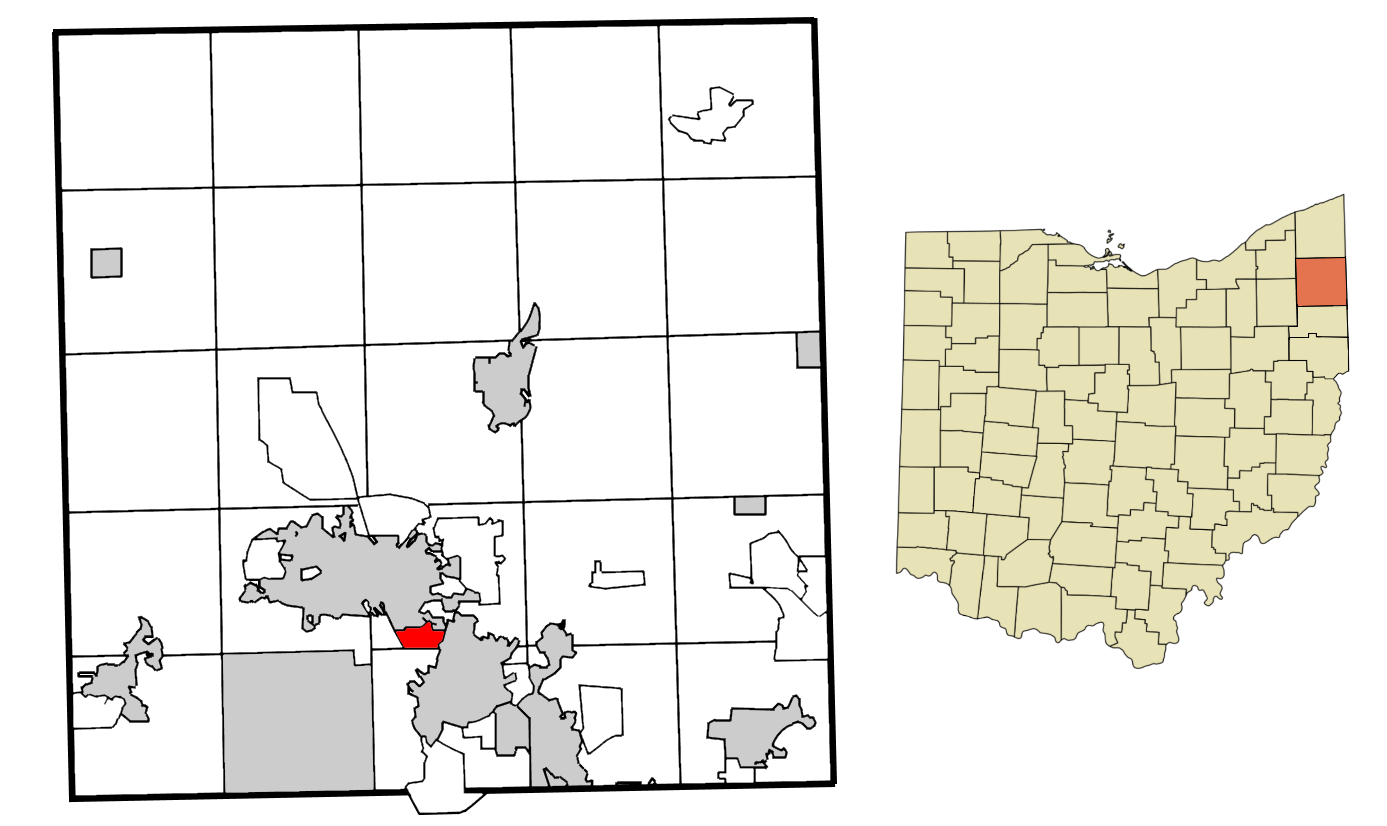
- Location of Bolindale in Trumbull County, Ohio.
- Coordinates: 41°12′32″N 80°46′42″W
- Country: United States
- State: Ohio
- County: Trumbull
- Township: Howland

Area
  - Total: 0.98 sq mi (2.55 km^{2})
  - Land: 0.98 sq mi (2.55 km^{2})
  - Water: 0 sq mi (0.00 km^{2})
- Elevation: 961 ft (293 m)

Population (2020)
  - Total: 1,921
  - Density: 1,953/sq mi (754.2/km^{2})
- Time zone: UTC-5 (Eastern (EST))
  - Summer (DST): UTC-4 (EDT)
- FIPS code: 39-07583
- GNIS feature ID: 2393343

Bolindale is an unincorporated community and census-designated place in southern Howland Township, Trumbull County, Ohio, United States. The population was 1,921 at the 2020 census. It is part of the Youngstown–Warren metropolitan area.

== Geography ==
According to the United States Census Bureau, the CDP has a total area of 1.0 square mile (2.6 km^{2}), all land.

== Demographics ==
Historical population
Census	Pop.	Note	%±
2000	2,489		—
2010	2,089		−16.1%
2020	1,921		−8.0%
U.S. Decennial Census

As of the census of 2000, there were 2,489 people, 993 households, and 699 families residing in the CDP. The population density was 2,595.2 inhabitants per square mile (1,002.0/km^{2}). There were 1,033 housing units at an average density of 1,077.1 per square mile (415.9/km^{2}). The racial makeup of the CDP was 93.25% White, 4.94% African American, 0.08% Native American, 0.32% Asian, 0.36% from other races, and 1.04% from two or more races. Hispanic or Latino of any race were 1.29% of the population.

There were 993 households, out of which 29.7% had children under the age of 18 living with them, 51.6% were married couples living together, 13.4% had a female householder with no husband present, and 29.6% were non-families. 25.5% of all households were made up of individuals, and 9.5% had someone living alone who was 65 years of age or older. The average household size was 2.51 and the average family size was 3.01.

In the CDP the population was spread out, with 24.2% under the age of 18, 6.9% from 18 to 24, 28.5% from 25 to 44, 26.0% from 45 to 64, and 14.4% who were 65 years of age or older. The median age was 39 years. For every 100 females there were 93.5 males. For every 100 females age 18 and over, there were 89.8 males.

The median income for a household in the CDP was $35,347, and the median income for a family was $39,886. Males had a median income of $37,143 versus $23,393 for females. The per capita income for the CDP was $16,866. About 5.3% of families and 10.0% of the population were below the poverty line, including 5.8% of those under age 18 and 8.7% of those age 65 or over.
