= Lakeview High School (Ohio) =

Public high school located in Ohio U.S.

Coordinates: 41°19′12″N 80°43′33″W

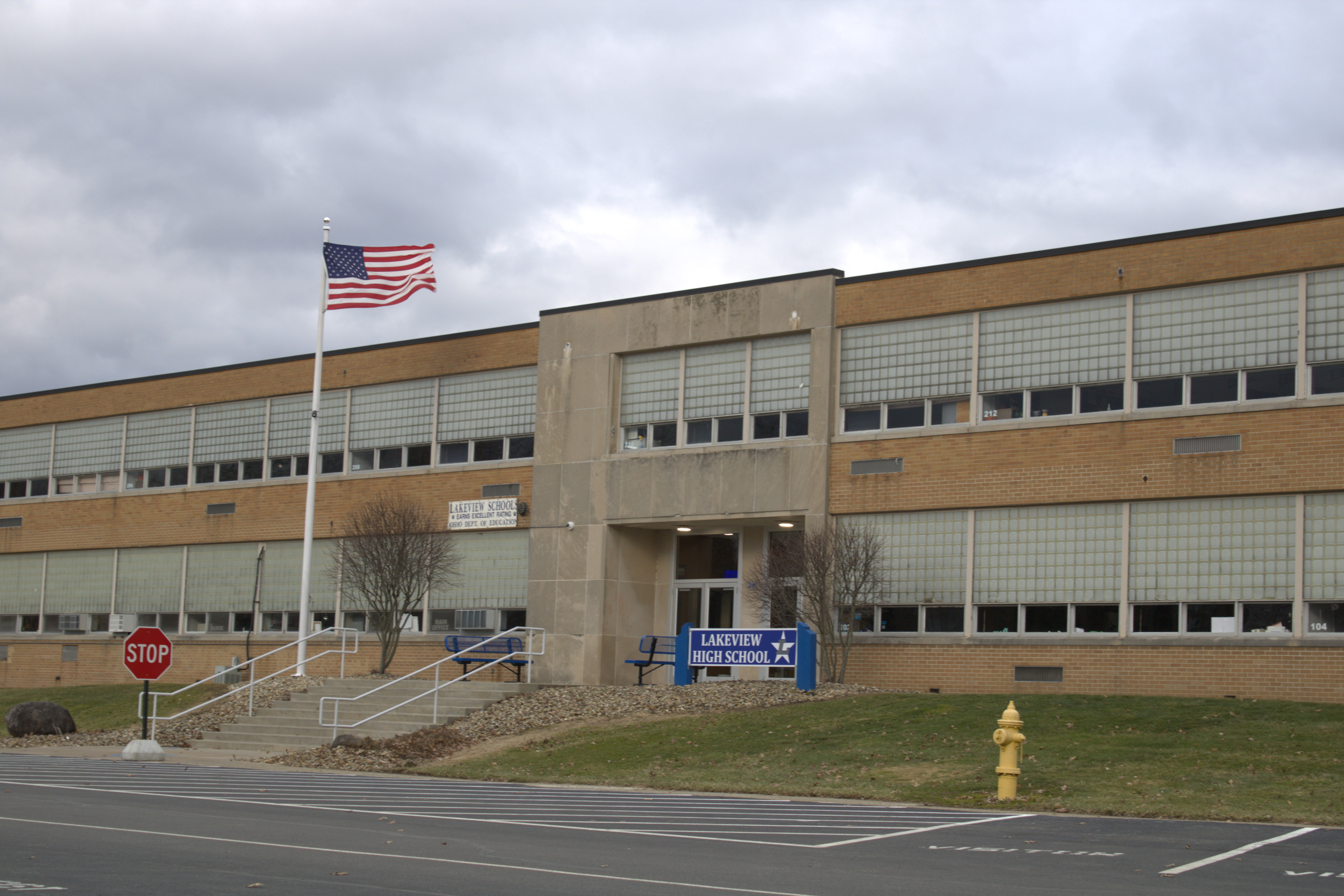

Location
- 300 Hillman Dr. Cortland, Trumbull County, Ohio 44410; United States

Information
- Established: 1961
- School district: Lakeview Local Schools
- NCES School ID: 390501803868
- Principal: Lawrence Herrholtz
- Teaching staff: 33.40 (FTE)
- Grades: 9th–12th
- Enrollment: 580 (2024–25)
- Student to teacher ratio: 17.37
- Colors: White and blue
- Mascot: Bulldogs
- Website: https://lhs.lakeviewlocal.org

Lakeview High School is a public high school located in Cortland, Ohio. It is the only high school in the Lakeview Local School District. Athletic teams are known as the Bulldogs, and they compete as a member of the Ohio High School Athletic Association in the Northeast 8 Athletic Conference.

== History ==
Lakeview High School opened in 1961, from the consolidation of Bazetta and Cortland High Schools.

Lakeview High School added a new gymnasium, cafeteria and band room in 1971, along with Raidel Auditorium in 1996.

Prior to 2010, the high school campus housed students grades 8–12, after the 2010 school year, 8th grade students were moved to the middle school building and again to the new K–8 campus following the 2018–19 school year.

== Academics ==
Lakeview High School offers four years of math, science, English, social studies, and foreign languages (Spanish and French). Lakeview also offers art, band, and choir as electives. AP (Advanced Placement) classes are taught in Calculus and English, with Honors classes Physics and Spanish IV. Computers, Business, and Accounting (Personal Finance) is integrated with humanities, and S.T.E.M. (Science, Technology, Engineering, and Math) will now be offered to 8th grade students.

== Athletics ==
Lakeview High School offers:

- Baseball
- Basketball
- Bowling
- Cheerleading
- Cross country
- Golf
- Football
- Soccer
- Softball
- Tennis
- Track and field
- Volleyball
- Wrestling

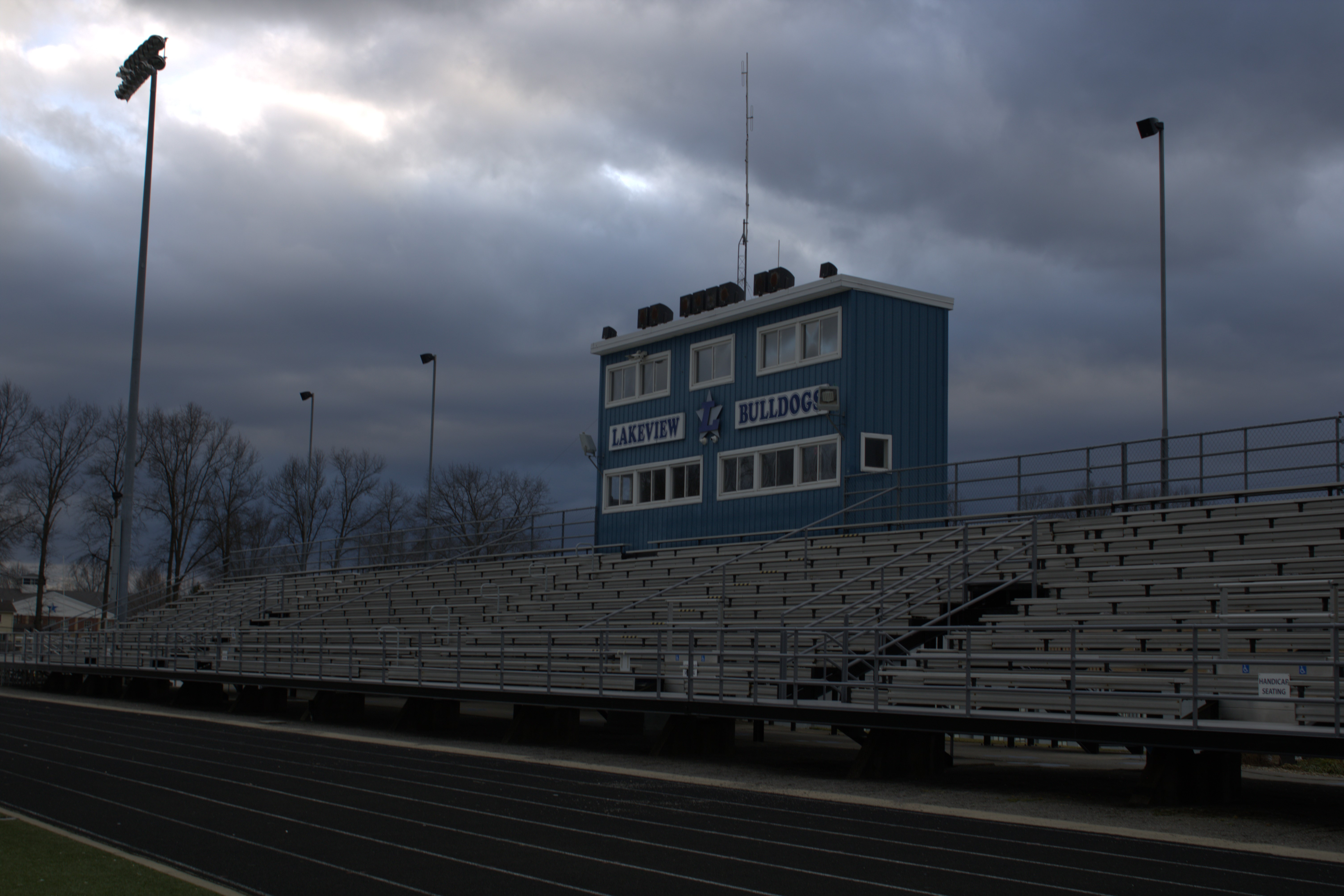
Don Richards Memorial Stadium

=== Facilities ===
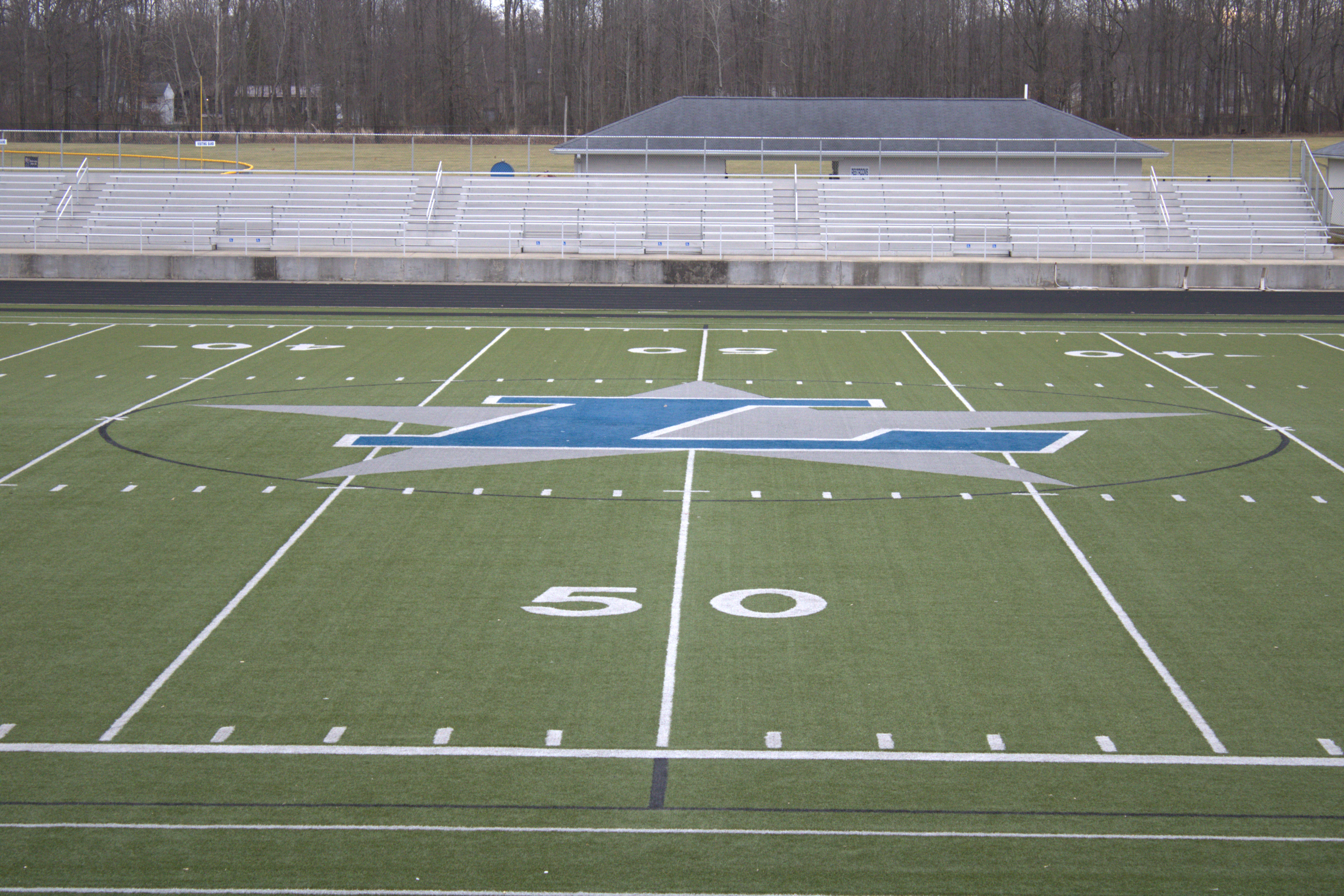
Lakeview "L" logo at midfield

==== Don Richards Memorial Stadium ====
Opened in 2017, Don Richards Memorial Stadium, located behind the high school campus seats roughly 3,450 spectators, and features a track around the field, making it a multi-purpose venue for high school football and track and field events. The field features an artificial turf surface, with the Lakeview "L" logo in the middle, an electronic scoreboard, and a band shell. The stadium is named after former Lakeview football player Don Richards, who passed away during a homecoming game in the 1969 season. The high school track was named after former educator Ernie Grekis in 2021 after his passing in 2019. Grekis was a former teacher and coach at Lakeview, retiring in 1996.

===== State championships =====
- Boys track and field – 1970
- Boys' cross country – 1967, 1968
- Girls' golf – 2015

== Notable alumni ==
- Eric Stocz - former professional football player
- Johnny Ace Palmer - magician
