= Warren Township, Trumbull County, Ohio =

Township in Ohio, US

- Township
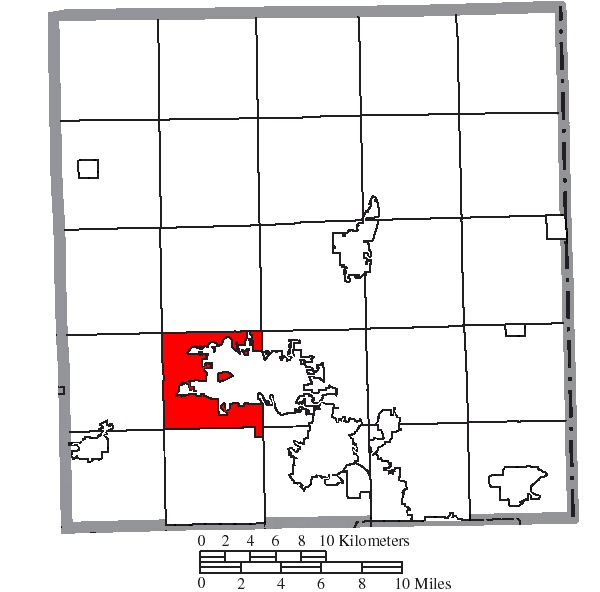
- Location of Warren Township in Trumbull County
- Coordinates: 41°14′23″N 80°51′55″W
- Country: United States
- State: Ohio
- County: Trumbull

Area
  - Total: 14.6 sq mi (37.7 km^{2})
  - Land: 14.4 sq mi (37.3 km^{2})
  - Water: 0.12 sq mi (0.3 km^{2})
- Elevation: 892 ft (272 m)

Population (2020)
  - Total: 4,744
  - Density: 329/sq mi (127.2/km^{2})
- Time zone: UTC-5 (Eastern (EST))
  - Summer (DST): UTC-4 (EDT)
- ZIP codes: 44481-44488
- Area codes: 234/330
- FIPS code: 39-80906
- GNIS feature ID: 1087047
- Website: https://www.warrentwptrumbull.gov/

Warren Township is one of the twenty-four townships of Trumbull County, Ohio, United States. The 2020 census found 4,744 people in the township.

== Geography ==
Warren Township is located at 41°14'18" North, 80°48'52" West (41.238206, -80.814554). Located in the southwestern part of the county, it borders the following townships and village:

- Champion Township - north
- Bazetta Township - northeast corner
- Howland Township - east
- Weathersfield Township - southeast
- Lordstown - south
- Newton Township - southwest corner
- Braceville Township - west
- Southington Township - northwest corner

A significant part of the city of Warren, the county seat of Trumbull County, is located in eastern Warren Township, and the census-designated place of Leavittsburg is located in the township's west.

== Name and history ==
It is one of five Warren Townships statewide.

== Government ==
The township is governed by a three-member board of trustees, who are elected in November of odd-numbered years to a four-year term beginning on the following January 1. Two are elected in the year after the presidential election and one is elected in the year before it. There is also an elected township fiscal officer, who serves a four-year term beginning on April 1 of the year after the election, which is held in November of the year before the presidential election. Vacancies in the fiscal officership or on the board of trustees are filled by the remaining trustees.
