= Howland Township, Ohio =

Township in Ohio, US

Howland Township
- Township
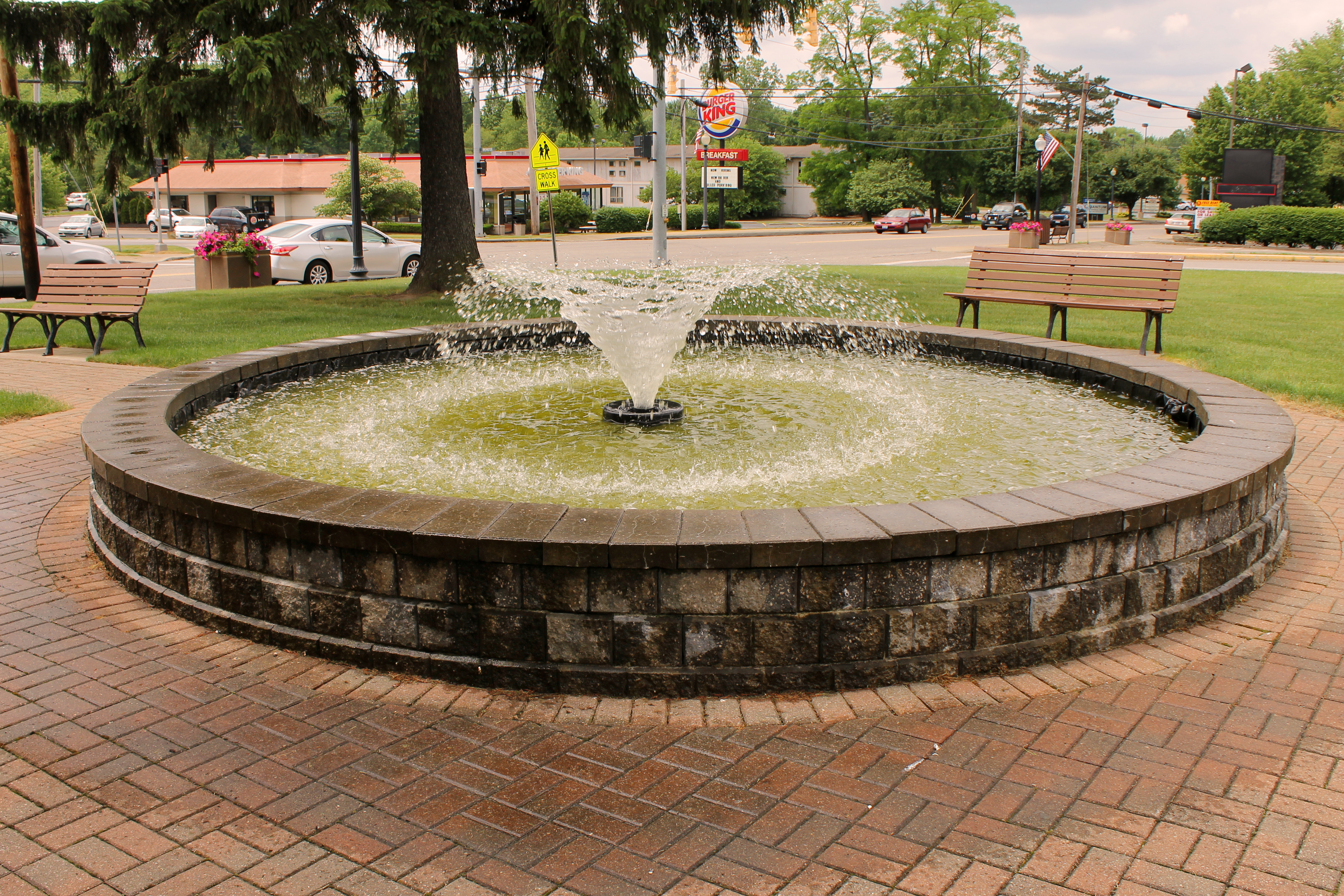
- Fountain in Richard E. Orwig Park

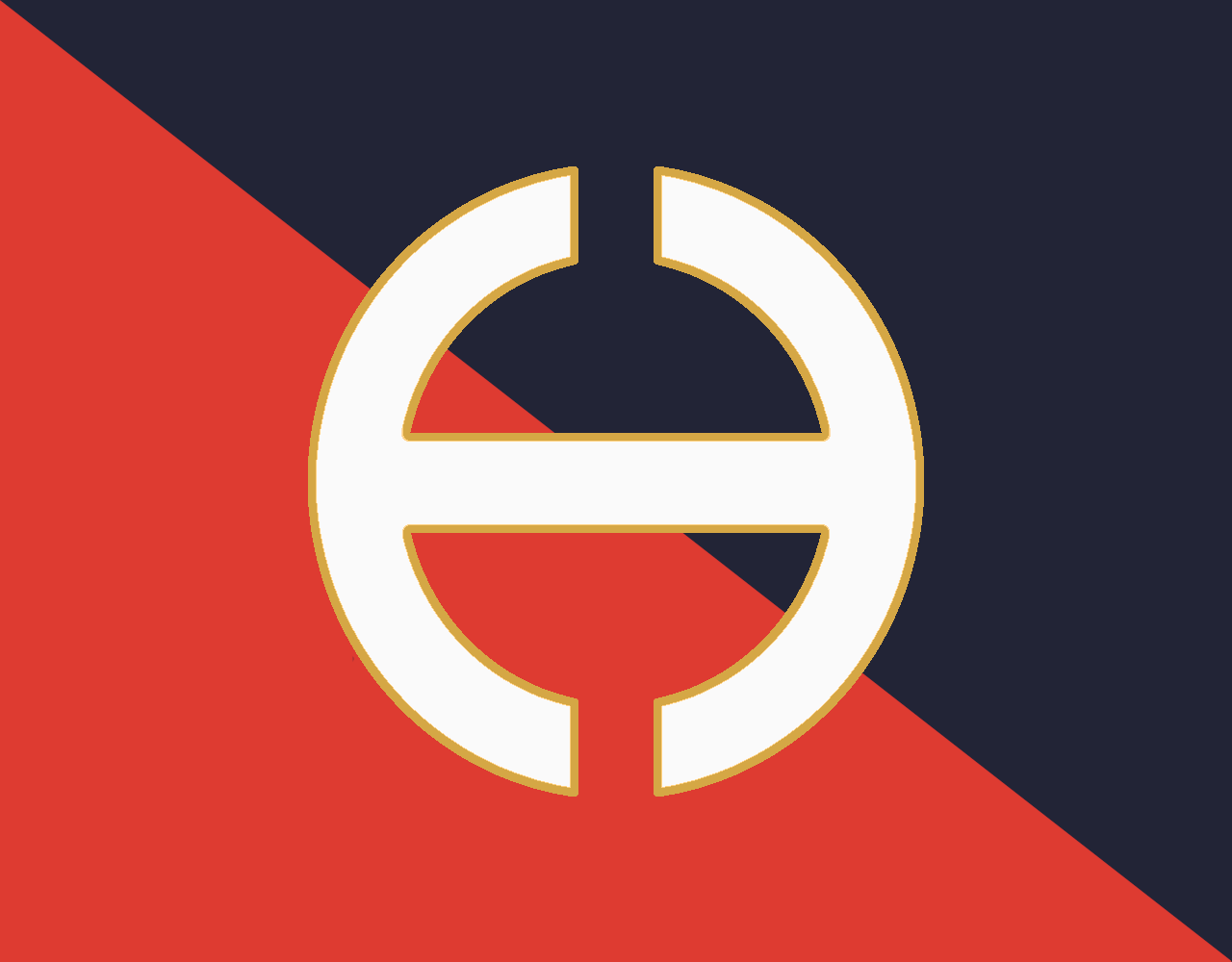
- Flag

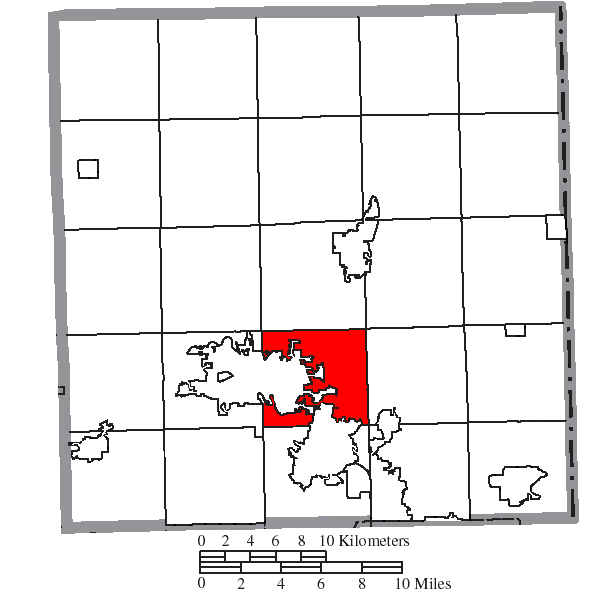
- Location of Howland Township in Trumbull County
- Coordinates: 41°14′8″N 80°45′29″W
- Country: United States
- State: Ohio
- County: Trumbull

Area
  - Total: 17.7 sq mi (45.8 km^{2})
  - Land: 17.7 sq mi (45.8 km^{2})
  - Water: 0 sq mi (0.0 km^{2})
- Elevation: 869 ft (265 m)

Population (2020)
  - Total: 19,042
  - Density: 1,080/sq mi (416/km^{2})
- Time zone: UTC-5 (Eastern (EST))
  - Summer (DST): UTC-4 (EDT)
- ZIP code: 44484
- Area codes: 234/330
- FIPS code: 39-36554
- GNIS feature ID: 1087033

Howland Township is one of the twenty-four townships of Trumbull County, Ohio, United States. Along with Liberty Township, it is one of two urban townships in Trumbull County. The 2020 census found 19,042 people in the township.

== Name and history ==
It is the only Howland Township statewide. The township is named for the Howland family, who were the original settlers of the township, as well as Pilgrims aboard the Mayflower 165 years earlier.

In 1620, John Howland landed in Plymouth, Massachusetts aboard the Mayflower. A descendant of his, Joseph Howland, purchased the township from the Connecticut Land Company in 1795. The first settler arrived in 1799, and the township was organized in 1812. A sawmill was constructed in Howland in 1814, with a gristmill constructed the following year. Circa 1830, Howland Springs began operation as a health spa; it operated in the township until it burned in 1882. The Howland Local School District was formed in 1917 from the consolidation of five one-room schools. The township was sparsely populated until 1953, when the Clifton-Hyde housing development was built. The township has seen sustained growth since that time, as the nearby cities of Warren and Youngstown have suburbanized the township.

== Geography ==
Located in the southern part of the county, it borders the following townships:

- Bazetta Township - north
- Fowler Township - northeast corner
- Vienna Township - east
- Liberty Township - southeast corner
- Weathersfield Township - south
- Warren Township - west
- Champion Township - northwest corner

Several populated places are located in Howland Township:

- Part of the city of Niles, in the south
- Part of the city of Warren, the county seat of Trumbull County, in the west
- The census-designated place of Bolindale, in the southwest
- The census-designated place of Howland Center, in the north

According to the United States Census Bureau, the township has a total area of 18.0 square miles (47 km^{2}), all of it land.

== Demographics ==
As of the census of 2000, there were 19,451 people, 7,916 households, and 5,661 families residing in the township. The population density was 1,080 inhabitants per square mile (420/km^{2}). There were 8,324 housing units at an average density of 462 units per square mile (178 units/km^{2}). The racial makeup of the township was 88.36% White, 10.09% African American, 0.47% Native American, 1.67% Asian, 0.02% Pacific Islander, 0.17% from other races, and 0.40% from two or more races. Hispanic or Latino of any race were 0.90% of the population.

There were 7,916 households, out of which 28.27% had children under the age of 18 living with them, 59.06% were married couples living together, 9.34% had a female householder with no husband present, and 28.49% were non-families. 25.49% of all households were made up of individuals, and 9.79% had someone living alone who was 65 years of age or older. The average household size was 2.45 and the average family size was 2.94.

In the township the population was spread out, with 22.43% under the age of 18, 6.27% from 18 to 24, 25.98% from 25 to 44, 28.80% from 45 to 64, and 16.52% who were 65 years of age or older. The median age was 42.3 years. For every 100 females there were 95.6 males. For every 100 females age 18 and over, there were 90.5 males.

The median income for a household in the township was $48,763, and the median income for a family was $58,352. Males had a median income of $43,783 versus $28,207 for females. The per capita income for the township was $24,056. About 1.2% of families and 2.0% of the population were below the poverty line, including 0.8% of those under age 18 and 5.5% of those age 65 or over.

== Government ==
The township is governed by a three-member board of trustees, who are elected in November of odd-numbered years to a four-year term beginning on the following January 1. Two are elected in the year after the presidential election and one is elected in the year before it. There is also an elected township fiscal officer, who serves a four-year term beginning on April 1 of the year after the election, which is held in November of the year before the presidential election. Vacancies in the fiscal officership or on the board of trustees are filled by the remaining trustees.

== Education ==
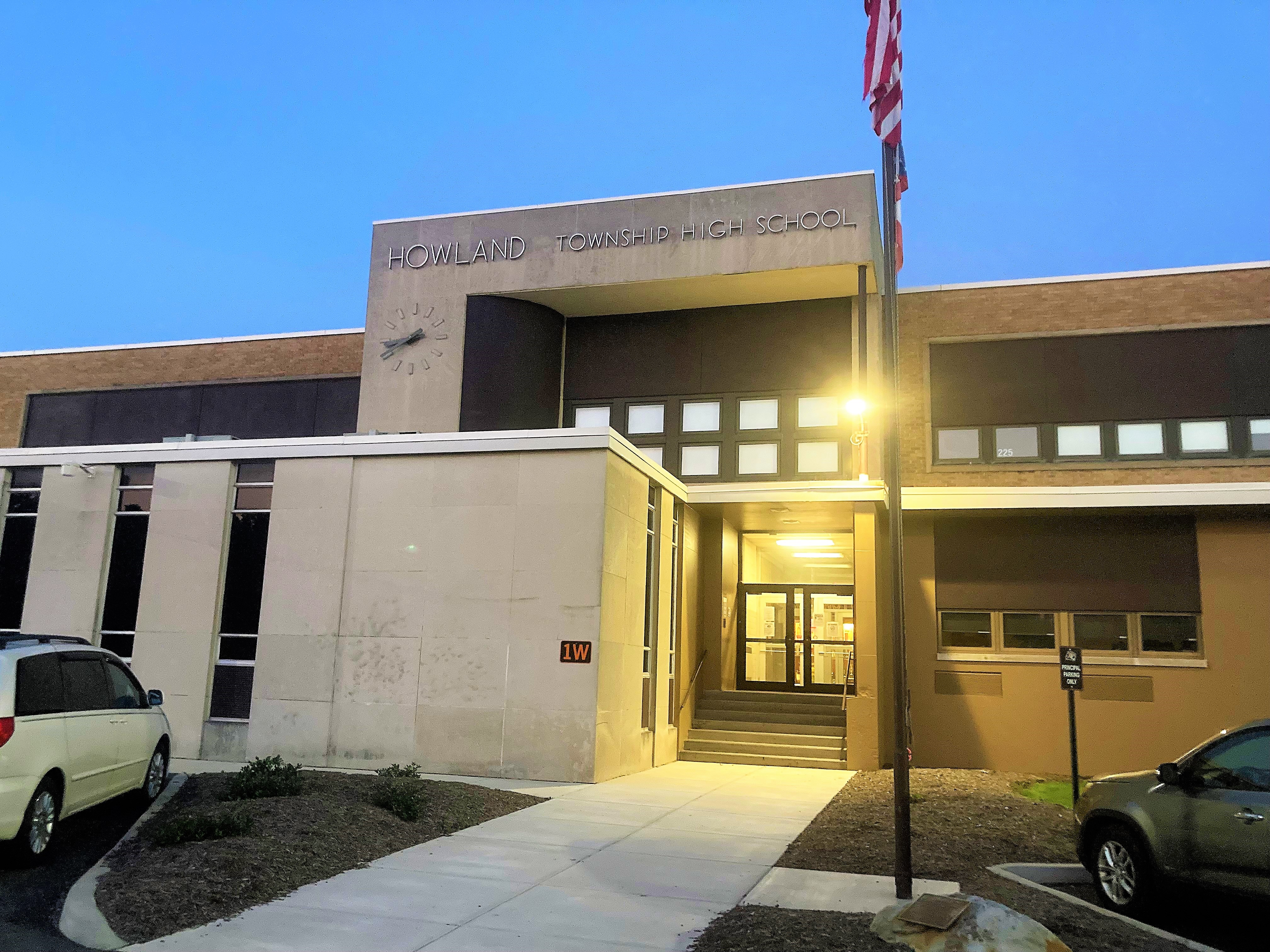
Howland High School

Howland is served by the public Howland Local School District, which includes Howland Springs Elementary School (grades PK–K), Howland Glen Elementary School (grades 1–2), Mines Elementary School (grades 3–4), Howland Intermediate School (grades 5–6), Howland Junior High School (grades 7-8) and Howland High School (grades 9–12).
