= Mosquito Lake State Park =

State park in Ohio, United States

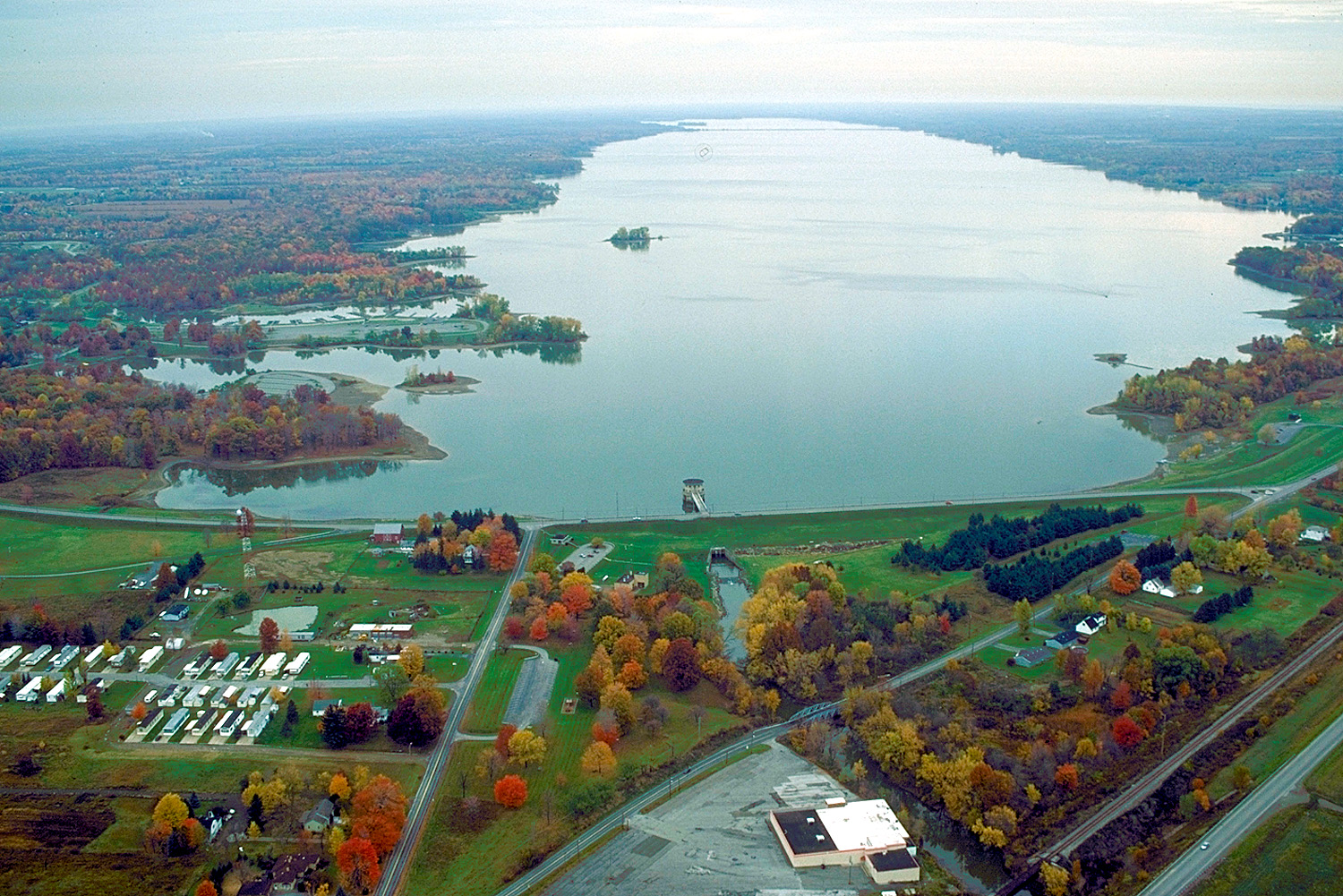
- Mosquito Creek Lake

- Location within Ohio Location within the United States
- Location: Trumbull County, Ohio, US
- Nearest city: Cortland, Ohio
- Coordinates: 41.34274°N 80.75552°W
- Area: 6,601.13 acres (2,671.38 ha) (land and water); 3,278 acres (1,327 ha) (land)
- Administrator: Ohio Department of Natural Resources
- Designation: Ohio state park
- Website: ohiodnr.gov/go-and-do/plan-a-visit/find-a-property/mosquito-lake-state-park

Mosquito Lake State Park is a 6,601.13-acre (2,671.38 ha) state park in Trumbull County, Ohio, United States. The park surrounds the southern half of Mosquito Creek Lake. The United States Army Corps of Engineers leases the lake and most of the surrounding land to the Ohio Department of Natural Resources.

== History ==
Initial plans for Mosquito Creek Reservoir were developed in the 1930s. The reservoir was authorized by the Flood Control Act of 1938 and it was constructed as a means for flood control and the regulation of streamflow. Construction of the dam that created the lake was completed by the U.S. Army Corps of Engineers in April 1944. The reservoir provides flood protection for the upper Ohio River, Beaver River and the Mahoning River valley. Additional benefits contemplated were reduction in pollution from local steel processing, and the provision of a water supply for the city of Warren. In 1971, the Board on Geographic Names Decisions officially changed the name from Mosquito Creek Reservoir to Mosquito Creek Lake.

In 2021, state representative Mike Loychik introduced a bill to rename the park for Donald Trump at a cost of $300,000, equivalent to $341,628 in 2024. As of July 2024, the bill was referred to committee.

== Recreation ==
The park is operated by the Ohio Department of Natural Resources. There are picnicking and camping, as well as designated hiking trails. Opportunities for water recreation are provided, including dock rentals, boat ramps, and various watercraft rentals. Fishing for flathead catfish is highly recommended at the location. Other species recreationally fished in the lake are bluegill, channel catfish, crappie, largemouth bass, northern pike, ring perch, and walleye.
