= Mosquito Creek Lake =

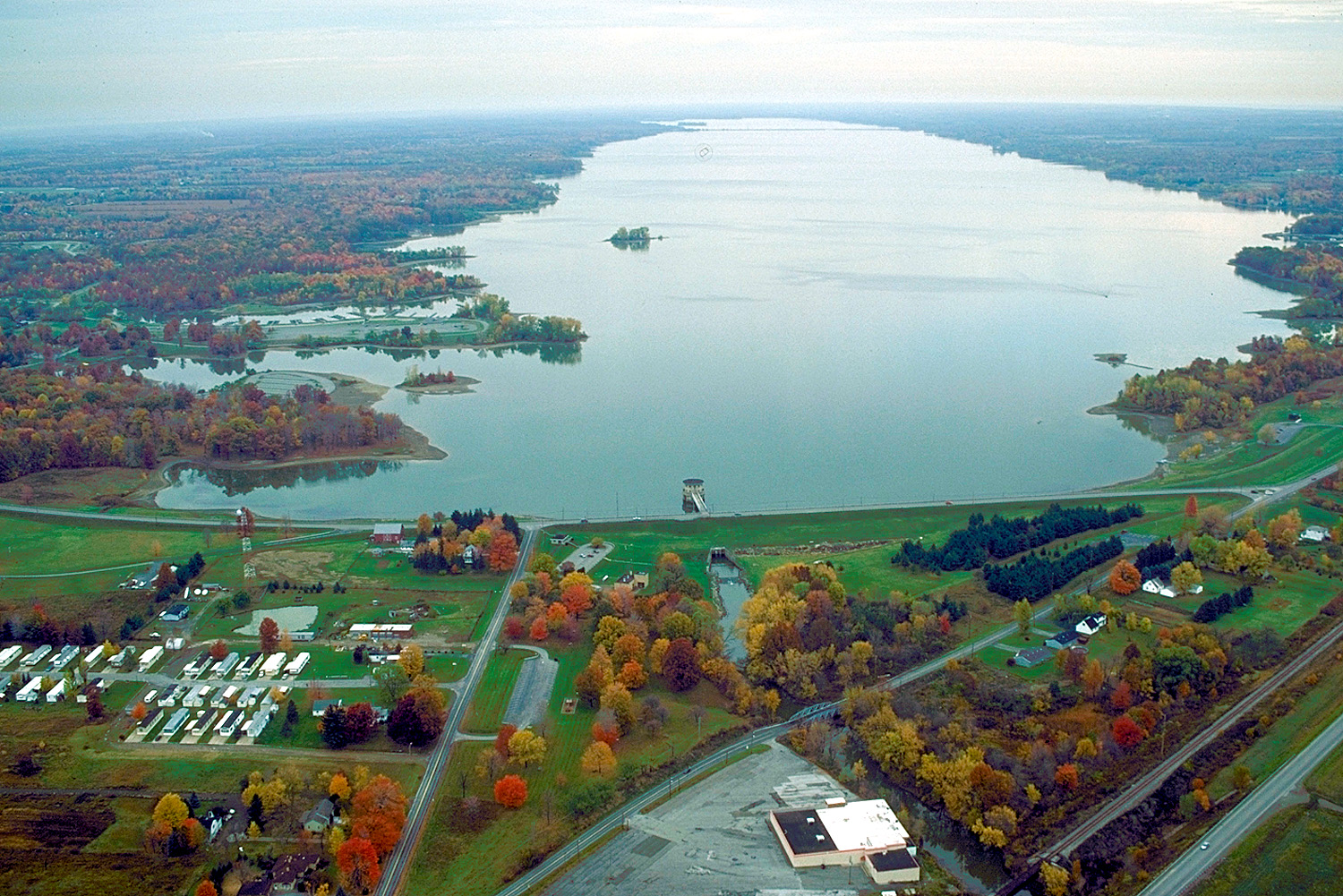

- Location within Ohio
- Location: Trumbull County, Ohio, US
- Coordinates: 41°22′16″N 80°45′18″W
- Type: Reservoir
- Primary inflows: Mosquito Creek
- Primary outflows: Mosquito Creek
- Basin countries: United States
- Max. length: 9.5 mi (15.3 km)
- Max. width: 0.75 mi (1.21 km)
- Surface area: 7,850 acres (3,180 ha)
- Max. depth: 25 ft (7.6 m)
- Surface elevation: 899 ft (274 m)

Mosquito Creek Lake (formerly Mosquito Creek Reservoir) is a reservoir in Trumbull County, Ohio, United States. The lake is fed by Mosquito Creek and Walnut Creek. The southern portion of the lake is included in Mosquito Lake State Park, and the city of Cortland is just off its eastern shore. Construction of the lake was completed in 1944.

== Description ==
Mosquito Creek Lake is a man-made reservoir. It is the second-largest inland lake in Ohio. Depth averages 8 to 15 feet (2.4 to 4.6 m) (depending on season), but the southern end towards the dam averages 20 to 25 feet (6.1 to 7.6 m). The northern end is considerably more shallow, with depths averaging only 4 to 10 feet (1.2 to 3.0 m). Surrounding the lake's southern end is Mosquito Lake State Park, and it is bisected by the Ohio State Route 88 causeway. The drainage area for lake is 97.4 square miles (252 km^{2}). It is approximately 6 miles (9.7 km) northeast of Warren.

== History ==
Initial plans for Mosquito Creek Reservoir were developed in the 1930s. The reservoir was authorized by the Flood Control Act of 1938 and it was constructed as a means for flood control and the regulation of streamflow. Construction of the dam that created the lake was completed by the U.S. Army Corps of Engineers in April 1944. The reservoir provides flood protection for the upper Ohio River, Beaver River and the Mahoning River valley. Additional benefits contemplated were reduction in pollution from local steel processing, and the provision of a water supply for the city of Warren. In 1971, the Board on Geographic Names Decisions officially changed the name from Mosquito Creek Reservoir to Mosquito Creek Lake.

== Recreation ==
The lake is surrounded by Mosquito Lake State Park, operated by the Ohio Department of Natural Resources. There are picnicking and camping, as well as designated hiking trails. Opportunities for water recreation are provided, including dock rentals, boat ramps, and various watercraft rentals. Fishing for flathead catfish is highly recommended at the location. Other species recreationally fished in the lake are bluegill, channel catfish, crappie, largemouth bass, northern pike, ring perch, and walleye.

== Ecological issues ==
The north part of the lake is a designated refuge for waterfowl. Boating and fishing are prohibited in these areas. There has been concern that the invasive Asian carp will reach Lake Erie via Mosquito Creek Reservoir, but the probability of this has been deemed low. Invasive Zebra mussels have proliferated in the lake. This causes the lake's water to be clearer than normal, and subsequently, water-plants are able to thrive in the ecosystem. Soon after construction, the lake's water was considered among the best in the area, but man-made pollution from nearby residential areas has been a concern.
