= Cortland, Ohio =

- City
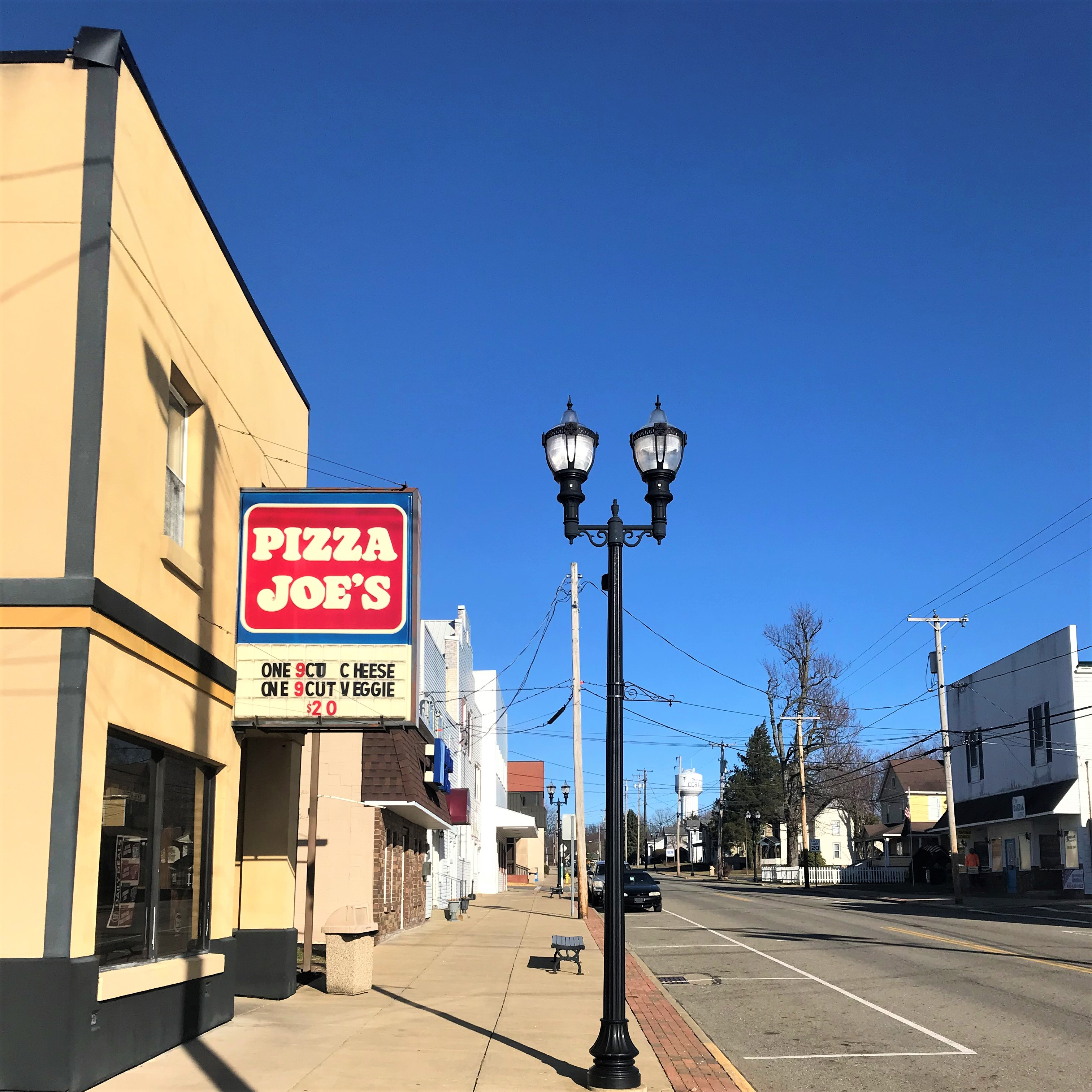
- Downtown Cortland
- Interactive map of Cortland, Ohio
- Location within Ohio Location within the United States
- Coordinates: 41°19′56″N 80°43′10″W
- Country: United States
- State: Ohio
- County: Trumbull
- Incorporated: 1873
- Named after: Cortland, New York

Government
  - Mayor: Deidre Petrosky

Area
  - Total: 4.33 sq mi (11.22 km^{2})
  - Land: 4.33 sq mi (11.22 km^{2})
  - Water: 0 sq mi (0.00 km^{2})
- Elevation: 1,037 ft (316 m)

Population (2020)
  - Total: 7,105
  - Estimate (2023): 7,062
  - Density: 1,641/sq mi (633.5/km^{2})
- Time zone: UTC-5 (EST)
  - Summer (DST): UTC-4 (EDT)
- ZIP code: 44410
- Area codes: 330, 234
- FIPS code: 39-18812
- GNIS feature ID: 2393640
- Website: http://www.cityofcortland.org

Cortland is a city in Trumbull County, Ohio, United States. The population was 7,105 at the 2020 census. It lies on the eastern shore of Mosquito Creek Lake and is part of the Youngstown–Warren metropolitan area.

== History ==
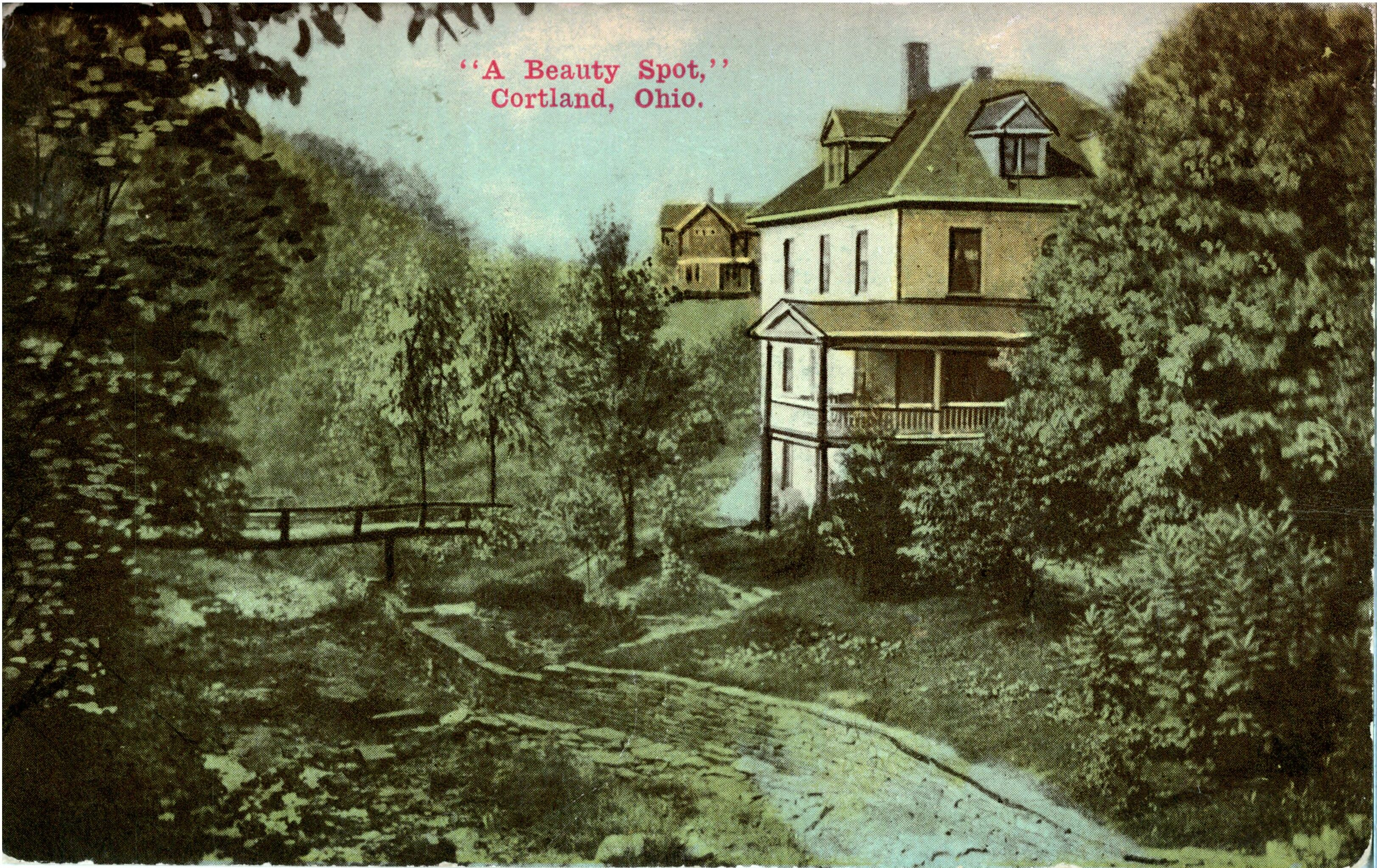
Postcard titled "A Beauty Spot" of Cortland, Ohio (1911)

Samuel Bacon established a settlement in what is now Cortland by acquiring land along the Mahoning River in 1807. In 1816, he traded this land for a lumber mill. The mill relied on a dam built in 1809, but it was limited to spring use due to water levels. As the area developed, J.H. Post and H.G. Scovill built a larger dam that powered a custom and planning mill and grist mill. The area became known as Baconsburg in the 19th century.

Minister Orrin Gates, who was from Cortland, New York, helped convert the area's oldest church into a Disciple Church in 1832. Baconsburg officially incorporated as the village of Cortland in 1873, named after the city in New York. The village grew, with a new town hall built in 1874 and later replaced in 1986. The Methodist Episcopal Church was organized in 1820, a cheese factory opened in 1875, and the Union School was constructed in 1877.

In 1981, Cortland officially became a city after its population surpassed 5,000 and later adopted a charter government.

== Geography ==
According to the United States Census Bureau, the city has a total area of 4.25 square miles (11.01 km^{2}), all land. It lies along the eastern shore of Mosquito Creek Lake and the accompanying Mosquito Lake State Park. Cortland is 19 miles (31 km) north of Youngstown.

== Demographics ==
Historical population
Census	Pop.	Note	%±
1880	616		—
1890	697		13.1%
1900	620		−11.0%
1910	612		−1.3%
1920	750		22.5%
1930	940		25.3%
1940	1,014		7.9%
1950	1,259		24.2%
1960	1,957		55.4%
1970	2,525		29.0%
1980	5,011		98.5%
1990	5,666		13.1%
2000	6,830		20.5%
2010	7,104		4.0%
2020	7,105		0.0%
2023 (est.)	7,062		−0.6%

=== 2020 census ===
As of the 2020 census, Cortland had a population of 7,105. The median age was 47.2 years. 20.0% of residents were under the age of 18 and 26.3% of residents were 65 years of age or older. For every 100 females there were 89.9 males, and for every 100 females age 18 and over there were 86.5 males age 18 and over.

98.1% of residents lived in urban areas, while 1.9% lived in rural areas.

There were 3,107 households in Cortland, of which 25.9% had children under the age of 18 living in them. Of all households, 49.3% were married-couple households, 15.3% were households with a male householder and no spouse or partner present, and 29.4% were households with a female householder and no spouse or partner present. About 31.4% of all households were made up of individuals and 18.3% had someone living alone who was 65 years of age or older.

There were 3,276 housing units, of which 5.2% were vacant. The homeowner vacancy rate was 0.7% and the rental vacancy rate was 5.8%.

Racial composition as of the 2020 census
Race	Number	Percent
White	6,639	93.4%
Black or African American	101	1.4%
American Indian and Alaska Native	11	0.2%
Asian	52	0.7%
Native Hawaiian and Other Pacific Islander	0	0.0%
Some other race	34	0.5%
Two or more races	268	3.8%
Hispanic or Latino (of any race)	128	1.8%

=== 2010 census ===
As of the census of 2010, there were 7,104 people, 3,010 households, and 2,032 families living in the city. The population density was 1,671.5 inhabitants per square mile (645.4/km^{2}). There were 3,211 housing units at an average density of 755.5 per square mile (291.7/km^{2}). The racial makeup of the city was 97.0% White, 1.2% African American, 0.2% Native American, 0.5% Asian, 0.2% from other races, and 0.9% from two or more races. Hispanic or Latino of any race were 0.9% of the population.

There were 3,010 households, of which 29.2% had children under the age of 18 living with them, 54.3% were married couples living together, 9.6% had a female householder with no husband present, 3.7% had a male householder with no wife present, and 32.5% were non-families. 28.6% of all households were made up of individuals, and 14.4% had someone living alone who was 65 years of age or older. The average household size was 2.33 and the average family size was 2.86.

The median age in the city was 44.4 years. 22% of residents were under the age of 18; 6.4% were between the ages of 18 and 24; 22.3% were from 25 to 44; 30.7% were from 45 to 64; and 18.6% were 65 years of age or older. The gender makeup of the city was 47.0% male and 53.0% female.

=== 2000 census ===
As of 2000, there were 6,830 people, 2,738 households, and 1,968 families living in the city. The population density was 1,524.8 inhabitants per square mile (588.7/km^{2}). There were 2,899 housing units at an average density of 647.2 per square mile (249.9/km^{2}). The racial makeup of the city was 97.61% White, 0.94% African American, 0.12% Native American, 0.38% Asian, 0.12% from other races, and 0.83% from two or more races. Hispanic or Latino of any race were 0.75% of the population.

There were 2,738 households, out of which 32.6% had children under the age of 18 living with them, 59.5% were married couples living together, 10.0% had a female householder with no husband present, and 28.1% were non-families. 24.3% of all households were made up of individuals, and 10.6% had someone living alone who was 65 years of age or older. The average household size was 2.48 and the average family size was 2.97.

In the city the population was spread out, with 24.6% under the age of 18, 7.4% from 18 to 24, 26.5% from 25 to 44, 27.9% from 45 to 64, and 13.5% who were 65 years of age or older. The median age was 40 years. For every 100 females, there were 90.0 males. For every 100 females age 18 and over, there were 85.5 males.

The median income for a household in the city was $50,941 and the median income for a family was $62,441. Males had a median income of $50,739 versus $28,320 for females. The per capita income for the city was $22,972. About 4.6% of families and 5.3% of the population were below the poverty line, including 6.3% of those under age 18 and 3.0% of those age 65 or over.

== Education ==
Lakeview Local Schools operates one Pk-8 Building and one high school (Lakeview High School). A few residences within the easternmost portions of the city of Cortland, closest to SR-11, are zoned for the Mathews Local School District. Residences north of Bradley Brownlee Road are in the Maplewood Local School District.

Cortland has a public library, a branch of the Warren-Trumbull County Public Library.

== Transportation ==
The following highways pass through Cortland:

- State Route 5
- State Route 46

== Notable people ==
- Johnny Ace Palmer, magician
- Eric Stocz, former NFL player
