= Bolton, Ohio =

- Census-designated place
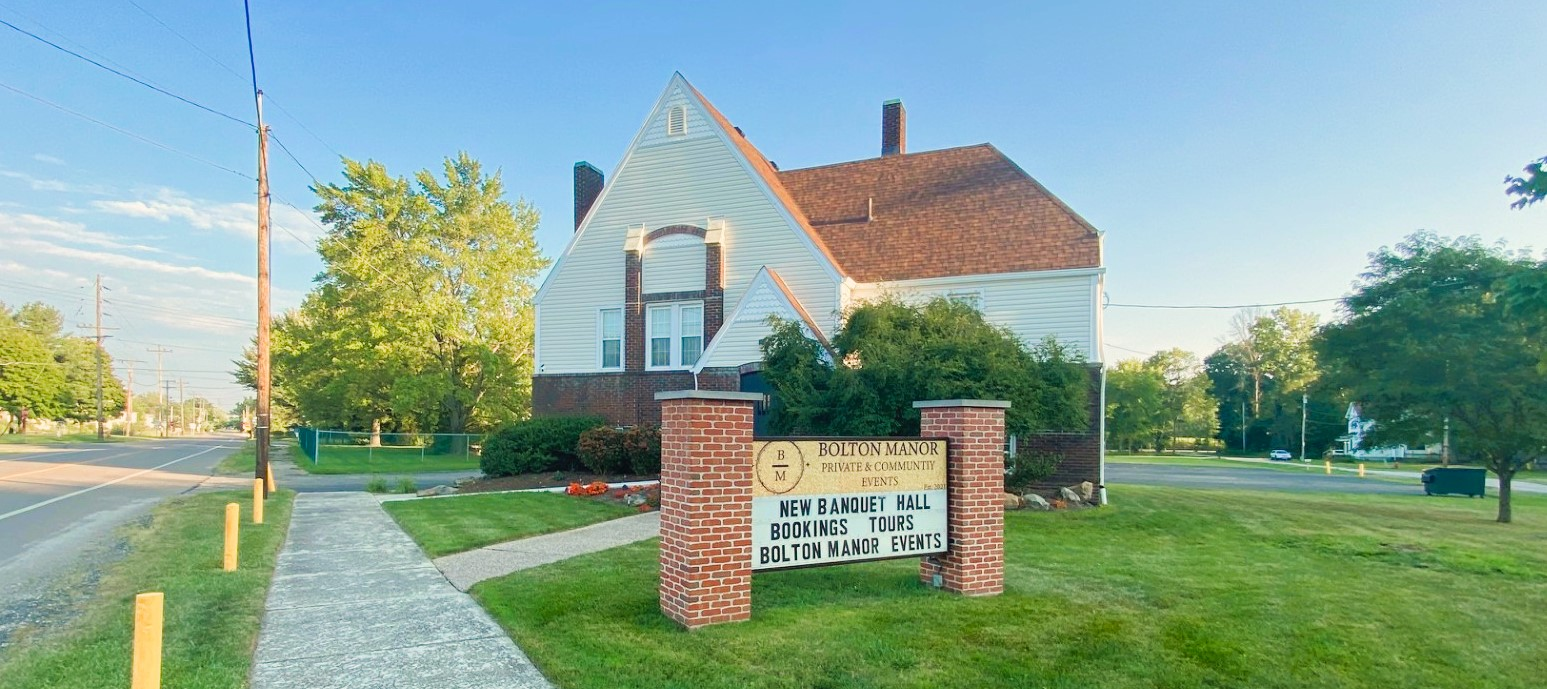

- Location within Ohio Location within the United States
- Coordinates: 40°56′34″N 81°07′24″W
- Country: United States
- State: Ohio
- County: Stark
- Township: Lexington

Area
  - Total: 0.76 sq mi (1.97 km^{2})
  - Land: 0.76 sq mi (1.96 km^{2})
  - Water: 0.0039 sq mi (0.01 km^{2})
- Elevation: 1,056 ft (322 m)

Population (2020)
  - Total: 654
  - Density: 864.2/sq mi (333.67/km^{2})
- Time zone: UTC-5 (Eastern (EST))
  - Summer (DST): UTC-4 (EDT)
- ZIP Code: 44601 (Alliance)
- Area codes: 330/234
- FIPS code: 39-07608
- GNIS feature ID: 2812840

Bolton is an unincorporated area and census-designated place (CDP) in Stark County, Ohio, United States. It was first listed as a CDP prior to the 2020 census. As of the 2020 census, Bolton had a population of 654.

The CDP is in northeastern Stark County, in central Lexington Township. It is bordered to the south by the city of Alliance. U.S. Route 62T, a freeway bypass of Alliance, forms the border between Bolton and Alliance and leads southwest 20 miles (32 km) to Canton. Ohio State Route 183 (Iowa Avenue) forms the northeast edge of Bolton and leads north 6 miles (10 km) to Atwater. State Route 619 (Edison Street) leaves Route 183 in the center of Bolton and leads west 11 miles (18 km) to Hartville.

Bolton is bordered to the west by Beech Creek, a north-flowing tributary of the Mahoning River, which flows through Youngstown to the Beaver River in Pennsylvania.

== Demographics ==
Historical population
Census	Pop.	Note	%±
2020	654		—
U.S. Decennial Census
