= Ohio State Route 619 =

State highway in northeastern Ohio, US

State Route 619

Route information
- Maintained by ODOT
- Length: 28.98 mi (46.64 km)
- Existed: 1937–present

Major junctions
- West end: I-76 / US 224 in Barberton
- SR 241 in Green
- East end: SR 183 near Alliance

Location
- Country: United States
- State: Ohio
- Counties: Summit, Stark

Highway system
- Ohio State Highway System; Interstate; US; State; Scenic
← SR 618	→ SR 621

State Route 619 (SR 619) is an east–west state highway in the northeastern portion of the U.S. state of Ohio. The western terminus of State Route 619 is at an interchange with the Interstate 76/U.S. Route 224 freeway in Barberton. Its eastern terminus is at State Route 183 in Lexington Township, just north of Alliance.

== Route description ==
State Route 619 travels through Summit and Stark Counties. There are no stretches of the route that are incorporated within the National Highway System.

== History ==
First designated in 1937, SR 619 has generally followed the Barberton-to-Alliance alignment that it maintains today since its inception. With the exception of some minor re-alignments in Barberton, the highway has not seen any other significant changes since making its first appearance.

== Major intersections ==
County	Location	mi	km	Destinations	Notes
Summit	Akron	0.00	0.00	I-76 / US 224 / East Avenue / Kenmore Boulevard – Lodi, Canton	Exit 17 (I-76)
Summit	New Franklin	4.87	7.84	SR 93 (Manchester Road) – Canal Fulton, Akron	
Summit	Green	10.01	16.11	SR 241 (Massillon Road) to I-77 – Massillon	
Stark	Hartville	16.65	26.80	SR 43 north (Kent Avenue) / Steffy Avenue – Kent	Western end of SR 43 concurrency
Stark	Hartville	17.20	27.68	SR 43 south (Prospect Avenue) – Canton	Eastern end of SR 43 concurrency
Stark	Marlboro Township	21.56	34.70	SR 44 (Ravenna Avenue) – Ravenna, Louisville	
Stark	Lexington Township	28.98	46.64	SR 183 (Iowa Avenue NE) / Gaskill Drive NE – Limaville	
1.000 mi = 1.609 km; 1.000 km = 0.621 mi: Concurrency terminus
