= Waco, Ohio =

Unincorporated community in Ohio, U.S.

Coordinates: 40°46′43″N 81°20′49″W

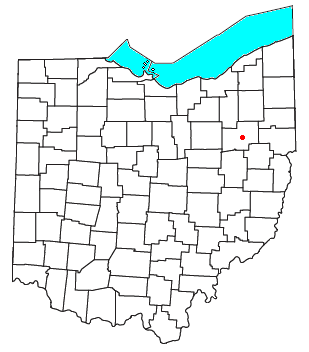
Location of Waco, Ohio

Waco is an unincorporated community in central Canton Township, Stark County, Ohio, United States. It lies along State Route 43 just southeast of the Canton city line. Waco's altitude is 1,070 feet (326 m). The community is part of the Canton–Massillon Metropolitan Statistical Area.

A post office called Waco was established in 1891, and remained in operation until 1906.

== Education ==
Children from Waco attend the schools of the Canton Local School District.
