= North Industry, Ohio =

Census designated place

- CDP
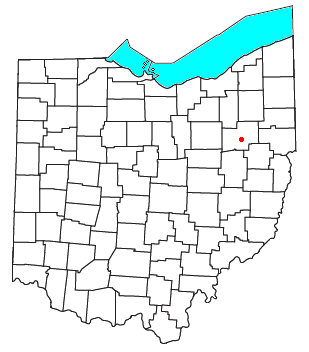
- Location of North Industry, Ohio
- Coordinates: 40°44′40″N 81°22′42″W
- Country: United States
- State: Ohio
- County: Stark
- Township: Canton
- Elevation: 1,056 ft (322 m)

Population (2020)
  - Total: 1,528
- Time zone: UTC-5 (Eastern (EST))
  - Summer (DST): UTC-4 (EDT)
- GNIS feature ID: 2812841

North Industry is a census-designated place in southern Canton Township, Stark County, Ohio, United States, along the Nimishillen Creek. The community is part of the Canton–Massillon Metropolitan Statistical Area. The population was 1,528 at the 2020 census.

== History ==
A post office called North Industry was established in 1832, and remains in operation. Early industries at North Industry included a blast furnace and a watermill.

== Education ==
Children from North Industry attend the schools of the Canton Local School District.
