= Sippo =

Sippo may refer to:

- Sippo, Ohio, unincorporated community
- Teemu Sippo (born 1947), Catholic bishop of Helsinki
