= Freeburg =

Freeburg can refer to:

- Freeburg, Illinois
- Freeburg, Minnesota
- Freeburg, Missouri
- Freeburg, Ohio
- Freeburg, Pennsylvania
- Fictional city in video game This Is the Police.
