= Belfort, Ohio =

Unincorporated community in Ohio, U.S.

Coordinates: 40°48′44″N 81°14′43″W

Belfort is an unincorporated community in northern Osnaburg Township, Stark County, Ohio, United States.

== History ==
Belfort was laid out in 1849, and named after Belfort, in France, the ancestral home of a share of the first settlers.
