= Atwater Congregational Church =

Historic church in Ohio, United States

- U.S. National Register of Historic Places
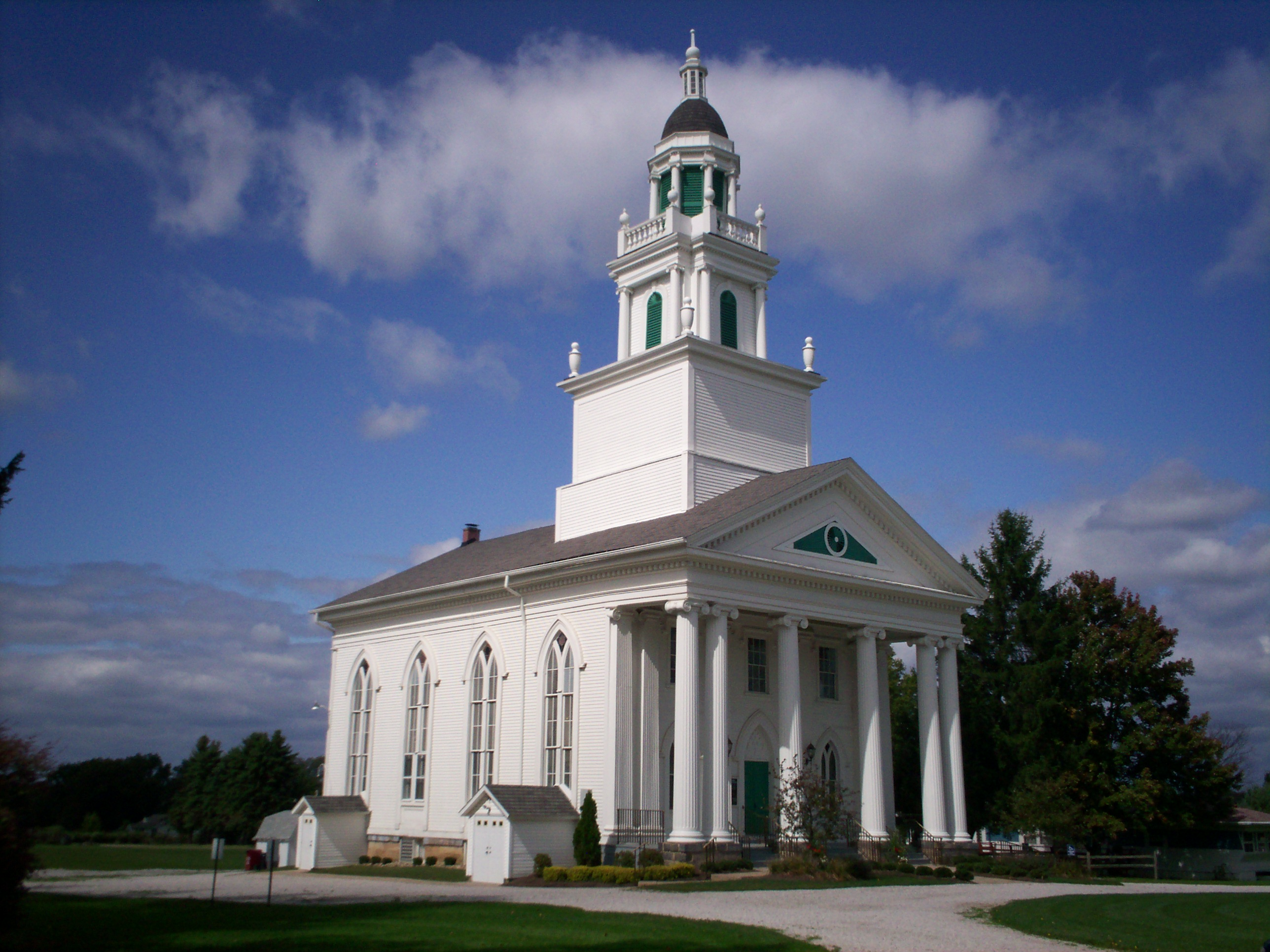
- September 28, 2009

- Location within Ohio Location within the United States
- Location: Atwater, Ohio
- Coordinates: 41°1′21″N 81°8′55″W
- Architect: Simeon Porter
- Architectural style: Greek Revival, Gothic Revival and Other
- NRHP reference No.: 73001517
- Added to NRHP: 1973-02-23

Atwater Congregational Church is a registered historic building in Atwater, Ohio, United States, listed on the National Register of Historic Places since February 23, 1973. It was built in 1841 and incorporates elements of both the Federal and Greek Revival styles and stands over 100 feet (30 m) tall. The church has had a continuous congregation that was founded in 1818 and continues to meet today as a non-denominational church. The building has undergone several renovations and repairs through the years.

== History ==
The congregation was organized on March 20, 1818, by Reverend Caleb Pitkin, William Hanford, and Joseph Treat and was placed under the see of the Grand River Presbytery with 11 members attending the charter service. 22 new members were added the following year and meetings were held in the home of a parishioner. In 1822, a small brick church was constructed near the current church site. The congregation continued to meet there until it was decided to build a larger building in the fall of 1836. Construction began in 1838 and the completed structure was dedicated on November 7, 1841. On November 14, 1841, Reverend E. C. Sharp preached his first sermon in the new building.

After the death of Reverend Sharp, the congregation voted to leave the Cleveland Portage Presbytery on May 20, 1870. A new constitution was drafted in 1871 which made it a Congregational church. The name became "The Congregational Church of Christ in Atwater". In 1877, the church underwent repairs, at the cost of $1,548.01, and was re-dedicated and in 1896, plaster began falling from the interior dome so a flat ceiling was assembled.

In 1920, the basement was refurbished to make it suitable for meetings and other functions. At the same time, electric lights were installed in the sanctuary, replacing the 16 oil lamps which hung from the ceiling. When the renovations were completed, a festival was held which was attended by at least 1000 people from as far away as Fort Wayne, Indiana. In 1933, the church was repainted by M. C. Hall. A year later chimes were installed. Another renovation was begun in 1944. The dome was restored and electric lights were fitted in a circle around the dome. A re-dedication service was held 10 years later on June 6, 1954. A new roof was installed in 1964 and the steeple was repaired in 1967. In 1980, a new asphalt shingle roof was installed.

In 2001, another restoration was initiated. Beginning in 2005, the church underwent a major renovation which was completed in 2007. Funding for the restoration was made available through a large donation from the estate of former pastor Fred Hofer.

== Historic uses ==
- Religious structure
