= Atwater Township, Ohio =

Township in Ohio, US

Atwater Township
- Civil township
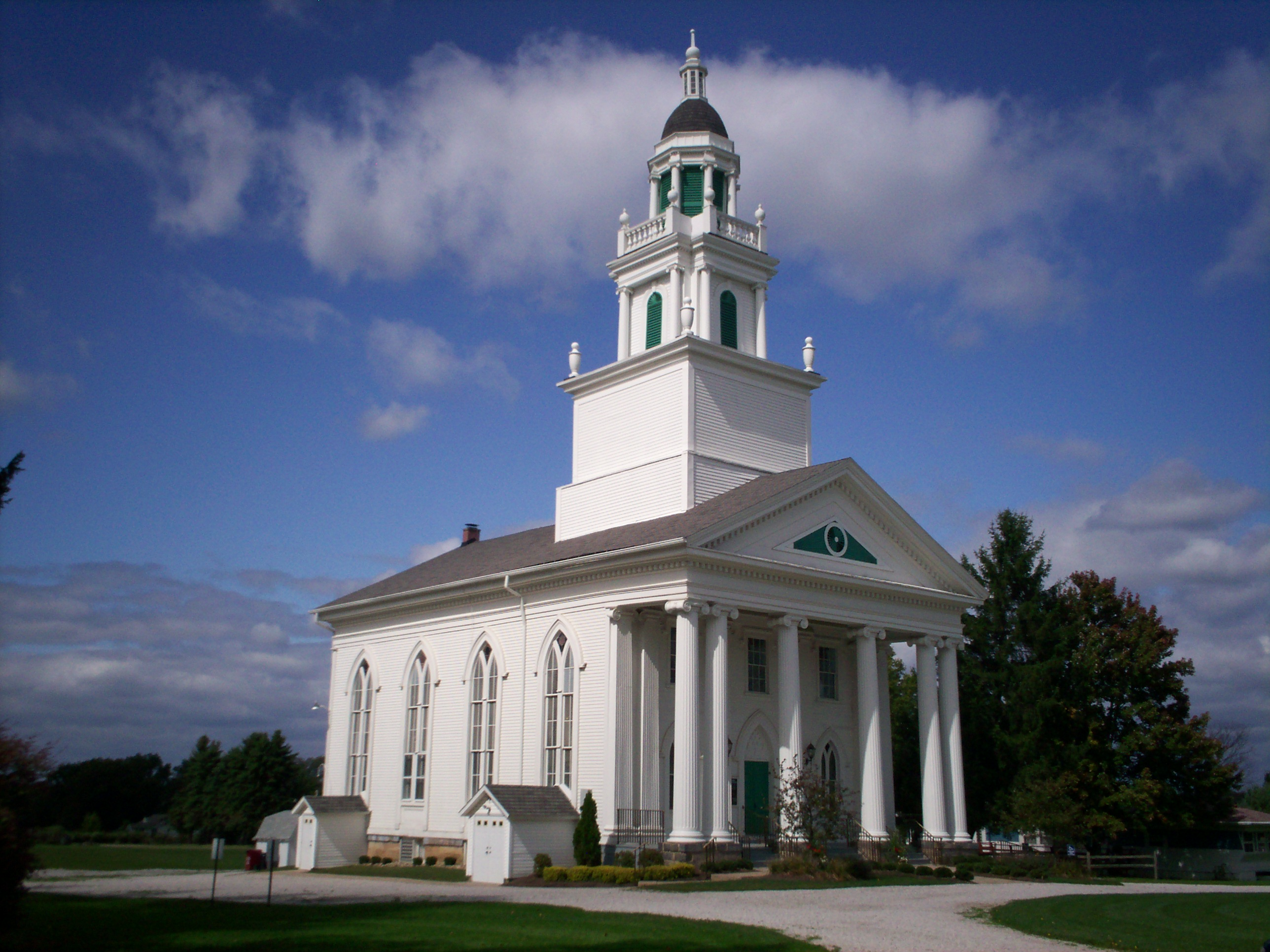
- Historic Atwater Congregational Church

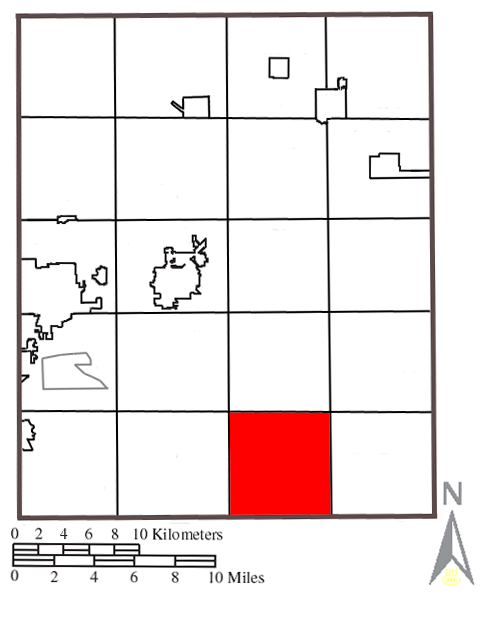
- Location within Portage County
- Coordinates: 41°1′23″N 81°9′40″W
- Country: United States
- State: Ohio
- County: Portage

Area
  - Total: 25.9 sq mi (67.2 km^{2})
  - Land: 25.9 sq mi (67.1 km^{2})
  - Water: 0.077 sq mi (0.2 km^{2})
- Elevation: 1,135 ft (346 m)

Population (2020)
  - Total: 2,564
  - Density: 101/sq mi (38.9/km^{2})
- Time zone: UTC-5 (Eastern (EST))
  - Summer (DST): UTC-4 (EDT)
- ZIP code: 44201
- Area code: 330
- FIPS code: 39-02862
- GNIS feature ID: 1086821
- Website: https://www.atwatertwp.net/

Atwater Township is one of the eighteen townships of Portage County, Ohio, United States. As of the 2020 census there were 2,564 people living in the township.

== Geography ==
Located in the southern part of the county, it borders the following townships:

- Edinburg Township - north
- Palmyra Township - northeast corner
- Deerfield Township - east
- Lexington Township, Stark County - south
- Marlboro Township, Stark County - southwest
- Randolph Township - west
- Rootstown Township - northwest corner

No municipalities are located in Atwater Township, although the census-designated place of Atwater is located in the center of the township.

== Name and history ==
Atwater Township is named for Capt. Caleb Atwater, a landowner in the Connecticut Western Reserve. It is the only Atwater Township statewide.

== Government ==
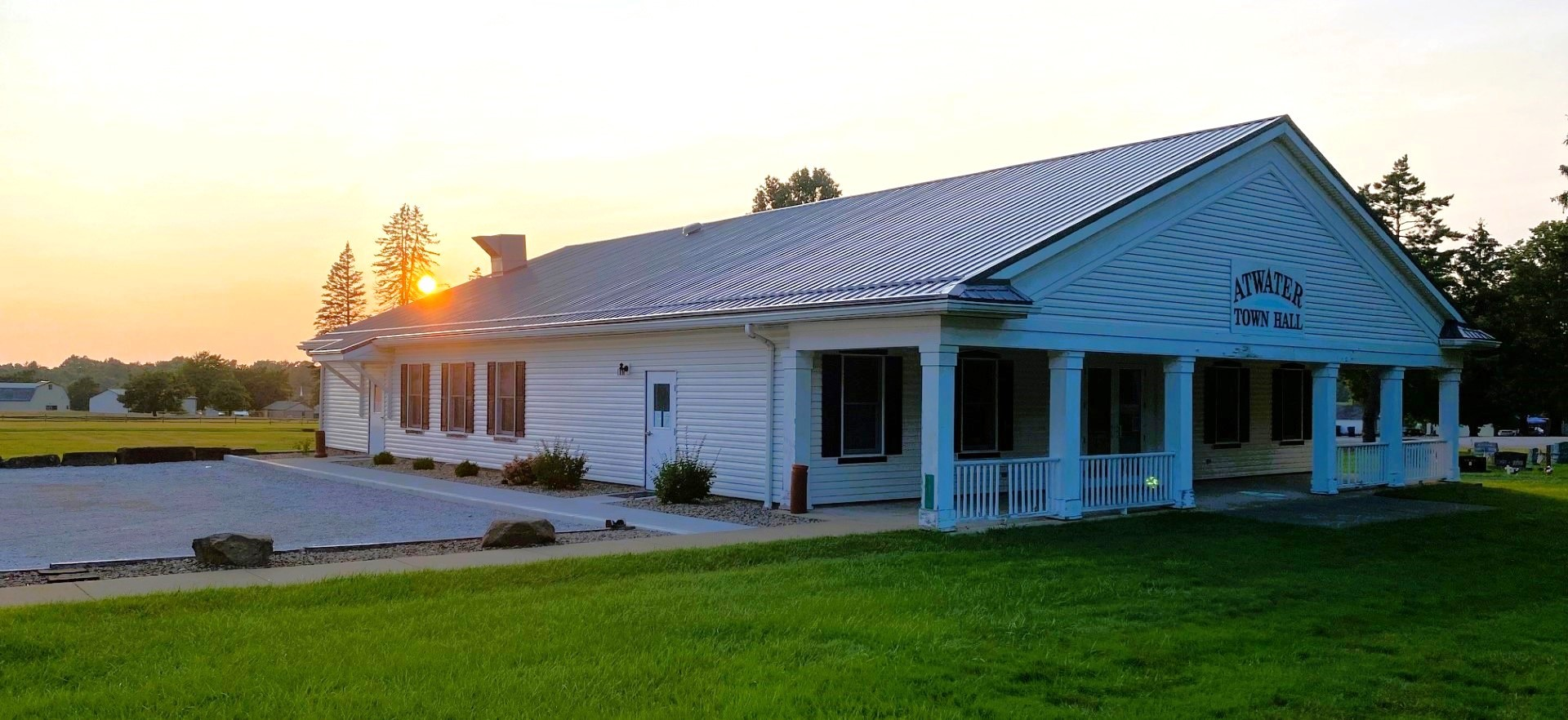
Atwater Town Hall

The township is governed by a three-member board of trustees, who are elected in November of odd-numbered years to a four-year term beginning on the following January 1. Two are elected in the year after the presidential election and one is elected in the year before it. There is also an elected township fiscal officer, who serves a four-year term beginning on April 1 of the year after the election, which is held in November of the year before the presidential election. Vacancies in the fiscal officership or on the board of trustees are filled by the remaining trustees.

== Public services ==
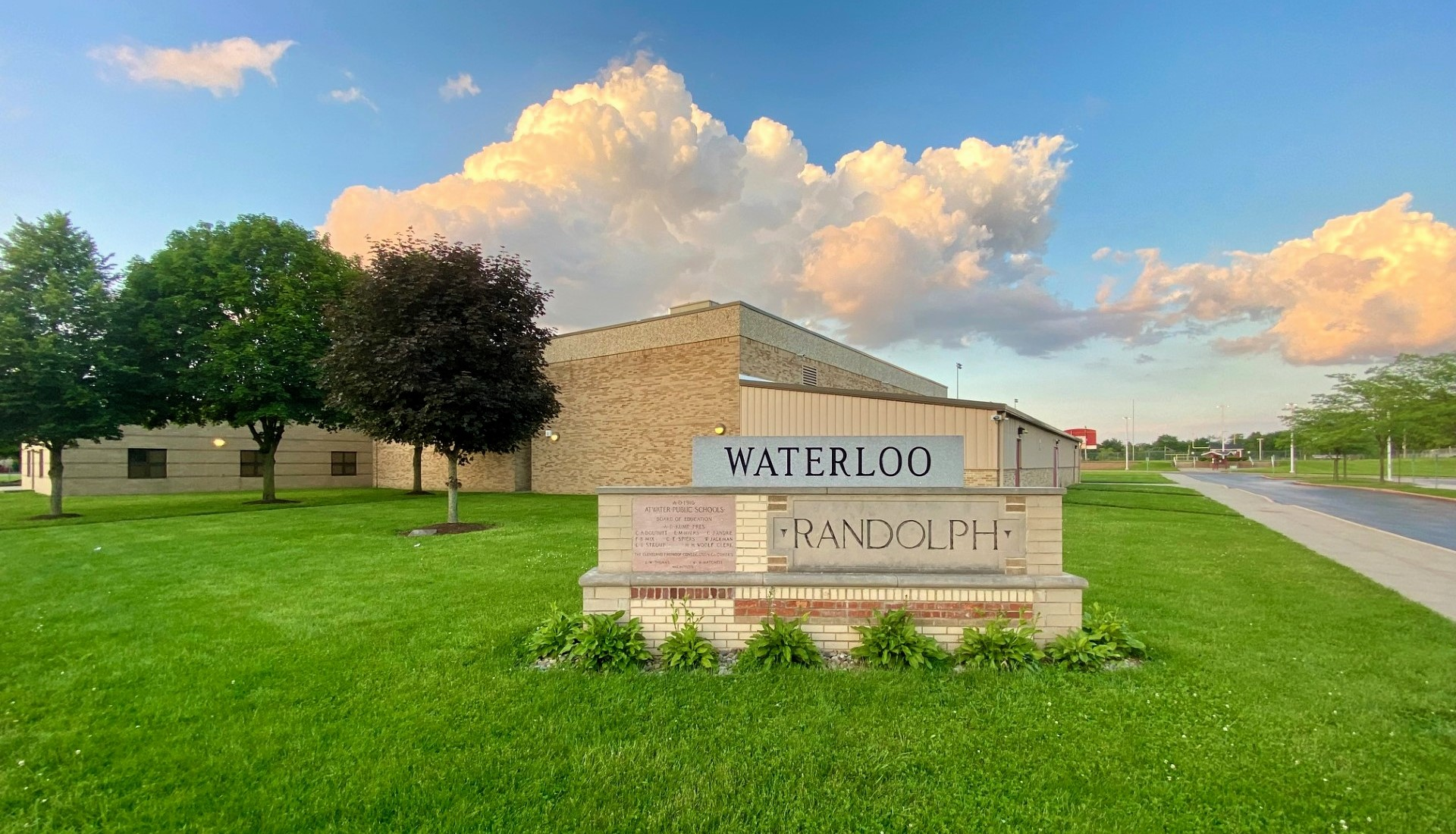
Waterloo Local School District

Students in Atwater Township are served by the Waterloo Local School District, which also serves neighboring Randolph Township. Fire and EMS protection is provided by the Atwater Township Volunteer Fire Department.
