= Marlboro, Ohio =

- Unincorporated community and Census-designated place
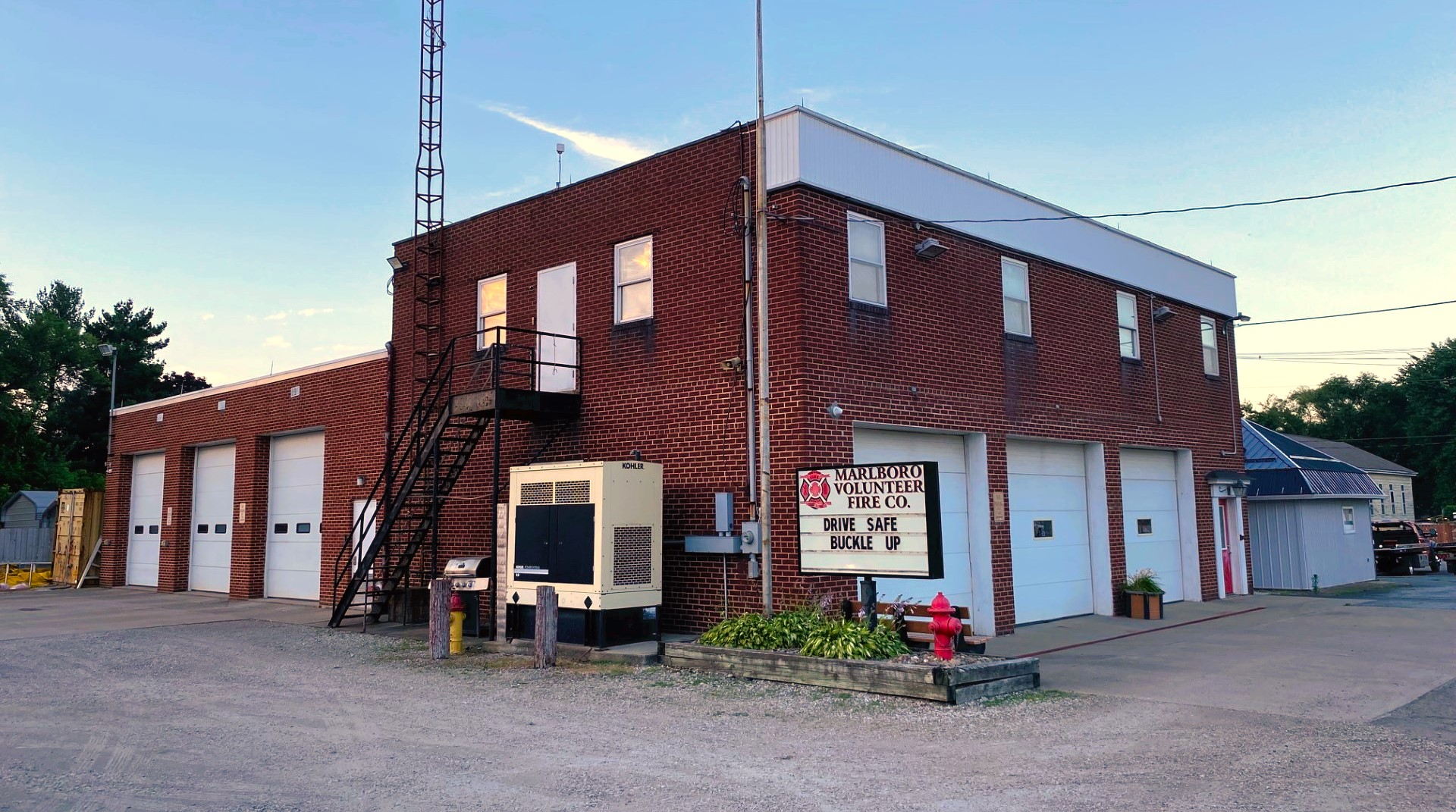

- Location within Ohio
- Coordinates: 40°57′02″N 81°12′59″W
- Country: United States
- State: Ohio
- County: Stark

Area
  - Total: 0.43 sq mi (1.12 km^{2})
  - Land: 0.43 sq mi (1.11 km^{2})
  - Water: 0.0039 sq mi (0.01 km^{2})
- Elevation: 1,168 ft (356 m)

Population (2020)
  - Total: 247
  - Density: 575/sq mi (221.9/km^{2})
- Time zone: UTC-5 (Eastern (EST))
  - Summer (DST): UTC-4 (EDT)
- Area codes: 234 and 330
- GNIS feature ID: 2628928

Marlboro is a census-designated place in Stark County, Ohio, United States. As of the 2020 census, Marlboro had a population of 247.

== History ==
Marlboro was laid out in 1827, taking its name from Marlboro Township. The community was originally built up chiefly by Quakers. By 1833, Marlborough had about 50 inhabitants. A post office called Marlborough was established in 1833, the name was changed to Marlboro in 1893, and the post office closed in 1906.

== Demographics ==
Historical population
Census	Pop.	Note	%±
2020	247		—
U.S. Decennial Census

== Notable people ==
- Thomas Corwin Mendenhall, Physicist.
- Walter Curran Mendenhall, Geologist.
