= Washington Township, Stark County, Ohio =

Township in Ohio, US

- Township
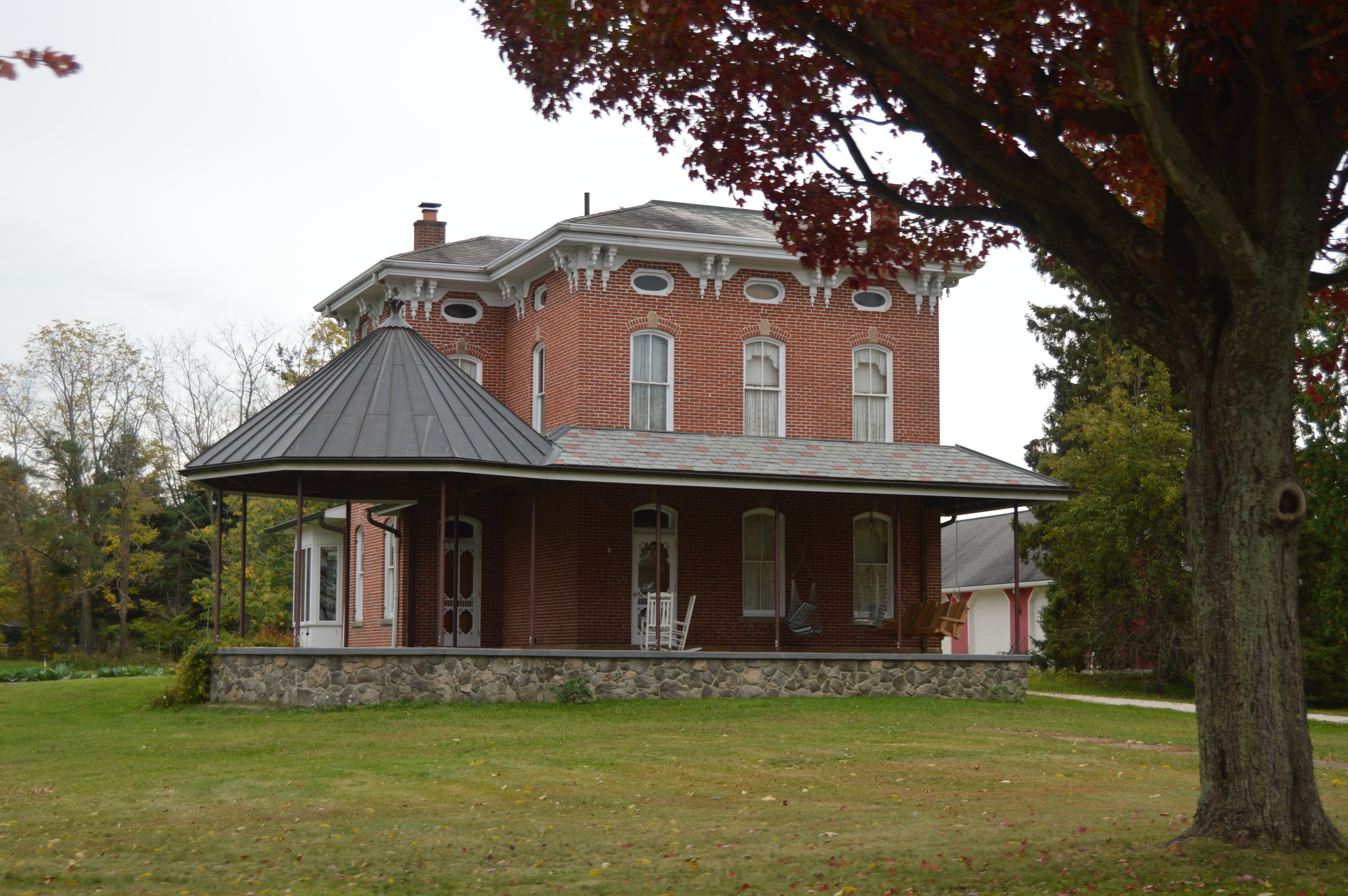
- Maudru House at Maximo

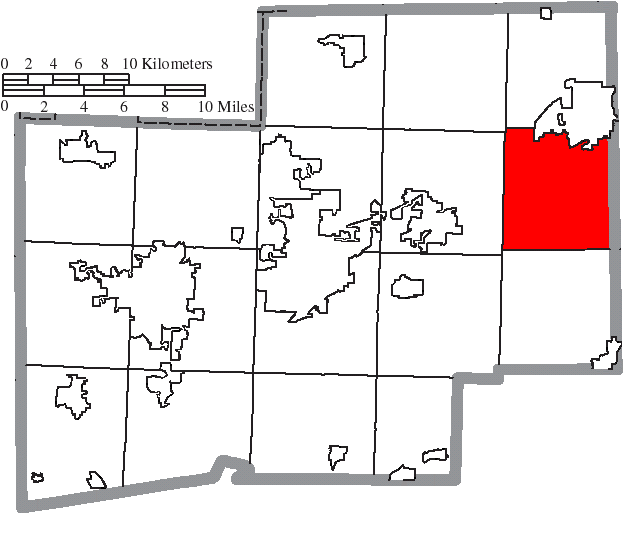
- Location of Washington Township in Stark County
- Coordinates: 40°52′25″N 81°8′26″W
- Country: United States
- State: Ohio
- County: Stark
- Organized: 3 December 1821

Area
  - Total: 30.8 sq mi (79.7 km^{2})
  - Land: 30.8 sq mi (79.7 km^{2})
  - Water: 0 sq mi (0.0 km^{2})
- Elevation: 1,230 ft (375 m)

Population (2020)
  - Total: 4,443
  - Density: 144/sq mi (55.7/km^{2})
- Time zone: UTC-5 (Eastern (EST))
  - Summer (DST): UTC-4 (EDT)
- FIPS code: 39-81634
- GNIS feature ID: 1086992
- Website: https://www.wash-twp-stark-oh.us/

Washington Township is one of the seventeen townships of Stark County, Ohio, United States. The 2020 census found 4,443 people in the township.

== Geography ==
Located in the eastern part of the county, it borders the following townships and city:

- Lexington Township - north
- Alliance - northeast
- Knox Township, Columbiana County - east
- West Township, Columbiana County - southeast corner
- Paris Township - south
- Nimishillen Township - west
- Marlboro Township - northwest

Part of the city of Alliance is located in northern Washington Township, with the unincorporated communities of Maximo in the eastern part of the township and Freeburg near OH-153 in the southern part of the township.

== Name and history ==
It is one of forty-three Washington Townships statewide.

In 1833, Washington Township contained one gristmill, three saw mills, and one tannery.

== Government ==
The township is governed by a three-member board of trustees, who are elected in November of odd-numbered years to a four-year term beginning on the following January 1. Two are elected in the year after the presidential election and one is elected in the year before it. There is also an elected township fiscal officer, who serves a four-year term beginning on April 1 of the year after the election, which is held in November of the year before the presidential election. Vacancies in the fiscal officership or on the board of trustees are filled by the remaining trustees.
