= Lake Township, Stark County, Ohio =

Township in Ohio, US

- Township
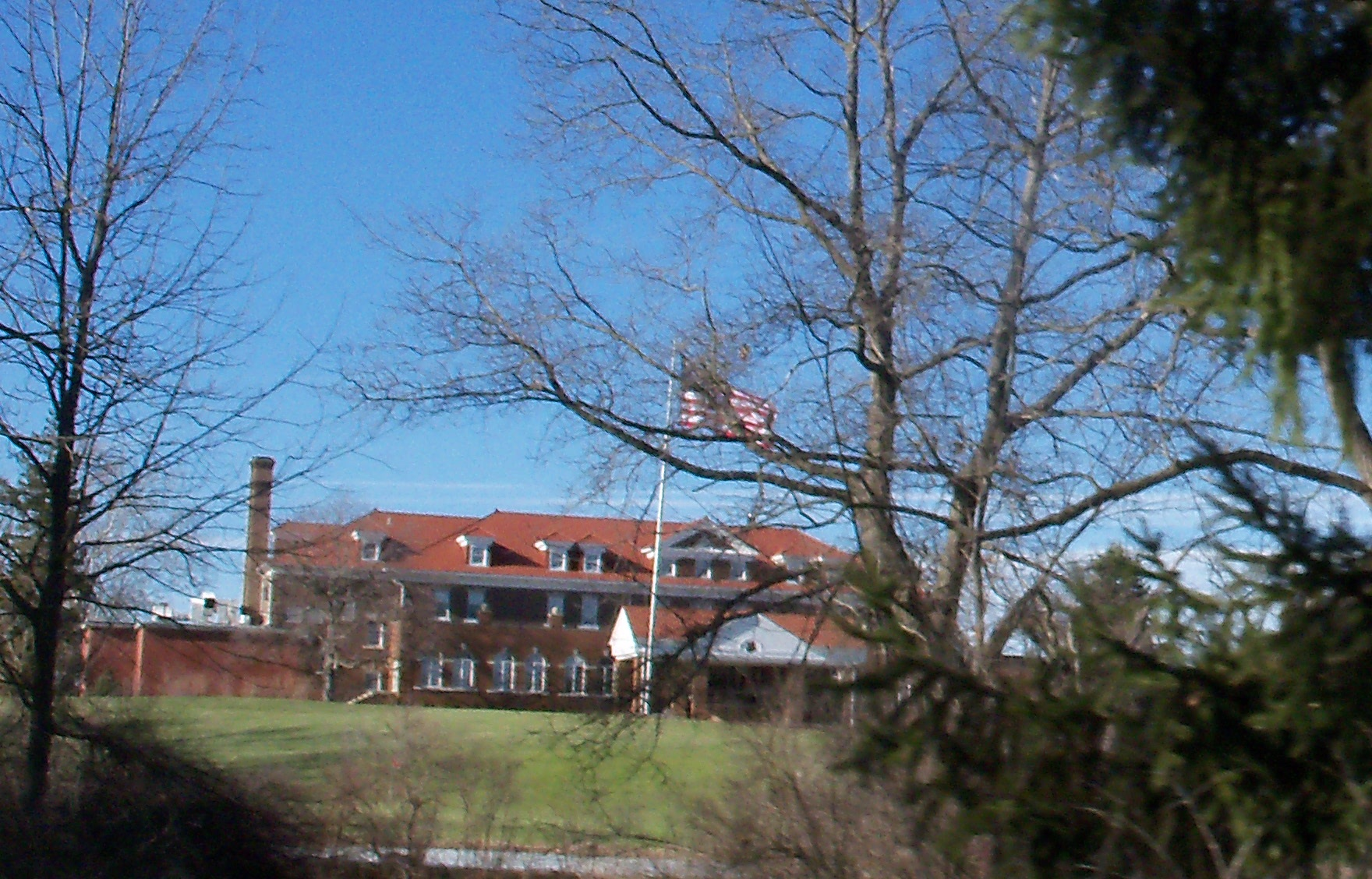
- Congress Lake clubhouse

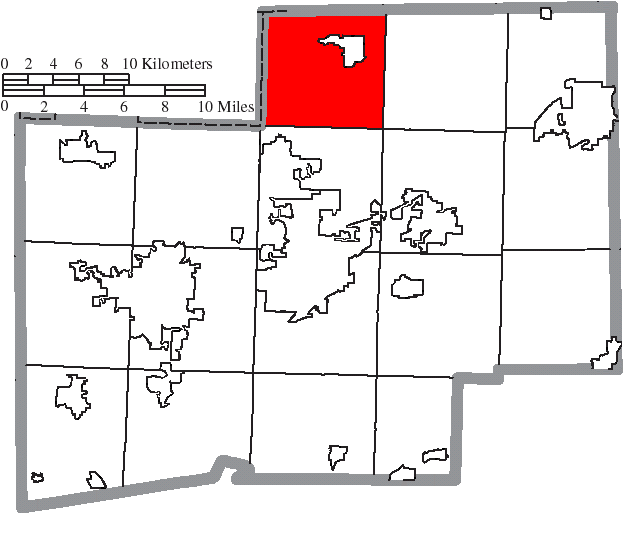
- Location of Lake Township in Stark County
- Coordinates: 40°57′14″N 81°22′8″W
- Country: United States
- State: Ohio
- County: Stark

Area
  - Total: 35.1 sq mi (91.0 km^{2})
  - Land: 34.7 sq mi (90.0 km^{2})
  - Water: 0.39 sq mi (1.0 km^{2})
- Elevation: 1,155 ft (352 m)

Population (2020)
  - Total: 30,324
  - Density: 873/sq mi (336.9/km^{2})
- Time zone: UTC-5 (Eastern (EST))
  - Summer (DST): UTC-4 (EDT)
- FIPS code: 39-41314
- GNIS feature ID: 1086977
- Website: https://www.laketwpstarkco.com/

Lake Township is one of the seventeen townships of Stark County, Ohio, United States. It is an urban township; the 2020 census found 30,324 people in the township.

== Geography ==
Located in the northern part of the county, it borders the following townships and cities:

- Suffield Township, Portage County - north
- Randolph Township, Portage County - northeast
- Marlboro Township - east
- Nimishillen Township - southeast corner
- Plain Township - south
- Jackson Township - southwest corner
- Green - west
- Springfield Township, Summit County - northwest

Several populated places are located in Lake Township (incorporated areas are not part of the Township):

- The village of Hartville, in the northeast
- The census-designated place of Greentown, in the southwest
- The census-designated place of Uniontown, in the northwest
- The unincorporated community of Mount Pleasant, in the southwest
- Two other unincorporated communities straddle Lake Township's borders: Aultman, which overlaps into Green within the southwest portion of the township, and Cairo, which lies upon the township's southern border with Plain Township.

== Name and history ==
Historical population
Census	Pop.	Note	%±
1820	588		—
1840	2,162		—
1850	2,228		3.1%
1860	2,321		4.2%
1870	2,113		−9.0%
1880	2,177		3.0%
1890	2,164		−0.6%
1900	2,312		6.8%
1910	2,539		9.8%
1920	3,073		21.0%
1930	4,337		41.1%
1940	5,246		21.0%
1950	6,716		28.0%
1960	9,358		39.3%
1970	13,053		39.5%
1990	22,343		—
2000	25,892		15.9%
2010	29,961		15.7%

Lake Township became its own stand alone civil township in 1816 after its original formation as a survey township within Plain Township then in 1806 within Green Township. Statewide, other Lake Townships are located in Ashland, Logan, and Wood counties.

== Government ==
The township is governed by a three-member board of trustees, who are elected in November of odd-numbered years to a four-year term beginning on the following January 1. Two are elected in the year after the presidential election and one is elected in the year before it. There is also an elected township fiscal officer, who serves a four-year term beginning on April 1 of the year after the election, which is held in November of the year before the presidential election. Vacancies in the fiscal officership or on the board of trustees are filled by the remaining trustees.

== Education ==
The northern and eastern halves of the township (including Hartville) comprise the majority of the Lake Local School District, home to Lake Middle/High School. However, the southwestern quarter of the township is zoned to North Canton City School District, and a small area in the far southeast corner of the township is part of the Plain Local School District.
