= Canton Township, Ohio =

Township in Ohio, US

- Township
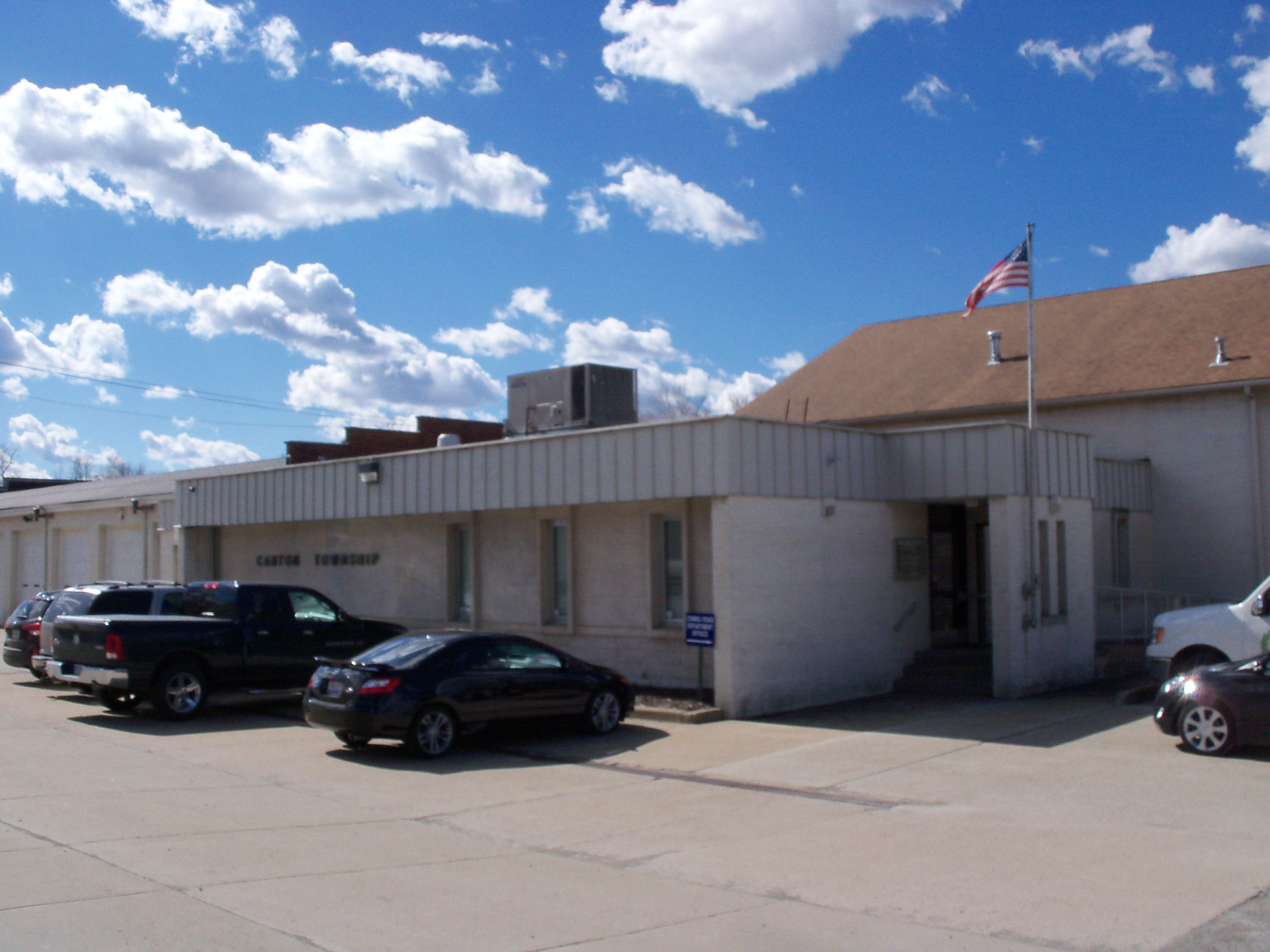
- Offices and garage

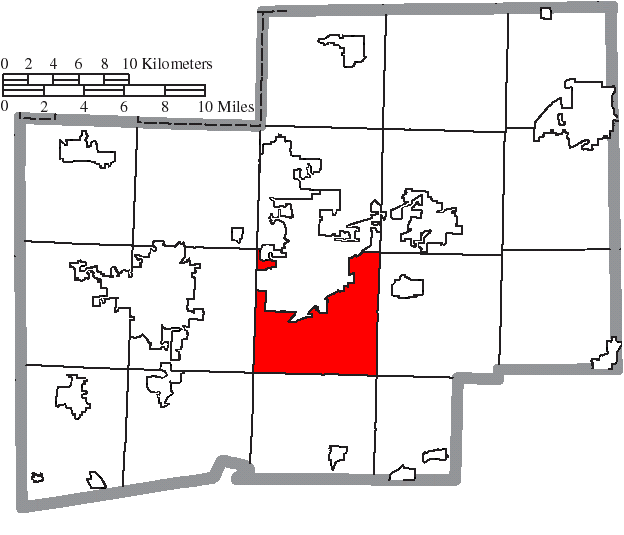
- Location of Canton Township in Stark County
- Coordinates: 40°46′22″N 81°22′7″W
- Country: United States
- State: Ohio
- County: Stark

Area
  - Total: 25.3 sq mi (65.5 km^{2})
  - Land: 25.1 sq mi (65.1 km^{2})
  - Water: 0.15 sq mi (0.4 km^{2})
- Elevation: 1,004 ft (306 m)

Population (2020)
  - Total: 12,477
  - Density: 497/sq mi (191.7/km^{2})
- Time zone: UTC-5 (Eastern (EST))
  - Summer (DST): UTC-4 (EDT)
- ZIP codes: 44702, 44705, 44706, 44707
- Area code: 330
- FIPS code: 39-12014
- GNIS feature ID: 1086975
- Website: https://www.cantontwp-oh.gov/

Canton Township is one of the seventeen townships of Stark County, Ohio, United States. Just south of the city of Canton itself, the 2020 census found 12,477 people in the township.

== Geography ==
Located in the central part of the county, it borders the following townships:

- Plain Township - north
- Nimishillen Township - northeast corner
- Osnaburg Township - east
- Sandy Township - southeast corner
- Pike Township - south
- Bethlehem Township - southwest corner
- Perry Township - west
- Jackson Township - northwest corner

The city of Canton, the county seat of Stark County, occupies much of northern Canton Township. A small area around the northwest corner of the township remains outside of the city of Canton, and part of this area is occupied by part of the village of Meyers Lake. The unincorporated communities of North Industry and Waco are located in the southern and central parts of the township, respectively.

== Name and history ==
It is the only Canton Township statewide.

Canton Township was described in 1833 as having five gristmills, nine saw mills, four fulling mills, six tanneries, nineteen stores, one oil mill and one blast furnace.

== Government ==
The township is governed by a three-member board of trustees, who are elected in November of odd-numbered years to a four-year term beginning on the following January 1. Two are elected in the year after the presidential election and one is elected in the year before it. There is also an elected township fiscal officer, who serves a four-year term beginning on April 1 of the year after the election, which is held in November of the year before the presidential election. Vacancies in the fiscal officer position or on the board of trustees are filled by the remaining trustees. As of 2023, the trustees are Chris Nichols, Mark Shaffer, and Keith Hochadel, and the fiscal officer is John Ring.

== Education ==
Students attend Canton Local School District. The high school for this district is Canton South High School.
