= Mapleton, Ohio =

Unincorporated community in Ohio, U.S.

Coordinates: 40°44′45″N 81°14′46″W

Mapleton is an unincorporated community situated along State Route 44 in south-central Osnaburg Township, Stark County, Ohio, United States.

== History ==
A post office called Mapleton was established in 1837, and remained in operation until 1906. Besides the post office, Mapleton had two churches, a hotel, schoolhouse, and several country stores.
