= Cairo, Stark County, Ohio =

Unincorporated community in Ohio, U.S.

Coordinates: 40°54′16″N 81°21′37″W

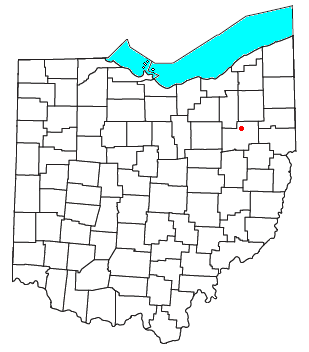
Location of Cairo in Stark County, Ohio

Cairo is an unincorporated community that lies upon the border of Lake Township and Plain Township within Stark County, Ohio, United States. Its altitude is 1,145 feet (349 m). The community is part of the Canton–Massillon Metropolitan Statistical Area.

== History ==
Cairo was not officially platted. A post office called Cairo was established in 1850, and remained in operation until 1904.
