= Osnaburg Township, Stark County, Ohio =

Township in Ohio, US

- Township
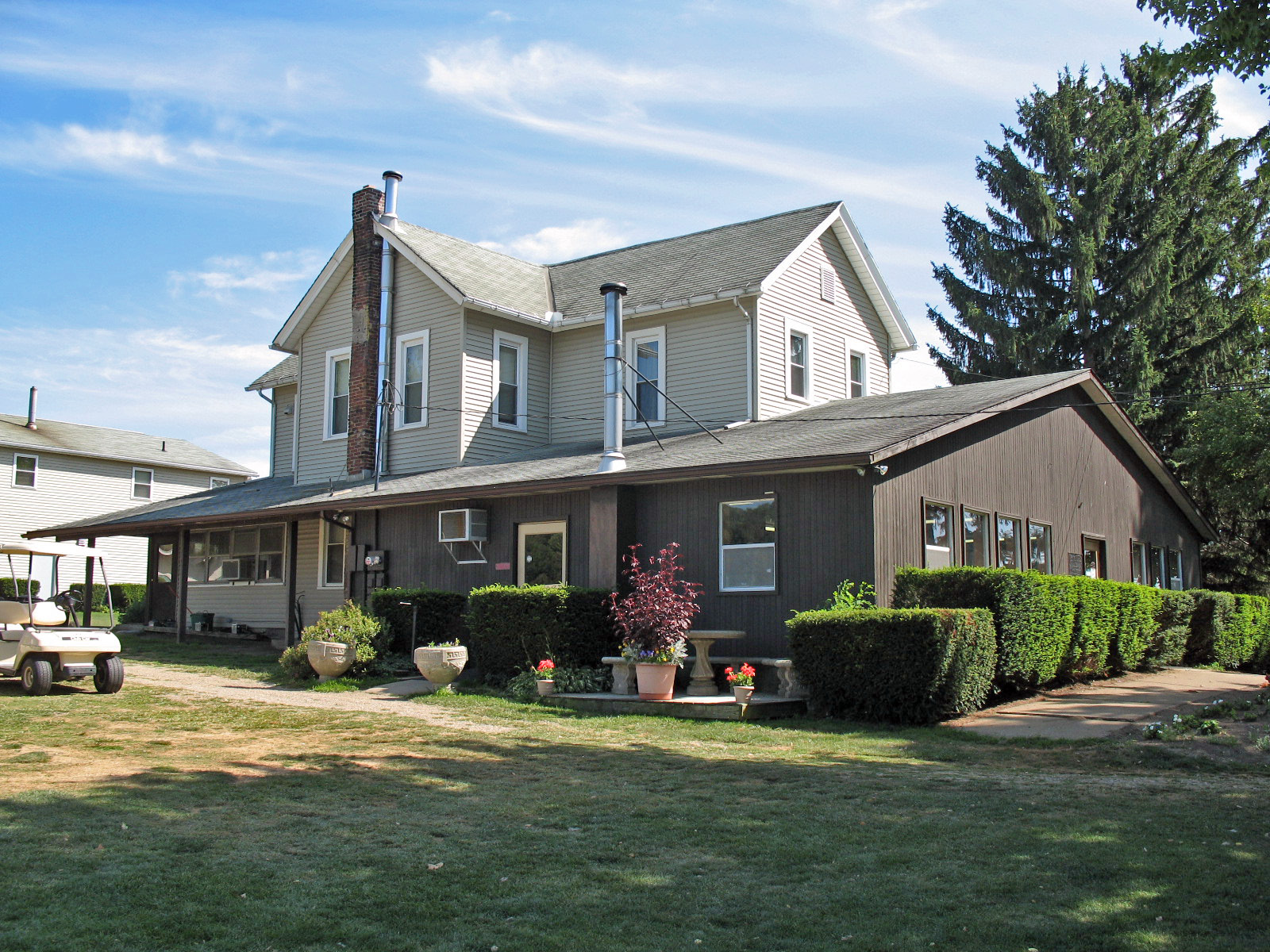
- Clubhouse at the Clearview Golf Club

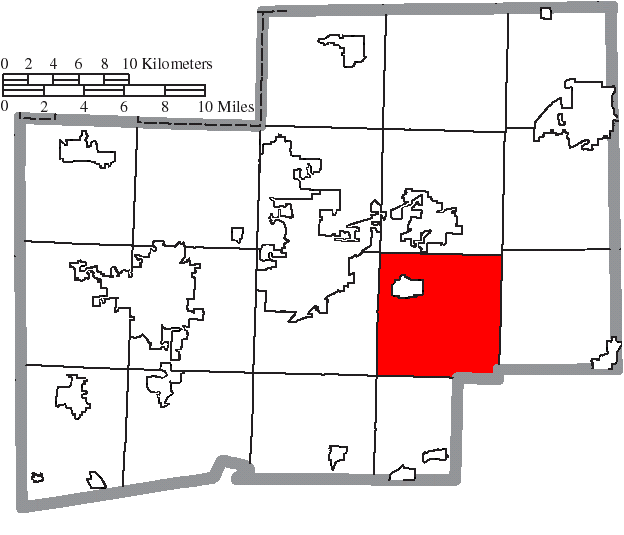
- Location of Osnaburg Township in Stark County
- Coordinates: 40°46′11″N 81°16′15″W
- Country: United States
- State: Ohio
- County: Stark
- Organized: 16 March 1809

Area
  - Total: 37.1 sq mi (96.0 km^{2})
  - Land: 37.1 sq mi (96.0 km^{2})
  - Water: 0 sq mi (0.0 km^{2})
- Elevation: 1,184 ft (361 m)

Population (2020)
  - Total: 5,421
  - Density: 146/sq mi (56.5/km^{2})
- Time zone: UTC-5 (Eastern (EST))
  - Summer (DST): UTC-4 (EDT)
- ZIP code: 44730
- Area code: 330
- FIPS code: 39-58926
- GNIS feature ID: 1086984
- Website: https://osnaburgtwp.com/

Osnaburg Township is one of the seventeen townships of Stark County, Ohio, United States. The 2020 census found 5,421 people in the township.

== Geography ==
Located in the southeastern part of the county, it borders the following townships:

- Nimishillen Township - north
- Paris Township - east
- Brown Township, Carroll County - southeast
- Sandy Township - south
- Pike Township - southwest corner
- Canton Township - west
- Plain Township - northwest corner

The unincorporated communities of Mapleton and Belfort are located in the south-central and northern areas of the township, respectively.

The village of East Canton is located in northwestern Osnaburg Township.

== Name and history ==
The township's name reminds of the German city Osnabrück - the German part -brück ("bridge") was changed to -burg ("castle"), to avoid the letter "ü". It is the only Osnaburg Township statewide.

In 1833, Osnaburg Township contained one gristmill, seven saw mills, two tanneries, four stores, and one German and English book office.

== Government ==
Historical population
Census	Pop.	Note	%±
1820	813		—
1830	1,620		99.3%
1840	2,333		44.0%
1850	2,225		−4.6%
1860	2,026		−8.9%
1870	2,046		1.0%
1880	2,298		12.3%
1890	2,287		−0.5%
1900	2,166		−5.3%
1910	2,127		−1.8%
1920	2,147		0.9%
1930	3,078		43.4%
1940	3,483		13.2%
1950	4,496		29.1%
1960	5,409		20.3%
1970	6,067		12.2%
1990	5,781		—
2000	5,886		1.8%
2010	5,616		−4.6%
2020	5,421		−3.5%

The township is governed by a three-member board of trustees, who are elected in November of odd-numbered years to a four-year term beginning on the following January 1. Two are elected in the year after the presidential election and one is elected in the year before it. There is also an elected township fiscal officer, who serves a four-year term beginning on April 1 of the year after the election, which is held in November of the year before the presidential election. Vacancies in the fiscal officership or on the board of trustees are filled by the remaining trustees.
