= Stark County, Ohio =

County in Ohio, United States

- County
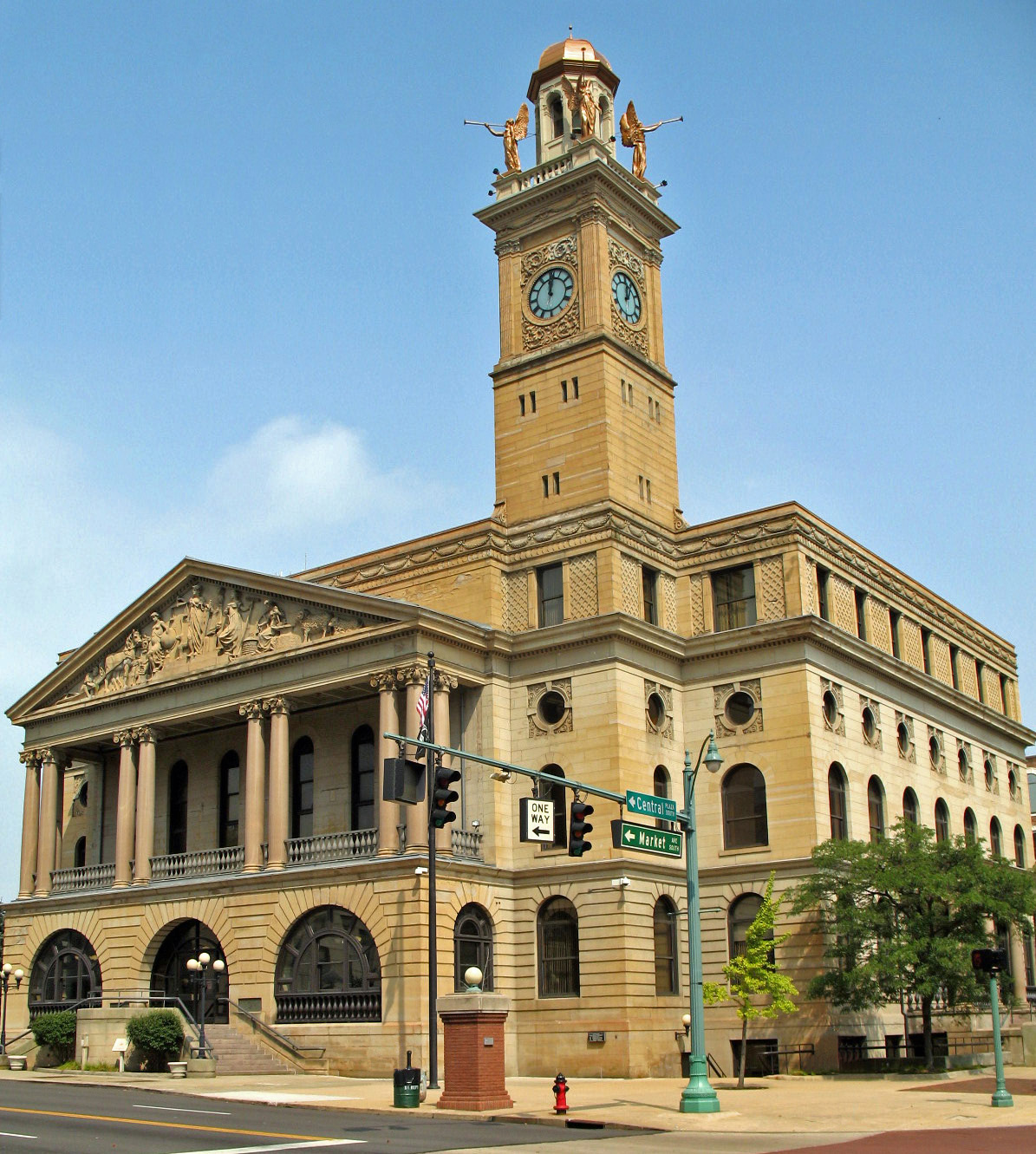
- Stark County Courthouse

- Flag Seal

- Location within the U.S. state of Ohio
- Coordinates: 40°49′N 81°22′W
- Country: United States
- State: Ohio
- Founded: January 1, 1809
- Named for: John Stark
- Seat: Canton
- Largest city: Canton

Area
  - Total: 581 sq mi (1,500 km^{2})
  - Land: 575 sq mi (1,490 km^{2})
  - Water: 5.3 sq mi (14 km^{2}) 0.9%

Population (2020)
  - Total: 374,853
  - Estimate (2025): 373,771 ▼
  - Density: 652/sq mi (252/km^{2})
- Time zone: UTC−5 (Eastern)
  - Summer (DST): UTC−4 (EDT)
- Congressional districts: 6th, 13th
- Website: www.starkcountyohio.gov

Stark County is a county located in the northeastern part of U.S. state of Ohio. As of the 2020 census, the population was 374,853, making it the eighth-most populous county in Ohio. Its county seat is Canton. The county was created in 1808 and organized the next year. It is named for John Stark, an officer in the American Revolutionary War.

Stark County is included in the Canton-Massillon, OH Metropolitan Statistical Area, which is also included in the Cleveland-Akron-Canton, OH Combined Statistical Area.

== History ==
Stark County was named in honor of American Revolutionary War General John Stark. John Stark (August 28, 1728 – May 8, 1822) was a general who served in the American Continental Army during the American Revolutionary War. He became widely known as the "Hero of Bennington" for his exemplary service at the Battle of Bennington in 1777.

In the 1760s and 1770s Moravian missionaries from Pennsylvania came to preach the gospel to the native people, and also to lead and resettle already converted native people migrating away from whites encroaching on their land in Pennsylvania. The earliest of these were Christian Frederick Post and John Heckewelder. See also the history of neighboring Tuscarawas County, Ohio

The first permanent settlements were established in 1805, beginning with Canton. Possibly 80% of the early settlers were German-speakers from Pennsylvania, although others came from Virginia, New York, and New England. Lumbering and sawmills were important early industries, to cater to the enormous demand for lumber from the incoming settlers. Stark County was originally part of Columbiana County, but was split off in 1807.

At the start of the Civil War the men of Stark County were quick to volunteer to preserve the Union. As of 1862 over 1,100 had enlisted.

During the early 20th century, Stark County was an important location in the early development of professional football. The rivalry between the Massillon Tigers and Canton Bulldogs helped bring the Ohio League to prominence in the mid-1900s (decade) and again in the late 1910s. The Bulldogs ended up a charter member of the National Football League, where it played for several years. (The role Stark County had in developing the game is part of the reason the Pro Football Hall of Fame is located in Canton.) Two relatively large football stadiums, Tom Benson Hall of Fame Stadium in Canton and Paul Brown Tiger Stadium in Massillon, are still in use (albeit now mostly for high school football), with Tom Benson Hall of Fame Stadium hosting the NFL's annual Pro Football Hall of Fame Game each year.

In the later 20th century, Stark County's voting record swung from one party to another, closely tracking the winner of the U.S. Presidential election. Even within the swing state of Ohio, Stark County is regarded as a quintessential bellwether, and thus presidential candidates have typically made multiple visits to the region. Major media outlets typically pay close attention to the election results in the county. The New York Times in particular has covered the county's citizens and their voting concerns in a series of features each election cycle for over a decade.

== Geography ==
According to the United States Census Bureau, the county has a total area of 581 square miles (1,500 km^{2}), of which 575 square miles (1,490 km^{2}) is land and 5.3 square miles (14 km^{2}) (0.9%) is water.

=== Adjacent counties ===
- Portage County (north)
- Mahoning County (northeast)
- Columbiana County (east)
- Carroll County (southeast)
- Tuscarawas County (south)
- Holmes County (southwest)
- Wayne County (west)
- Summit County (northwest)

=== Major highways ===
- I-77
- US 30
- US 62
- US 250
- SR 21
- SR 43
- SR 44
- SR 93
- SR 153
- SR 172
- SR 173
- SR 183
- SR 212
- SR 236
- SR 241
- SR 297
- SR 619
- SR 627
- SR 687
- SR 800

=== National protected area ===
- First Ladies National Historic Site

== Demographics ==
Historical population
| Census | Pop. | Note | %± |
|---|---|---|---|
| 1810 | 2,734 | | — |
| 1820 | 12,406 | | 353.8% |
| 1830 | 26,588 | | 114.3% |
| 1840 | 34,603 | | 30.1% |
| 1850 | 39,878 | | 15.2% |
| 1860 | 42,978 | | 7.8% |
| 1870 | 52,508 | | 22.2% |
| 1880 | 64,031 | | 21.9% |
| 1890 | 84,170 | | 31.5% |
| 1900 | 94,747 | | 12.6% |
| 1910 | 122,987 | | 29.8% |
| 1920 | 177,218 | | 44.1% |
| 1930 | 221,784 | | 25.1% |
| 1940 | 234,887 | | 5.9% |
| 1950 | 283,194 | | 20.6% |
| 1960 | 340,345 | | 20.2% |
| 1970 | 372,210 | | 9.4% |
| 1980 | 378,823 | | 1.8% |
| 1990 | 367,585 | | −3.0% |
| 2000 | 378,098 | | 2.9% |
| 2010 | 375,586 | | −0.7% |
| 2020 | 374,853 | | −0.2% |
| 2025 (est.) | 373,771 | ▼ | −0.3% |
U.S. decennial census 1790-1960 1900-1990; 1990–2000 2010-2020

=== 2020 census ===
As of the 2020 census, the county had a population of 374,853. The median age was 42.2 years. 21.3% of residents were under the age of 18 and 20.3% of residents were 65 years of age or older. For every 100 females there were 94.9 males, and for every 100 females age 18 and over there were 92.4 males age 18 and over.

The racial makeup of the county was 83.6% White, 7.8% Black or African American, 0.3% American Indian and Alaska Native, 0.9% Asian, <0.1% Native Hawaiian and Pacific Islander, 1.1% from some other race, and 6.4% from two or more races. Hispanic or Latino residents of any race comprised 2.8% of the population.

85.2% of residents lived in urban areas, while 14.8% lived in rural areas.

There were 155,392 households in the county, of which 27.0% had children under the age of 18 living in them. Of all households, 45.2% were married-couple households, 18.8% were households with a male householder and no spouse or partner present, and 28.2% were households with a female householder and no spouse or partner present. About 30.3% of all households were made up of individuals and 13.5% had someone living alone who was 65 years of age or older.

There were 166,799 housing units, of which 6.8% were vacant. Among occupied housing units, 67.6% were owner-occupied and 32.4% were renter-occupied. The homeowner vacancy rate was 1.3% and the rental vacancy rate was 7.4%.

=== Racial and ethnic composition ===
Stark County, Ohio – Racial and ethnic composition Note: the US Census treats Hispanic/Latino as an ethnic category. This table excludes Latinos from the racial categories and assigns them to a separate category. Hispanics/Latinos may be of any race.
| Race / Ethnicity (NH = Non-Hispanic) | Pop 1980 | Pop 1990 | Pop 2000 | Pop 2010 | Pop 2020 | % 1980 | % 1990 | % 2000 | % 2010 | % 2020 |
|---|---|---|---|---|---|---|---|---|---|---|
| White alone (NH) | 349,383 | 337,210 | 339,010 | 329,497 | 310,535 | 92.23% | 91.74% | 89.66% | 87.73% | 82.84% |
| Black or African American alone (NH) | 23,838 | 24,895 | 27,039 | 28,272 | 28,723 | 6.29% | 6.77% | 7.15% | 7.53% | 7.66% |
| Native American or Alaska Native alone (NH) | 531 | 920 | 873 | 808 | 721 | 0.14% | 0.25% | 0.23% | 0.22% | 0.19% |
| Asian alone (NH) | 1,049 | 1,507 | 2,040 | 2,736 | 3,175 | 0.28% | 0.41% | 0.54% | 0.73% | 0.85% |
| Native Hawaiian or Pacific Islander alone (NH) | x | x | 48 | 63 | 97 | x | x | 0.01% | 0.02% | 0.03% |
| Other race alone (NH) | 643 | 298 | 514 | 558 | 1,651 | 0.17% | 0.08% | 0.14% | 0.15% | 0.44% |
| Mixed race or Multiracial (NH) | x | x | 5,082 | 7,687 | 19,435 | x | x | 1.34% | 2.05% | 5.18% |
| Hispanic or Latino (any race) | 3,379 | 2,755 | 3,492 | 5,965 | 10,516 | 0.89% | 0.75% | 0.92% | 1.59% | 2.81% |
| Total | 378,823 | 367,585 | 378,098 | 375,586 | 374,853 | 100.00% | 100.00% | 100.00% | 100.00% | 100.00% |

=== 2010 census ===
As of the 2010 census, there were 375,586 people, 151,089 households, and 100,417 families living in the county. The population density was 652.9 inhabitants per square mile (252.1/km^{2}). There were 165,215 housing units at an average density of 287.2 units per square mile (110.9 units/km^{2}). The racial makeup of the county was 88.7% white, 7.6% black or African American, 0.7% Asian, 0.3% American Indian, 0.5% from other races, and 2.2% from two or more races. Those of Hispanic or Latino origin made up 1.6% of the population. In terms of ancestry, 33.6% were German, 15.5% were Irish, 10.1% were English, 10.1% were Italian, and 7.7% were American.

Of the 151,089 households, 30.2% had children under the age of 18 living with them, 49.2% were married couples living together, 12.7% had a female householder with no husband present, 33.5% were non-families, and 28.1% of all households were made up of individuals. The average household size was 2.42 and the average family size was 2.96. The median age was 41.1 years.

The median income for a household in the county was $44,941 and the median income for a family was $55,976. Males had a median income of $44,238 versus $31,896 for females. The per capita income for the county was $24,015. About 9.5% of families and 12.7% of the population were below the poverty line, including 19.5% of those under age 18 and 6.7% of those age 65 or over.

=== 2000 census ===
As of the census of 2000, there were 378,098 people, 148,316 households, and 102,782 families living in the county. The population density was 656 inhabitants per square mile (253/km^{2}). There were 157,024 housing units at an average density of 272 units per square mile (105 units/km^{2}). The racial makeup of the county was 90.28% white, 7.20% black or African American, 0.24% Native American, 0.54% Asian, 0.02% Pacific Islander, 0.29% from other races, and 1.43% from two or more races. 0.92% of the population were Hispanic or Latino of any race.

There were 148,316 households, out of which 31.00% had children under the age of 18 living with them, 54.20% were married couples living together, 11.50% had a female householder with no husband present, and 30.70% were non-families. 26.10% of all households were made up of individuals, and 10.90% had someone living alone who was 65 years of age or older. The average household size was 2.49 and the average family size was 3.00.

In the county, the population was spread out, with 24.80% under the age of 18, 8.30% from 18 to 24, 27.80% from 25 to 44, 24.00% from 45 to 64, and 15.10% who were 65 years of age or older. The median age was 38 years. For every 100 females there were 92.40 males. For every 100 females age 18 and over, there were 88.40 males.

The median income for a household in the county was $39,824, and the median income for a family was $47,747. Males had a median income of $37,065 versus $23,875 for females. The per capita income for the county was $20,417. About 6.80% of families and 9.20% of the population were below the poverty line, including 12.90% of those under age 18 and 6.60% of those age 65 or over.

== Politics ==
Stark County has often been described as "the swing county, in the swing state" when it comes to presidential elections. Locally, it has generally been a strong Republican area, but that changed in the 1990s and into the 2000s, where it remained highly competitive for both parties. In 1992, it became a swing county that tilted Democratic, and over the next 15–20 years more local office holders were Democrats. That has changed, however, in the last 10 years or so, beginning in 2010. Republicans now hold most of the local elected positions. Starting in 2016, the county began shifting more and more Republican, with Trump comfortably winning the county in all three of his presidential bids, each by a bigger margin than the last.

United States presidential election results for Stark County, Ohio
| Year | Republican | | Democratic | | Third party(ies) | |
| Year | No. | % | No. | % | No. | % |
|---|---|---|---|---|---|---|
| 1856 | 3,770 | 50.73% | 3,633 | 48.88% | 29 | 0.39% |
| 1860 | 4,064 | 52.98% | 2,820 | 36.76% | 787 | 10.26% |
| 1864 | 4,797 | 52.84% | 4,282 | 47.16% | 0 | 0.00% |
| 1868 | 5,601 | 53.10% | 4,948 | 46.90% | 0 | 0.00% |
| 1872 | 5,817 | 52.30% | 5,250 | 47.20% | 55 | 0.49% |
| 1876 | 6,410 | 48.16% | 6,772 | 50.88% | 128 | 0.96% |
| 1880 | 7,264 | 50.21% | 6,965 | 48.14% | 238 | 1.65% |
| 1884 | 8,315 | 49.62% | 7,955 | 47.47% | 487 | 2.91% |
| 1888 | 8,763 | 47.29% | 9,094 | 49.07% | 674 | 3.64% |
| 1892 | 9,231 | 44.79% | 10,227 | 49.63% | 1,150 | 5.58% |
| 1896 | 12,111 | 51.13% | 11,339 | 47.87% | 235 | 0.99% |
| 1900 | 13,165 | 54.12% | 10,651 | 43.79% | 509 | 2.09% |
| 1904 | 15,695 | 65.46% | 6,919 | 28.86% | 1,361 | 5.68% |
| 1908 | 14,112 | 50.48% | 12,286 | 43.95% | 1,559 | 5.58% |
| 1912 | 6,033 | 22.57% | 9,908 | 37.07% | 10,788 | 40.36% |
| 1916 | 14,159 | 45.23% | 15,316 | 48.93% | 1,828 | 5.84% |
| 1920 | 37,483 | 62.88% | 18,437 | 30.93% | 3,688 | 6.19% |
| 1924 | 40,858 | 64.28% | 12,544 | 19.74% | 10,160 | 15.98% |
| 1928 | 59,564 | 70.85% | 23,840 | 28.36% | 671 | 0.80% |
| 1932 | 40,672 | 51.06% | 35,757 | 44.89% | 3,225 | 4.05% |
| 1936 | 34,693 | 35.91% | 57,931 | 59.96% | 3,988 | 4.13% |
| 1940 | 46,384 | 43.81% | 59,496 | 56.19% | 0 | 0.00% |
| 1944 | 51,506 | 47.30% | 57,393 | 52.70% | 0 | 0.00% |
| 1948 | 51,482 | 51.40% | 47,533 | 47.46% | 1,135 | 1.13% |
| 1952 | 74,929 | 57.66% | 55,031 | 42.34% | 0 | 0.00% |
| 1956 | 83,667 | 62.85% | 49,445 | 37.15% | 0 | 0.00% |
| 1960 | 82,881 | 55.22% | 67,205 | 44.78% | 0 | 0.00% |
| 1964 | 53,632 | 37.68% | 88,704 | 62.32% | 0 | 0.00% |
| 1968 | 68,414 | 47.88% | 57,675 | 40.36% | 16,799 | 11.76% |
| 1972 | 92,110 | 62.74% | 51,565 | 35.12% | 3,135 | 2.14% |
| 1976 | 72,607 | 49.83% | 70,012 | 48.05% | 3,090 | 2.12% |
| 1980 | 87,769 | 55.87% | 59,005 | 37.56% | 10,332 | 6.58% |
| 1984 | 98,434 | 59.69% | 65,157 | 39.51% | 1,325 | 0.80% |
| 1988 | 87,087 | 55.08% | 69,639 | 44.05% | 1,370 | 0.87% |
| 1992 | 61,863 | 35.33% | 70,064 | 40.02% | 43,165 | 24.65% |
| 1996 | 60,212 | 38.03% | 73,437 | 46.38% | 24,697 | 15.60% |
| 2000 | 78,153 | 48.89% | 75,308 | 47.11% | 6,383 | 3.99% |
| 2004 | 92,215 | 48.93% | 95,337 | 50.59% | 907 | 0.48% |
| 2008 | 86,743 | 46.14% | 96,990 | 51.59% | 4,277 | 2.27% |
| 2012 | 88,581 | 48.74% | 89,432 | 49.21% | 3,733 | 2.05% |
| 2016 | 98,388 | 55.85% | 68,146 | 38.68% | 9,631 | 5.47% |
| 2020 | 111,097 | 58.44% | 75,904 | 39.93% | 3,092 | 1.63% |
| 2024 | 111,478 | 60.52% | 71,090 | 38.60% | 1,625 | 0.88% |

United States Senate election results for Stark County, Ohio1
| Year | Republican | | Democratic | | Third party(ies) | |
| Year | No. | % | No. | % | No. | % |
|---|---|---|---|---|---|---|
| 2024 | 99,365 | 54.67% | 75,434 | 41.51% | 6,941 | 3.82% |

== Government ==
=== Elected officials ===
- Commissioners: Alan Harold (R), Bill Smith (R), Richard Regula (R)
- Auditor: Angela Kinsey (R)
- Clerk of Courts: Lynn Todaro (R)
- Judges of the Court of Common Pleas: Hon. Kristin Farmer (R), Hon. Natalie Haupt (D), Hon. Taryn L. Heath (D), Hon. Francis G. Forchione (D), Hon Chryssa Hartnett (D)
- Coroner: Ron Rusnak M.D. (R)
- Engineer: Keith Bennett (D)
- Family Court: Hon. Rosemarie Hall (R), Michelle L. Cordova (D), Hon Matt Kreitzer (R)
- Probate Court: Hon. Curt Werren (R)
- Prosecutor: Kyle Stone (R)
- Recorder: Jamie Walters (R)
- Sheriff: Eric Weisburn (R)
- Treasurer: Alex Zumbar (R)

== Education ==
=== Colleges and universities ===
- Kent State University at Stark
- Malone University
- Stark State College
- University of Mount Union
- Walsh University

=== Technical/Career centers ===
- Stark County Area Vocational School District
- R. G. Drage Career Technical Center
- Sours Adult Career & Technical Center

=== Public school districts ===
- Alliance City School District
- Canton City School District
- Canton Local School District
- Fairless Local School District
- Jackson Local School District
- Lake Local School District
- Louisville City School District
- Marlington Local School District
- Massillon City School District
- Minerva Local School District
- North Canton City School District
- Northwest Local School District
- Osnaburg Local School District
- Perry Local School District
- Plain Local School District
- Sandy Valley Local School District
- Tuslaw Local School District

=== Private school districts ===
- Stark County Catholic Schools

=== High schools ===
- Alliance High School
- Canton McKinley High School
- Canton South High School
- Central Catholic High School
- Early College High School
- East Canton High School
- Fairless High School
- GlenOak High School
- Hoover High School
- Indian River High School
- Jackson High School
- Lake Center Christian School
- Lake Middle/High School
- Louisville High School
- Marlington High School
- Massillon Christian School
- Minerva High School
- Northwest High School
- Perry High School
- St. Thomas Aquinas High School
- Washington High School

== Communities ==
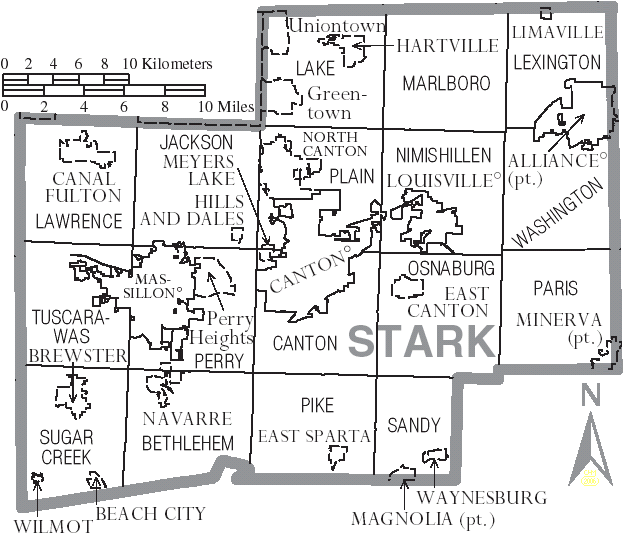
Map of Stark County, Ohio with municipal and township labels

=== Cities ===
- Alliance
- Canal Fulton
- Canton (county seat)
- Louisville
- Massillon
- North Canton

=== Villages ===
- Beach City
- Brewster
- East Canton
- East Sparta
- Hartville
- Hills and Dales
- Magnolia
- Minerva
- Meyers Lake
- Navarre
- Waynesburg
- Wilmot

=== Townships ===
Prior to 1815, Stark County consisted of only eight large townships. After a number of partitions and a few transfers between counties, the townships are:

- Bethlehem
- Canton
- Jackson
- Lake
- Lawrence
- Lexington
- Marlboro
- Nimishillen
- Osnaburg
- Paris
- Perry
- Pike
- Plain
- Sandy
- Sugar Creek
- Tuscarawas
- Washington

=== Census-designated places ===
- Bolton
- Greentown
- Limaville
- Marlboro
- Middlebranch
- North Industry
- North Lawrence
- Perry Heights
- Reedurban
- Richville
- Robertsville
- Uniontown

=== Unincorporated communities ===
- Avondale
- Cairo
- Crystal Springs
- East Greenville
- Freeburg
- Harrisburg
- Justus
- Mapleton
- Marchand
- Maximo
- McDonaldsville
- New Baltimore
- New Franklin
- Newman
- Paris
- Pigeon Run
- Sippo
- Waco

== See also ==
- National Register of Historic Places listings in Stark County, Ohio
