= Maximo, Ohio =

Unincorporated community in Ohio, U.S.

Coordinates: 40°52′35″N 81°10′19″W

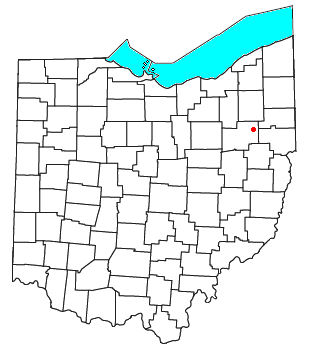
Location of Maximo, Ohio

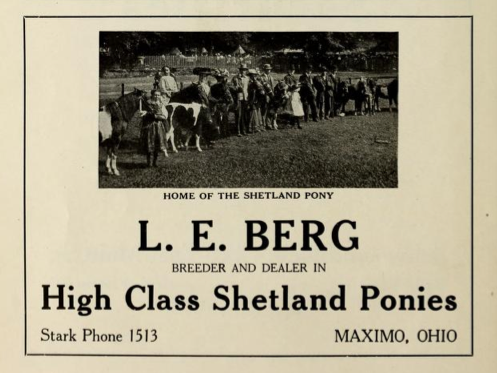
1915 ad for Shetland pony breeder and dealer

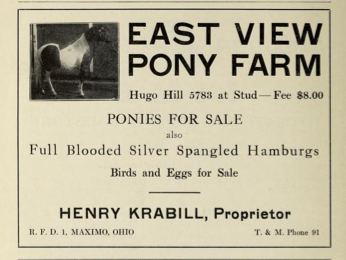
1915 advertisement for East View Pony Farm

Maximo is an unincorporated community in northwestern Washington Township, Stark County, Ohio, United States. It has a post office with the ZIP code 44650. The community is part of the Canton–Massillon Metropolitan Statistical Area.

== History ==
Maximo was originally called Strasburg, and under the latter name was platted in 1842. Maximo's name is derived from the fact that it was a high point on the Pittsburgh-Fort Wayne rail line. A post office called Maximo has been in operation since 1853.
