= Nimishillen Township, Stark County, Ohio =

Township in Ohio, US

Nimishillen Township
- Civil township
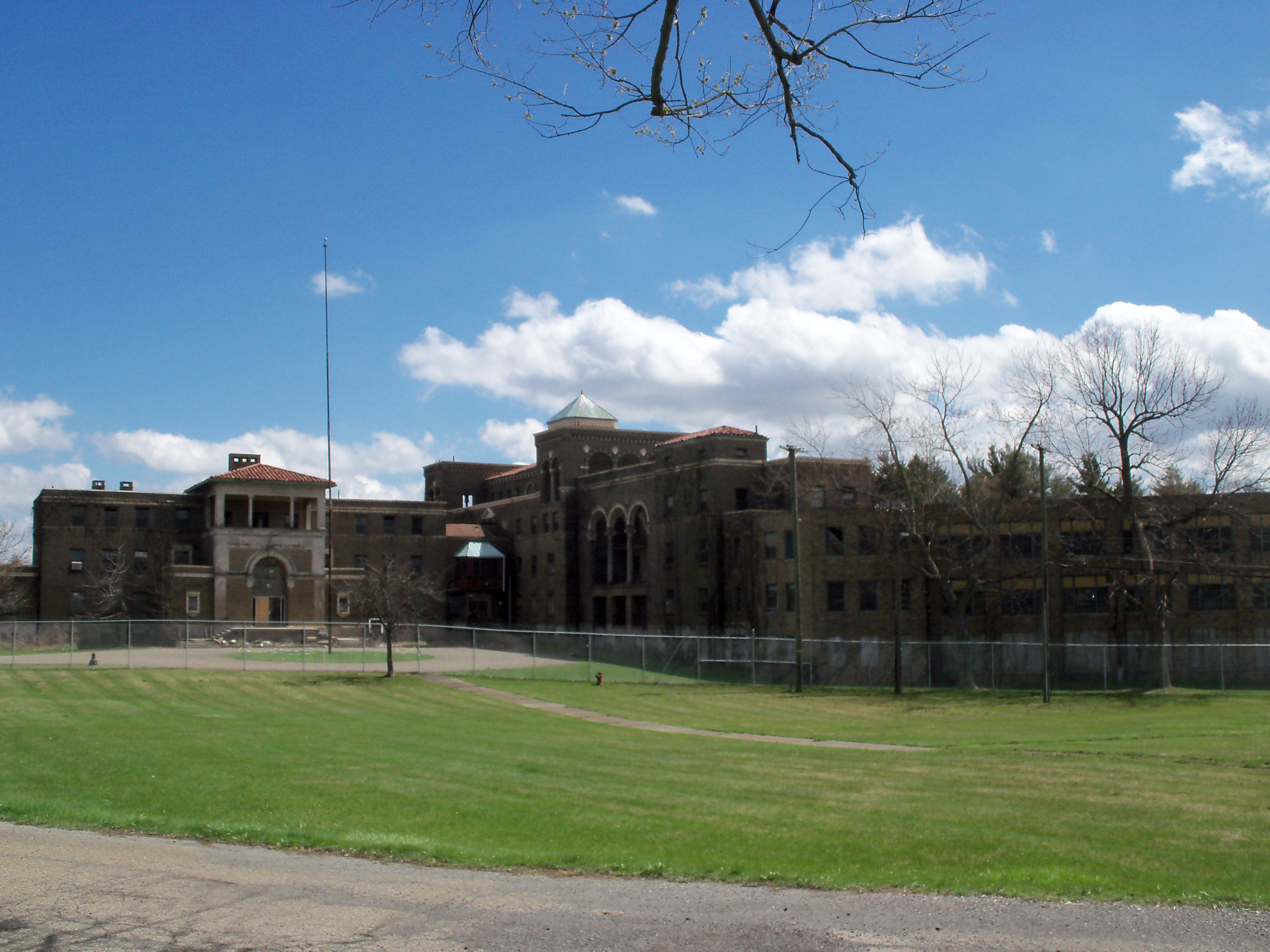
- Molly Stark Sanitarium on Columbus Road

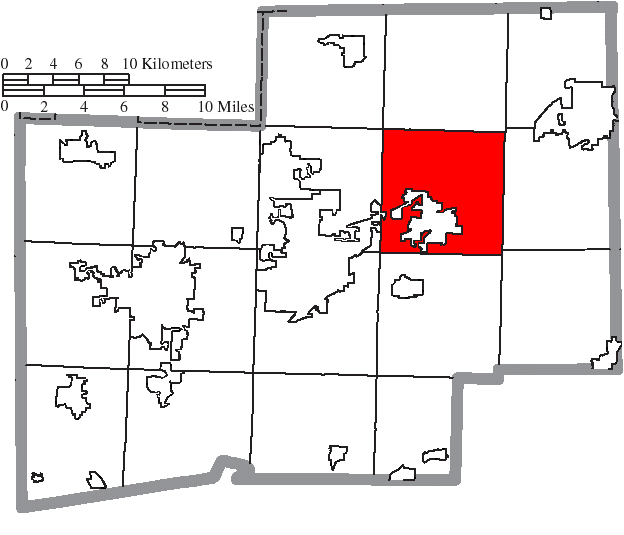
- Location of Nimishillen Township in Stark County
- Coordinates: 40°50′56″N 81°16′14″W
- Country: United States
- State: Ohio
- County: Stark
- Organized: 16 March 1809

Area
  - Total: 31.7 sq mi (82.1 km^{2})
  - Land: 31.6 sq mi (81.9 km^{2})
  - Water: 0.077 sq mi (0.2 km^{2})
- Elevation: 1,145 ft (349 m)

Population (2020)
  - Total: 9,354
  - Density: 296/sq mi (114.2/km^{2})
- Time zone: UTC-5 (Eastern (EST))
  - Summer (DST): UTC-4 (EDT)
- FIPS code: 39-55944
- GNIS feature ID: 1086983
- Website: https://www.nimishillentownship.gov/

Nimishillen Township is one of the seventeen townships in Stark County, Ohio, United States. According to the 2020 census, the township had a population of 9,354.

== Geography ==
Located in the eastern part of the county, it borders the following townships:

- Marlboro Township - north
- Washington Township - east
- Paris Township - southeast
- Osnaburg Township - south
- Canton Township - southwest corner
- Plain Township - west
- Lake Township - northwest corner

Two cities are located in Nimishillen Township: Louisville in the south, and a small part of Canton, the county seat of Stark County, in the southwest.

== Name ==
It is the only Nimishillen Township in the state. According to tradition, Nimishillen Township was named after the Nimishillen Creek that takes its rise mainly in the township. This stream was originally named by local Native Americans, as a combination of missilla (black alder, or American Winterberry, a common tree along the stream) plus ni (stream or water).

== History ==
The first settlers arrived in the area between 1805 and 1807, founding Nimishillentown, and organizing Nimishillen Township in 1809.

Its earliest trustees, elected in 1809, were Jacob Shively, Jesse Fetts and John Gans. Other early township officials were township clerk John Rupert; constable James Coney; treasurer Mathias Bower; appraiser of property Isaac Clay; overseer of the poor George Shidler; fence supervisor John Miller; and road supervisor Michael Miller.

The courts were composed of juries chosen by the trustees and presided over by Justices of the Peace. Schools were also established by the township, and for this purpose the trustees carried out a census of heads of households. Early township clerks were responsible for recording livestock brands, apprenticeship indentures, and the names of men whose wives required them not to use alcohol.

In 1833, Nimishillen Township contained one gristmill, five saw mills, two tanneries, and one store.

== Government ==
The township is governed by a three-member board of trustees, who are elected in November of odd-numbered years to a four-year term beginning on the following January 1. Two are elected in the year after the presidential election and one is elected in the year before it. There is also an elected township fiscal officer, who serves a four-year term beginning on April 1 of the year after the election, which is held in November of the year before the presidential election. Vacancies in the fiscal officership or on the board of trustees are filled by the remaining trustees.

== Education ==
The township is split into two school districts. Most of Nimishillen Township's students attend school within the Louisville City School District. Plain Local School District serves students within the far northwestern corner of the township.

== Parks and recreation ==
Molly Stark Park, which is named after the wife of Major General John Stark. It is located at 7900 Columbus Road on the former grounds of the Molly Stark Hospital, between Louisville and Harrisburg. The hospital memorialized Molly Stark by using her home as a treatment center for Revolutionary War soldiers.

=== Library ===
The Louisville Public Library serves Nimishillen Township.
