= Freeburg, Ohio =

Unincorporated community in Ohio, U.S.

Coordinates: 40°50′2″N 81°8′52″W

Freeburg is an unincorporated community in Washington Township, Stark County, in the U.S. state of Ohio.

== History ==
Freeburg was platted in 1842. Lack of railroad facilities inhibited the town's growth. A post office called Freeburgh was established in 1855, the name was changed to Freeburg in 1894, and the post office closed in 1906.

== Geography ==
The community is located 6 miles east from OH-44 in Louisville, Ohio by OH-153 near the intersection of Beechwood Avenue Northeast (CR-105). The highest point in Stark County is located south of the community in Paris Township.
