= Hartville, Ohio =

- Village
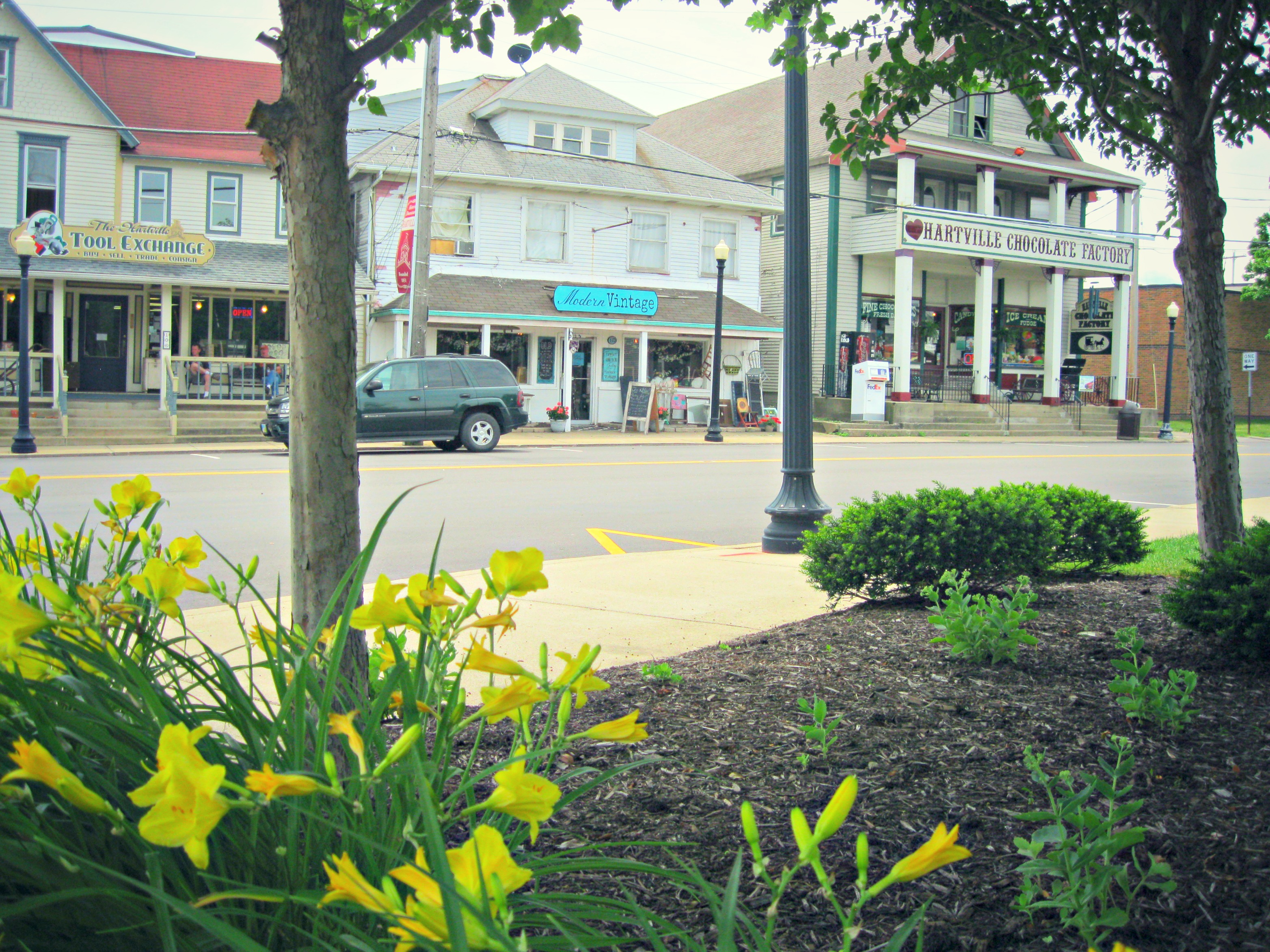
- Downtown Hartville in the spring

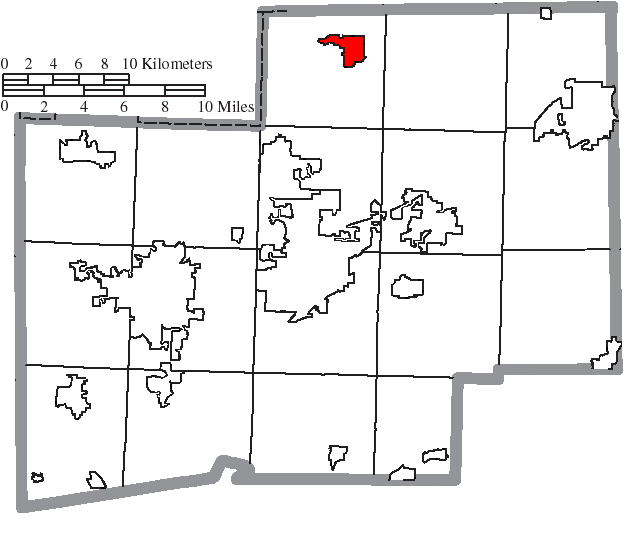
- Location of Hartville in Stark County, Ohio

- Location within Ohio Location within the United States
- Coordinates: 40°57′42″N 81°20′05″W
- Country: United States
- State: Ohio
- County: Stark
- Township: Lake

Area
  - Total: 2.70 sq mi (6.99 km^{2})
  - Land: 2.70 sq mi (6.99 km^{2})
  - Water: 0 sq mi (0.00 km^{2})
- Elevation: 1,161 ft (354 m)

Population (2020)
  - Total: 3,329
  - Estimate (2023): 3,385
  - Density: 1,233.8/sq mi (476.38/km^{2})
- Time zone: UTC-5 (Eastern (EST))
  - Summer (DST): UTC-4 (EDT)
- ZIP code: 44632
- Area code: 330
- FIPS code: 39-34328
- GNIS feature ID: 2398260
- Website: www.hartvilleoh.com

Hartville is a village in northern Stark County, Ohio, United States. The population was 3,329 at the 2020 census. It is part of the Canton–Massillon metropolitan area. Hartville lies halfway between Akron and Canton at the intersection of State Routes 43 and 619.

== History ==
Hartville was founded by settler John Morehart in 1818 and first platted in 1851. Its name is likely a portmanteau of the surnames of Morehart and fellow settler John Willis. Hartville was incorporated as a village in 1951.

== Geography ==
According to the United States Census Bureau, the village has a total area of 2.58 square miles (6.68 km^{2}), all land.

== Demographics ==
Historical population
Census	Pop.	Note	%±
1880	135		—
1960	1,353		—
1970	1,752		29.5%
1980	1,772		1.1%
1990	2,031		14.6%
2000	2,174		7.0%
2010	2,944		35.4%
2020	3,329		13.1%
2023 (est.)	3,385	▲	1.7%
U.S. Decennial Census

=== 2020 census ===
As of the 2020 census, Hartville had a population of 3,329. The median age was 40.7 years. 24.9% of residents were under the age of 18 and 21.3% of residents were 65 years of age or older. For every 100 females there were 90.3 males, and for every 100 females age 18 and over there were 86.5 males age 18 and over.

99.5% of residents lived in urban areas, while 0.5% lived in rural areas.

There were 1,389 households in Hartville, of which 30.5% had children under the age of 18 living in them. Of all households, 47.9% were married-couple households, 16.1% were households with a male householder and no spouse or partner present, and 31.0% were households with a female householder and no spouse or partner present. About 31.0% of all households were made up of individuals and 16.7% had someone living alone who was 65 years of age or older.

There were 1,455 housing units, of which 4.5% were vacant. The homeowner vacancy rate was 1.2% and the rental vacancy rate was 4.5%. The population density was 1,159.8 inhabitants per square mile (447.8/km^{2}). The average family size was 2.8.

Racial composition as of the 2020 census
Race	Number	Percent
White	3,056	91.8%
Black or African American	26	0.8%
American Indian and Alaska Native	21	0.6%
Asian	23	0.7%
Native Hawaiian and Other Pacific Islander	1	0.0%
Some other race	14	0.4%
Two or more races	188	5.6%
Hispanic or Latino (of any race)	55	1.7%

=== 2010 census ===
As of the census of 2010, there were 2,944 people, 1,154 households, and 806 families living in the village. The population density was 1,141.1 inhabitants per square mile (440.6/km^{2}). There were 1,276 housing units at an average density of 494.6 per square mile (191.0/km^{2}). The racial makeup of the village was 96.1% White, 0.8% African American, 0.1% Native American, 0.7% Asian, 0.5% from other races, and 1.9% from two or more races. Hispanic or Latino of any race were 1.0% of the population.

There were 1,154 households, of which 36.0% had children under the age of 18 living with them, 51.4% were married couples living together, 14.3% had a female householder with no husband present, 4.2% had a male householder with no wife present, and 30.2% were non-families. 26.5% of all households were made up of individuals, and 11.6% had someone living alone who was 65 years of age or older. The average household size was 2.52 and the average family size was 3.06.

The median age in the village was 38 years. 26.8% of residents were under the age of 18; 9.2% were between the ages of 18 and 24; 24% were from 25 to 44; 25.6% were from 45 to 64; and 14.5% were 65 years of age or older. The gender makeup of the village was 47.2% male and 52.8% female.

=== 2000 census ===
As of the census of 2000, there were 2,174 people, 863 households, and 579 families living in the village. The population density was 1,186.2 inhabitants per square mile (458.0/km^{2}). There were 902 housing units at an average density of 492.2 per square mile (190.0/km^{2}). The racial makeup of the village was 98.39% White, 0.28% African American, 0.18% Native American, 0.18% Asian, 0.05% Pacific Islander, 0.28% from other races, and 0.64% from two or more races. Hispanic or Latino of any race were 0.83% of the population.

There were 863 households, out of which 33.6% had children under the age of 18 living with them, 52.1% were married couples living together, 12.3% had a female householder with no husband present, and 32.9% were non-families. 28.0% of all households were made up of individuals, and 8.3% had someone living alone who was 65 years of age or older. The average household size was 2.49 and the average family size was 3.09.

In the village, the population was spread out, with 26.9% under the age of 18, 10.1% from 18 to 24, 32.4% from 25 to 44, 19.6% from 45 to 64, and 11.0% who were 65 years of age or older. The median age was 34 years. For every 100 females there were 95.9 males. For every 100 females age 18 and over, there were 91.3 males.

The median income for a household in the village was $41,012, and the median income for a family was $47,411. Males had a median income of $34,821 versus $22,679 for females. The per capita income for the village was $19,362. About 6.2% of families and 9.2% of the population were below the poverty line, including 12.7% of those under age 18 and 4.9% of those age 65 or over.

== Notable people ==
- Aaron Brumbaugh, president of Shimer College
- Andrew Wellington Cordier, a United Nations official and President of Columbia University
