= Atwater (CDP), Ohio =

Atwater, Ohio
- CDP
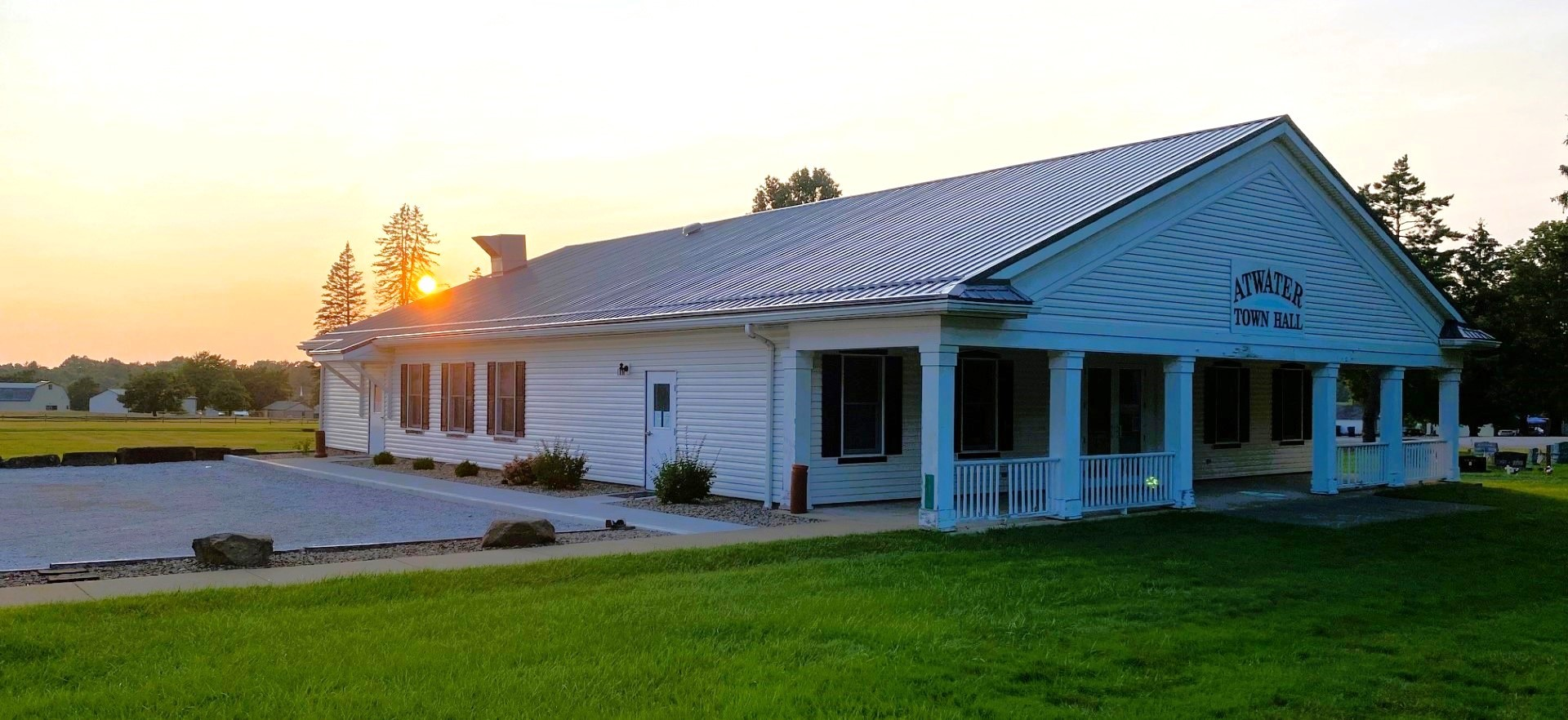
- Interactive map of Atwater, Ohio
- Coordinates: 41°01′33″N 81°09′36″W
- Country: United States
- State: Ohio
- County: Portage

Area
  - Total: 1.06 sq mi (2.74 km^{2})
  - Land: 1.05 sq mi (2.71 km^{2})
  - Water: 0.012 sq mi (0.03 km^{2})
- Elevation: 1,152 ft (351 m)

Population (2020)
  - Total: 776
  - Density: 741.5/sq mi (286.29/km^{2})
- Time zone: UTC-5 (Eastern (EST))
  - Summer (DST): UTC-4 (EDT)
- ZIP Code: 44201
- Area codes: 330, 234
- FIPS code: 39-02848
- GNIS feature ID: 2628859

Atwater is a census-designated place (CDP) in Portage County, Ohio, United States. As of the 2020 census, the CDP had a population of 776. It is located in the central part of Atwater Township, of which it is a part.

Atwater is part of the Akron Metropolitan Statistical Area.

== History ==
A post office called Atwater has been in operation since 1824. The community and township have the name of Caleb Atwater, a landowner in the Connecticut Western Reserve.

== Demographics ==
Historical population
Census	Pop.	Note	%±
2020	776		—
U.S. Decennial Census
