= Lexington Township, Stark County, Ohio =

Township in Ohio, US

- Township
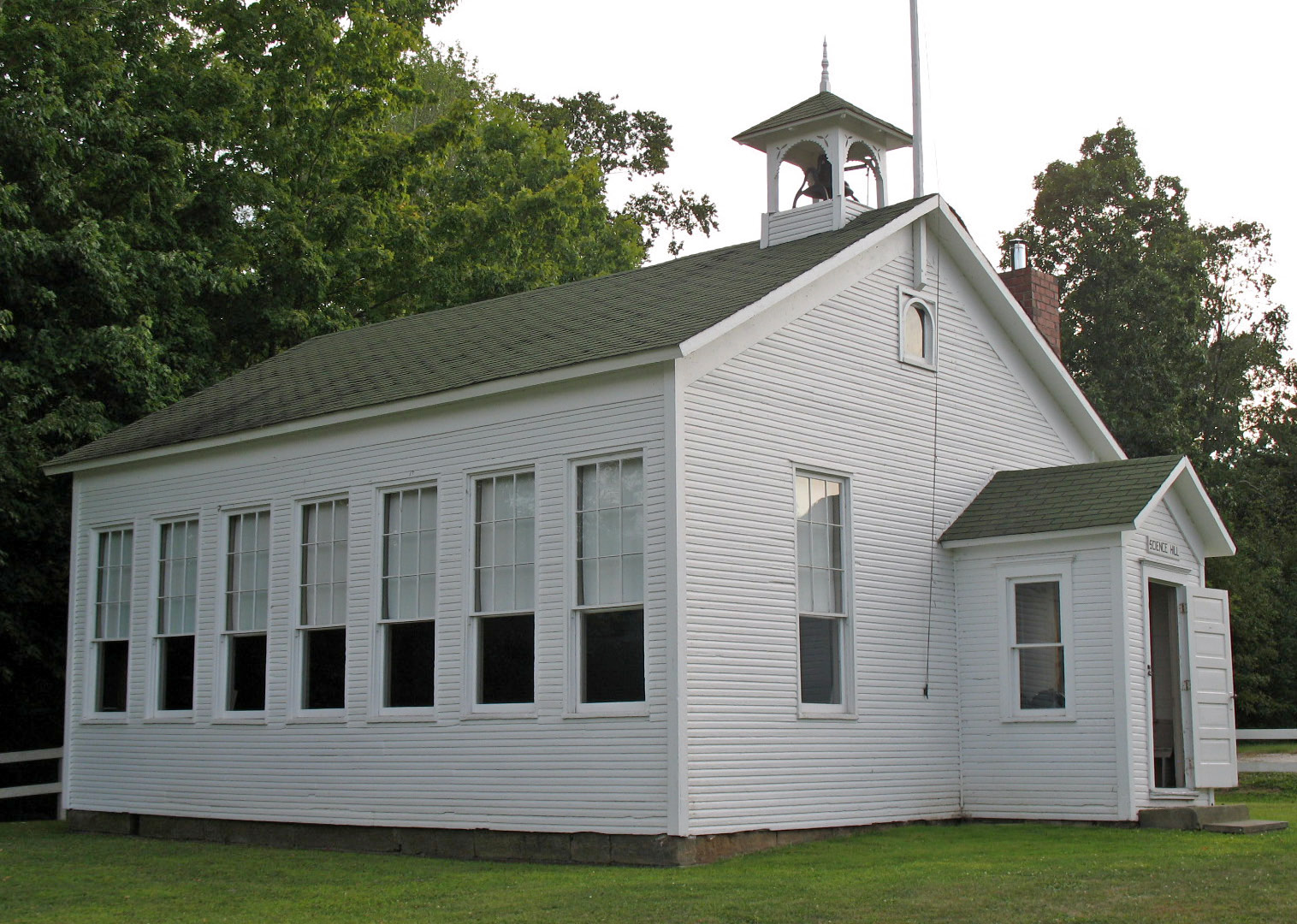
- Science Hill School

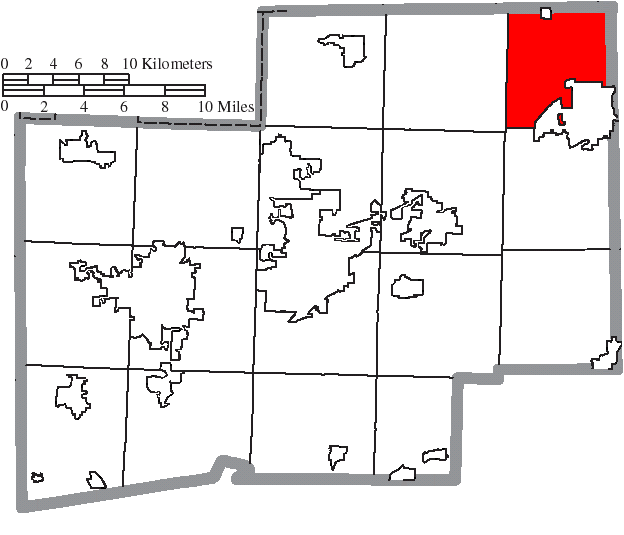
- Location of Lexington Township in Stark County
- Coordinates: 40°56′57″N 81°7′45″W
- Country: United States
- State: Ohio
- County: Stark

Area
  - Total: 24.7 sq mi (64.0 km^{2})
  - Land: 23.0 sq mi (59.6 km^{2})
  - Water: 1.7 sq mi (4.3 km^{2})
- Elevation: 1,060 ft (323 m)

Population (2020)
  - Total: 4,925
  - Density: 214/sq mi (82.6/km^{2})
- Time zone: UTC-5 (Eastern (EST))
  - Summer (DST): UTC-4 (EDT)
- FIPS code: 39-43022
- GNIS feature ID: 1086979
- Website: https://lexingtontwpstarkco.com/

Lexington Township is one of the seventeen townships of Stark County, Ohio, United States. The 2020 census found 4,925 people in the township.

== Geography ==
Located in the northeastern corner of the county, it borders the following townships and city:

- Atwater Township, Portage County - north
- Deerfield Township, Portage County - northeast
- Smith Township, Mahoning County - east
- Alliance - southeast
- Washington Township - south
- Marlboro Township - west

It is the only township in the county with a border on Mahoning County.

The city of Alliance is in the southeast. The census-designated places of Limaville and Bolton lie in the north and the center of the township, respectively.

== Name and history ==
It is the only Lexington Township statewide.

In 1833, Lexington Township contained three gristmills, seven saw mills, one tannery, and four stores.

== Government ==
Historical population
| Census | Pop. | Note | %± |
|---|---|---|---|
| 1820 | 539 | | — |
| 1830 | 869 | | 61.2% |
| 1840 | 1,640 | | 88.7% |
| 1850 | 1,996 | | 21.7% |
| 1860 | 3,102 | | 55.4% |
| 1870 | 5,700 | | 83.8% |
| 1880 | 6,287 | | 10.3% |
| 1890 | 8,994 | | 43.1% |
| 1900 | 10,325 | | 14.8% |
| 1910 | 16,700 | | 61.7% |
| 1920 | 22,241 | | 33.2% |
| 1930 | 23,712 | | 6.6% |
| 1940 | 23,292 | | −1.8% |
| 1950 | 27,578 | | 18.4% |
| 1960 | 29,074 | | 5.4% |
| 1970 | 5,975 | | −79.4% |
| 1990 | 5,291 | | — |
| 2000 | 5,583 | | 5.5% |

The township is governed by a three-member board of trustees, who are elected in November of odd-numbered years to a four-year term beginning on the following January 1. Two are elected in the year after the presidential election and one is elected in the year before it. There is also an elected township fiscal officer, who serves a four-year term beginning on April 1 of the year after the election, which is held in November of the year before the presidential election. Vacancies in the fiscal officership or on the board of trustees are filled by the remaining trustees.
