= Marlboro Township, Stark County, Ohio =

Township in Ohio, US

- Township
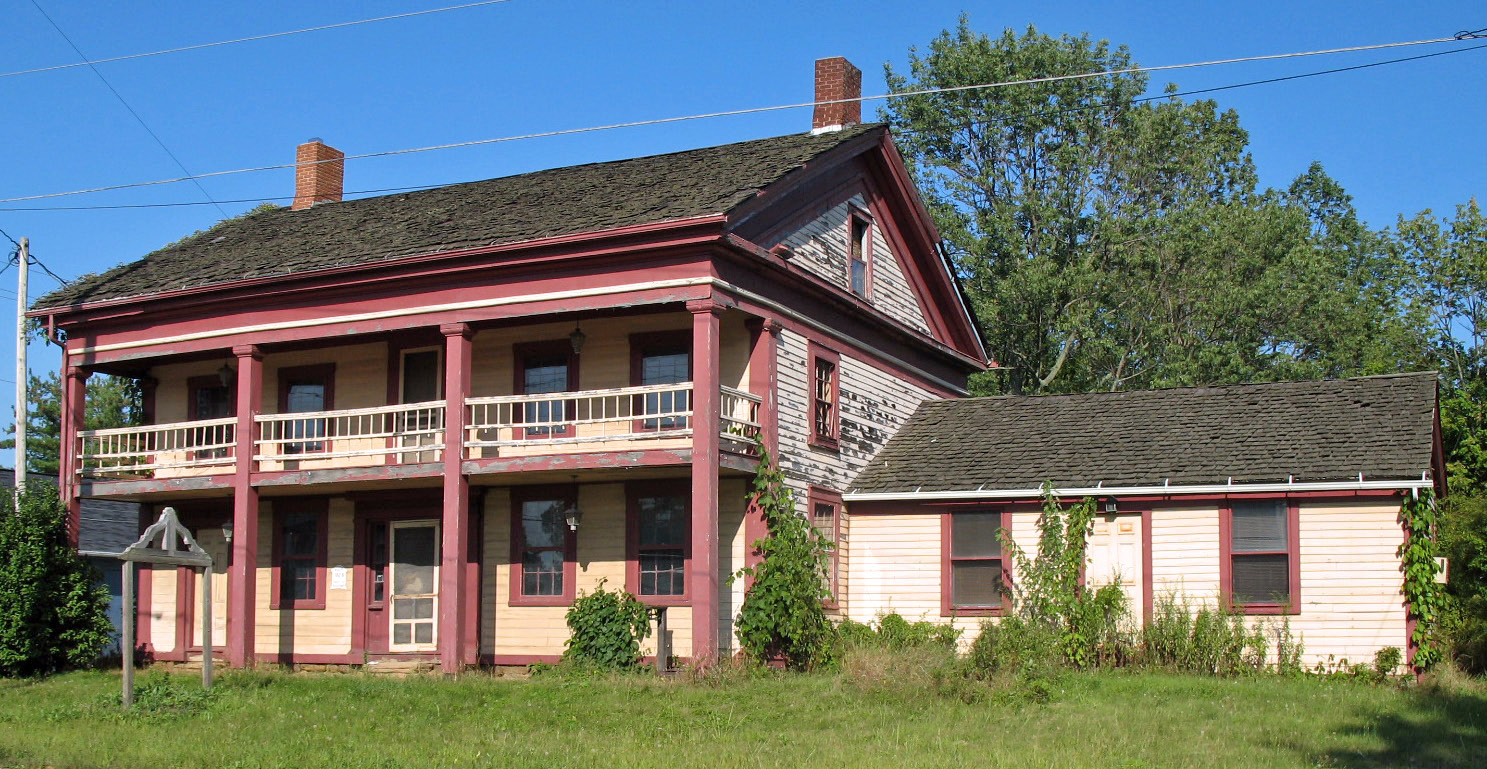
- New Baltimore Inn

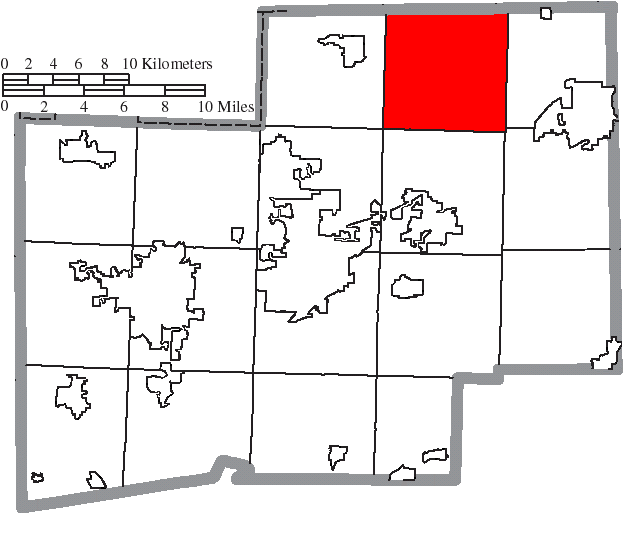
- Location of Marlboro Township in Stark County
- Coordinates: 40°56′44″N 81°14′30″W
- Country: United States
- State: Ohio
- County: Stark

Area
  - Total: 36.4 sq mi (94.4 km^{2})
  - Land: 35.8 sq mi (92.8 km^{2})
  - Water: 0.62 sq mi (1.6 km^{2})
- Elevation: 1,217 ft (371 m)

Population (2020)
  - Total: 4,277
  - Density: 119/sq mi (46.1/km^{2})
- Time zone: UTC-5 (Eastern (EST))
  - Summer (DST): UTC-4 (EDT)
- FIPS code: 39-47936
- GNIS feature ID: 1086981
- Website: https://www.marlborotownship.org/

Marlboro Township is one of the seventeen townships of Stark County, Ohio, United States. The 2020 census found 4,277 people in the township.

== Geography ==
Located in the northern part of the county, it borders the following townships:

- Randolph Township, Portage County - north
- Atwater Township, Portage County - northeast
- Lexington Township - east
- Washington Township - southeast
- Nimishillen Township - south
- Plain Township - southwest corner
- Lake Township - west

No municipalities are located in Marlboro Township, although the unincorporated community of Marlboro is located in the township's east.

== Name and history ==
Statewide, the only other Marlboro Township is located in Delaware County.

Marlboro Township was historically also spelled Marlborough. In 1833, Marlborough Township contained three stores, one tannery, and four saw mills.
