= Ohio State Route 153 =

State highway in Stark County, Ohio, US

State Route 153

Route information
- Maintained by ODOT
- Length: 14.69 mi (23.64 km)
- Existed: 1932–present

Major junctions
- West end: SR 43 in Canton
- SR 44 in Louisville
- East end: SR 183 near Alliance

Location
- Country: United States
- State: Ohio
- Counties: Stark

Highway system
- Ohio State Highway System; Interstate; US; State; Scenic
← SR 152	→ SR 154

State Route 153 (SR 153) is a 14.69-mile (23.64 km) long east–west state highway in the northeastern portion of the U.S. state of Ohio. The western terminus of SR 153 is at a signalized intersection with southbound SR 43 in Canton, along a stretch of SR 43 where that highway is divided into a one-way couplet. SR 153 has its eastern endpoint at SR 183 nearly 4 miles (6.4 km) south of Alliance.

== Route description ==
Established in 1932, it runs from its western terminus at State Route 43 in Canton to its eastern terminus at State Route 183 near Alliance. While this route plays a role in regional transportation, it is not part of the National Highway System (NHS).

== History ==
The SR 153 designation was established in 1932. Its original routing consisted of the portion of the existing alignment of SR 153 between its western terminus at SR 43 in Canton and its junction with SR 44 in Louisville. SR 153 replaced what was a portion of SR 44 before that highway was re-routed to continue due south from Louisville toward East Canton. In 1937, SR 153 was extended east from Louisville to its present eastern terminus at SR 183, which at the time carried the SR 80 designation. The extension utilized a county-maintained roadway.

== Major intersections ==
The entire route is in Stark County.

Location	mi	km	Destinations	Notes
Canton	0.00	0.00	SR 43 south (Walnut Avenue)	Western terminus at one-way street; road continues as 12th Street NW
Canton	0.10	0.16	SR 43 north (Cherry Avenue)	One-way street
Louisville	6.25	10.06	SR 44 (Chapel Street)	
Washington Township	14.69	23.64	SR 183 (Union Avenue) – Minerva, Alliance	Eastern terminus; road continues as Louisville Street
1.000 mi = 1.609 km; 1.000 km = 0.621 mi
