= Limaville, Ohio =

- Census-designated place
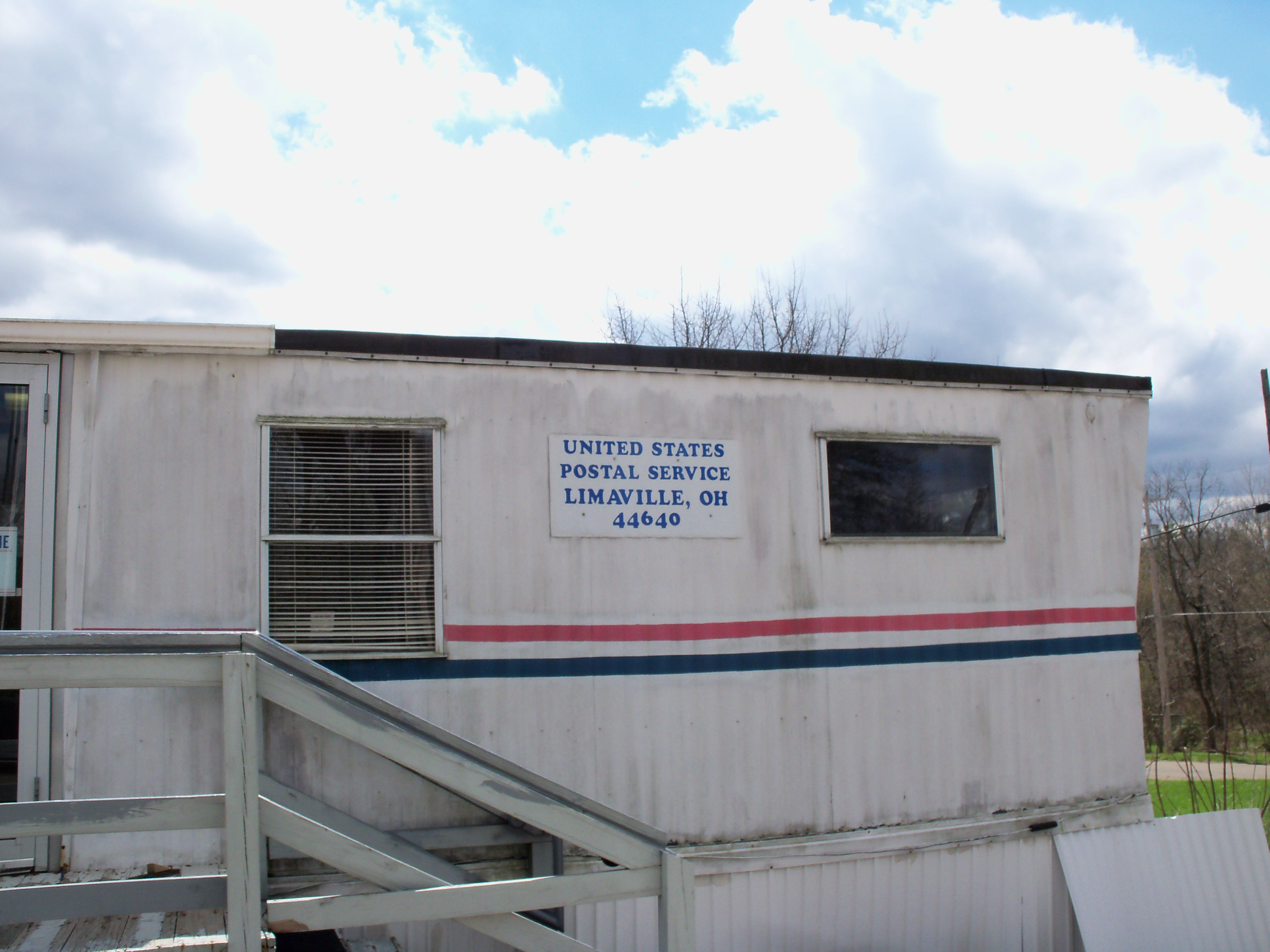
- Limaville Post Office

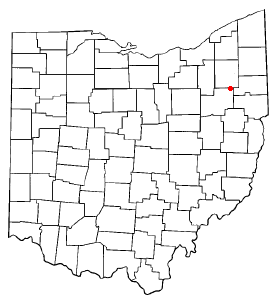
- Location of Limaville, Ohio

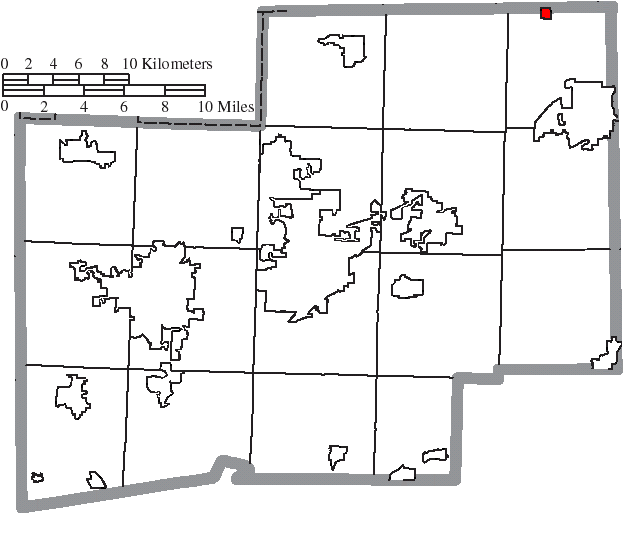
- Location of Limaville in Stark County
- Coordinates: 40°59′04″N 81°08′54″W
- Country: United States
- State: Ohio
- County: Stark
- Township: Lexington

Area
  - Total: 0.26 sq mi (0.68 km^{2})
  - Land: 0.25 sq mi (0.66 km^{2})
  - Water: 0.0039 sq mi (0.01 km^{2})
- Elevation: 1,086 ft (331 m)

Population (2020)
  - Total: 151
  - Density: 589.1/sq mi (227.46/km^{2})
- Time zone: UTC-5 (Eastern (EST))
  - Summer (DST): UTC-4 (EDT)
- ZIP code: 44640
- Area code: 330
- FIPS code: 39-43596
- GNIS feature ID: 2804868

Limaville (/ˈlaɪməvɪl/ LY-mə-vil) is a census-designated place (CDP) and former village in Stark County, Ohio, United States. The population was 151 at the 2020 census. It is part of the Canton–Massillon Metropolitan Statistical Area.

== Geography ==
According to the United States Census Bureau, the village has a total area of 0.28 square miles (0.73 km^{2}), of which 0.27 square miles (0.70 km^{2}) is land and 0.01 square miles (0.03 km^{2}) is water.

== Demographics ==
Historical population
Census	Pop.	Note	%±
1870	204		—
1880	164		−19.6%
1890	172		4.9%
1900	156		−9.3%
1910	136		−12.8%
1920	183		34.6%
1930	195		6.6%
1940	209		7.2%
1950	209		0.0%
1960	226		8.1%
1970	303		34.1%
1980	164		−45.9%
1990	152		−7.3%
2000	193		27.0%
2010	151		−21.8%
2020	151		0.0%
U.S. Decennial Census

=== 2010 census ===
As of the census of 2010, there were 151 people, 60 households, and 44 families living in the village. The population density was 559.3 inhabitants per square mile (215.9/km^{2}). There were 65 housing units at an average density of 240.7 per square mile (92.9/km^{2}). The racial makeup of the village was 98.0% White and 2.0% African American. Hispanic or Latino of any race were 0.7% of the population.

There were 60 households, of which 35.0% had children under the age of 18 living with them, 53.3% were married couples living together, 10.0% had a female householder with no husband present, 10.0% had a male householder with no wife present, and 26.7% were non-families. 25.0% of all households were made up of individuals, and 13.4% had someone living alone who was 65 years of age or older. The average household size was 2.52 and the average family size was 2.86.

The median age in the village was 42.2 years. 25.8% of residents were under the age of 18; 6.5% were between the ages of 18 and 24; 22.5% were from 25 to 44; 24.6% were from 45 to 64; and 20.5% were 65 years of age or older. The gender makeup of the village was 52.3% male and 47.7% female.

=== 2000 census ===
As of the census of 2000, there were 193 people, 71 households, and 59 families living in the village. The population density was 707.4 inhabitants per square mile (273.1/km^{2}). There were 74 housing units at an average density of 271.2 per square mile (104.7/km^{2}). The racial makeup of the village was 97.41% White, 0.52% Native American, 1.55% from other races, and 0.52% from two or more races. Hispanic or Latino of any race were 3.63% of the population.

There were 71 households, out of which 39.4% had children under the age of 18 living with them, 64.8% were married couples living together, 14.1% had a female householder with no husband present, and 15.5% were non-families. 11.3% of all households were made up of individuals, and 2.8% had someone living alone who was 65 years of age or older. The average household size was 2.72 and the average family size was 2.88.

In the village, the population was spread out, with 24.9% under the age of 18, 8.3% from 18 to 24, 29.5% from 25 to 44, 22.3% from 45 to 64, and 15.0% who were 65 years of age or older. The median age was 38 years. For every 100 females there were 112.1 males. For every 100 females age 18 and over, there were 113.2 males.

The median income for a household in the village was $37,750, and the median income for a family was $37,083. Males had a median income of $21,875 versus $23,125 for females. The per capita income for the village was $15,026. About 10.6% of families and 8.5% of the population were below the poverty line, including 14.0% of those under the age of eighteen and 10.0% of those 65 or over.
