= Sippo, Ohio =

Unincorporated community in Ohio, U.S.

Coordinates: 40°48′59″N 81°36′5″W

Sippo is an unincorporated community in Stark County, in the U.S. state of Ohio.

== History ==
A post office called Sippo was established in 1882, and remained in operation until 1905. The community takes its name from nearby Sippo Creek.
