= Canton Local School District =

School district in Ohio

Canton Local School District is a school district in a suburb south of Canton, Ohio, United States. It is a public school district for the students living in the area of Canton Township and Pike Township. The area is commonly referred to as "Canton South".

== Schools ==
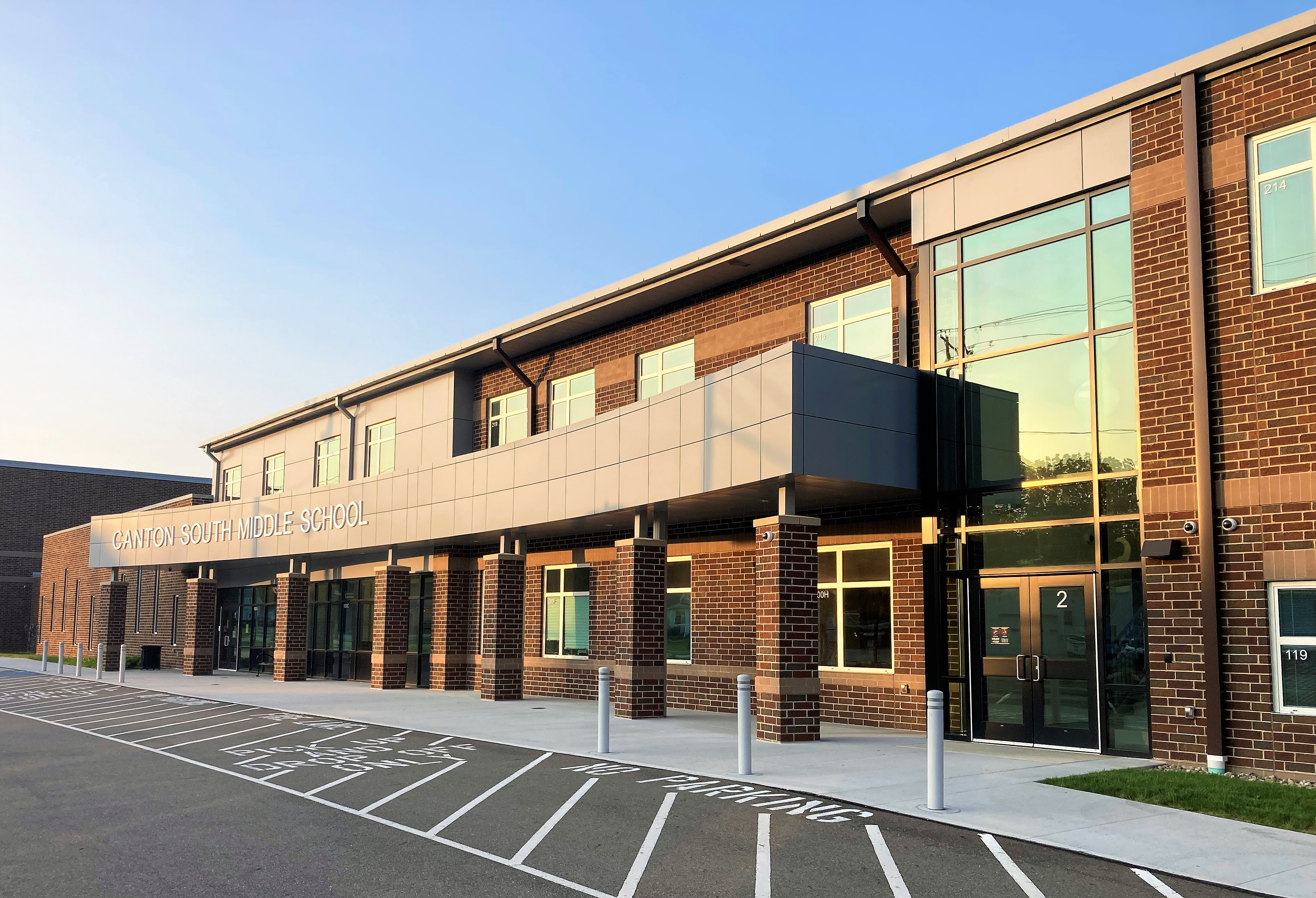
Canton South Middle School

The school district is made up of Canton South High School, Canton South Middle School and Faircrest Elementary School.

== Former schools ==
Walker elementary was the district middle school until 1984, and the district had five other schools: Waco Elementary, Trump Elementary, Prairie College Elementary, Amos McDannel Elementary and North Industry Elementary. Waco Elementary was sold to a private owner, Trump Elementary was converted into the Rosemary Johnson Child Development Center (named for the former principal of the school), North Industry Elementary school was shut down, Amos McDannel Elementary was sold to the township fire department and Prairie College Elementary was demolished in 2014. When these schools left the district, Walker Middle School was converted to Walker Elementary, and the student body from the five schools was consolidated over time.
