= Ohio & Erie Canalway Scenic Byway =

Scenic route in Ohio, U.S.

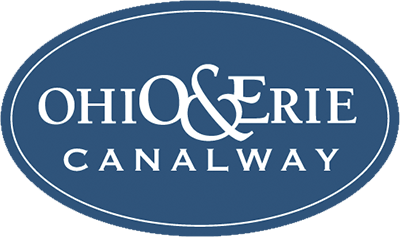
Ohio & Erie Canalway Scenic Byway

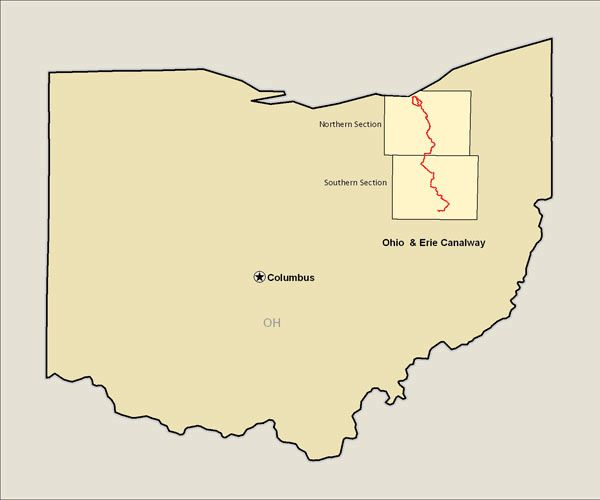

Route information
- Maintained by ODOT
- Length: 110 mi (180 km)

Location
- Country: United States
- State: Ohio
- Counties: Cuyahoga, Summit, Stark, Tuscarawas

Highway system
- Ohio State Highway System; Interstate; US; State; Scenic

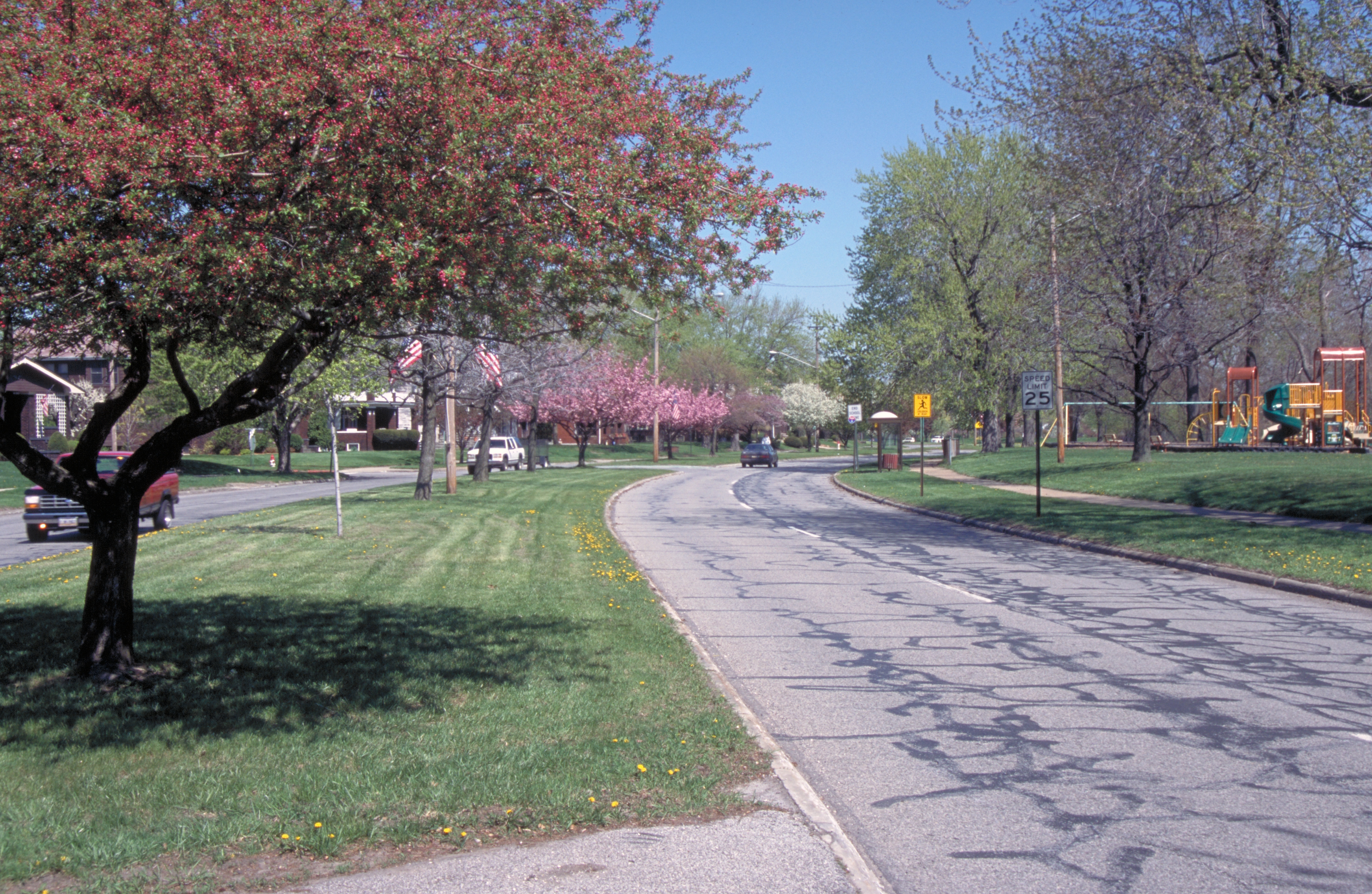
The route in Cleveland

The Ohio & Erie Canalway Scenic Byway is a 110-mile (177 km) scenic byway located within the Ohio & Erie Canalway National Heritage Area in Northeast Ohio.

The scenic byway begins in Cleveland and ends in New Philadelphia, with a spur connecting Massillon and Canton. Between Cleveland and Cuyahoga Valley National Park, the byway is split between three routes. The western route runs through four historic Cleveland neighborhoods: Ohio City, Tremont, Brooklyn Centre, and South Brooklyn. The central route runs through Cleveland's industrial area. The eastern route runs through Cleveland's historic Warehouse District and along Broadway Avenue. The rest of the route follows the Ohio and Erie Canal through cities ranging from large, industrial cities such as Cleveland, Akron, Barberton, and Massillon to small, quaint villages such as Peninsula, Clinton, Navarre, Bolivar, and Zoar.
