= Ohio & Erie Canalway =

Ohio & Erie Canalway may refer to:

- Ohio & Erie Canalway National Heritage Area, a federally designated heritage area in northeastern Ohio
- Ohio & Erie Canalway Scenic Byway, a scenic route in northeastern Ohio
- Ohio and Erie Canal Towpath Trail, a multiuse trail in northeastern Ohio

== See also ==
- Ohio and Erie Canal
