= Tinkers Creek (Cuyahoga River tributary) =

Tinker's Creek

Location
- Country: United States of America

Physical characteristics
- Source
  - coordinates: 41°11′46″N 81°22′49″W near Ohio State Route 43 in Sugar Bush Knolls, Ohio
  - elevation: 874.5 ft (266.5 m)
- Mouth
  - coordinates: 41°21′54″N 81°36′35″W Cuyahoga River
  - elevation: 610 ft (190 m)
- Length: 28.2 mi (45.4 km)
- Basin size: 96.4 mi^{2} (250 km^{2})

Tinker's Creek, in Cuyahoga, Summit and Portage counties of Ohio, is the largest tributary of the Cuyahoga River, providing about a third of its flow into Lake Erie.

== History ==
Tinker's Creek was named after Captain Joseph Tinker, the principal boatsman of Moses Cleaveland's survey crew, who died in a boating accident while returning to New England in the fall of 1797.

=== Tinker's Creek Gorge ===
Thousands of years ago, when the Wisconsinian Glaciation retreated, dips and valleys like Tinker's Creek Gorge 41°22′37″N 081°33′30″W Elevation: 896 feet (273.1 m) were created due to erosion in the underlying shale. The sloped gorge sculpted by Tinker's Creek became a National Natural Landmark in 1967. A raised viewpoint over the gorge is easily accessible from the Gorge Parkway in the Cleveland Metroparks' Bedford Reservation. The stream is sometimes run in whitewater kayaks.

=== Great Falls ===
The continuous downward flow of water erodes the underlying shale faster than the harder sandstone, causing sandstone outcropping collapses and features such as the 25-ft-high Great Falls of Tinker's Creek or Gates Mills Falls 41°23′01″N 81°31′56″W Elevation: 853 feet (260.0 m), in Bedford, Ohio.

== Tinker's Creek Aqueduct ==
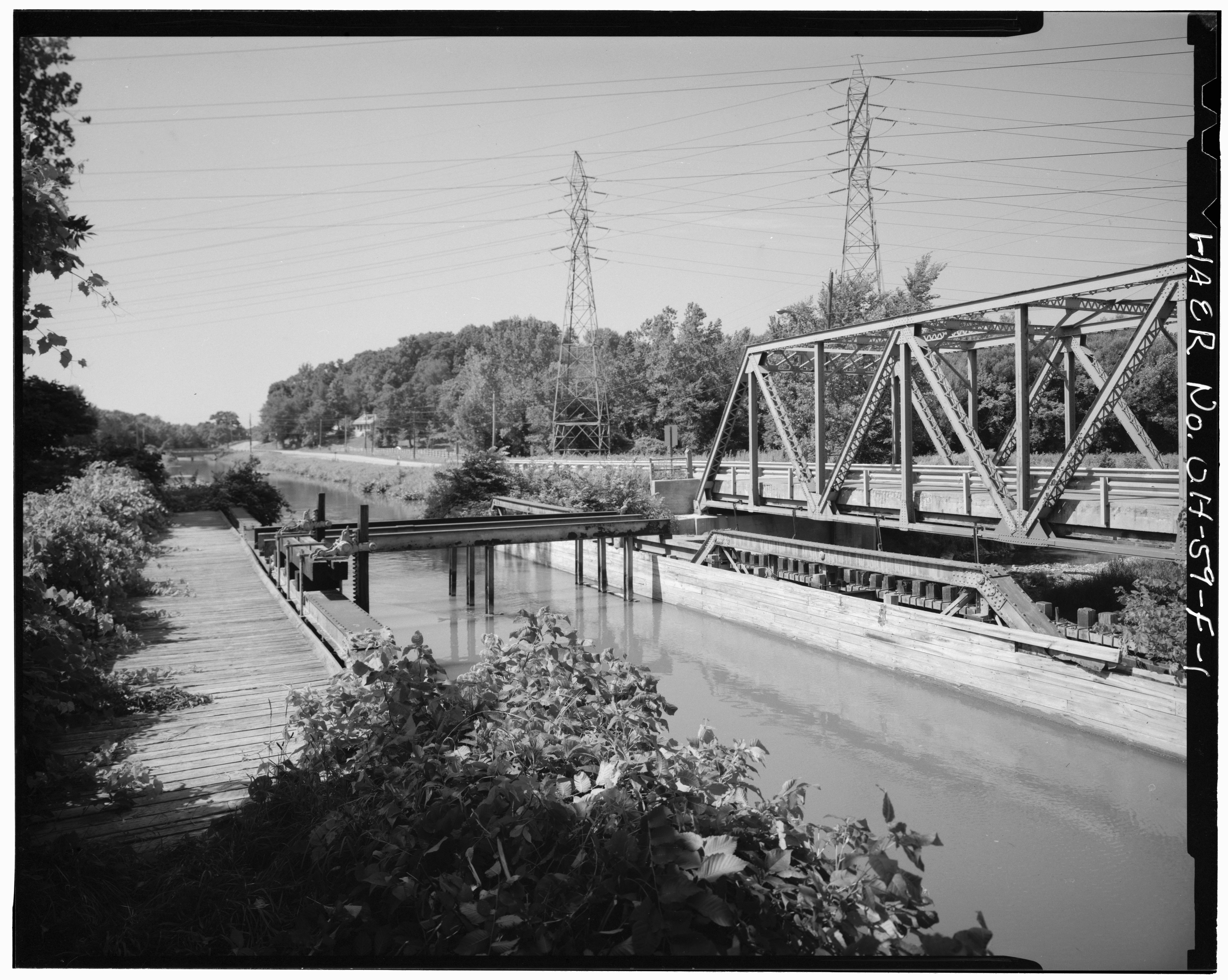
Tinker's Creek Aqueduct, Canal Road, South Tinkers Creek Road, Valley View, Cuyahoga County, OH

Tinker's Creek Aqueduct 41°21′53″N 81°36′32″W Elevation: 610 feet (185.9 m), on the National Register of Historic Places, was built to bridge the Ohio and Erie Canal over Tinker's Creek near its confluence with the Cuyahoga River. The aqueduct and surrounding area are subject to flooding by the Cuyahoga River and Tinker's Creek.

== Tinker's Creek Viaduct ==
Tinker's Creek Viaduct 41°23′05″N 81°32′03″W Elevation: 920 feet (280.4 m), on the National Register of Historic Places, was a railroad trestle built to span Tinker's Creek near the Great Falls. A 510-foot-long stone archway was later built to channel the creek through the gorge, which was filled with landfill for the construction of a newer two-track railway. The top of the viaduct is still visible.

== Watershed ==
Tinker's Creek is the largest tributary of the Cuyahoga River, the river which flows through Cleveland and into Lake Erie. Because of its glacial history, the course of the Cuyahoga River is unusual: it rises in Geauga County, Ohio, flows southward into the city of Akron, Ohio, and then abruptly turns northward and flows into Lake Erie. Its course is shaped like a reversed "J," and Tinker's Creek, entering from the east, drains almost all of the land nestled in the hook of the "J" that does not drain directly into the Cuyahoga.

The creek itself rises near Tinker's Creek State Park in Streetsboro, Portage County. The creek then flows through Twinsburg Township and Twinsburg in Summit County, and Glenwillow, Oakwood, Bedford Heights, Bedford, and Walton Hills in Cuyahoga County before its confluence with the Cuyahoga River in Valley View village near Independence.

The 24 municipalities within the watershed are:

Cuyahoga County

- Beachwood
- Bedford
- Bedford Heights
- Glenwillow
- Highland Heights
- Maple Heights
- North Randall
- Oakwood
- Orange
- Solon
- Valley View
- Walton Hills
- Warrensville Heights

Geauga County

- Bainbridge Township

Portage County

- Aurora
- Franklin Township
- Streetsboro
- Sugar Bush Knolls

Summit County

- Hudson Village
- Macedonia
- Northfield
- Reminderville
- Twinsburg
- Twinsburg Township

Organizations

- Tinker's Creek Watershed Partners

=== Tributaries ===
Tinker's Creek has eight major tributaries and countless unnamed smaller tributaries. From the headwaters moving downstream, the major tributaries are:

- Bell Run
- Hudson Springs
- Pond Brook
- Beaver Meadow Run
- Mud Creek
- Hawthorne Creek
- Deer Lick Run
- Wood Run

=== Geology ===
The walls of the Tinker's Creek valley expose four geologic layers. The youngest sediments, unconsolidated glacial till deposited on top of bedrock by the retreat of the Wisconsin glaciation 12,000 years ago, occur in the upper portion of the watershed. These poorly sorted and poorly drained materials largely account for the marshes, swamps, bogs and fens that characterize the headwaters of the creek.

Further downstream, at the Great Falls, the creek plunges over a cliff of Berea sandstone composed of tiny quartz crystals cemented with clay. Berea sandstone is about 330 million years old (Mississippian), and was generated by rivers bearing sand from higher ground to the east and north and depositing it in fan-shaped deltas in an ocean. These deltas eventually dried and were buried under subsequent sediments where they hardened into a layer of resistant rock.

Cleveland shale (350 million years old; Devonian) underlies the sandstone. The shale is composed of extremely fine bits of quartz, clay and mica deposited at the edge of a sea. Ripple marks created by the sea's wave action are visible in the shale. The Cleveland shale is less resistant to erosion than the overlying Berea sandstone, so the creek was able to scour its impressive gorge once it had penetrated the sandstone cap—a process still occurring at the Great Falls.

Downstream of the gorge, approaching the creek's confluence with the Cuyahoga River, the creek has begun to reveal Chagrin Shale, bluish-gray and opaque, laid down 360 million years ago.

=== Water pollution ===
Tinker's Creek has substantial pollution due to its industrial history.

=== Whitewater ===
Despite water pollution, whitewater kayakers consider it one of the most demanding and enjoyable streams in Ohio.

== See also ==
- List of National Natural Landmarks
- Tinker's Creek State Park
- List of rivers of Ohio

== Notes ==
'A: Elevation at Great Falls is' 853 feet (260 m) and at Tinker's Creek Gorge Overlook on the rim of the gorge is 896 feet (273 m). Elevation at Tinker's Creek State Park is 1,004 feet (306 m).
