= Canal Fulton, Ohio =

- City
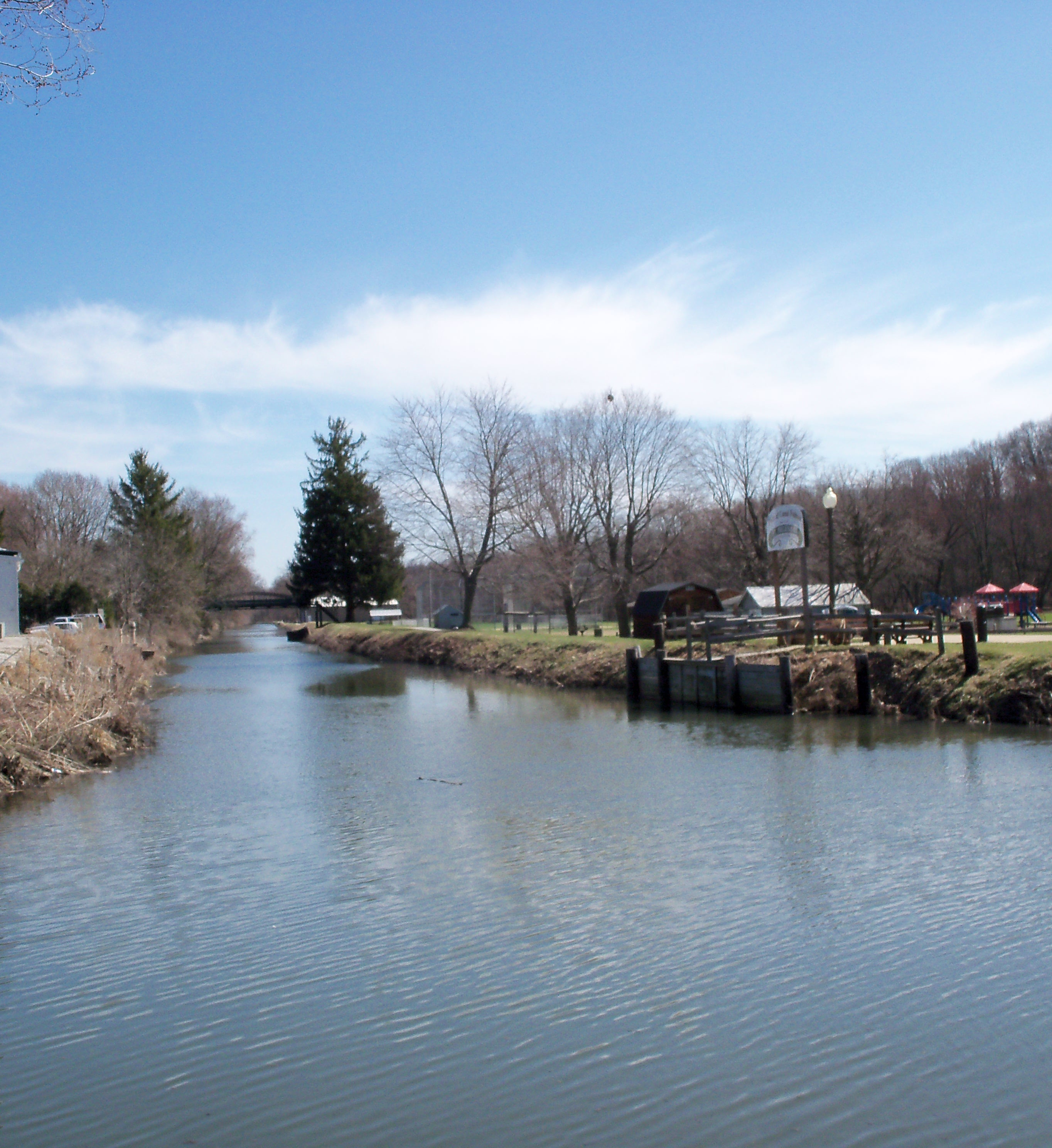
- Along the Ohio and Erie Canal

- Seal Logo

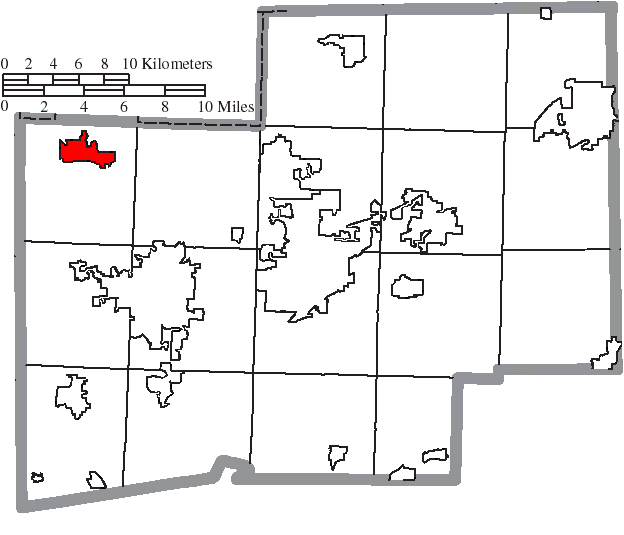
- Location of Canal Fulton in Stark County

- Location within Ohio Location within the United States
- Coordinates: 40°53′23″N 81°35′43″W
- Country: United States
- State: Ohio
- County: Stark

Area
  - Total: 3.47 sq mi (9.00 km^{2})
  - Land: 3.41 sq mi (8.84 km^{2})
  - Water: 0.062 sq mi (0.16 km^{2})
- Elevation: 971 ft (296 m)

Population (2020)
  - Total: 5,325
  - Estimate (2023): 5,333
  - Density: 1,561/sq mi (602.7/km^{2})
- Time zone: UTC-05:00 (Eastern (EST))
  - Summer (DST): UTC-04:00 (EDT)
- ZIP code: 44614
- Area code: 330
- FIPS code: 39-11304
- GNIS feature ID: 2393726
- Website: www.cityofcanalfulton-oh.gov

Canal Fulton is a city in western Stark County, Ohio, United States, along the Tuscarawas River. The population was 5,325 at the time of the 2020 census. It is part of the Canton–Massillon metropolitan area.

== History ==
Canal Fulton traces its history to three villages that developed along the Tuscarawas River. Milan was platted on March 23, 1814, by Matthew Rowland who arrived by ox team. It was the first settlement west of the Tuscarawas River in Stark County. Fulton was platted on May 16, 1826, changed its name to Canal Fulton in 1832, and later incorporated as a village. The present name is an amalgamation of the Ohio Canal and the name of a local pioneer, Ben Fulton. In 1843, President John Quincy Adams visited.

=== Indigenous displacement ===
The land that would become Canal Fulton was part of broader territories shared between several Native American tribes, including Wyandot, Lenape (Delaware), Shawnee, Odawa (Ottawa), Ojibwe (Chippewa), Potawatomi, Miami, Eel River, Wea, Kickapoo, Piankishaw, Munsee, and Kaskaskia.

The United States pressed these nations to cede territory to the west of the Tuscarawas in 1785 and to the east in 1805, paving the way for settlers like Rowland to claim divisions.

The Treaty of Fort McIntosh in 1785 claimed land west of the Ohio to the Tuscarawas from Wyandot, Delaware, Shawnee, Ottawa, Chippewa, Potawatomi, Miami, Eel River, Wea, Kickapoo, Piankishaw, and Kaskaskia Native Americans. The Land Ordinance of 1785 set the precedent for the division and distribution of these lands.

With the Treaty of Fort Industry in July 4, 1805, Wyandot, Ottawa, Chippewa, Munsee, Delaware, Shawnee, and Potawatomi land east of the Tuscarawas was claimed by the United States and made open to white settlers.

With the Treaty of Maumee Rapids in 1817 and the Treaty of St. Mary’s in 1818, all lands in Ohio were claimed by the United States.

=== Frontier life ===
In the County of Stark just outside the Connecticut Western Reserve, on lands known as the Congress Lands, frontier life was dangerous and difficult. Settlers encountered Native Americans attempting to defend their families and territory, confrontations with wild beasts, and difficulty in transportation.

Settlers arrived on canoe or foot from Cleveland by way of the Cuyahoga to the Portage to the Tuscarawas rivers or by ox-drawn cart following the state road from Pennsylvania to Canton then cutting wider Indian trails to their destination.

=== Land survey ===
Foresighted surveyors while platting Stark County had included “Fractions” of land west of the Tuscarawas. The surveying went according to the laws of the Land Ordinance of 1785, which provided for six-mile square townships to be created in the newly acquired land, the township would then be divided into one-square mile sections, with each section encompassing 640 acres. Each section received its own number. Section sixteen was set aside for a public school. The federal government reserved sections eight, eleven, twenty-six, and twenty-nine to provide veterans of the American Revolution with land bounties for their service during the war. The government would sell the remaining sections at public auction. The minimum bid was 640 dollars per section or one dollar for every acre of land in each section.

The fraction in the northwest part of Stark County was settled before the land on the east bank of the Tuscarawas. The west side of the river was chosen because of the roads that already existed (old Cleveland-Massillon Road also known as the “army road” or “territorial road” because it was cut during the War of 1812, when the Government needed access to Fort Meigs). Also, it was believed the west side had better quality soil. However, the primary reason the west side of river was chosen was because east of the Tusc, the surveys were in two-section areas (with additional surveying the responsibility of the settler) and west of the River the surveys were done on a one-section basis. Most settlers only wanted to farm (and purchase) a one-section area.

=== Rowland's purchase ===
Matthew Rowland purchased one of these fractions of land and recorded the proprietorship at Canton on March 23, 1814. Rowland platted the town and offered the 79 lots for sale at a public auction in Canton.

The town was named Milan, after the Lombardian city of Milan in Italy. It was fashionable at the time to name frontier towns after European cities (witness Paris, Ohio, founded in Stark two months before Milan).

=== Developing the region ===
Rowland’s son-in-law built the first structure in Milan (a log cabin), and Rowland soon added a gristmill and a sawmill. Neither was very successful.

The Township that Milan would become a part of was laid off in December 1815. Lawrence Township was named after Captain James Lawrence famous for his last words during the War of 1812 battle between the American Chesapeake, and the British frigate the Shannon, “Don’t Give up the Ship”. These words are now the township’s motto.

Milan was the only village in the township until the building of the canal between 1826 and 1828, which brought about the town of Fulton on the other side of the river. Milan boasted churches, cemeteries, and a grocery built to service the hundreds of canal workers. Fulton surpassed Milan though and the prefix Canal was added.

For a brief time with the coming of the B & O railroad, Milan once again eclipsed the Port of Canal Fulton. American transportation such as it is, even this balance was tipped again because all the main highways favored the Fulton side of the river. Today Milan no longer exists as it incorporated into Canal Fulton in 1853. It is, however, a quiet residential area, and most in Canal Fulton are aware of the little village’s beginnings.

In 1850 the first permanent community school began operation and railroad operations began. In 1853, Canal Fulton absorbed both Milan and West Fulton. In 1855, Union School building was completed and had two rooms accommodating 100 students. In 1869, the construction of railroad was completed on the west side of the river. 1870 Addition built at Union School. In 1873, The warehouse converted to Opera House. In 1874, Canal Fulton approves organization of a fire department, although one was in existence in the early 1800s. Fire department gets first modern steam-operated pumper. In 1875, Sts. Philip and James School founded.

In 1876, German immigrants came to area as strikebreakers for coal industry. In 1886, new school built to accommodate 12 grades.

== Geography ==
Canal Fulton is located along the Tuscarawas River.

According to the United States Census Bureau, the city has a total area of 3.32 square miles (8.60 km^{2}), of which 3.26 square miles (8.44 km^{2}) is land and 0.06 square miles (0.16 km^{2}) is water.

== Demographics ==
Historical population
Census	Pop.	Note	%±
1870	1,048		—
1880	1,196		14.1%
1890	1,173		−1.9%
1900	1,172		−0.1%
1910	978		−16.6%
1920	1,057		8.1%
1930	1,160		9.7%
1940	1,115		−3.9%
1950	1,258		12.8%
1960	1,555		23.6%
1970	2,367		52.2%
1980	3,481		47.1%
1990	4,157		19.4%
2000	5,061		21.7%
2010	5,479		8.3%
2020	5,325		−2.8%
2025 (est.)	5,412		1.6%

As of the 2020 census, Canal Fulton had a population of 5,325 and a median age of 44.4 years; 19.6% of residents were under the age of 18 and 23.7% were 65 years of age or older, and there were 89.2 males for every 100 females, with 84.0 males for every 100 females age 18 and over.

=== Racial and ethnic composition ===
Racial composition as of the 2020 census
Race	Number	Percent
White	4,984	93.6%
Black or African American	37	0.7%
American Indian and Alaska Native	7	0.1%
Asian	30	0.6%
Native Hawaiian and Other Pacific Islander	4	0.1%
Some other race	22	0.4%
Two or more races	241	4.5%
Hispanic or Latino (of any race)	98	1.8%

=== 2020 census ===
There were 2,266 households in Canal Fulton, of which 26.4% had children under the age of 18 living in them; 47.8% were married-couple households, 14.7% were households with a male householder and no spouse or partner present, and 30.8% were households with a female householder and no spouse or partner present. About 29.6% of all households were made up of individuals and 15.0% had someone living alone who was 65 years of age or older.

There were 2,378 housing units, of which 4.7% were vacant. Among occupied housing units, 64.8% were owner-occupied and 35.2% were renter-occupied. The homeowner vacancy rate was 0.8% and the rental vacancy rate was 4.3%.

Of the city's residents, 99.6% lived in urban areas while 0.4% lived in rural areas.

Of those residents age 25 and older, 95.8% had graduated high school or higher and 27.5% had earned their Bachelor's degree or higher.

=== 2010 census ===
As of the census of 2010, there were 5,479 people, 2,186 households, and 1,488 families residing in the city. The population density was 1,680.7 inhabitants per square mile (648.9/km^{2}). There were 2,362 housing units at an average density of 724.5 per square mile (279.7/km^{2}). The racial makeup of the city was 97.0% White, 0.6% African American, 0.1% Native American, 0.4% Asian, 0.2% from other races, and 1.7% from two or more races. Hispanic or Latino of any race were 1.5% of the population.

There were 2,186 households, of which 32.3% had children under the age of 18 living with them, 52.4% were married couples living together, 12.1% had a female householder with no husband present, 3.5% had a male householder with no wife present, and 31.9% were non-families. 27.8% of all households were made up of individuals, and 12.9% had someone living alone who was 65 years of age or older. The average household size was 2.43 and the average family size was 2.95.

The median age in the city was 40.3 years. 23.1% of residents were under the age of 18; 8% were between the ages of 18 and 24; 25.4% were from 25 to 44; 25.9% were from 45 to 64; and 17.6% were 65 years of age or older. The gender makeup of the city was 47.2% male and 52.8% female.

=== 2000 census ===
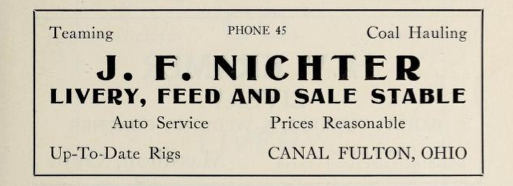
1915 ad for J.F. Nichter's livery stable

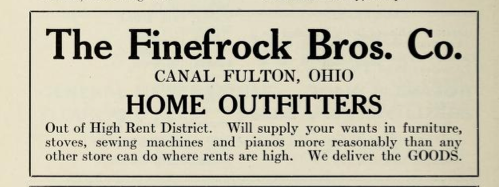
1915 advertisement for the Finefrock Bros Co, "Out Of High Rent District"

As of the census of 2000, there were 5,061 people, 1,823 households, and 1,349 families residing in the city. The population density was 2,090.8 inhabitants per square mile (807.3/km^{2}). There were 1,925 housing units at an average density of 795.3 per square mile (307.1/km^{2}). The racial makeup of the city was 97.27% White, 0.91% African American, 0.16% Native American, 0.41% Asian, 0.18% from other races, and 1.07% from two or more races. Hispanic or Latino of any race were 0.67% of the population.

There were 1,823 households, out of which 39.9% had children under the age of 18 living with them, 59.0% were married couples living together, 11.6% had a female householder with no husband present, and 26.0% were non-families. 22.1% of all households were made up of individuals, and 7.5% had someone living alone who was 65 years of age or older. The average household size was 2.65 and the average family size was 3.11.

In the city the population was spread out, with 27.6% under the age of 18, 8.4% from 18 to 24, 32.0% from 25 to 44, 20.7% from 45 to 64, and 11.3% who were 65 years of age or older. The median age was 34 years. For every 100 females, there were 88.7 males. For every 100 females age 18 and over, there were 84.5 males.

The median income for a household in the city was $45,359, and the median income for a family was $51,914. Males had a median income of $42,331 versus $23,540 for females. The per capita income for the city was $21,266. About 3.2% of families and 4.4% of the population were below the poverty line, including 4.8% of those under age 18 and none of those age 65 or over.
