= Roscoe Village (Coshocton, Ohio) =

- U.S. National Register of Historic Places
- U.S. Historic district
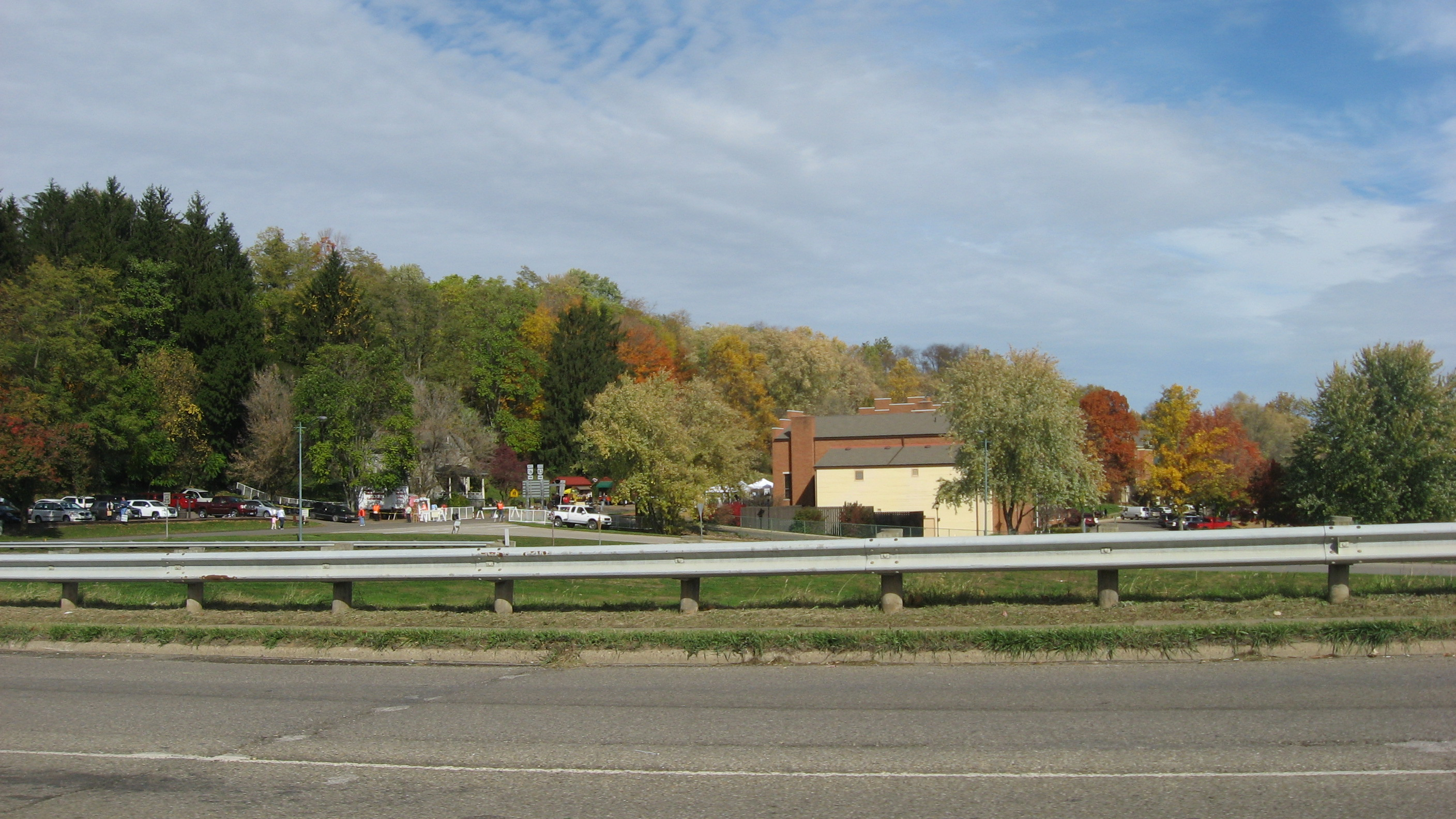
- Distant view from the south

- Location within Ohio Location within the United States
- Location: Whitewoman and High Sts., Coshocton, Ohio
- Coordinates: 40°16′35″N 81°52′36″W
- Built: 1816
- Architectural style: Classical Revival, Greek Revival
- NRHP reference No.: 73001403
- Added to NRHP: April 3, 1973

Roscoe Village is a restored Ohio and Erie Canal town located in Coshocton, Ohio, United States. Roscoe Village, was laid out in 1816. It was originally named Caldersburgh after its founder James Calder. After going bankrupt, the Coshocton merchant moved across the Muskingum River to some land he had managed to retain. Setting up a store and naming the place after himself, Calder reasoned that the rural farmers would much rather do business in Caldersburgh than pay the twenty-five cents for the ferry over to Coshocton. In 1830, two prominent citizens petitioned the state legislature to rename the village Roscoe in honor of William Roscoe, the famous English author and abolitionist of the time.

The transformation of Roscoe from a small, sleepy community into a thriving port along the Ohio and Erie Canal came with the arrival of the canal and the landing of the first canal boat, the Monticello, on August 21, 1830. The Ohio and Erie Canal, which provided cheap transportation for people and goods, granted great economic development for communities along the waterway. With its status as the fourth largest wheat port on the canal, Roscoe's prosperity ignited a chain of businesses in the area, including a blacksmith, a cooperage, a hotel, a mill, and several stores. State Route 16, which runs parallel to Roscoe today, is the location of the original Ohio and Erie Canal bed.

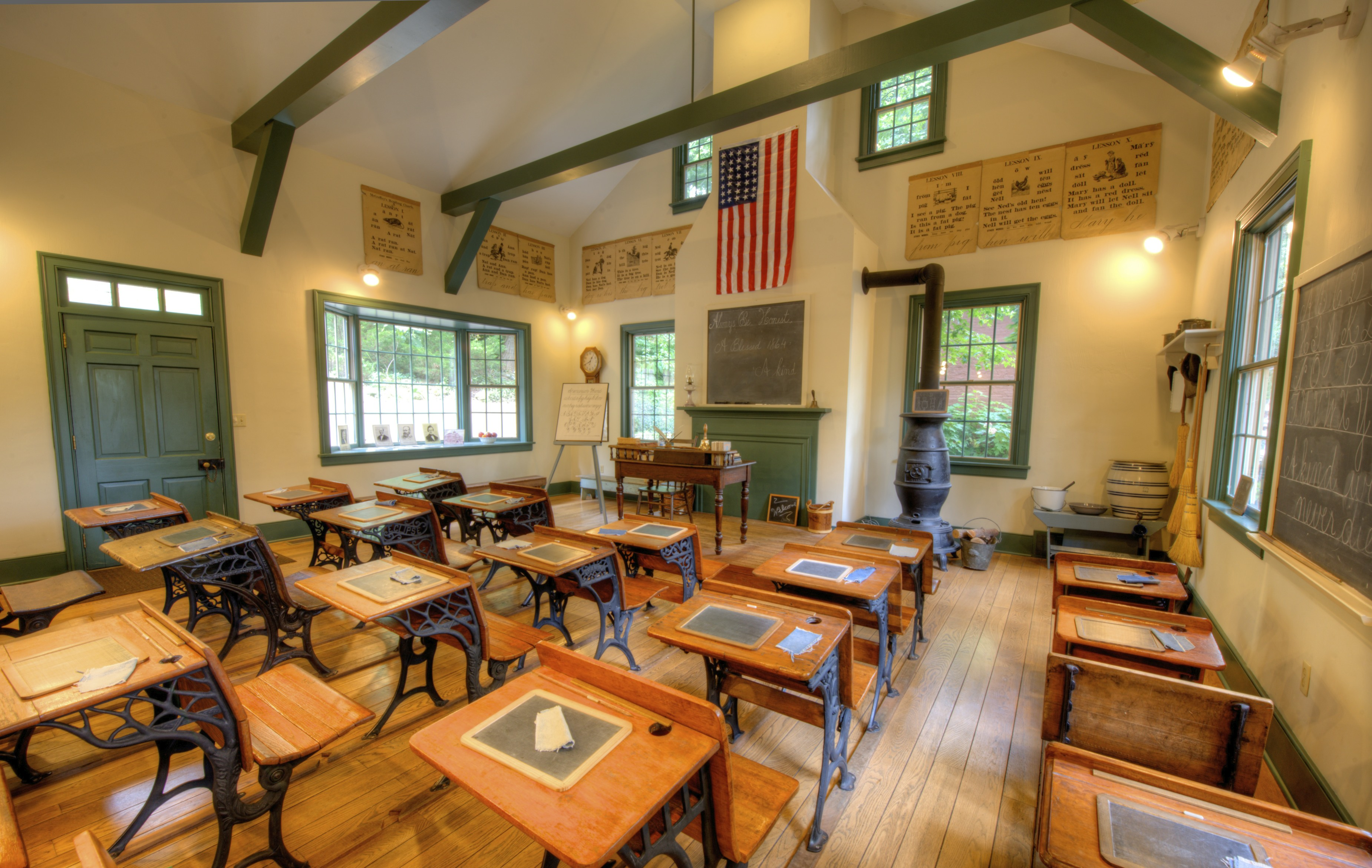
Interior of the schoolhouse

Until the great flood of 1913, the canals continued to operate, but the coming of the railroads marked the passing of the canal heyday. Along with the demise of the canal industry came the decline of Roscoe's prosperity, and the once thriving canal port and its beautiful Greek Revival buildings rapidly deteriorated.

In 1960, the idea of historical restoration in Roscoe came to prominence at the presentation of the Canal Days mural the distinguished American artist Dean Cornwell painted for Coshocton's 1961 Sesquicentennial Celebration. Cornwell chose a robust 1850s canal scene from Roscoe Village as the subject of his mural. This beautiful 24-foot-by-8-foot mural hangs today in Bank One of Coshocton while a smaller reproduction graces the lobby of the Roscoe Village Visitor Center.

Fascinated and inspired by the painting, retired Coshocton industrialist Edward E. Montgomery, and his wife, Frances, purchased the 1840 Toll House in August 1968, thus beginning the restoration of Historic Roscoe Village. Roscoe Village would be, as Mr. Montgomery stated, "a living museum so that people of the 20th century and succeeding ones could enjoy a visit back to the 19th century where aged brick buildings, hoop-skirted women, and quaint shops would bring the canal era back to life." Today, Roscoe Village is the result of more than 35 years of dedicated work.

The Foundation also purports to promote education with regard to life along the Ohio and Erie Canal in the mid 19th century. Living history is displayed and there are annual events which attract tourists from all over the country.

The Johnson-Humrickhouse Museum is located in the village, and features decorative arts, pioneer and Native American artifacts and local history displays.
