= Tuscarawas River =

River in Ohio, United States

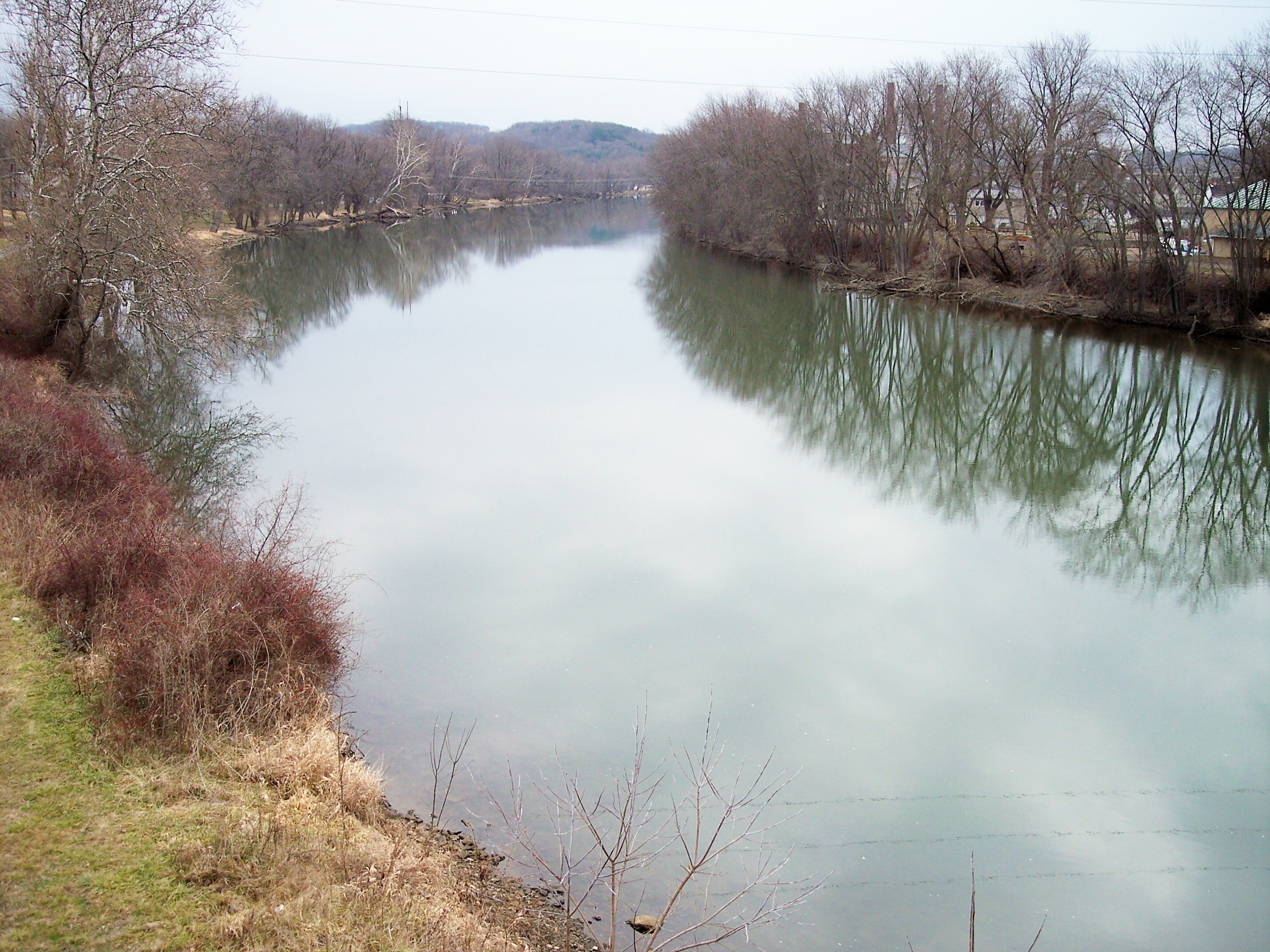
- The Tuscarawas River in Dover in 2006

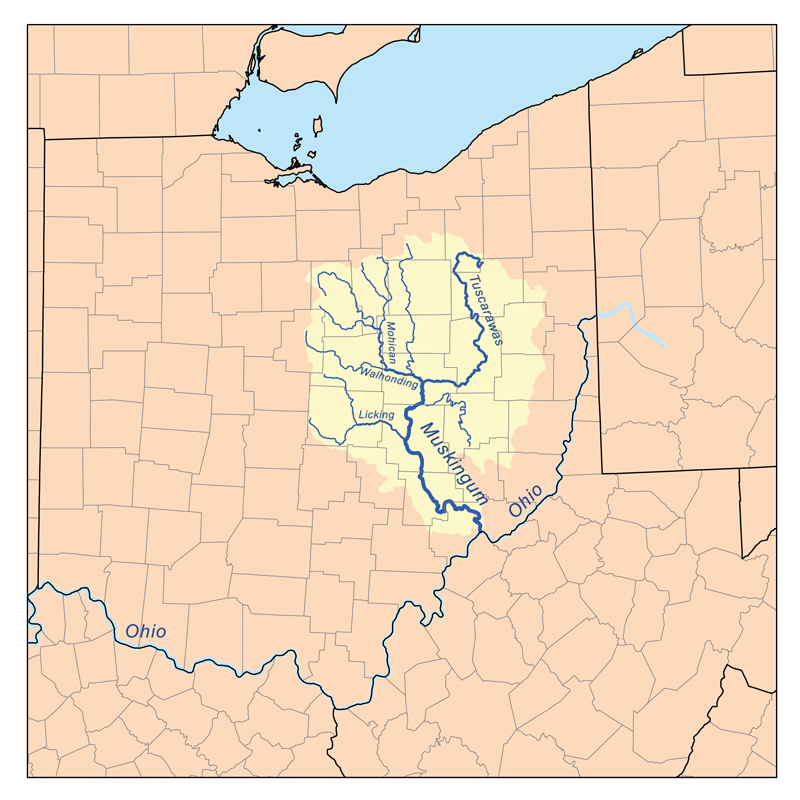
- Map of the Muskingum River watershed showing the Tuscarawas

Location
- Country: United States
- State: Ohio
- Counties: Stark, Summit, Tuscarawas, Coshocton

Physical characteristics
- Source
  - location: near Hartville
  - coordinates: 40°56′34″N 81°20′45″W
- Mouth: Muskingum River
  - location: Coshocton
  - coordinates: 40°16′31″N 81°52′24″W
  - elevation: 735 ft (224 m)
- Length: 129.9 mi (209.1 km)
- Basin size: 2,590 sq mi (6,700 km^{2})
- Discharge
  - location: Newcomerstown
  - average: 2,591 cu ft/s (73.4 m^{3}/s)
  - minimum: 216 cu ft/s (6.1 m^{3}/s)
  - maximum: 46,800 cu ft/s (1,330 m^{3}/s)
- Discharge
  - location: Massillon
  - average: 466 cu ft/s (13.2 m^{3}/s)

The Tuscarawas River (/ˌtʌskəˈrɑːwəs/ TUS-kə-RAH-wəs) is a principal tributary of the Muskingum River, 129.9 miles (209 km) long, in northeastern Ohio in the United States. Via the Muskingum and Ohio rivers, it is part of the watershed of the Mississippi River, draining an area of 2,590 square miles (6,700 km^{2}) on glaciated and unglaciated portions of the Allegheny Plateau.

== Route ==
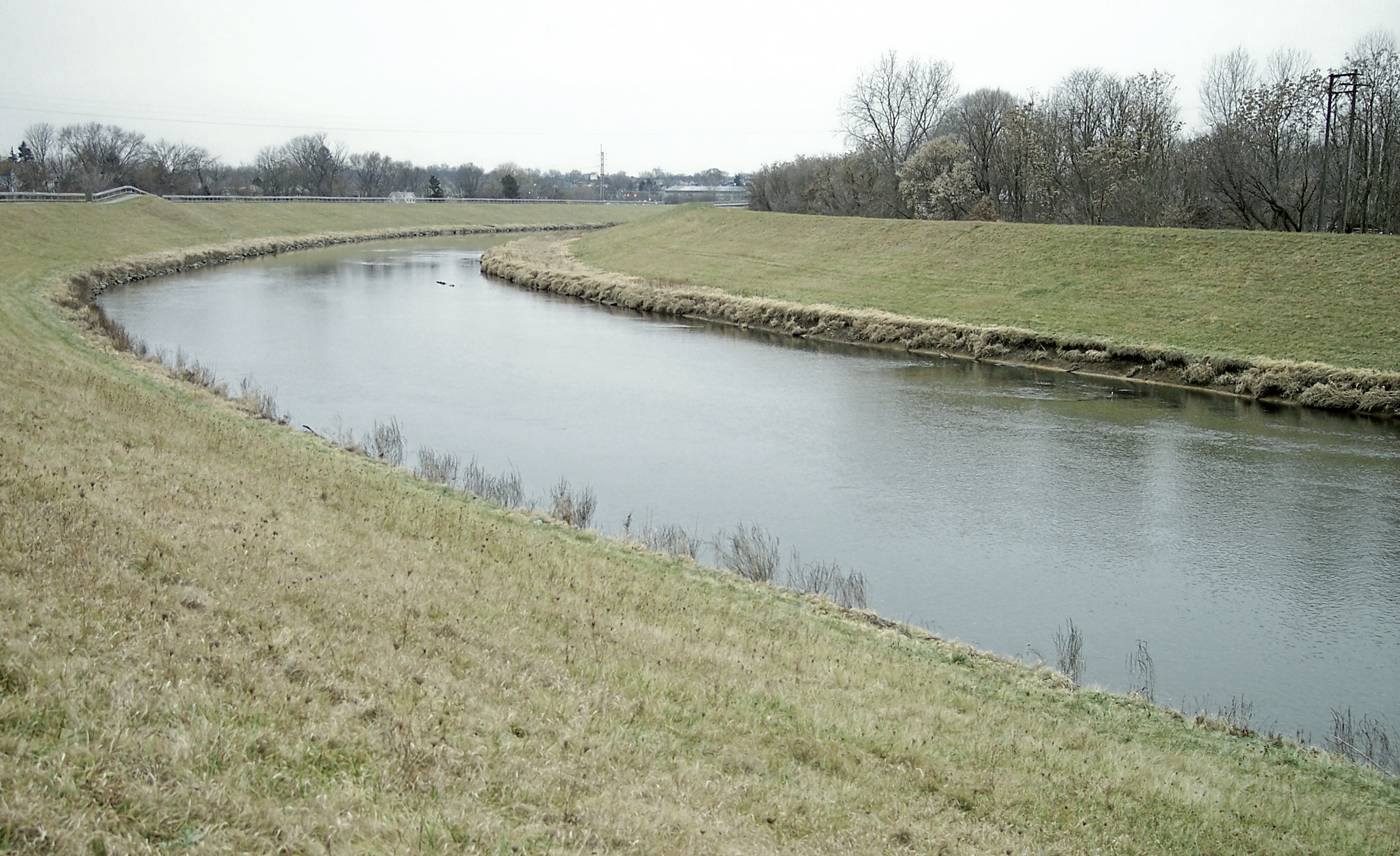
A channelized portion of the river in Massillon in 2006, as viewed from the towpath trail of the former Ohio and Erie Canal

The river rises southwest of Hartville in northern Stark County, and initially flows westward, through Uniontown into southern Summit County, where it passes through the Portage Lakes area south of Akron, and Barberton. From Barberton the Tuscarawas flows generally south through Stark and Tuscarawas counties; the communities of Clinton, Canal Fulton, Massillon, Navarre, Bolivar, Zoar, Dover, and New Philadelphia were developed along its banks. South of New Philadelphia, the river turns southwest and west, flowing past Tuscarawas, Gnadenhutten, Port Washington, and Newcomerstown, sites of former Lenape people villages at the time of the American Revolutionary War, into Coshocton County, where it joins the Walhonding River at the city of Coshocton (a former major Lenape site) to form the Muskingum River.

From Barberton downstream, the Ohio and Erie Canal was constructed parallel to the river in 1828–30 to provide for improved transportation of products and passengers. Usage began declining in the 1850s, and the canal was damaged beyond repair by flooding in 1913. Portions of the canal's towpath route are maintained as a hiking and bicycling trail.

According to the Geographic Names Information System, the Tuscarawas River has also been known historically by the names Little Muskingum River (or, "East branch of the Muskingum"), Mashongam River, Tuscarawa River, and Tuskarawas Creek, all derived from Native American terms.

As of 2006, the state of Ohio Environmental Protection Agency has recommended limits on the consumption of fish taken from the river, due to contamination by mercury and PCBs.

== Tributaries ==
The Tuscarawas River collects Chippewa Creek in Summit County near Clinton, and Wolf Creek in Norton, and Sandy Creek in Stark County near Bolivar. In Tuscarawas County, it collects Conotton Creek southeast of Zoar; Sugar Creek at Dover; and Stillwater Creek north of Tuscarawas. Nimishillen Creek, a tributary of Sandy Creek, drains the city of Canton.

== Flow rate ==
At the United States Geological Survey's stream gauge in Newcomerstown, the annual mean flow of the river between 1922 and 2005 was 2,591 ft³/s (73 m³/s). The highest recorded flow during the period was 46,800 ft³/s (1,325 m³/s) on January 26, 1937. The lowest recorded flow was 216 ft³/s (6 m³/s) on August 15, 1944.

At an upstream gauge in Massillon, the annual mean flow of the river between 1938 and 2005 was 466 ft³/s (13 m³/s). The highest recorded flow during the period was 10,700 ft³/s (303 m³/s) on July 5, 1969. The lowest recorded flow was 45 ft³/s (1.3 m³/s) on September 20, 1999.

== In popular culture ==
- Conrad Richter's novel, The Light in the Forest (1953), features True Son recalling a memory set along the Tuscarawas River.
- The band Sun Kil Moon refers to the Tuscarawas in their song "Carry Me, Ohio", with the lyric, "Tuscarawas flows into the prairie land".

== See also ==
- List of rivers of Ohio
