= Tinkers Creek Aqueduct =

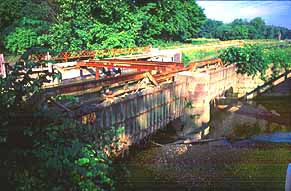
- Coordinates: 41°21′53.5″N 81°36′31.7″W; Elevation: 610 feet (190 m)
- Carries: Ohio and Erie Canal
- Crosses: Tinkers Creek (Cuyahoga River)
- Locale: Canal Road and Tinkers Creek Road, Valley View, Cuyahoga County, Ohio
- Maintained by: National Park Service, Cuyahoga Valley National Park

Characteristics
- Material: Wood deck and sides, steel trusses over Ashlar-sandstone piers
- Total length: Overall (including approaches): 90 feet (27 m); Each span: about 40 feet (12 m)
- Width: Interior: 22 feet (6.7 m)
- No. of spans: 2
- Piers in water: 1
- Load limit: 16,500 pounds (7,500 kg) per running 1 foot (0.30 m)
- Clearance above: Unlimited
- Clearance below: 0 feet (0 m)

History
- Designer
- Construction start: 1826
- Construction end: 1827; Re-built: 1845 and 1905
- Opened: 1827 until 1913 flood subsequent disuse 2007-? reconstruction project
- Tinkers Creek Aqueduct
- U.S. National Register of Historic Places
- U.S. National Historic Landmark District – Contributing property
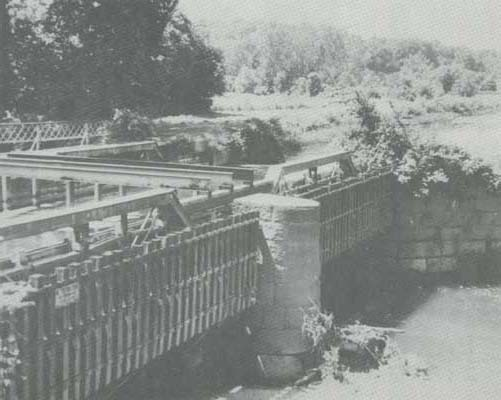
- Tinkers Creek Aqueduct
- Location: Valley View, Cuyahoga County, Ohio
- Area: less than one acre
- Built: 1825-1827; rebuilt 1845 and 1905
- Part of: Ohio and Erie Canal (ID66000607)
- MPS: Ohio and Erie Canal TR
- NRHP reference No.: 79000296

Significant dates
- Added to NRHP: December 11, 1979
- Designated NHLDCP: November 13, 1966

Location
- Interactive map of Tinkers Creek Aqueduct

Tinkers Creek Aqueduct is an aqueduct that was constructed to bridge the Ohio and Erie Canal over Tinkers Creek near its confluence with the Cuyahoga River in Valley View, Ohio. It is a relatively rare surviving example of an Ohio and Erie Canal aqueduct. It was originally constructed in 1825-1827 by, and re-built due to flood damage in 1845 and 1905. Tinkers Creek Aqueduct was included in a National Historic Landmark district established in 1966, and it was separately listed on the National Register of Historic Places in 1979. The original Tinkers Creek Aqueduct was a wood plank, steel truss, and Ashlar-sandstone structure constructed in 1827, south of the present aqueduct's location. Cuyahoga River and Tinkers Creek flooding caused continual damage to the original aqueduct, so successive structures were built in 1845 and 1905 in the present location. Today, Tinkers Creek Aqueduct is the only aqueduct which remains of the four original aqueducts in the Cuyahoga Valley. Of Furnace Run Aqueduct, Mill Creek Aqueduct, Peninsula Aqueduct, and (? Yellow Creek ?) Aqueduct; Mill Creek Aqueduct, of newer construction, is the only aqueduct which still carries Ohio and Erie Canal water. After 102 years of flooding, weathering, and deterioration, Tinkers Creek Aqueduct was removed in 2007. The National Park Service is currently working on Phase II of the project to reconstruct it from newer materials.

== Statistics ==
- Ohio and Erie Canal
- Valley View Village, County of Cuyahoga, Ohio
- Ohio 631
- Elevation: 610 feet (185.9 m)
- National Register Number: 66000607
- Resource type: District.
- Property type: Transportation - water -related.
- The threat level was Threatened in 2006.
- Congressional District: OH-11
- Certified Local Government: NO
- This NHL offers public access.
- Current use/information: Part of Cuyahoga Valley National Park.

== Condition ==
The Tinkers Creek Aqueduct is a contributing structure on the NHL portion of the canal and continues to deteriorate rapidly. Due to the advanced state of decay, the aqueduct structure and the associated towpath Trial bridge will be removed and eventually replace with a newer aqueduct and bridge. Phase 1 of the project will involve removal of the existing aqueduct and Towpath Bridge, installation of a new Towpath Bridge, installation of temporary steel pipes to carry the canal water over the creek, restoration of portions of the sandstone abutment walls, and installation of a temporary high-water overflow structure. A later phase will include replacement of the aqueduct structure with a new design and restoration of the existing sandstone center pier and remaining abutment walls. Phase 1 is to begin in FY 2007. The increased numbers of flood events in recent years has caused significant damage to the river and stream banks which potentially threatens the canal basin. Ongoing monitoring and stabilization of river and stream banks will continue as needed.

== Flooding ==
The aqueduct and surrounding area are subject to flooding by the Cuyahoga River and Tinkers Creek.

== See also ==
- Nine Mile Creek Aqueduct, restored aqueduct on the Erie Canal, in Camillus, New York
- List of bridges documented by the Historic American Engineering Record in Ohio
- List of bridges on the National Register of Historic Places in Ohio
- List of Registered Historic Places in Cuyahoga County, Ohio
