= Zoar, Ohio =

- Village
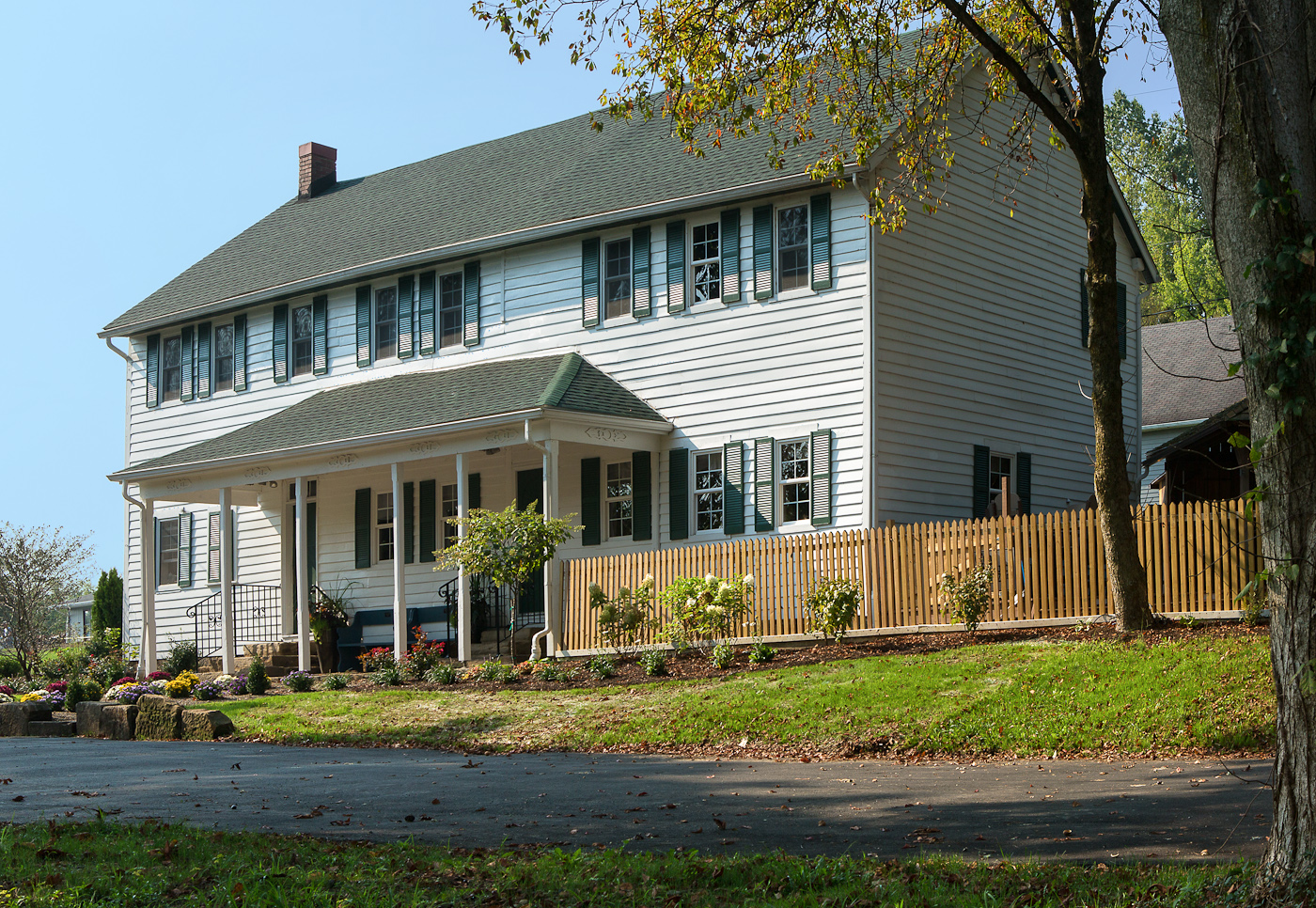
- Former canal tavern

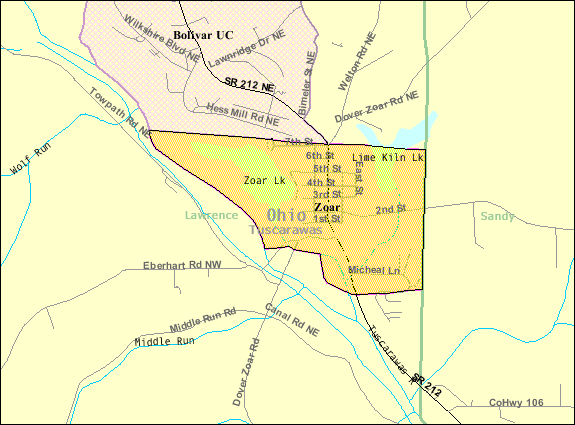
- Detailed map of Zoar

- Location within Ohio Location within the United States
- Coordinates: 40°36′48″N 81°25′24″W
- Country: United States
- State: Ohio
- County: Tuscarawas
- Township: Lawrence

Area
  - Total: 0.66 sq mi (1.72 km^{2})
  - Land: 0.58 sq mi (1.49 km^{2})
  - Water: 0.089 sq mi (0.23 km^{2})
- Elevation: 896 ft (273 m)

Population (2020)
  - Total: 172
  - Density: 298.8/sq mi (115.36/km^{2})
- Time zone: UTC-5 (Eastern (EST))
  - Summer (DST): UTC-4 (EDT)
- ZIP code: 44697
- Area code: 330
- FIPS code: 39-88168
- GNIS feature ID: 2399758
- Website: https://www.zoarohio.net/

Zoar (/ˈzɔːr/ ZOR) is a village in Tuscarawas County, Ohio, United States. The population was 172 at the 2020 census. The community was founded in 1817 by Radical Pietists as a utopian Christian community, which survived until 1898.

Much of the village's early layout survives, as do many buildings from its utopian origins. Most of the community was listed on the National Register of Historic Places in 1969 as the Zoar Historic District, and it was designated a National Historic Landmark District in 2016. Some of the historic buildings are now owned and operated as museum properties by Ohio History Connection.

== History ==
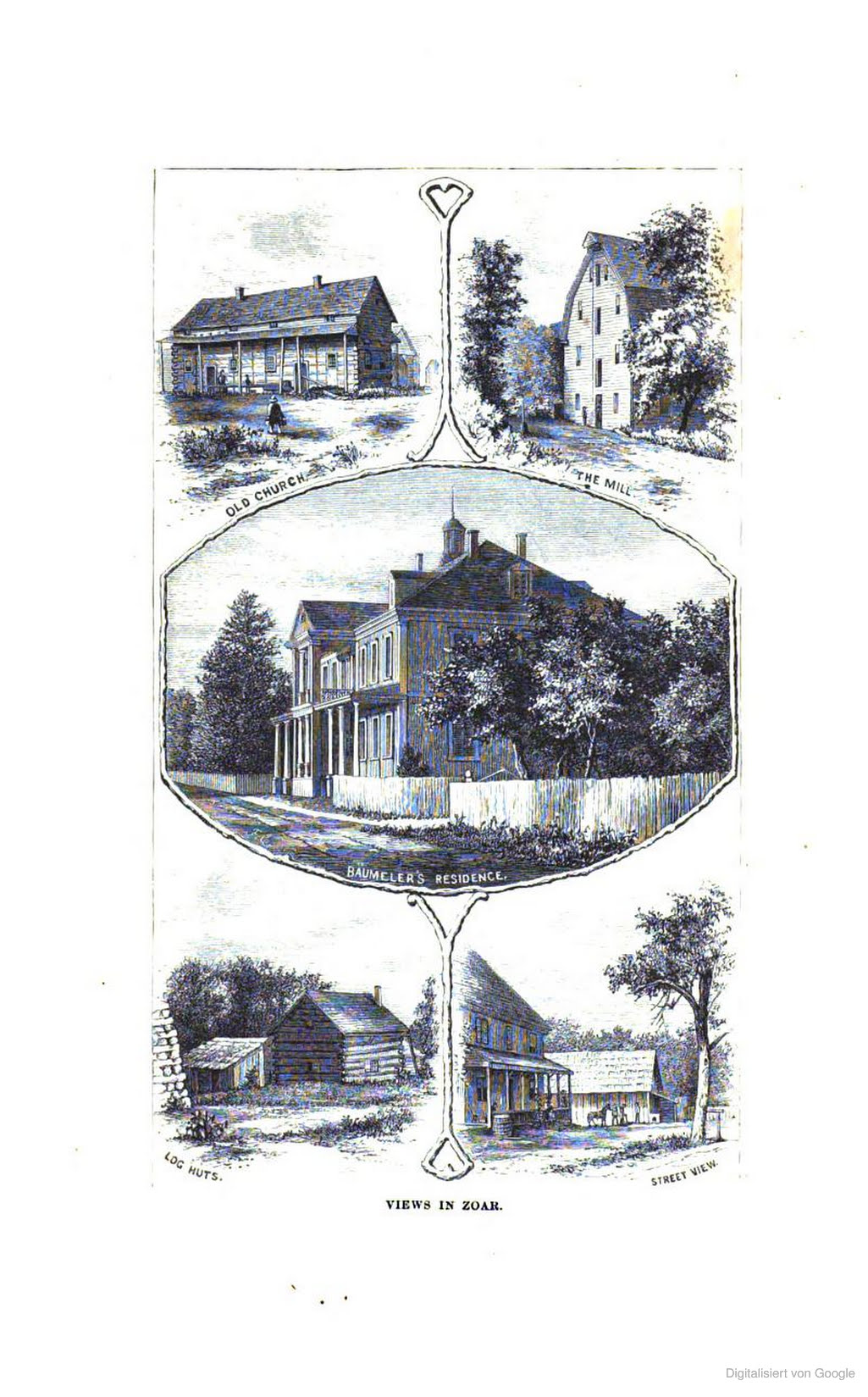
Views in Zoar, 1875

Zoar was founded by Radical Pietist Christian dissenters from Germany called the Society of Separatists of Zoar in 1817. It was named after the Biblical village to which Lot and his family escaped from Sodom. It was a communal society: All property was communally owned, and the farms, shops, and factories were managed by regularly elected trustees. The society attained its greatest prosperity in the 1850s, when it owned over 10,000 acres of land and was worth approximately $1 million. Many German-style structures have been restored and are part of the Zoar Village State Memorial. There are presently ten restored buildings. According to the Ohio Historical Connection, Zoar is an island of Old-World charm in east-central Ohio.

These Radical Pietists, also known as Separatists, or Zoarites, emigrated from the kingdom of Württemberg in southwestern Germany due to religious oppression from the Lutheran church. Leading among their group were some natives of Rottenacker on the Danube. Having separated from the established church, they based their theology in part on the writings of Jakob Böhme. They did not practice baptism or confirmation and did not celebrate religious holidays except for the Sabbath. A central flower garden in Zoar is based on the Book of Revelation, with a towering tree (now cut down) in the middle representing Christ and other elements surrounding it representing other allegorical elements.

The leader of the society was named Joseph Bimeler (also known as Joseph Bäumler or Bäumeler, born 1778), a pipemaker as well as teacher from Ulm. His charismatic leadership carried the village through a number of crises. Bimeler led the society until his death, which occurred in 1853.

An early event critical to the success of the colony was the digging of the Ohio and Erie Canal. The Zoarites had purchased 5,500 acres (22 km^{2}) of land sight unseen and used loans to pay for it. The loans were to be paid off by 1830. The Society struggled for many years to determine what products and services they could produce in their village to pay off the loans. The state of Ohio required some of the Zoarite land to be used as a right of way and offered the Zoarites an opportunity to assist in digging the canals for money. The state gave them a choice of digging it themselves for pay or having the state pay others to dig the canal. The Zoarites then spent several years in the 1820s digging the canal and thus were able to pay off their loans on time with much money to spare.

Bimeler's death on August 31, 1853, led to a slow decline in the cohesion of the village. By 1898, the village voted to disband the communal society, and the property was divided among the remaining residents.

== Geography ==
Zoar is located at 40°36′47″N 81°25′18″W (40.613102, -81.421686), along the Tuscarawas River. That is 2.9 road miles east of I77 via Ohio route 212 and 16.1 road miles south of Canton, Ohio in Stark County. (Canton itself is 24 miles south of Akron and 58 miles south of Cleveland and Lake Erie.)

Zoar village is 3.2 road miles north of Zoarville, Ohio, an unincorporated community.

According to the United States Census Bureau, the village has a total area of 0.67 square miles (1.74 km^{2}), of which 0.58 square miles (1.50 km^{2}) is land and 0.09 square miles (0.23 km^{2}) is water.

Zoar is located at Mile Post 84.5 on the main line of the Wheeling and Lake Erie Railway between Cleveland and Wheeling, West Virginia, which parallels the Tuscarawas River for much of its length.

== Demographics ==
Historical population
Census	Pop.	Note	%±
1850	249		—
1860	252		1.2%
1870	326		29.4%
1880	291		−10.7%
1900	290		—
1910	182		−37.2%
1920	178		−2.2%
1930	146		−18.0%
1940	208		42.5%
1950	200		−3.8%
1960	191		−4.5%
1970	228		19.4%
1980	264		15.8%
1990	177		−33.0%
2000	193		9.0%
2010	169		−12.4%
2020	172		1.8%
U.S. Decennial Census

=== 2010 census ===
As of the census of 2010, there were 169 people, 77 households, and 58 families residing in the village. The population density was 291.4 inhabitants per square mile (112.5/km^{2}). There were 85 housing units at an average density of 146.6 per square mile (56.6/km^{2}). The racial makeup of the village was 98.2% White, 0.6% Asian, and 1.2% from two or more races. Hispanic or Latino of any race were 0.6% of the population.

There were 77 households, of which 19.5% had children under the age of 18 living with them, 66.2% were married couples living together, 7.8% had a female householder with no husband present, 1.3% had a male householder with no wife present, and 24.7% were non-families. 20.8% of all households were made up of individuals, and 2.6% had someone living alone who was 65 years of age or older. The average household size was 2.19 and the average family size was 2.50.

The median age in the village was 52.6 years. 10.1% of residents were under the age of 18; 6.5% were between the ages of 18 and 24; 14.8% were from 25 to 44; 42.6% were from 45 to 64; and 26% were 65 years of age or older. The gender makeup of the village was 52.1% male and 47.9% female.

=== 2000 census ===
As of the census of 2000, there were 193 people, 79 households, and 62 families residing in the village. The population density was 350.8 inhabitants per square mile (135.4/km^{2}). There were 81 housing units at an average density of 147.2 per square mile (56.8/km^{2}). The racial makeup of the village was 97.93% White, 1.04% Asian, and 1.04% from two or more races. Hispanic or Latino of any race were 0.52% of the population.

There were 79 households, out of which 22.8% had children under the age of 18 living with them, 68.4% were married couples living together, 10.1% had a female householder with no husband present, and 20.3% were non-families. 17.7% of all households were made up of individuals, and 10.1% had someone living alone who was 65 years of age or older. The average household size was 2.44 and the average family size was 2.73.

In the village, the population was spread out, with 20.2% under the age of 18, 5.7% from 18 to 24, 18.7% from 25 to 44, 42.5% from 45 to 64, and 13.0% who were 65 years of age or older. The median age was 48 years. For every 100 females there were 89.2 males. For every 100 females age 18 and over, there were 87.8 males.

The median income for a household in the village was $46,964, and the median income for a family was $55,625. Males had a median income of $45,417 versus $33,750 for females. The per capita income for the village was $22,828. About 3.6% of families and 3.6% of the population were below the poverty line, including 5.4% of those under the age of 18 and none of those 65 and older.

== Flooding threat ==
The future of the village is threatened because a Tuscarawas River levee that protects the village has been given the lowest safety rating by the U.S. Army Corps of Engineers. The village sits at the base of the levee, which was built by the Corps in 1936 as part of its water management program in the region.

With the levee in failing condition, the Corps was evaluating three alternatives:

- Repair the levee
- Purchase the village, tear it down, and let the area flood
- Relocate the village to higher ground.

The Zoar Village Government and the Zoar Community Association are working to preserve the village where it stands and have created the Save Historic Zoar Association.

Initial Corps estimates, as of mid-2012, put the cost of repairing the levee at about $130 million, slightly less than $1 million per resident. In June 2012 the National Trust for Historic Preservation placed Zoar on its annual list of "America's eleven most endangered historic places."

In November 2013 the Corps, following further review, reclassified the levee's safety rating from 1 (lowest) to Dam Safety Action Classification 3, meaning the possibility of failure is moderate to high. An expedited full evaluation was to occur within a year. In so doing, the Corps also dropped the option of breaching the levee from the list of solutions being considered, and studied options for repairing the existing levee, thereby significantly reducing the likelihood that the village would have to be destroyed or relocated.

In 2023, the Army Corps of Engineers completed a $14 million project to repair the levee and save Zoar Village.

== Financing and economics ==
After arriving from Germany, the Separatists needed help due to the cost of their emigration and settling in Ohio. Quakers in both Great Britain and Pennsylvania aided them. The Quakers had much in common with them: they had similar ideas of pacifism and practice of the Christian religion. In 1817, the settlers bought roughly 5,500 acres of land from Godfrey Haga. The Quakers loaned them money to support part of the purchase. Joseph Bimeler vowed to pay off the remaining balance of $15,000 within 15 years. The following years of the society was not met with economic prosperity. In the early years of the village, community leaders required celibacy among their residents, as the additional cost of bearing many children in a communal society was too large. In the 1830s, the Ohio and Erie Canal was constructed. To accumulate money from the state, Zoarites constructed part of the Canal on their own, and received $21,000 from the state. During this period, blacksmithing and tin shops flourished in the village, as well as flour and wool mills. In 1853, after Joseph Bimeler's passing, the village was worth around $5 million. Preceding Joseph Bimeler's death, the village peaked. After 1853, the village began its decline. At its dissolution in 1898, there were 222 members of the community, with an estimated collective worth of $3.5 million.

== Buildings ==
As construction of the village began, the buildings were subsequently numbered in the order that they were built. Many of the original buildings are still completely original.

=== Number One House ===
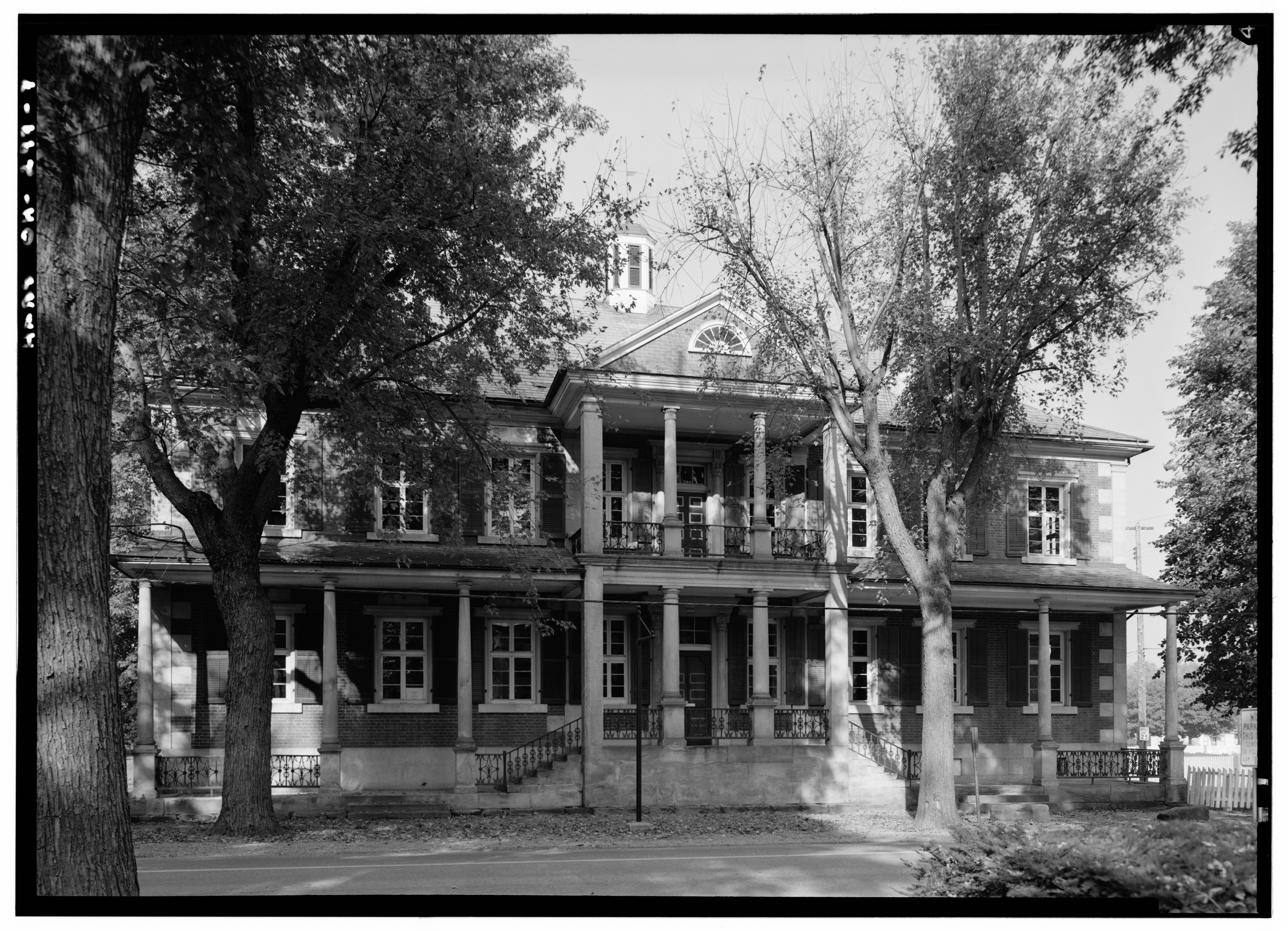
King's Palace

Originally built in 1835 to house the elders of the village, Joseph Bimeler and his family made this building their home.

=== Town Hall ===
The town hall for the Society was built in 1887. Since the Society disbanded in 1898, this building was actually one of the last ones to be constructed. Restoration of town hall took place in 2002 with help from private funds. The lower level is used as a governmental chamber and the two upper floors house artifacts that were commonly used throughout the village.

=== The Zoar Hotel ===
Built in 1833, the hotel is said to have been a home for anyone- rich or poor. President William McKinley had a favorite room here. He is said to have enjoyed the German cuisine and he favored staying here. It is currently only open on special occasions, unlike most other museum buildings. Renovations have been made on the outside of the hotel, but the inside is worn down and unsafe for regular use. The preservation committee, Zoar Community Association, is currently waiting on funding for inside renovation.

== See also ==
- Old Economy Village another Christian theosophist founded village
