= Ohio & Erie Canalway National Heritage Area =

United States National Heritage Area in Ohio

The Ohio and Erie Canalway National Heritage Area is a federally designated National Heritage Area in northeastern Ohio that incorporates the routes of the Ohio and Erie Canal, the Cuyahoga Valley Scenic Railroad, and portions of Cuyahoga Valley National Park.The heritage area follows the path of the canal along the Cuyahoga River for 110 miles (180 km) from Cleveland through Akron and Massillon to New Philadelphia, while the railway runs from Cleveland to Akron to Canton.

The Ohio & Erie Canalway National Heritage Area was established in 1996. It is managed by the Ohio & Erie Canalway Association.
