= Tinkers Creek State Park =

Park in Ohio, USA

- Tinkers Creek Area
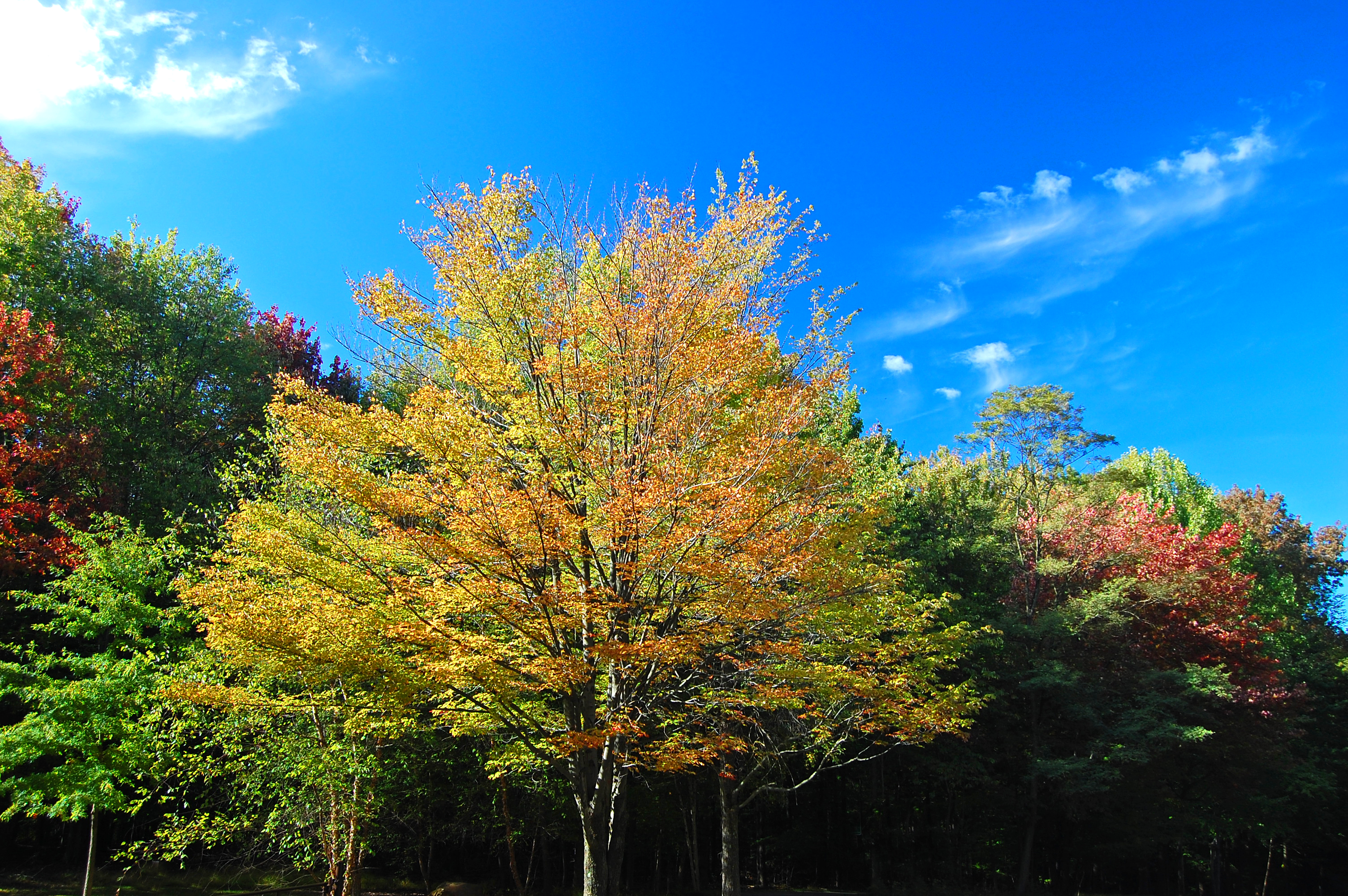
- Trees in autumn at Tinkers Creek, October 2008

- Location within Ohio Location within the United States
- Location: Portage County, Ohio, USA
- Nearest city: Streetsboro, Ohio
- Coordinates: 41°16′25″N 81°22′32″W
- Area: 355 acres (144 ha)
- Elevation: 1,007 feet (307 m)
- Established: 1973
- Administrator: Summit Metro Parks
- Website: Tinkers Creek State Park

Tinkers Creek State Park is a public recreation area that under the name Tinkers Creek Area is part of Liberty Park in Streetsboro, Portage County, Ohio, United States. The area's small lakes and marshes provide food and habitat for beavers and thousands of waterfowl. The park offers archery, spring-fed fishing lake, hiking trails, and picnicking areas.

== History ==
Before the state park opened, a private park called Colonial Spring Gardens existed on the land. The State of Ohio acquired the land in 1966 and officially opened the state park in 1973. In 2014, Summit Metro Parks signed an agreement with the Ohio Department of Natural Resources to manage Tinkers Creek State Park and the adjacent Tinkers Creek State Nature Preserve for a period of 25 years.
