= Ohio and Erie Canal =

19th-century manmade water route between Akron and Cleveland, Ohio, USA

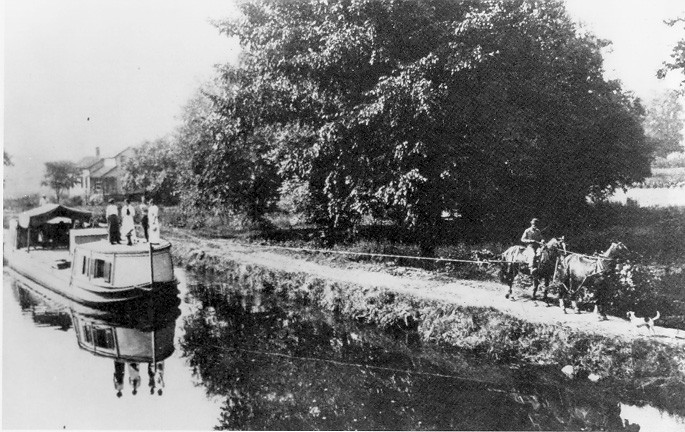
- A portion of the Ohio and Erie canal in 1902
- Location: Independence and Valley View, Cuyahoga County, Ohio

Specifications
- Length: 308 miles (496 km)
- Locks: 152 (originally 146)
- Status: closed

Geography
- Start point: Cleveland, Ohio on the Lake Erie
- End point: Portsmouth, Ohio, U.S.
- Ohio and Erie Canal Historic District
- U.S. National Register of Historic Places
- U.S. National Historic Landmark District
- Location: Independence and Valley View, Cuyahoga County, Ohio
- Area: 24.5 acres (99,000 m^{2})
- Built: 1825
- NRHP reference No.: 66000607

Significant dates
- Added to NRHP: November 13, 1966
- Designated NHLD: November 13, 1966

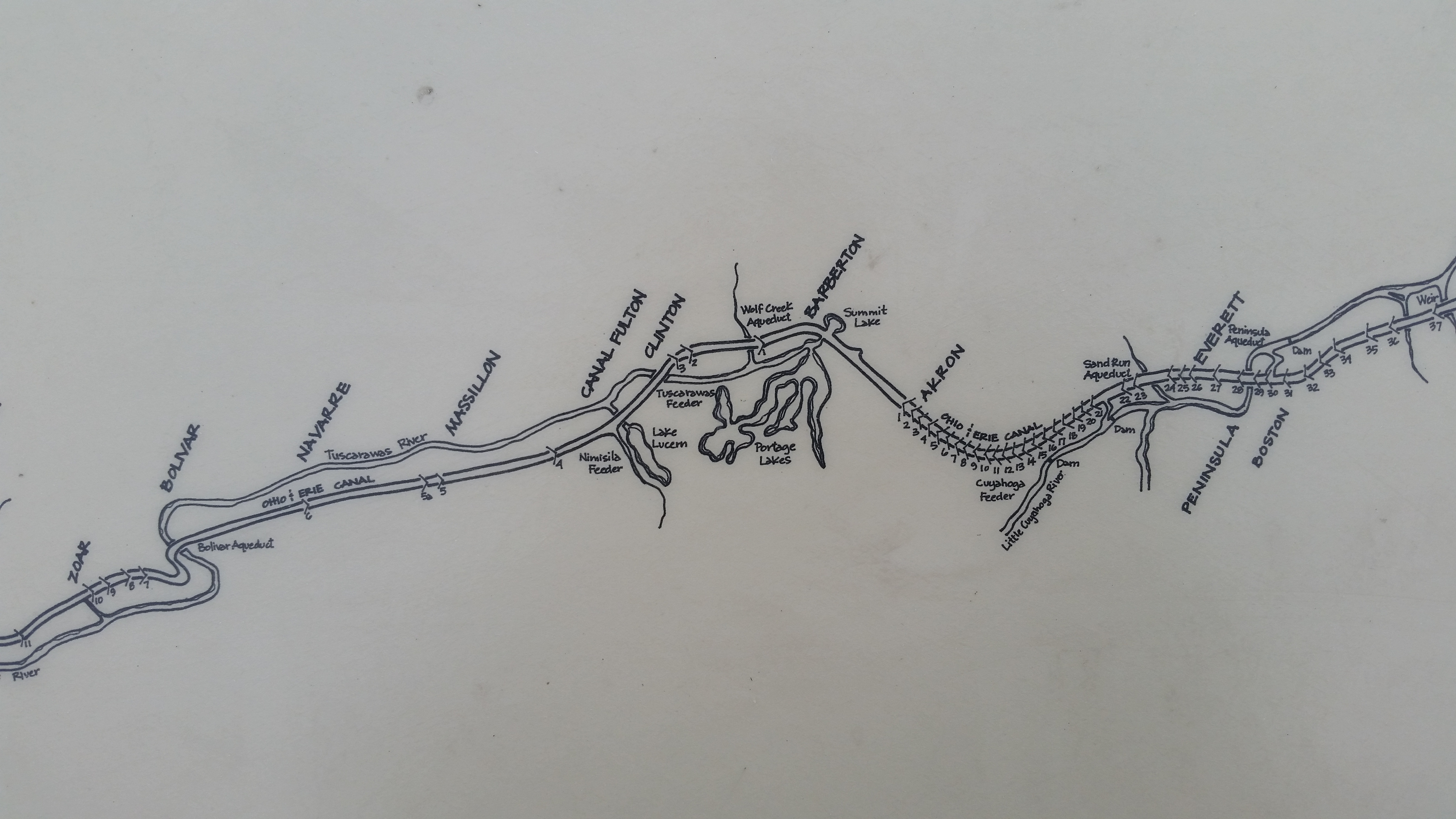
Map of a portion of the canal route in the Cuyahoga Valley

The Ohio and Erie Canal was a canal constructed during the 1820s and early 1830s in Ohio. It connected Akron with the Cuyahoga River near its outlet on Lake Erie in Cleveland, and a few years later, with the Ohio River near Portsmouth. It also had connections to other canal systems in Pennsylvania.

The canal carried freight traffic from 1827 to 1861, when the construction of railroads ended demand. From 1862 to 1913, the canal served as a water source for industries and towns. During 1913, much of the canal system was abandoned after important parts were flooded severely.

Most of the surviving portions in the Akron-Cleveland area are managed by the National Park Service or Ohio Department of Natural Resources. They are used for various recreational purposes by the public, and still provide water for some industries. Parts of the canal are preserved, including the Ohio and Erie Canal Historic District, a National Historic Landmark. Portions further south are less well preserved, and a discontiguous set of locks and other canal resources roughly between Columbus and the Ohio River are listed on the National Register as the Ohio and Erie Canal Southern Descent Historic District.

== History ==
Ohio, which achieved statehood in 1803, remained a sparsely populated region of 50,000 people who were scattered throughout the state and who had no means of transporting goods economically out of the state. Without easy access to distant markets, agriculture served only local needs and large-scale manufacturing was nearly non-existent.

=== Agitation for a canal system (1787–1822) ===
As early as 1787, George Washington and Thomas Jefferson had discussed the desirability of a canal linking Lake Erie to the Ohio River as part of a national system of canals. It wasn't until 1807 that Ohio's first Senator, Thomas Worthington, offered a resolution in Congress asking Treasury Secretary Albert Gallatin to report to the Senate. In 1810, DeWitt Clinton was appointed to manage the Erie Canal Commission. He was unsuccessful in his attempt to get national aid for the construction of a canal connecting Lake Erie to the Hudson River, so he enlisted the aid of state legislators and Ohio's congressional delegation. On January 15, 1812, the Ohio General Assembly passed a resolution expressing its opinion that the connection of the Great Lakes with the Hudson River was a project of "national concern". President Madison was against the proposal, however, and the War of 1812 ended official discussion.

On December 11, 1816, Clinton, by then the Governor of New York, sent a letter to the Ohio Legislature indicating his state's willingness to construct the Erie Canal without national help, and asking the State of Ohio to join the endeavor. On January 9, 1817, the Ohio Legislature directed Ohio's Governor (and former Senator) Thomas Worthington to negotiate a deal with Clinton. Due to the cost, however, the Ohio Legislature dallied, and nothing happened for three years. Finally, in January 1822, the Ohio Legislature passed acts to fund the canal system (and the state's public education obligations).

=== Survey and design (1822) ===
On January 31, 1822, the Ohio General Assembly passed a resolution to employ an engineer and appoint commissioners to survey and design the canal system as soon as possible. A sum not to exceed $6,000 was reserved for this purpose.

James Geddes, an engineer who had worked on the New York canals, was hired. Since most of Ohio's population lived along a line from Cleveland to Cincinnati, the main trunk of the canal needed to serve these areas. But no single river followed this line — canals are more cheaply and easily built along river valleys — making it difficult to design a suitable system. Specifically, the bridging of the Scioto and Miami river valleys required raising the canal to such an elevation that water from neither river could be used as a source. As a result, the canal was divided into two sections: the Ohio and Erie Canal, which connected Cleveland to Portsmouth via the Licking Divide and the Scioto River Valley, and the Miami and Erie Canal, which connected Cincinnati to Dayton. This second canal would ultimately be extended to the Maumee River at Toledo.

Copies of the original survey plat maps for the construction of both Ohio canals are available on-line from the Ohio Department of Natural Resources.

=== Construction (1825–1832) ===
On February 4, 1825, the Ohio Legislature passed "An Act to provide for the Internal Improvement of the State of Ohio by Navigable Canals". The Canal Commission was authorized to borrow $400,000 in 1825, and not more than $600,000 per year thereafter. The notes issued were to be redeemable between 1850 and 1875.

On July 4, 1825, ground was broken for the canal at Licking Summit near Newark, Ohio.

The canals were specified to have a minimum width of 40 feet (12 m) at the top, 26 feet (8 m) at the bottom, and a depth of 4 feet (1.2 m) feet minimum. These limits were often exceeded, and indeed it was cheaper to do so in most cases. For example, it might be cheaper to build one embankment and then let the water fill all the way to a hillside parallel, perhaps hundreds of feet away, rather than build two embankments. By damming the rivers, long stretches of slackwater could be created which, with the addition of towpaths, could serve as portions of the canal. Where it made economic sense to do so, such as lock widths or portions of the canal through narrow rock or across aqueducts, the minimum widths were adhered to.

Contracts were let for the following tasks: Grubbing and clearing, Mucking and ditching, Embankment and excavation, Locks and culverts, Puddling, and Protection.

Initially, contractors in general proved to be inexperienced and unreliable. It was common for one job to receive 50 bids, many of them local to where the work was being performed. The chosen contractor, having underbid the contract, often would abscond leaving his labor force unpaid and his contract unfulfilled. This problem was so bad that many laborers refused to perform canal work for fear of not being paid. As the bidding process was improved, and more reliable contractors engaged, the situation improved.

Workers were initially paid $0.30 per day and offered a jigger of whiskey. As work progressed, and where labor was in shortage, workers could make as much as $15 per month. At that time, cash money was scarce in Ohio forcing much bartering. Working on the canal was appealing and attracted many farmers from their land.

On July 3, 1827, the first canal boat on the Ohio and Erie Canal left Akron, traveled through 41 locks and over 3 aqueducts along 37 miles (60 km) of canal, to arrive at Cleveland on July 4. While the average speed of 3 mph (5 km/h) may seem slow, canal boats could carry 10 tons of goods and were much more efficient than wagons over rutted trails.

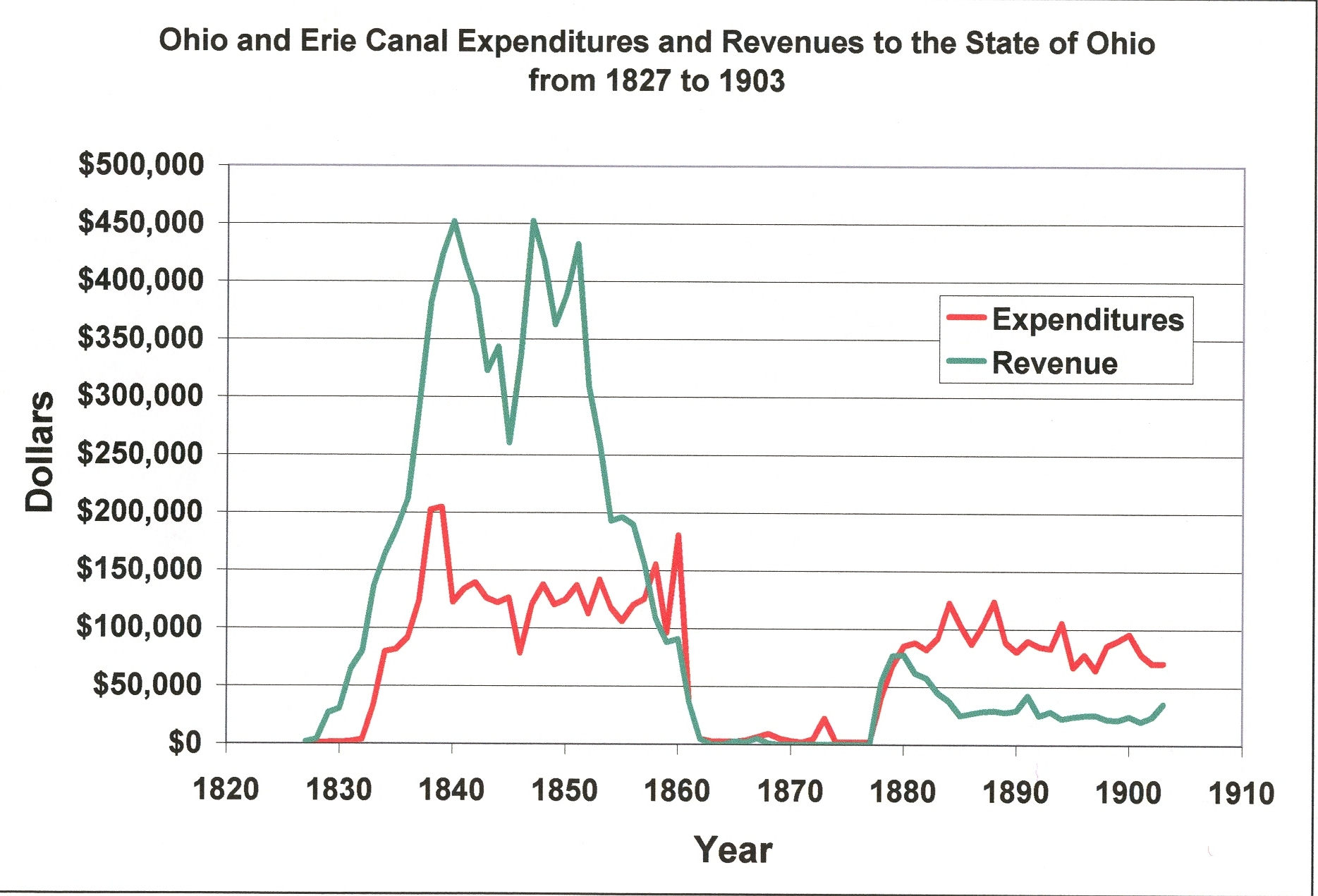
Graph showing the annual expenditures and revenues accrued to the State of Ohio by the Ohio and Erie Canal from 1827 to 1903.

During the next five years, more and more portions of the canal opened, with it finally being completed in 1832:

- 1828 – opens from Akron to Massillon, Ohio. The canal is 65 miles (105 km) long.
- 1829 – opens from Massillon to Dover, Ohio. The canal is 93 miles (150 km) long.
- 1830 – opens from Dover to Newark, Ohio. The canal is 177 miles (285 km) long.
- 1831 – opens from Newark to Chillicothe, Ohio. The canal is 258 miles (415 km) long.

In 1832, the Ohio and Erie Canal was completed. The entire canal system was 308 miles (496 km) long with 146 lift locks and a rise of 1,206 feet (368 m). In addition, there were five feeder canals that added 24.8 miles (39.9 km) and 6 additional locks to the system consisting of:

- Tuscarawas Feeder (3.2 miles)
- Walhonding Feeder (1.3 miles)
- Granville Feeder (6.1 miles)
- Muskinghum Side Cut (2.6 miles)
- Columbus Feeder (11.6 miles)

The canal's lock numbering system was oriented from the Lower Basin, near the southwest corner of the current Exchange and Main streets in Akron. North of the basin is Lock 1 North, and south of the basin is Lock 1 South. At this basin was the joining of the Pennsylvania and Ohio Canal.

=== Operation (1833–1913) ===
The Columbus Feeder Canal c. 1881–1885

The canals enjoyed a period of prosperity from the 1830s to the early 1860s, with maximum revenue between 1852 and 1855. During the 1840s, Ohio was the third most prosperous state, owing much of that growth to the canal. Immediately after the Civil War, it became apparent that railroads would take the canal's business. From 1861 until 1879, after the canal had been badly flooded, Ohio leased its canals to private owners who earned revenue from dwindling boat operation and the sale of water to factories and towns. When the state resumed ownership of the canals during 1879, it discovered that they had not been maintained well, and that state lands surrounding the canals had been sold illegally to private owners. In many cases, canals were filled in for "health reasons", with a newly laid railroad track on their right of way. Much state land was given away for free to politically savvy private owners. Nevertheless, some revenue was accrued into the early twentieth century from the sale of water rights as well as recovery and sale of land surrounding the canals.

=== Abandonment ===
After the maximum of the 1850s and a cessation of revenue due to the Civil War during the early 1860s, the canal's expenditures started to outgrow its revenues due to increasing maintenance costs. By 1911, most of the southern portion of the canal had been abandoned. The Great Flood of 1913 dumped an abnormally heavy amount of rain on the state, causing extensive flooding. This caused the reservoirs to spill over into the canals, destroying aqueducts, washing out banks, and devastating most of the locks. In Akron, Lock 1 was dynamited to allow backed up floodwater to flow.

== Notable persons associated with the canal ==
As a teenager during 1847, James Garfield worked as a "hoggee", driving mules to pull barges along the canal. After repeatedly falling into the canal on the job Garfield became ill and decided to go to college instead.

== The canal presently ==
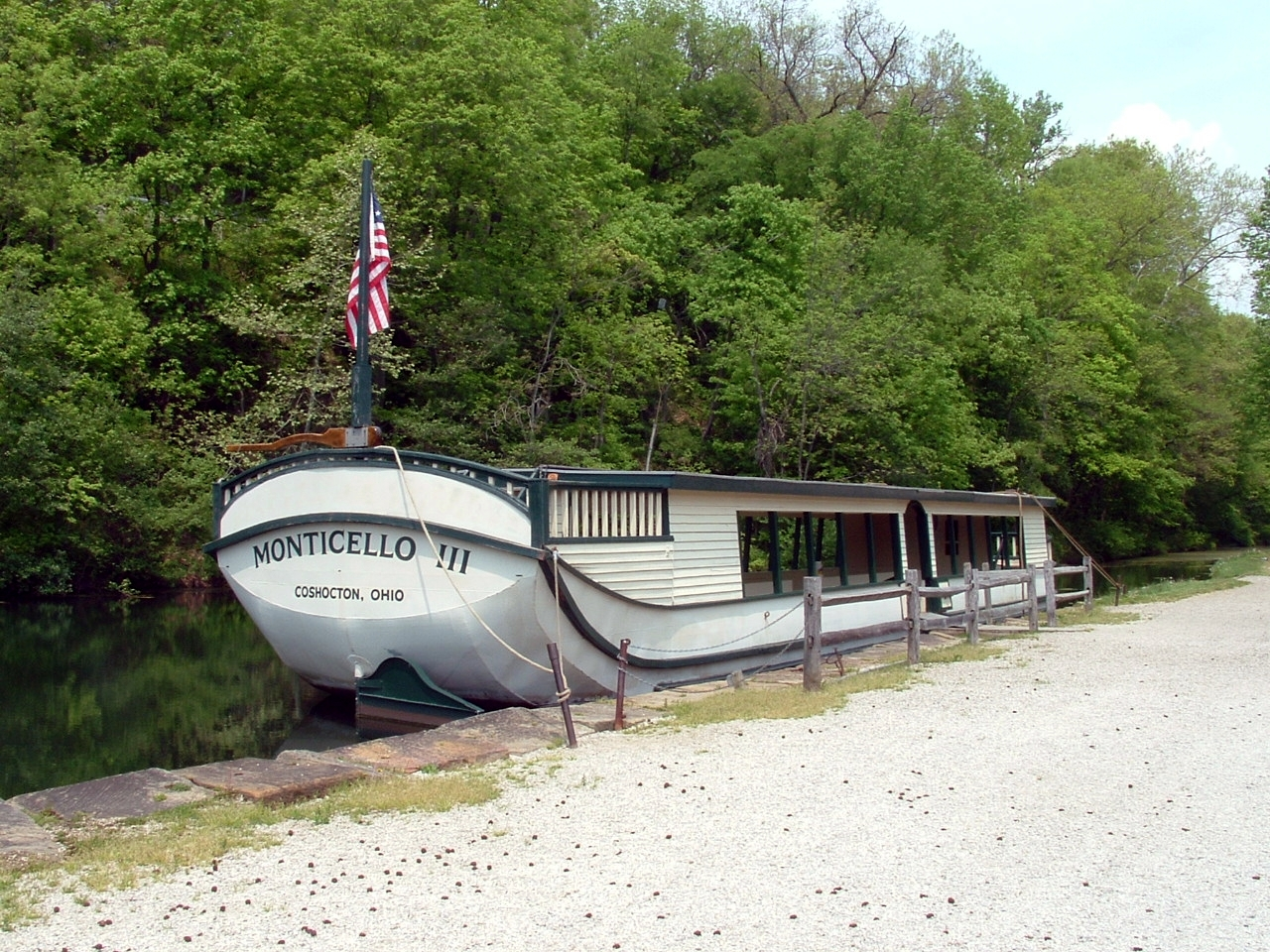
Restored canal boat

The Ohio and Erie Canal Historic District, a 24.5-acre (9.9 ha) historic district including part of the canal, was declared a National Historic Landmark in 1966. It is a four-mile (6 km) section within the village of Valley View comprising three locks, the Tinkers Creek Aqueduct, and two other structures.

A remaining watered section of the Ohio & Erie Canal is located in Summit County, Ohio. The Ohio & Erie Canal is maintained, to this day, as a water supply for local industries. After the flood, a few sections of the canal continued in use hauling cargo to local industries. Another watered section extends from the Station Road Bridge in Brecksville northwards into Valley View and Independence, all Cleveland suburbs.

The section of the Ohio & Erie Canal from the Brecksville Dam to Rockside Road in Cuyahoga County was transferred to the National Park Service during 1989 as part of the Cuyahoga Valley National Recreational Area (now known as the Cuyahoga Valley National Park).

A lease on the canal lands from the Cuyahoga Valley National Park to the terminus of the canal has been executed with the Cleveland Metroparks. The Metroparks manage the adjacent real estate and the surrounding Ohio & Erie Canal Reservation.

The section of the Ohio & Erie Canal still owned and maintained by the Division of Parks in southern Summit is referred to as the watered section. This section runs from downtown Akron, through Summit Lake south to Barberton, a distance of about 12 miles (19 km). Included in this section is the feeder canal from the Tuscarawas River and the hydraulics (flood control) at the Portage Lakes.

The Ohio & Erie Canal and its feeder reservoirs are maintained from Akron by a staff of three O.D.N.R. Ohio State Parks, Canal Hydraulic Operators. Like its sister canal, the Ohio & Erie Canal carries a large amount of stormwater. The canals were not designed to accommodate this great influx of stormwater. Most of the siltation and erosion problems experienced presently are the result of stormwater inappropriately piped into the canals over the years.

During late 1996, the canal from Zoar to Cleveland was designated a National Heritage Corridor. This designation was brought about through the efforts of many communities, civic organizations, businesses and individuals working in partnership.

Another section still watered, approximately one mile in length, runs along Canal Road in Pickaway County southwest of Circleville.

== Points of interest ==
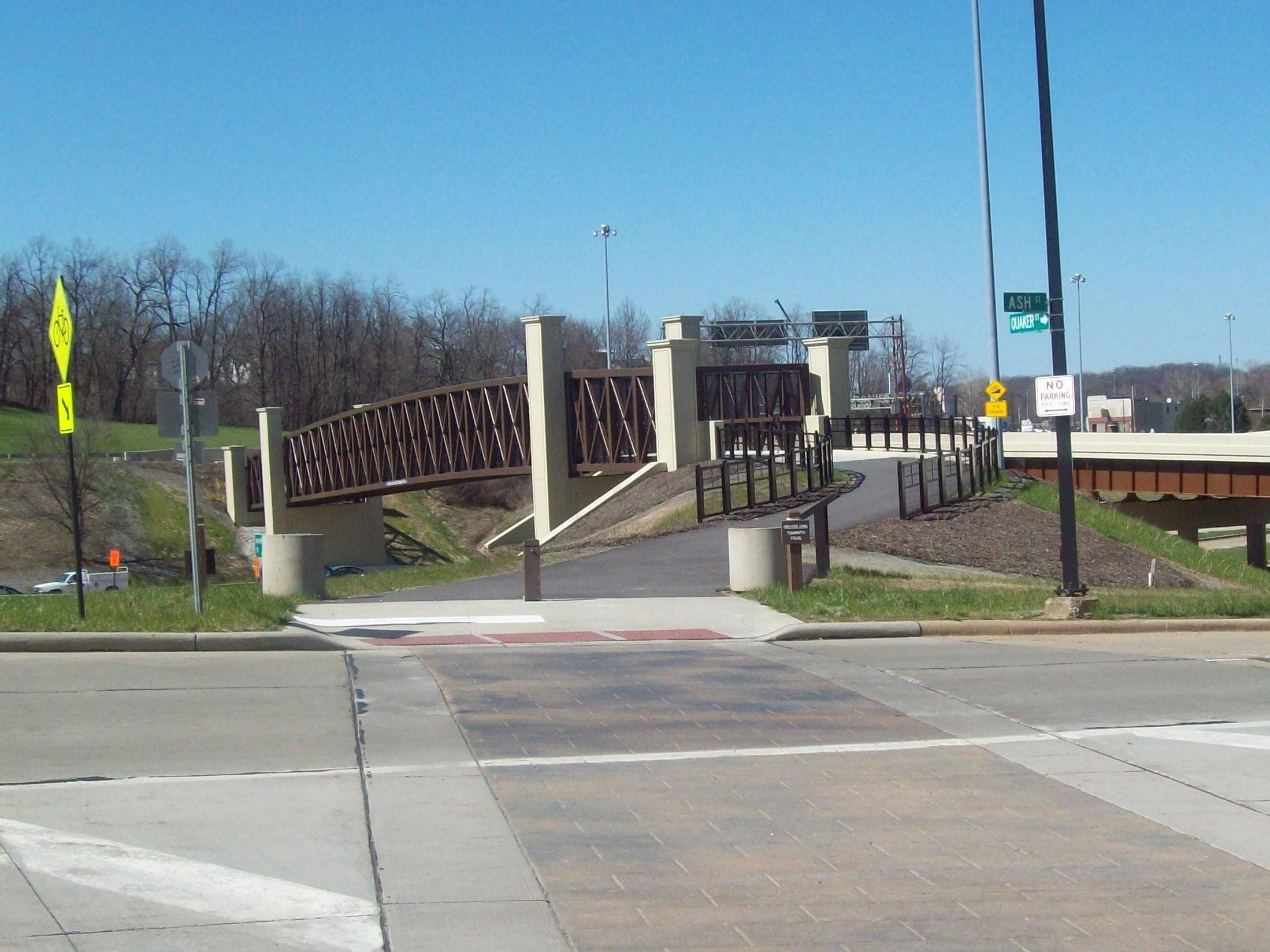
Towpath bridge across the Innerbelt in downtown Akron.

- Alexander's (a.k.a. Wilson's) Mill
- Richard Howe House (future site)
- Canal Visitor Center
- Frazee House
- St. Helena III Historic Boat Ride in Canal Fulton
- Mustill Store
- Peninsula Depot
- Station Road Bridge
- Tinkers Creek Aqueduct
- Fort Laurens - Ohio's only American Revolutionary War fort
- Restored canal town Historic Roscoe Village Roscoe Village (Coshocton, Ohio)
- Monticello III Canal Ride on Mudport Basin Roscoe Village (Coshocton, Ohio)
- Restored Walhonding Aqueduct Bridge Roscoe Village (Coshocton, Ohio)

=== Connecting canals ===
The Ohio and Erie Canal initially provided a connection between Akron and Lake Erie at Cleveland, then extending all the way to the Ohio River within a few years. Later, connecting canal systems were built connecting it with the Pennsylvania and Ohio Canal and other parts of Eastern Ohio.

Ohio and Erie Canal - Connecting canals
Coordinates	Elevation	Name	Description
		Columbus Feeder	Lockbourne, Columbus, Franklin County
		Granville Feeder	Granville, Licking County
		Hocking Valley	Carroll, Lancaster, Fairfield County; Logan, Hocking County; Nelsonville, Athens, Athens County
		Muskingum Side Cut	Dresden, Zanesville, Muskingum County; McConnelsville, Morgan County; Marietta, Washington County
		Pennsylvania and Ohio Canal	Akron, Summit County; Kent, Ravenna, Portage County; Warren, Trumbull County; Youngstown, Mahoning County; Ohio; Lawrence; Beaver, Beaver County; Allegheny, Pennsylvania
40°44′27″N 80°53′37″W	1,112 feet (339 m)	Sandy and Beaver Canal a.k.a. Tuscarawas Feeder	Bolivar, Tuscarawas County; Hanoverton, Lisbon, East Liverpool, Columbiana County; Glasgow, Beaver County, Pennsylvania
40°19′19″N 81°56′49″W	774 feet (236 m)	Walhonding Canal	Roscoe Village, Coshocton County; Brinkhaven, Knox County

=== Towpath Trail landmarks ===
An all-purpose bicycle/pedestrian trail was constructed by Cuyahoga Valley National Park in Southern Cuyahoga County and Northern Summit County, Cleveland Metroparks in Northern Cuyahoga County, and Akron/Summit County Metroparks in Southern Summit County to roughly follow the original Ohio and Erie Canal Towpath route. (The northernmost section in Cuyahoga County is still undergoing construction.) There are many connecting trails going to other points of interest throughout their park systems.

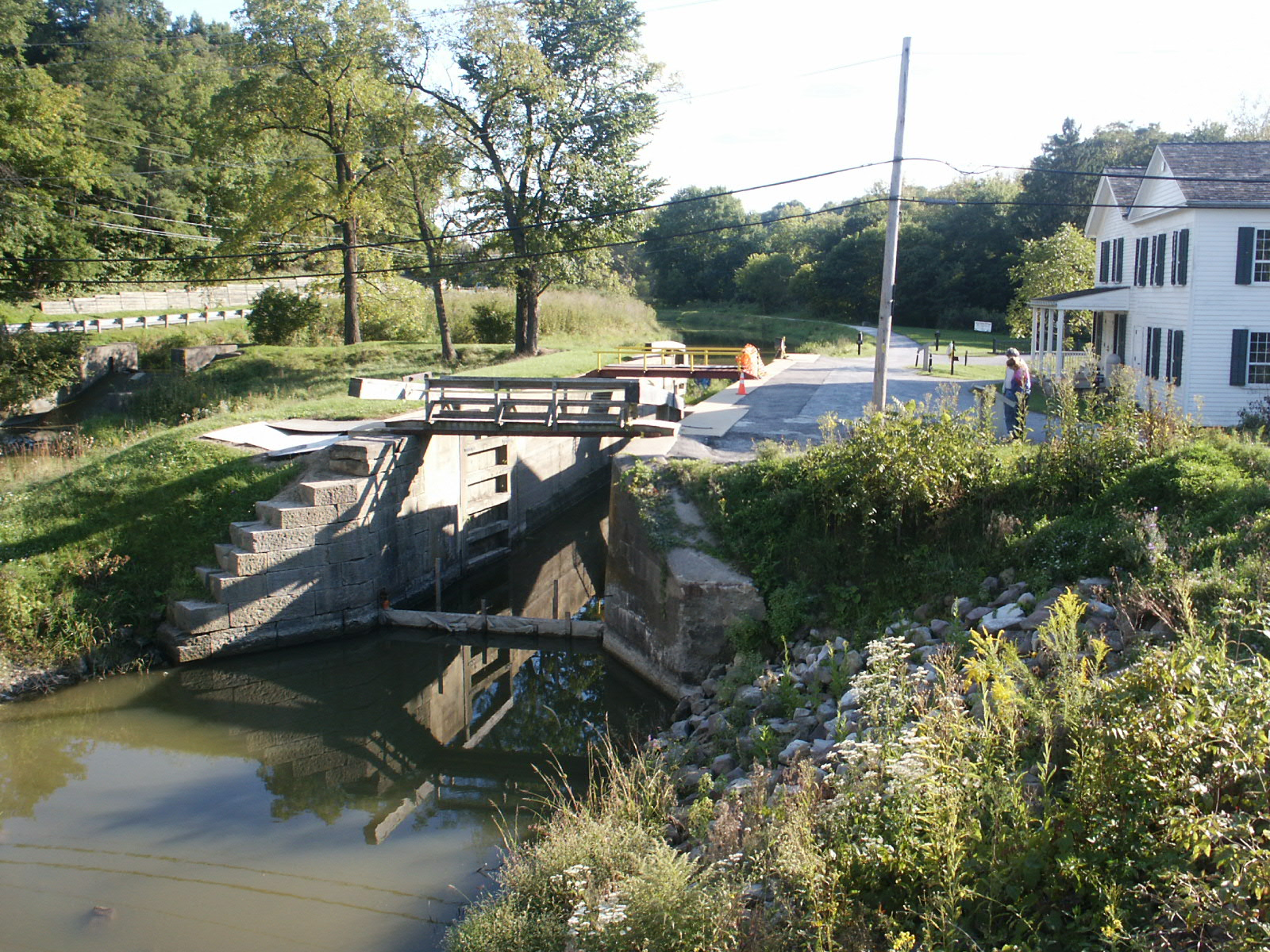
Restored canal Twelve Mile Lock 38, Cuyahoga Valley National Park

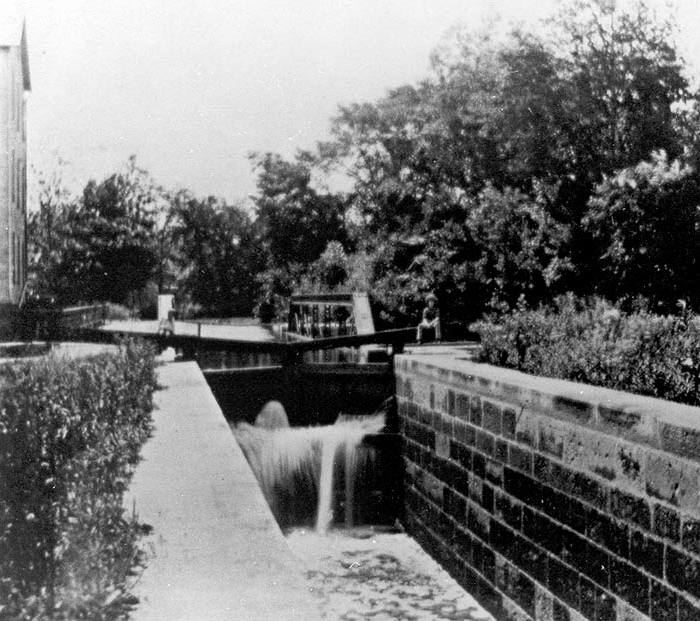
Peninsula Lock 29,
Peninsula Aqueduct steel trusses
over Cuyahoga River in background.

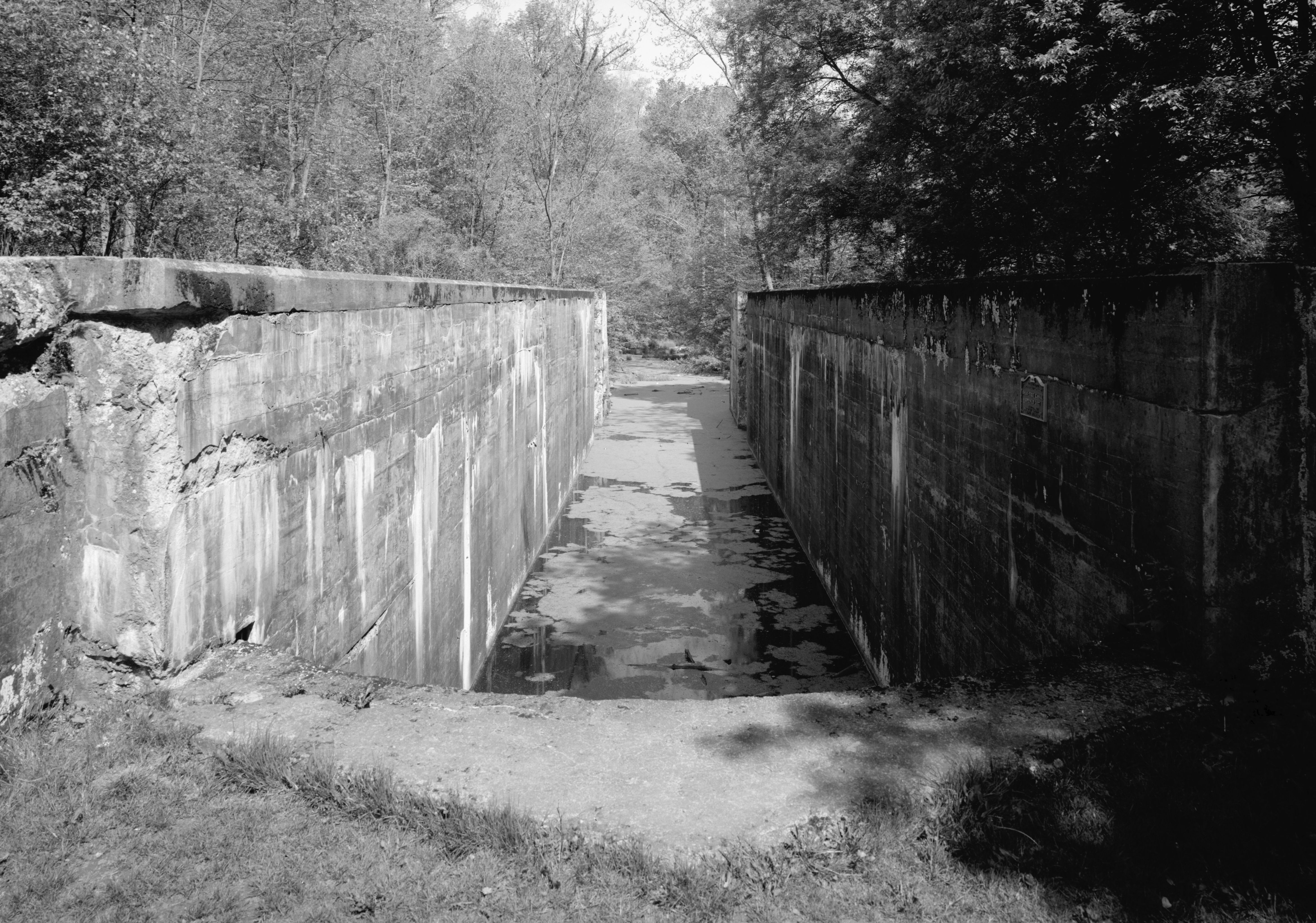
Deep Lock 28 as it existed in 1985
Ohio Canal system

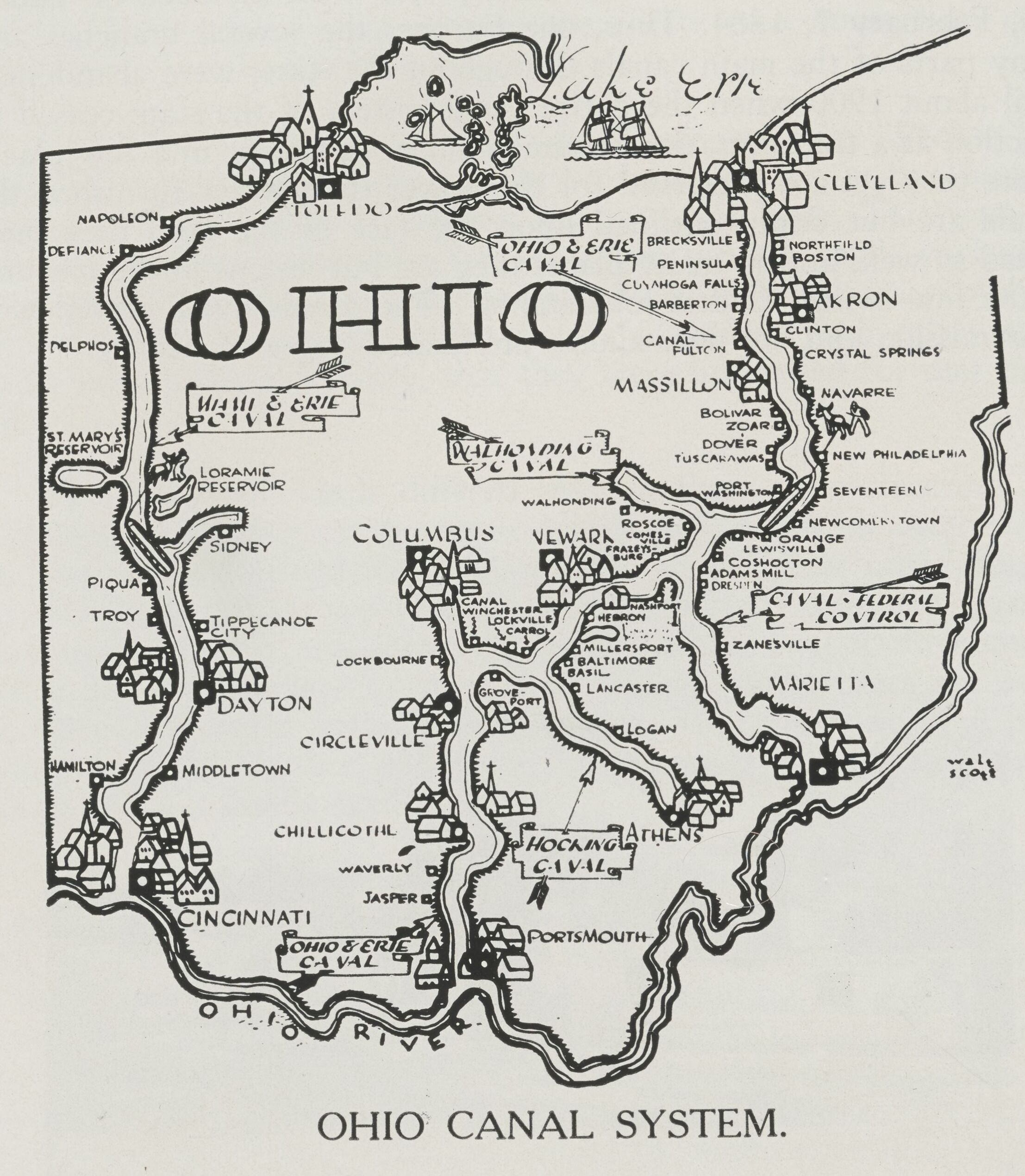
Drawing of the Ohio Canal System from early to mid 1900s

Ohio and Erie Canal Towpath Trail Landmarks
Mile Post	ID #	Coordinates	Elevation	Name	Type	Municipality	County	Description
0	44 North	41°29′39.76″N 81°42′10.4″W	0 feet (0 m)	Cuyahoga River Sloop	Lock	Cleveland	Cuyahoga	Merwin Street between James street and West street
	43 North		0 feet (0 m)		Lock	Cleveland	Cuyahoga	Sherwin Williams, James and West, Merrwin and Vineyard
			0 feet (0 m)	Weigh	Lock	Cleveland	Cuyahoga	Seneca a.k.a. West 3rd. street
3	42 North		0 feet (0 m)		Lock	Cleveland	Cuyahoga	relocated to 42A,
3	42A North		0 feet (0 m)	Weigh and Guard	Lock	Cleveland	Cuyahoga	near Grasselli chemical company, Dille street and Independence road
5	41 North	41°26′49.38″N 81°40′56.88″W	0 feet (0 m)	RathBuns	Lock		Cuyahoga	near Austin Powder Works, Harvard Road, near Jennings Road
8	40 North	41°25′8.82″N 81°38′38.58″W	0 feet (0 m)	Willow	Lock	Cuyahoga Heights	Cuyahoga	off Canal Road, near I-77
		41°25′2.53″N 81°38′18.88″W	0 feet (0 m)	Mill Creek	Aqueduct	Cuyahoga Heights	Cuyahoga	carries canal over Mill Creek (Cuyahoga River) off Canal Road
		41°24′57″N 81°38′2″W	0 feet (0 m)		GNIS			GNIS 17 Cleveland South topographic map
					Bridge		Cuyahoga	Rockside Road
					TrailHead		Cuyahoga	CVSR
11					MilePost Marker		Cuyahoga	
11	39 North	41°23′24.22″N 81°37′28.95″W	590 feet (180 m)		Lock	Independence	Cuyahoga	
		41°23′4″N 81°37′7″W	0 feet (0 m)		GNIS			GNIS 16 Shaker Heights topographic map
12					MilePost Marker		Cuyahoga	
					Bridge		Cuyahoga	Hillside Road
					TrailHead		Cuyahoga	CVSR-Canal Visitor Center, 7104 Canal Road and Hillside Road
12	38 North	41°22′20.78″N 81°36′46.23″W	600 feet (180 m)		Lock	Valley View	Cuyahoga	Canal Visitor Center
							Cuyahoga County	Tinkers Creek Road
13					MilePost Marker		Cuyahoga	
		41°21′53″N 81°36′32″W	610 feet (190 m)	Tinkers Creek	Aqueduct		Cuyahoga	carries canal over Tinkers Creek (Cuyahoga River)
					Bridge		Cuyahoga	Alexander Road-Pleasant Valley Road
14	37 North	41°21′24.06″N 81°35′49.02″W	620 feet (190 m)		Lock		Cuyahoga	Alexander's Mill
					Mill		Cuyahoga	Alexanders (a.k.a. Wilsons)
14					MilePost Marker		Cuyahoga	
					Trailhead		Cuyahoga	Sagamore Road
15					MilePost Marker		Cuyahoga	
16					MilePost Marker		Cuyahoga	
		41°21′20″N 81°35′46″W	0 feet (0 m)		GNIS			GNIS 15 Northfield topographic map
17	36 North	41°19′23.06″N 81°35′11.9″W	0 feet (0 m)	Pinery Dam and Feeder	Lock		Summit	
					Bridge		Summit	SR-82
17					MilePost Marker		Summit	
					TrailHead		Summit	Station Road bridge to CVSR-Brecksville
19	35 North	41°18′45.43″N 81°34′59.89″W	0 feet (0 m)	Kettlewell Whiskey	Lock		Summit	
18					MilePost Marker		Summit	
					Trail		Summit	Old Carriage
					Trail		Summit	Old Carriage Connector
19					MilePost Marker		Summit	
20	34 North	41°17′21.08″N 81°33′51.99″W	0 feet (0 m)	Red	Lock		Summit	Jaite in southwestern Northfield Township
					TrailHead		Red Lock	
					Bridge		Summit	Highland Road
20					MilePost Marker		Summit	
20.5	33 North	41°16′33.52″N 81°33′38.14″W	0 feet (0 m)	Wallace	Lock		Summit	in Boston Township
21					MilePost Marker		Summit	
21	32 North	41°15′56″N 81°33′31″W	659 feet (201 m)	Boston	Lock		Summit	Boston Township
							Summit	Boston Mills Road
					TrailHead		Summit	CVSR-Boston Store
					Bridge		Summit	I-271 Southbound
					Bridge		Summit	I-271 Northbound
					Bridge		Summit	I-80 Westbound
					Bridge		Summit	I-80 Eastbound
22					MilePost Marker		Summit	
							Summit	Stumpy Basin
22	31 North	41°15′5.93″N 81°32′45.36″W	670 feet (200 m)	Lonesome	Lock		Summit	was in Boston Township
23					MilePost Marker		Summit	
23	30 North	41°14′44.04″N 81°33′14.87″W	680 feet (210 m)	Peninsula Feeder	Lock	Peninsula	Summit	
				Peninsula	TrailHead	Peninsula	Summit	CVSR
23	29 North	41°14′33.54″N 81°33′1.29″W	690 feet (210 m)	Peninsula	Lock	Peninsula	Summit	
		41°14′33.01″N 81°33′0.86″W	700 feet (210 m)	Peninsula	Aqueduct	Peninsula	Summit	carried canal over Cuyahoga River
					Bridge		Summit	SR-303
24					MilePost Marker		Summit	
25	28 North	41°13′57.38″N 81°33′6.77″W	700 feet (210 m)	Deep	Lock	Peninsula	Summit	at 17 feet (5.2 m) the deepest lock along the canal
					TrailHead		Summit	Deep Lock Quarry
25					MilePost Marker		Summit	
26					MilePost Marker		Summit	
27	27 North	41°12′16.25″N 81°34′15.43″W	710 feet (220 m)	Johnny Cake	Lock		Summit	
		41°12′7″N 81°34′21″W	718 feet (219 m)	Furnace Run	Aqueduct		Summit	carried canal over Furnace Run (Cuyahoga River)
27					MilePost Marker		Summit	
					Bridge		Summit	Bolanz Road
28					MilePost Marker		Summit	
							Summit	Beaver Marsh
28	26 North	41°11′7.74″N 81°34′52.05″W	718 feet (219 m)	Pancake	Lock		Summit	
				Ira	TrailHead		Summit	CVSR
29					MilePost Marker		Summit	
28	25 North	41°10′32.27″N 81°34′46.82″W	0 feet (0 m)	Mudcatcher	Lock		Summit	
30	24 North	41°10′20.5″N 81°34′40.93″W	0 feet (0 m)	Niles	Lock		Summit	
					Bridge		Summit	Yellow Creek (Cuyahoga River)
30					MilePost Marker		Summit	
					Bridge		Summit	Bath Road
				Indian Mound	TrailHead		Summit	CVSR
		41°3′57″N 81°32′12″W	0 feet (0 m)		GNIS			GNIS 14 Akron West topographic map
32	23 North		0 feet (0 m)	Booth port	Lock		Summit	sewer pipe
32	22 North			Booth port	Lock		Summit	Merriman sewer pipe
33	21 North				Lock		Summit	sewer over-flow
	20 North				Lock		Summit	train abutments
	19 North			Black Dog Crossing	Lock		Summit	near Hickory and Memorial
35	18 North				Lock		Summit	
36	17 North				Lock		Summit	
36	16 North				Lock		Summit	
36	15 North			Akron Mustill Store	Lock	Akron	Summit	
36	14 North				Lock	Akron	Summit	North Street
36	13 North				Lock	Akron	Summit	
36	12 North				Lock	Akron	Summit	
36	11 North				Lock	Akron	Summit	
36	10 North				Lock	Akron	Summit	
	9 North				Lock	Akron	Summit	north of Market street
	8 North				Lock	Akron	Summit	tunnel
37	7 North				Lock	Akron	Summit	middle tunnel
37	6 North				Lock	Akron	Summit	tunnel below parking deck North of Mill street
37	5 North				Lock	Akron	Summit	tunnel
37	4 North				Lock	Akron	Summit	tunnel
37	3 North				Lock	Akron	Summit	South Main street
38	2 North				Lock	Akron	Summit	Water street
38	1 North				Lock	Akron	Summit	West Exchange street
	0			Portage landing	Lock	Akron	Summit	Portage lakes, Manchester Road
	1 South			Wolf creek	Lock	Barberton	Summit	Snyder avenue
				Wolf creek	Aqueduct	Barberton	Summit	Snyder avenue
		40°54′37″N 81°37′51″W	0 feet (0 m)		GNIS			GNIS 13 Doylestown topographic map
	2 South				Lock	New Franklin	Stark	Center Road
	3 South				Lock	New Franklin	Stark	Center Road
		40°53′2″N 81°35′37″W	0 feet (0 m)		GNIS			GNIS 12 Canal Fulton topographic map
	4 South				Lock	Canal Fulton	Stark	
		40°47′43″N 81°31′22″W	0 feet (0 m)		GNIS			GNIS 11 Massillon topographic map
					Trailhead	Massillon	Stark	
		40°39′32″N 81°27′22″W	0 feet (0 m)		GNIS			GNIS 10 Bolivar topographic map
		39°58′17″N 82°29′15″W	0 feet (0 m)		GNIS			GNIS 9 Thornville topographic map
		39°53′22″N 82°32′21″W	0 feet (0 m)		GNIS			GNIS 8 Millersport topographic map
	5 South				Lock			
	5A South				Lock			
					Lock			
					Lock			
	31 South				Lock			
	32 South				Lock			
	33 South				Lock			
	North 20				Lock			
	North 19				Lock			
	North 18				Lock			
					Lock			
					Lock			
	North 1				Lock			
	North 0			Minthorn	Lock	Newark	Licking	
	South 0			Pugh	Lock			
	South 1		195	King Watson	Lock			Canal Road
		39°51′41″N 82°33′38″W	0 feet (0 m)		GNIS			GNIS 7 Baltimore topographic map
196	South 2			David Miller's White Mill	Lock	Baltimore	Fairfield	
197.4	South 3			Norris Mill	Lock	Baltimore	Fairfield	
	South 4			Short Level	Lock	Baltimore	Fairfield	
198	South 5			Dry Dock	Lock	Baltimore	Fairfield	
198.3	South 6			Mulnix Mill	Lock	Baltimore	Fairfield	
198.8	South 7			Wells Mill	Lock			Basil, Ohio
200	South 8	39° 50' 11.5254" -82° 37' 26.3994"		Bibler	Lock	Baltimore	Fairfield	Previous town Basil, Ohio Behind the water treatment plant.
208	South 9				Lock	Carroll	Fairfield	
	South 10				Lock	Carroll, Ohio	Fairfield	
206	South 11				Lock	Violet Township	Fairfield County, Ohio	Upper Lockville
	South 12			Tennis/Tennat	Lock			Lockville
	South 13			Rowe	Lock			Lockville
	South 14			Smallwood	Lock			
	South 15			Fickle Mill Short Level	Lock			Lockville
	South 16			Rover Short Level	Lock			Lockville
	South 17			Swimmer's	Lock			Lockville
	South 18			Creek	Lock			Lockvile
208				Walnet Creek Guard	Lock			
		39°51′16″N 82°52′19″W	0 feet (0 m)		GNIS			GNIS 6 Canal Winchester topographic map
210	South 19			Chaney's Mill	Lock	Canal Winchester		
210	South 20			Woolen	Lock	Canal Winchester		Gender Road
	South 21				Lock	Canal Winchester		near Glenarda Farms, Groveport Road
				George's Culvert		Canal Winchester		
	South 22	39°51'16"N 82° 52' 21"W		Groveport	Lock	Groveport	Franklin	Behind the Groveport Aquatic Recreation Center.
		39°51′14″N 82°52′34″W	0 feet (0 m)		GNIS			GNIS 5 Lockbourne topographic map
217	South 23				Lock	Lockbourne	Franklin	Canal Road
217	South 24				Lock	Lockbourne	Franklin	Canal Road
217	South 25				Lock	Lockbourne	Franklin	Canal Road
217.5	South 26				Lock	Lockbourne	Franklin	
218	South 27				Lock	Lockbourne	Franklin	Canal Road
218	South 28				Lock	Lockbourne	Franklin	under railroad track bed
	South 29				Lock			
	South 30				Lock	Lockbourne	Franklin	Lockmeadows Park
		39°48′45″N 82°43′37″W	0 feet (0 m)		GNIS			GNIS 4 Carroll topographic map
		39°45′0″N 82°39′49″W	0 feet (0 m)		GNIS			GNIS 3 Amanda topographic map
		39°39′55″N 82°58′8″W	0 feet (0 m)		GNIS			GNIS 2 Ashville topographic map
		40°25′20″N 81°24′17″W	0 feet (0 m)		GNIS			GNIS 1 New Philadelphia topographic map
				Columbus Feeder East Guard	Lock			
				Columbus Feeder West Guard	Lock			
226	South 31			Ashville Campbells Mill	Lock			
237	South 32			Aqueduct	Lock			Scioto River, West of Circleville
237				Circleville Feeder	Lock			Spunkytown
238	South 33				Lock			Wayne Township
238	South 34				Lock			Wayne Township
	South 35				Lock	Chillicothe, Ohio		
256	South 36				Lock	Chillicothe, Ohio		
258	South 37				Lock	Chillicothe, Ohio		parking lot
	South 38			Fifth Street	Lock	Chillicothe, Ohio		
261	South 39			Upper Lunbeck	Lock			
261	South 40			Lower Lunbeck	Lock	Scioto Township	Pickaway	near Renick Lane 601
	South 41			Tomlinsons	Lock			3 Locks Road, South of Chillicothe
	South 42			Tomlinsons	Lock			
	South 43			Tomlinsons	Lock			
				Tomlinsons Dam and Feeder Guard	Lock			
	South 44			Waverly	Lock			
280	South 45			U Pee Pee	Lock			
280	South 46			L Pee Pee	Lock			
291	South 47			Howards	Lock			near Robers 18 mi (29 km) Lock Farm
	South 48			Herod's	Lock			
	South 49			Rushs Brush Creek	Lock			
	South 50			Union Mills	Lock			
	South 51			Union Mills Moss	Lock			near Ohio State Route 239
	South 52			Union Mills	Lock			
305	South 53			Elbow	Lock			
	South 54				Lock	Portsmouth	Scioto County	
308	South 55	38°43'34.4172"N 83°01'52.9896"W		Ohio River Terminal	Lock	West Portsmouth	Scioto County	near Old River Road, Portsmouth/Alexandria

Travels through Cuyahoga, Summit, Stark, Licking, Franklin, Fairfield, Pickaway, and Scioto counties.

== See also ==
- Ohio & Erie Canalway (disambiguation)
- Canal Fulton, Ohio
- Chesapeake and Ohio Canal
- List of canals in the United States
- Massillon, Ohio
- Miami and Erie Canal
- Roscoe Village (Coshocton, Ohio)
- Valley View Bridge
- Zoar, Ohio

== Notes ==
A: In 2007-2008-? Tinkers Creek Aqueduct is undergoing renovation following flood damage from Tinkers Creek (Cuyahoga River) and Cuyahoga River
B: Ohio and Erie Canal Towpath Trail miles are measured from its original connection with Lake Erie at Lock 44, on the Cuyahoga River, and marked with a 3.3-foot-tall (1.0 m) sandstone obelisk at each mile mark.
