= Leesville Lake (Ohio) =

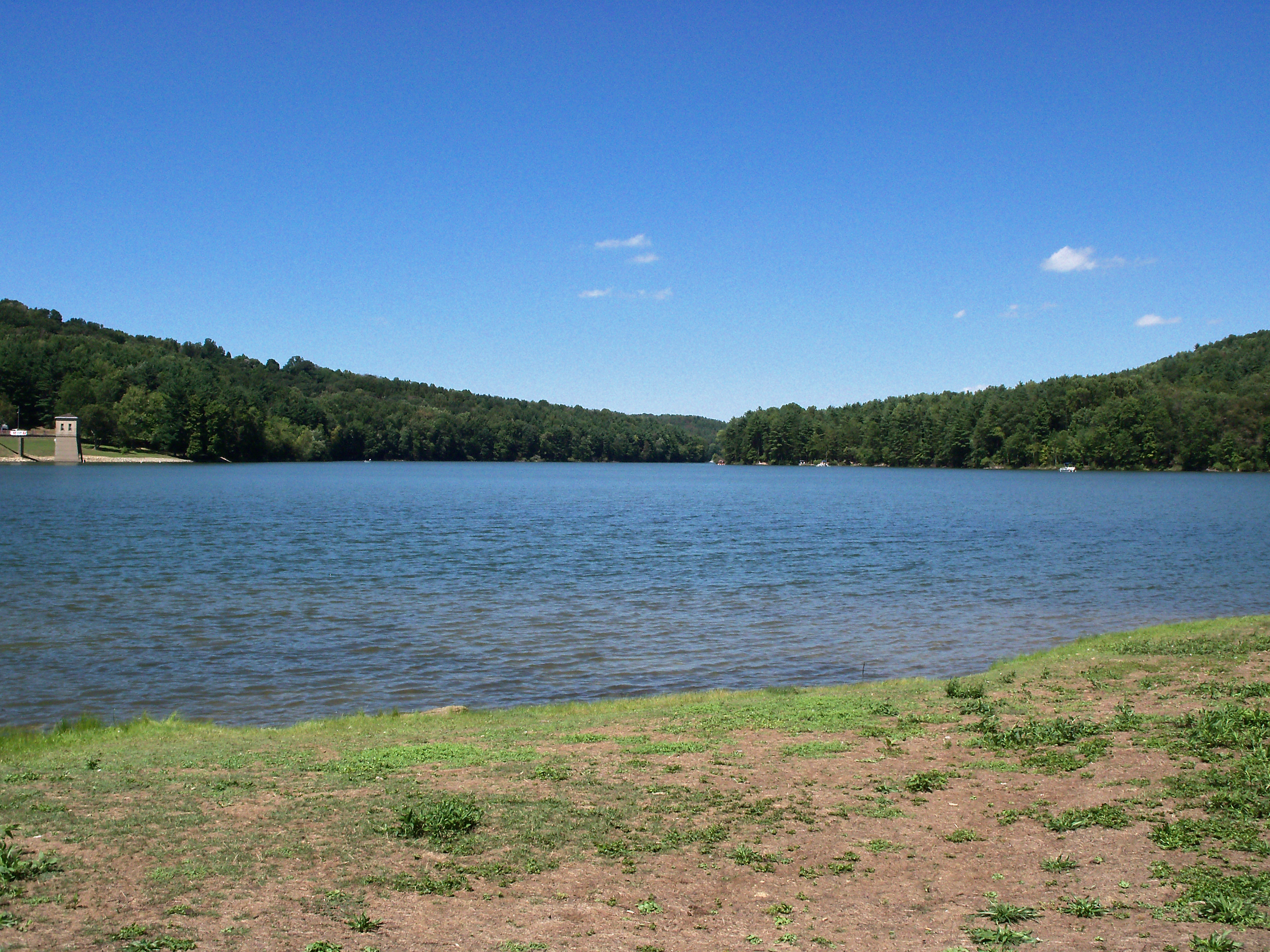
- Dam on left, north branch ahead

- Location within Ohio Location within the United States

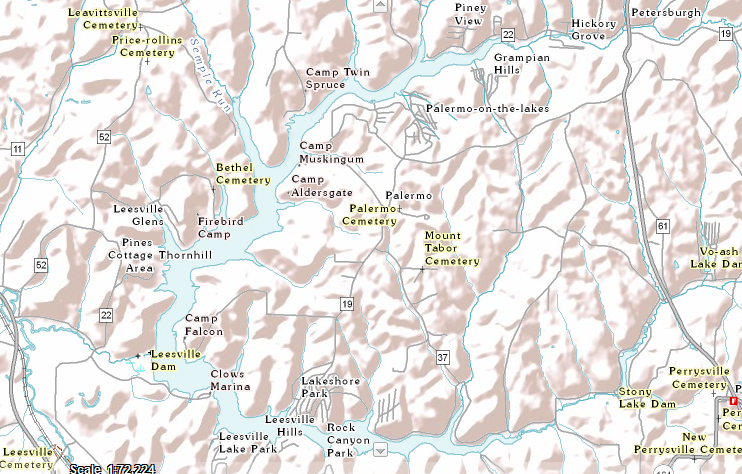
- Location: Orange, Monroe and Perry Township, Carroll County, Ohio
- Coordinates: 40°28′06″N 81°11′41″W
- Type: reservoir
- Primary inflows: McGuire Creek and others
- Primary outflows: McGuire Creek
- Catchment area: 48 sq mi (120 km^{2})
- Basin countries: United States
- Max. length: 4.6 mi (7.4 km) to 5.5 mi (8.9 km)
- Surface area: 1,000 acres (4.0 km^{2}) to 1,470 acres (5.9 km^{2})
- Water volume: 19,500 to 37,400 acre-feet (24,100,000 to 46,100,000 m^{3})
- Surface elevation: 963 ft (294 m) to 977.5 ft (297.9 m)

Leesville Lake is a reservoir located near Ohio State Route 212 and Leesville, Ohio. The lake is formed by Leesville Dam 40°28′6″N 81°11′41″W across McGuire Creek, a tributary of Conotton Creek . The lake is named for the village of Leesville.

The McGuire Creek forms the south branch of the C-shaped lake, while the north branch is formed by the North Fork McGuire Creek and Bear Hole Run. The Dam was completed in October, 1936 at a cost of $941,000 by the Muskingum Watershed Conservancy District. The operation of the lake and dam, along with the property immediately surrounding the dam site, was transferred to the U.S. Army Corps of Engineers, Huntington District, after the approval of the Flood Control Act of 1939 by Congress. The MWCD continues to be responsible for the management of much of the reservoir areas behind the dam, serving as a partner to the U.S. Army Corps of Engineers for flood reduction. In addition to operating a number of recreation facilities, the MWCD cooperates with the Ohio Division of Wildlife for fishing and hunting management.

== Leesville Dam ==
The Leesville Dam is a rolled earth fill with impervious core, maximum height 74 feet (23 m), top length 1,695 feet (517 m), top width 25 feet (7.6 m), base width about 450 feet (140 m). With a 4.1 feet (1.2 m) parapet wall on top of the dam with a top elevation of 995.1 feet (303.3 m).
Spillway: Uncontrolled concrete lined saddle spillway near left (south) abutment, crest elevation 977.5 feet (297.9 m), length of crest 150 feet (46 m), design discharge 19,700 cu ft/s (560 m^{3}/s) with surcharge of 12.6 feet (3.8 m) and freeboard of 5 feet (1.5 m).
Outlet Works: Intake structure with three sluices controlled by 3.5 by 7 feet (1.1 by 2.1 m) gates and discharges through a 7 feet (2.1 m) diameter horseshoe tunnel through the right abutment into a stilling basin. Two 1.5 feet (0.46 m) diameter siphons, located in front of the gates of the two outer sluices and discharging into the center sluice, are provided for maintaining the minimum pool.
Other Structures: none
Maximum flow of record at the dam site: 2,300 cu ft/s (65 m^{3}/s) (04-20-1940)
Reservoir design flood peak flow: 4,600 cu ft/s (130 m^{3}/s).

The normal pool level of the lake is 963 feet (294 m), at which a 1,000-acre (4.0 km^{2}) reservoir is formed. During times of excessive rain and snow melt, the corps of engineers can impound more water, up to a maximum possible level of 977.5 feet (297.9 m) with 1,470 acres (5.9 km^{2}). The highest pool of record is 971.46 feet (296.10 m) on June 25, 2019. Levels above normal can cause road closures near the lake. In November of each year the lake is lowered to winter pool of 958 feet (292 m) to allow more flood capacity, and to freeze and kill the roots of aquatic weeds. Levels are returned to summer pool in the spring.

== Recreation ==
=== Camping ===
Leesville North Fork Marina & Campground (formerly known as Petersburg Marina & Campground) is located on the north fork or Leesville Lake, a few miles off of Ohio State Route 332. The facility features boat rentals, dock rental, RV and primitive site rentals and cottage rentals.

=== Summer camps ===
The Salvation Army runs Camp Neosa at the lake.

The United Methodist Church runs Camp Aldersgate on the south side of the north fork of the lake.

Camp Wakonda is run by the Christ Presbyterian Church on the north side of the lake between NEOSA & Firebird Roosevelt.

The Ohio FFA runs Camp Muskingum on the south side of the north fork of the lake.

Camp Roosevelt Firebird is located on the north side of the lake. In February 2023, director and owner Joe Mendes announced his decision to sell Camp Roosevelt Firebird and close for the 2023 season. The closure of Firebird is due to his plans to retire. In August 2023, the camp was purchased by the Muskingum Watershed Conservancy District (MWCD).

Falcon Camp is located south of Camp Roosevelt Firebird on the opposite shore of the lake.

=== Community ===
The Leesville Lake POA is becoming active for the first time in many years. Its meeting place is on Autumn Rd just off of the lake.

=== Fishing and boating ===
Leesville Lake continues to be the top muskellunge lake in the state of Ohio, with several record muskies caught over the years. Both Leesville North Fork Marina & Campground, and Leesville South Fork Marina offer boat rental, cabin rental, dock rental and bait & tackle. More information is available at www.LeesvilleLake.com
