= Ohio State Route 212 =

State highway in eastern Ohio, US

State Route 212

Route information
- Maintained by ODOT
- Length: 32.09 mi (51.64 km)

Major junctions
- West end: US 250 near Beach City
- I-77 in Bolivar; SR 800 near Zoar; SR 39 in Sherrodsville
- East end: SR 151 in Bowerston

Location
- Country: United States
- State: Ohio
- Counties: Stark, Tuscarawas, Carroll, Harrison

Highway system
- Ohio State Highway System; Interstate; US; State; Scenic
← SR 211	→ SR 213

State Route 212 (SR 212) is a two-lane east–west state highway that runs within Stark, Tuscarawas, Carroll, and Harrison Counties in eastern Ohio. The western terminus of SR 212 is at U.S. Route 250 near Beach City, and its eastern terminus is at SR 151 in Bowerston. The route passes through rural areas but passes through small villages including Beach City, Bolivar, Zoar, Sherrodsville, and Leesville. It largely follows the valleys formed by the Tuscarawas River and Conotton Creek.

== Route description ==
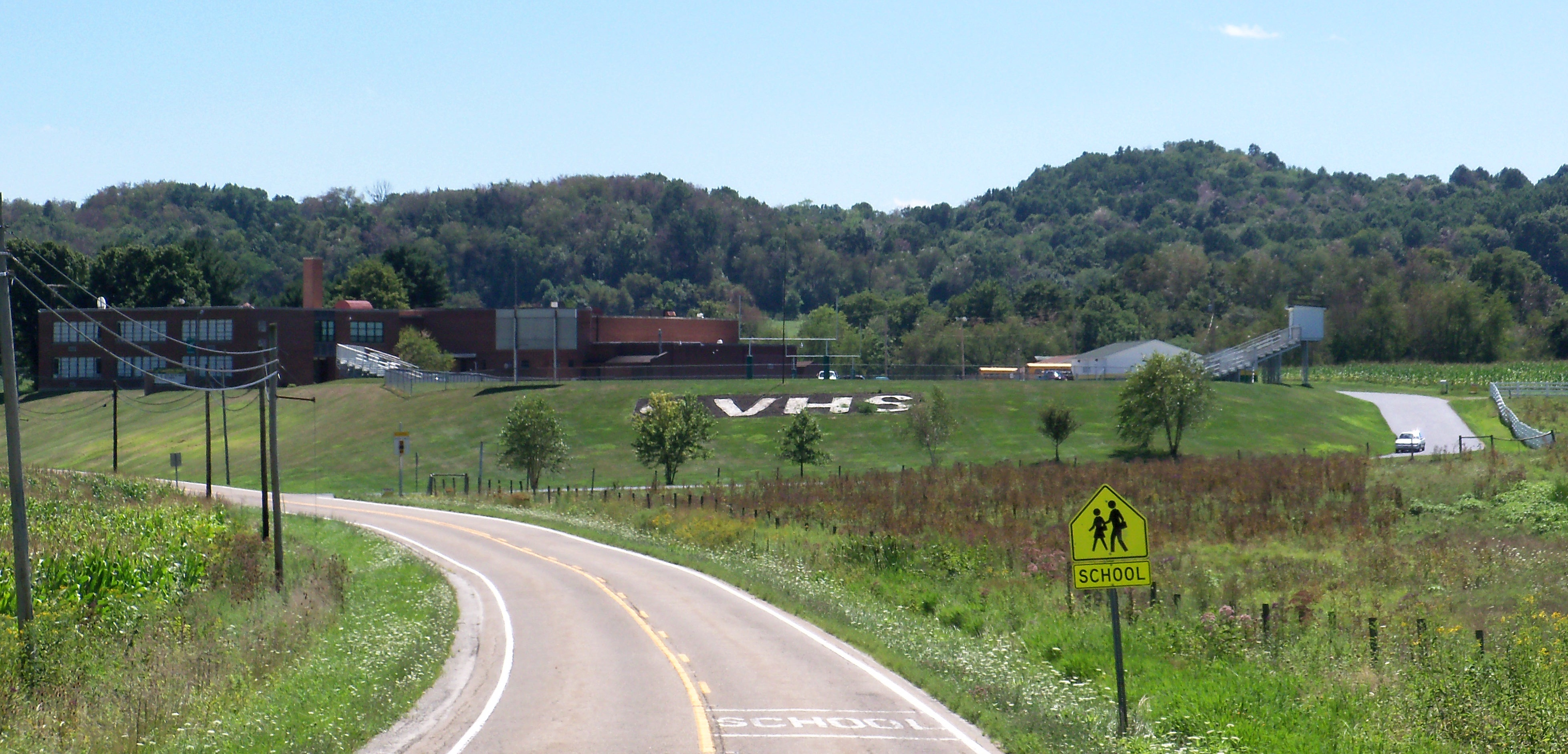
SR 212 as it passes Conotton Valley High School in Carroll County

SR 212 begins at a Y-intersection with US 250 in rural Sugar Creek Township in the southernmost portion of Stark County. The route heads northeast and almost immediately enters the village of Beach City as Redwood Street. In the center of the village, it intersects SR 93 (3rd Avenue) at a stop-controlled intersection. After exiting the village, the route passes the Beach City Airport before it begins to follow the Stark–Tuscarawas county line for about one mile (1.6 km). While on the county line, SR 212 intersects SR 21. The entire right-of-way of SR 212 briefly reenters Stark County before fully entering Tuscarawas County. In this area, the route crosses the Tuscarawas River twice. The route enters Bolivar on Poplar Street and travels through a residential neighborhood before coming to an intersection with Park Avenue. SR 212 heads south along Park Avenue heading through more residential areas before making a left turn onto an unnamed road south of the downtown area. Just past this intersection, SR 212 has an interchange with Interstate 77 at its exit 93. After crossing the Tuscarawas River again, the route heads southeast paralleling the river. After passing through the village of Zoar, SR 212 reaches a T-intersection with SR 800 in Fairfield Township.

The two routes form a concurrency and together head northeast into Sandy Township. While the Tuscarawas River heads south towards Dover, SR 212 now begins to follow the Conotton Creek which it will for the remainder of the route. After 0.4 miles (0.64 km), SR 212 breaks off of the SR 800 concurrency, the latter heads north towards Mineral City. SR 212 crosses the Conotton Creek and parallels it through Fairfield and Warren townships. In Warren Township, the route passes over the top of the Atwood Lake dam and intersects the marina entrance to the lake. It crosses into Carroll County and intersects SR 542 at its southern terminus. SR 542 heads north and provides access to small resorts along the lake's shoreline. One-quarter mile (0.40 km) later, SR 212 comes to an intersection with SR 39. SR 39 heads northeast towards Dellroy and Carrollton while SR 39 and SR 212 form a concurrency south into Sherrodsville on Church Street. In the geographic center of the village, SR 39 curves to the west but SR 212 branches off to the southeast on Sherrod Avenue, makes many curves, and passes through the business district of Sherrodsville. Now in Orange Township, the route (also named Cumberland Road) heads southeast still paralleling the Conotton Creek. After passing the Conotton Valley High School, SR 212 enters Leesville on Union Street. In the center of the village, there is a traffic circle with Market Street (Carroll County Route 22). Two blocks south of the circle, SR 212 curves to the east on Green Street. At the southern village limits of Leesville, SR 212 intersects the southern terminus of SR 164 which travels east from this point. Traveling in a more south-southeast direction, SR 212 exits Carroll County and enters Harrison County for the last 0.6 miles (0.97 km) of the route. After clipping Monroe Township, SR 212 enters the village of Bowerston. The route ends at a T-intersection with SR 151 which bypasses the center of Bowerston to the north.

== History ==
Though within the same area of SR 212's current southern terminus, SR 212 was first designated in 1923 along a different route than where it travels today. The original 1923 route ran from the community of Station 15 (within Monroe Township, Harrison County) at SR 13 (modern-day US 250) to SR 151 in Bowerston. At this time, the only portion of modern-day SR 212 that was part of the state highway system was between Sherrodsville and Bowerston; this segment was signed as the westernmost portion of SR 151. In 1928, SR 151 and SR 212 switched routes, SR 212 now ran from Sherrodsville and Bowerston and SR 151 traveled west to Station 15. In 1939, SR 212 was extended north and west to Beach City along county routes and replacing all of SR 352 between Bolivar and US 250. Since then, no major changes have occurred to the routing of SR 212.

== Major intersections ==
County	Location	mi	km	Destinations	Notes
Stark	Sugar Creek Township	0.00	0.00	US 250 – Wilmot, Wooster	
Stark	Beach City	0.75	1.21	SR 93 (3rd Avenue)	
Stark–Tuscarawas county line	Bethlehem–Franklin township line	2.89	4.65	SR 21 – Massillion, Strasburg	
Stark	No major junctions				
Tuscarawas	Bolivar	8.80– 8.91	14.16– 14.34	I-77 – Cambridge, Cleveland	Exit 93 (I-77)
Tuscarawas	Fairfield Township	14.63	23.54	SR 800 south – Dover	Western end of SR 800 concurrency
Tuscarawas	Sandy Township	15.03	24.19	SR 800 north – Mineral City	Eastern end of SR 800 concurrency
Carroll	Monroe Township	23.96	38.56	SR 542 north (Lodge Road)	Southern terminus of SR 542
Carroll	Monroe Township	25.20	40.56	SR 39 east – Carrollton	Western end of SR 39 concurrency
Carroll	Sherrodsville	25.79	41.50	SR 39 west (North Church Street) – New Philadelphia	Eastern end of SR 39 concurrency
Carroll	Orange Township	30.39	48.91	SR 164 north (Amsterdam Road) – Perrysville	Southern terminus of SR 164
Harrison	Bowerston	32.09	51.64	SR 151 (Boyce Drive) – Scio	
1.000 mi = 1.609 km; 1.000 km = 0.621 mi: Concurrency terminus
