= Wilkshire Hills, Ohio =

- Census-designated place
- Location within Ohio Location within the United States
- Coordinates: 40°37′46″N 81°25′46″W
- Country: United States
- State: Ohio
- County: Tuscarawas
- Township: Lawrence

Area
  - Total: 4.64 sq mi (12.02 km^{2})
  - Land: 4.62 sq mi (11.97 km^{2})
  - Water: 0.019 sq mi (0.05 km^{2})
- Elevation: 984 ft (300 m)

Population (2020)
  - Total: 2,940
  - Density: 636.2/sq mi (245.65/km^{2})
- Time zone: UTC-5 (Eastern (EST))
  - Summer (DST): UTC-4 (EDT)
- ZIP Code: 44612 (Bolivar)
- Area codes: 330/234
- FIPS code: 39-85228
- GNIS feature ID: 2804701

Wilkshire Hills is an unincorporated community and census-designated place (CDP) in Tuscarawas County, Ohio, United States. As of the 2020 census, Wilkshire Hills had a population of 2,940. It was first listed as a CDP in the 2020 census.

The CDP is on the northern edge of Tuscarawas County, in the northeast corner of Lawrence Township. It is bordered to the northwest by the village of Bolivar, to the south by the village of Zoar, to the east by Sandy Township, and to the north by Pike Township and Bethlehem Township in Stark County. Wilkshire Golf Course is in the western part of the CDP.

Ohio State Route 212 passes through the community, leading northwest into Bolivar and southeast 15 miles (24 km) to Sherrodsville. Interstate 77 passes just to the northwest of Wilkshire Hills, with access from Exit 93 (Bolivar). I-77 leads north 11 miles (18 km) to Canton and south the same distance to Dover.

The Tuscarawas River forms the western border of Wilkshire Hills. The Tuscarawas, flowing south and west, is the main tributary of the Muskingum River, which flows south to the Ohio.

== Demographics ==
Historical population
Census	Pop.	Note	%±
2020	2,940		—
U.S. Decennial Census
