= Ohio State Route 542 =

State highway in Carroll County, Ohio, US

State Route 542

Route information
- Maintained by ODOT
- Length: 15.81 mi (25.44 km)
- Existed: 1937–present

Major junctions
- South end: SR 212 near Sherrodsville
- SR 39 in Dellroy
- North end: SR 183 in Magnolia

Location
- Country: United States
- State: Ohio
- Counties: Carroll

Highway system
- Ohio State Highway System; Interstate; US; State; Scenic
← SR 541	→ SR 543

State Route 542 (SR 542) is a state highway in western Carroll County, within the eastern side of Ohio. The route runs 15.8 miles (25.4 km) long and connects SR 212 near Sherrodsville to Magnolia at SR 183 by way of Dellroy and Atwood Lake.

== Route description ==
SR 542 begins at an intersection with SR 212 in Monroe Township. The route heads north-northeast on a slight incline. Near the apex of this incline, the route winds around some hills and gets within the view of Atwood Lake. As the road curves to the east, entrances to numerous villages on the lake shoreline line the highway. SR 542 enters the village limits of Dellroy on Main Street and reaches a signalized intersection with Smith Avenue. At this intersection, SR 39 heads to the south on Smith Avenue and east on Main Street; SR 542 heads to the west on Main and to the north on Smith. To the north of the intersection, the route passes through a small business district, residential homes, and a small park before curving northwest and crossing Atwood Lake on a causeway. After the causeway, SR 542 turns due west and crosses more small tributaries of the lake and passes near more small villages surrounding the lake. Before crossing the last bridge over the lake, the route turns north into hilly terrain. Shortly after entering the village of Magnolia on Main Street, the route ends at an intersection of Main Street and Carrollton Street. SR 183 heads west on Carrollton Street and continues north on Main Street from this point. The intersection is located about 0.03 miles (48 m) south of the Carroll–Stark county line.

== History ==
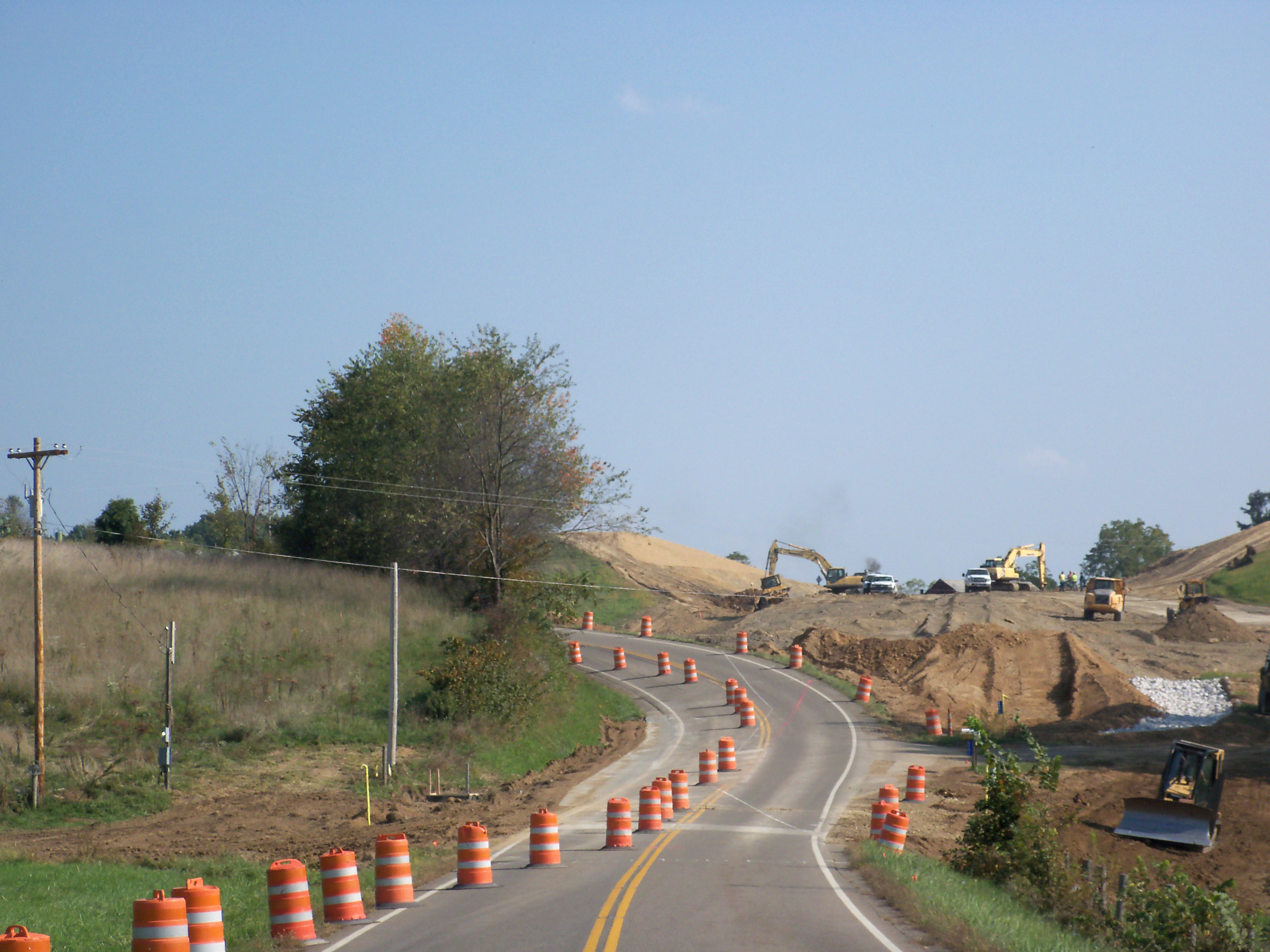
The road realignment project south of Magnolia ongoing in 2014

SR 542 was first designated on an alignment between Dellroy and Magnolia in 1937. The route at its designation was a gravel road but was fully paved by 1955. This alignment would remain until 1967 when SR 542 was extended south of Dellroy to SR 212. In 2014, a straightening project was initiated about two and a half miles (4.0 km) south of Magnolia on a sharp curve with a descent in elevation. The 2,000-foot-long (610 m) realignment project was completed on November 17, 2014. A 0.21-mile-long (0.34 km) segment of the old road, officially designated SR 542-J remains to serve existing access points.

== Major intersections ==
The entire route is in Carroll County.

Location	mi	km	Destinations	Notes
Monroe Township	0.00	0.00	SR 212 (Cumberland Road) to I-77 – Sherrodsville	
Dellroy	5.19	8.35	SR 39 (Main Street / Smith Avenue) – New Philadelphia, Carrollton	
Magnolia	15.81	25.44	SR 183 (Main Street / Carrollton Street) to SR 800 – Minerva, Alliance	
1.000 mi = 1.609 km; 1.000 km = 0.621 mi
