= Leavittsville, Ohio =

Unincorporated community in Ohio, U.S.

Coordinates: 40°30′49″N 81°11′46″W

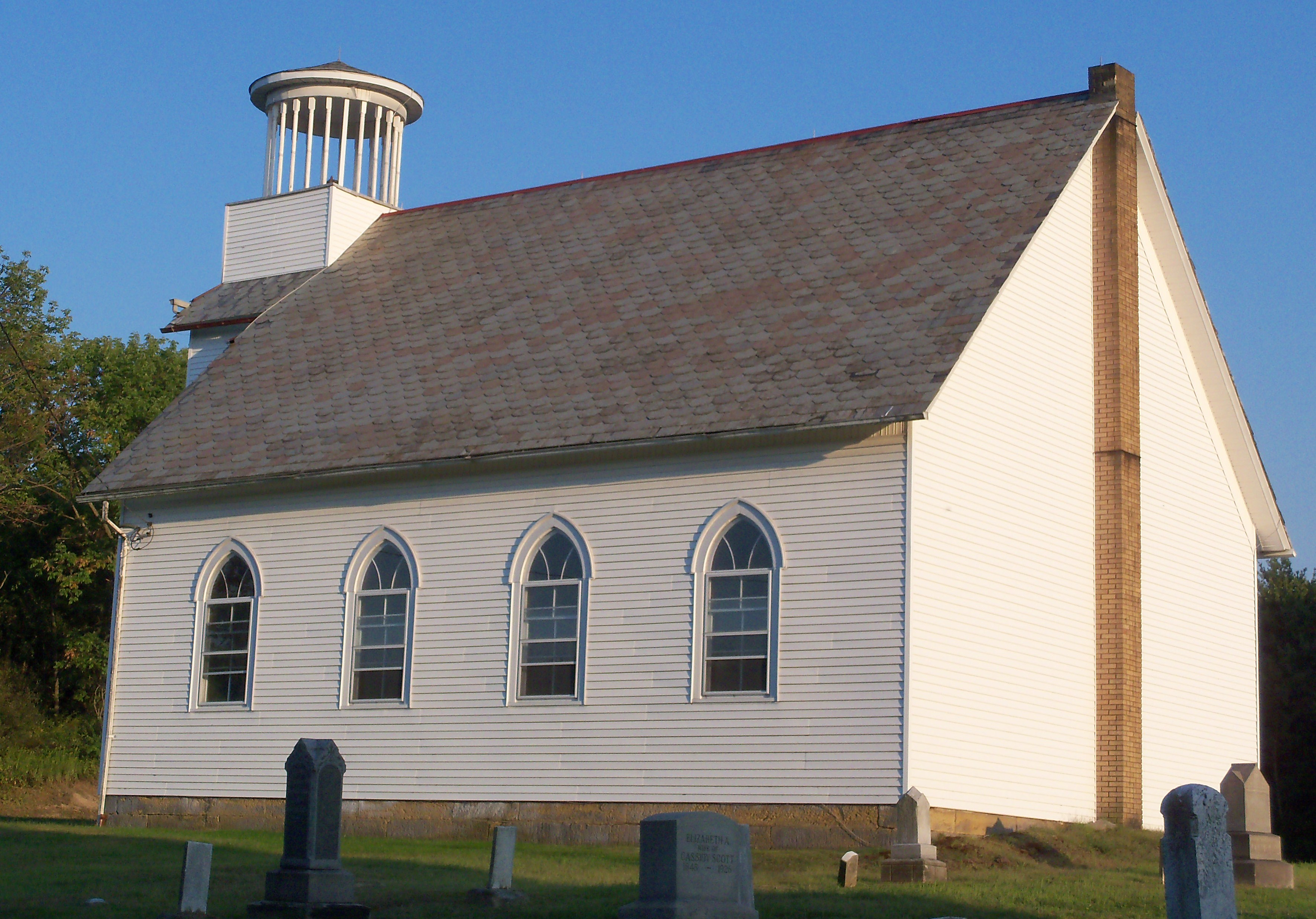
The Leavittsville ME Church and graveyard

Leavittsville is an unincorporated community in Monroe Township, Carroll County, Ohio, United States. The community is part of the Canton–Massillon Metropolitan Statistical Area. The community is served by the Sherrodsville post office, ZIP code 44675.

== History ==
The settlement was first known as "Monroe". The community was given the name Leavittsville in 1850 by Thomas James. A sandstone quarry operated nearby.

== Education ==
Students attend the Conotton Valley Union Local School District.
