= Somerdale, Ohio =

Unincorporated community in Ohio, U.S.

Coordinates: 40°33′59″N 81°21′38″W

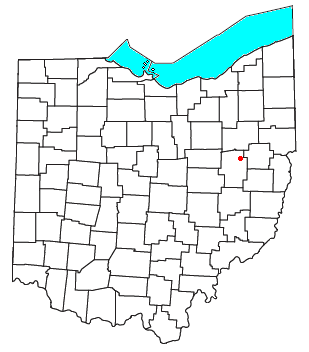
Location of Somerdale, Ohio

Somerdale is an unincorporated community in northeastern Fairfield Township, Tuscarawas County, Ohio, United States. It has a post office with the ZIP code 44678. It lies along State Route 212, Conotton Creek and the Wheeling and Lake Erie Railway east of Zoar.

== History ==
A post office called Somerdale has been in operation since 1887. Somerdale was originally a mining community and the Somerdale Coal Company operated there. Peak coal production at Somerdale was around the year 1900.
