= Lawrence Township, Tuscarawas County, Ohio =

Township in Ohio, US

- Township
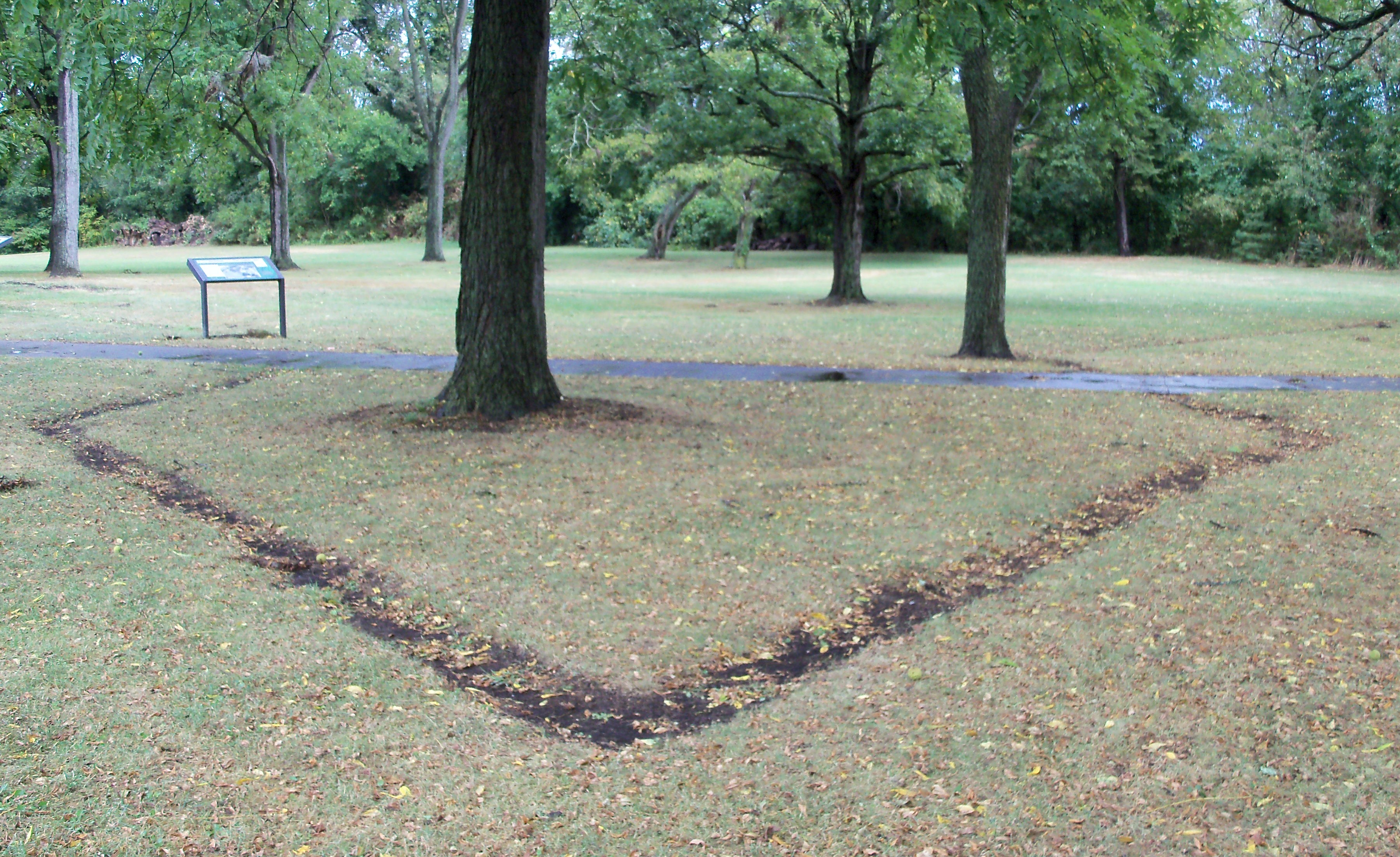
- Site of Fort Laurens

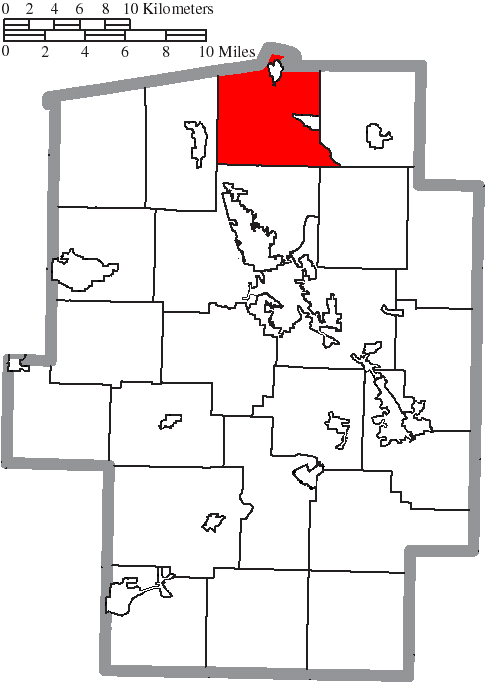
- Location of Lawrence Township in Tuscarawas County
- Coordinates: 40°37′39″N 81°27′8″W
- Country: United States
- State: Ohio
- County: Tuscarawas

Area
  - Total: 26.6 sq mi (69.0 km^{2})
  - Land: 26.5 sq mi (68.6 km^{2})
  - Water: 0.12 sq mi (0.3 km^{2})
- Elevation: 938 ft (286 m)

Population (2020)
  - Total: 5,870
  - Density: 152/sq mi (58.6/km^{2})
- Time zone: UTC-5 (Eastern (EST))
  - Summer (DST): UTC-4 (EDT)
- FIPS code: 39-42182
- GNIS feature ID: 1087058
- Website: https://www.lawrencetownship.org/

Lawrence Township is one of the twenty-two townships of Tuscarawas County, Ohio, United States. The 2020 census found 5,870 people in the township.

== Geography ==
Lawrence Township is the northernmost township in the county, it borders the following townships:

- Pike Township, Stark County - northeast
- Sandy Township - east
- Fairfield Township - southeast
- Dover Township - south
- Franklin Township - west
- Bethlehem Township, Stark County - northwest

Two villages are located in Lawrence Township: Bolivar in the north, and Zoar in the east. The census-designated place of Wilkshire Hills occupies the northeast corner of the township, between Bolivar and Zoar.

== Name and history ==
The first white settlement in Lawrence Township was Lawrenceville, founded by Abraham Mosser in 1805 opposite Bolivar on the Tuscarawas River in the area that is now Wilkshire Hills.

Statewide, other Lawrence Townships are located in Lawrence, Stark, and Washington counties.

== Government ==
The township is governed by a three-member board of trustees, who are elected in November of odd-numbered years to a four-year term beginning on the following January 1. Two are elected in the year after the presidential election and one is elected in the year before it. There is also an elected township fiscal officer, who serves a four-year term beginning on April 1 of the year after the election, which is held in November of the year before the presidential election. Vacancies in the fiscal officer-ship or on the board of trustees are filled by the remaining trustees. The current trustees are Donald Ackerman, Matt Ritterbeck, and Michael Haueter, and the fiscal officer is Ann Ackerman.
