= Warren Township, Tuscarawas County, Ohio =

Township in Ohio, US

- Township
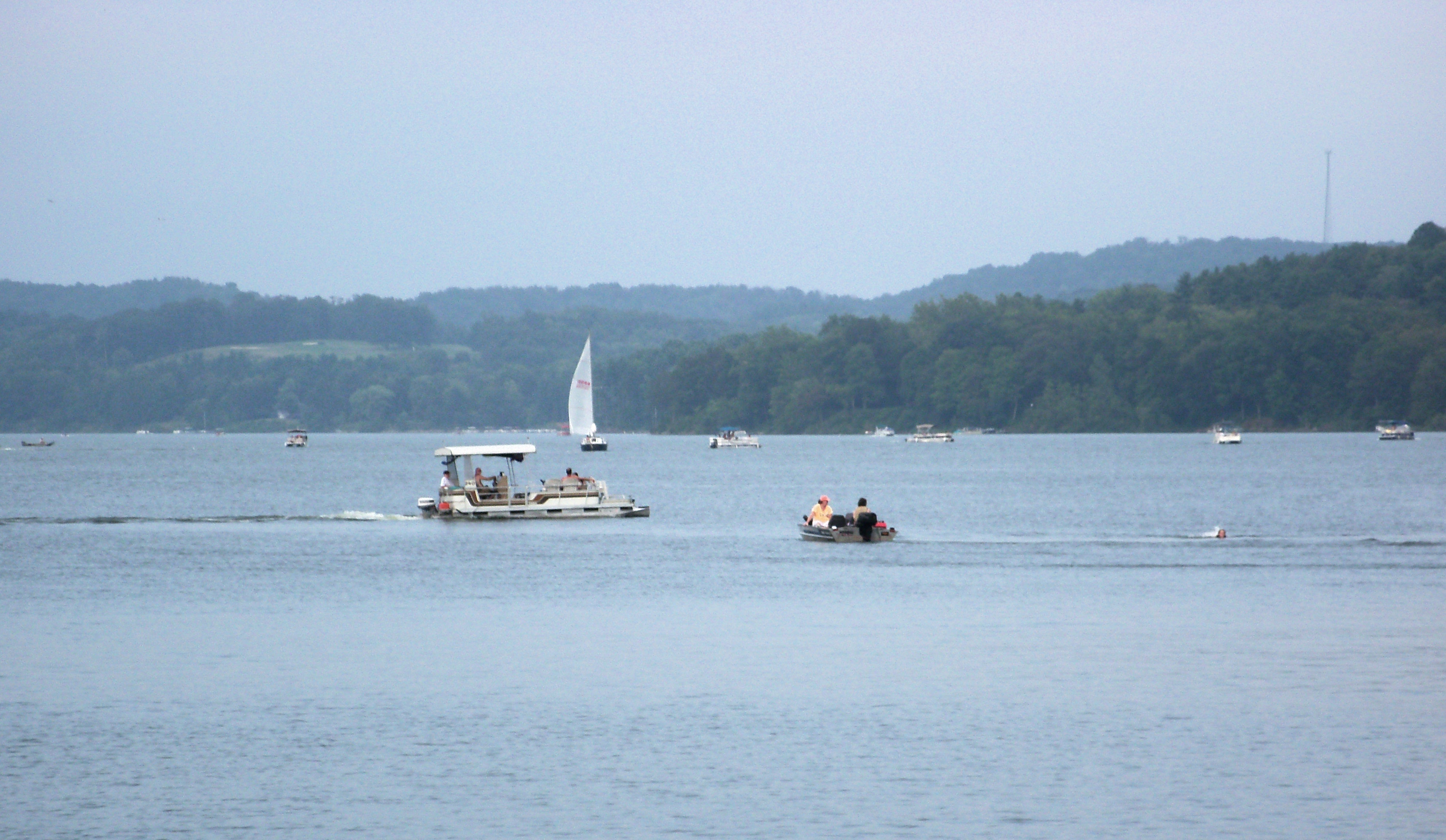
- Atwood Lake, seen from near the dam

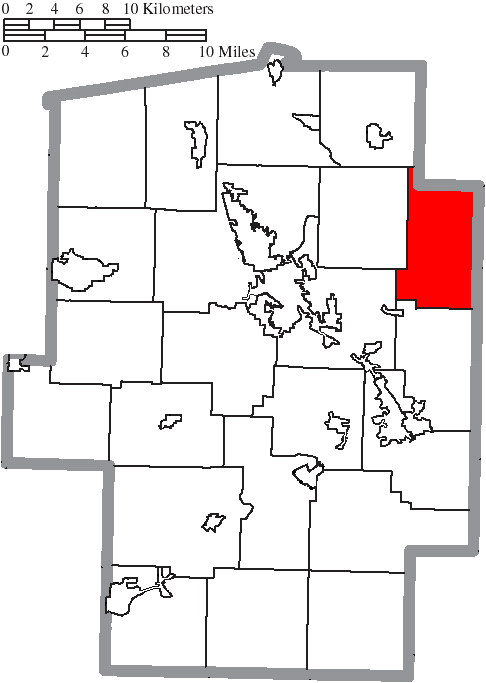
- Location of Warren Township in Tuscarawas County
- Coordinates: 40°31′35″N 81°17′45″W
- Country: United States
- State: Ohio
- County: Tuscarawas

Area
  - Total: 22.4 sq mi (58.1 km^{2})
  - Land: 21.7 sq mi (56.3 km^{2})
  - Water: 0.66 sq mi (1.7 km^{2})
- Elevation: 896 ft (273 m)

Population (2020)
  - Total: 1,078
  - Density: 49/sq mi (19.1/km^{2})
- Time zone: UTC-5 (Eastern (EST))
  - Summer (DST): UTC-4 (EDT)
- FIPS code: 39-80920
- GNIS feature ID: 1087068

Warren Township is one of the twenty-two townships of Tuscarawas County, Ohio, United States. The 2020 census found 1,078 people in the township.

== Geography ==
Located in the northeastern part of the county, it borders the following townships:

- Rose Township, Carroll County - north
- Monroe Township, Carroll County - northeast
- Orange Township, Carroll County - southeast
- Union Township - south
- Goshen Township - southwest
- Fairfield Township - west
- Sandy Township - northwest

No municipalities are located in Warren Township.

== Name and history ==
It is one of five Warren Townships statewide.

== Government ==
The township is governed by a three-member board of trustees, who are elected in November of odd-numbered years to a four-year term beginning on the following January 1. Two are elected in the year after the presidential election and one is elected in the year before it. There is also an elected township fiscal officer, who serves a four-year term beginning on April 1 of the year after the election, which is held in November of the year before the presidential election. Vacancies in the fiscal officership or on the board of trustees are filled by the remaining trustees.
