= Warren Township, Ohio =

Warren Township, Ohio may refer to:

- Warren Township, Belmont County, Ohio
- Warren Township, Jefferson County, Ohio
- Warren Township, Trumbull County, Ohio
- Warren Township, Tuscarawas County, Ohio
- Warren Township, Washington County, Ohio

== See also ==
- Warren Township (disambiguation)
