= Fort Laurens =

- U.S. National Register of Historic Places
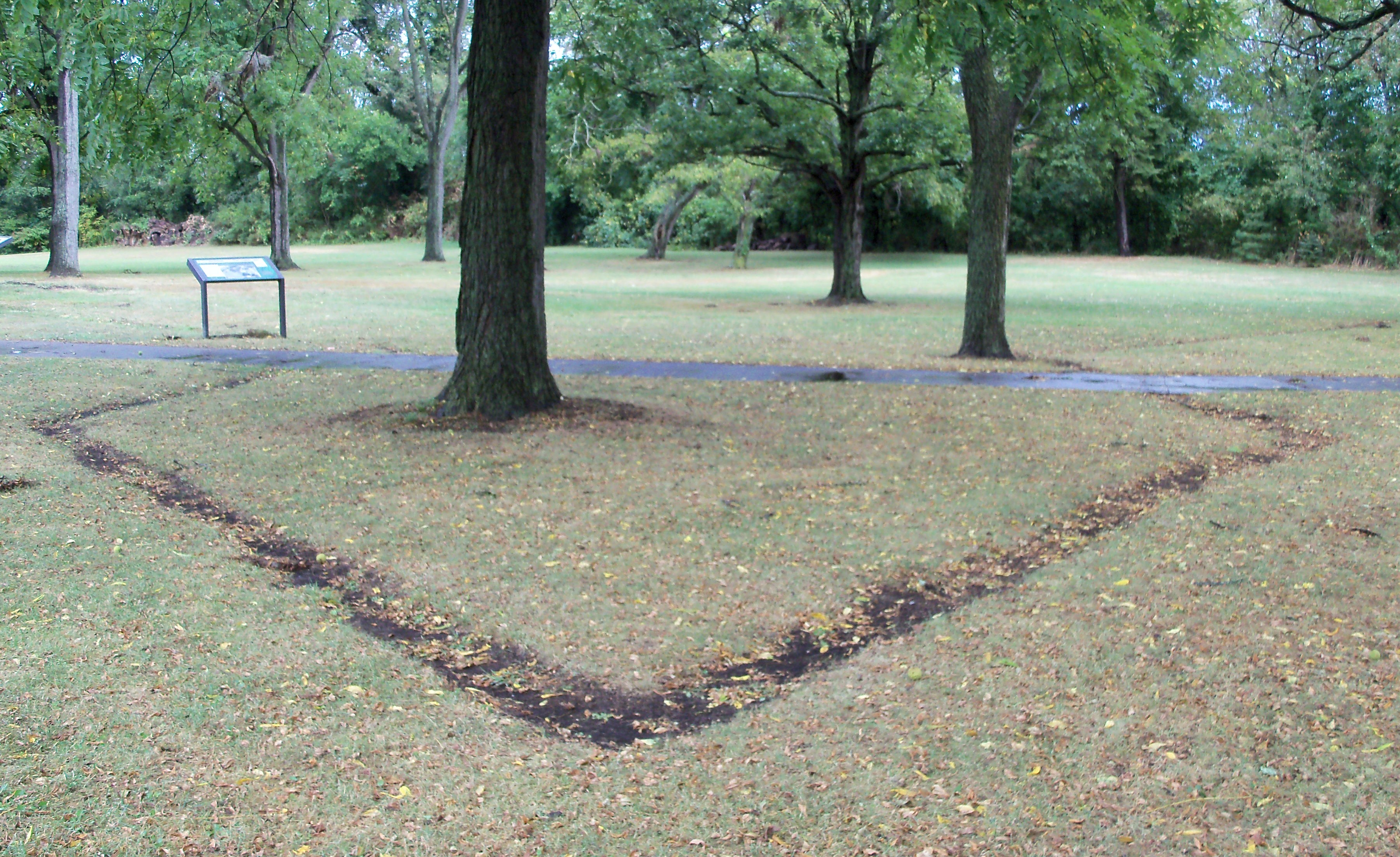
- Southwest bastion outlined on the ground at the site of the fort

- Location within Ohio Location within the United States
- Location: Lawrence Township, Tuscarawas County, Ohio
- Nearest city: Bolivar, Ohio
- Coordinates: 40°38′20″N 81°27′22″W
- Built: 1778
- NRHP reference No.: 70000518
- Added to NRHP: November 10, 1970

Fort Laurens was the only fortification built within the current boundaries of Ohio during the American Revolutionary War. It was constructed in the fall of 1778 on the Tuscarawas River near what is now Bolivar, Ohio. Fort Laurens was besieged by Indigenous and British forces for several weeks in the winter of 1779. The fort was ordered abandoned in August 1779. The site is now owned by the Ohio History Connection. None of the original fort remains above ground.

== Construction ==
In October 1778, a force of 1,200 regulars and militia led by Brigadier General Lachlan McIntosh departed Pittsburgh with the intention of attacking Wyandot settlements on the Sandusky River and eventually capturing Fort Detroit. By November, McIntosh had reached the Tuscarawas River, a tributary of the Muskingam River, where he ordered the construction of Fort Laurens on the west bank. The fort was a typical four-sided stockade with a square blockhouse located beside the landward gate. It was named after Henry Laurens, the president of the Second Continental Congress. A storehouse and barracks were built inside the fort. Due to a shortage of provisions, McIntosh decided in December to return to Pittsburg, leaving Colonel John Gibson, 19 officers and 152 men of the 13th Virginia Regiment to garrison the fort.

== Siege ==
At Detroit, the British learned of the fort's construction from their Indigenous allies. In January, British Indian Department interpreter Simon Girty was sent to scout the location. Girty brought with him a number of Mingo warriors and arrived at Fort Laurens on January 21, just as a small resupply column commanded by Captain John Clark of the 8th Pennsylvania reached the fort. Girty was too late to intercept the supplies but successfully ambushed the escort as it returned to Pittsburg. Two Americans were killed, four were wounded, and one was taken prisoner. Girty brought the prisoner to Detroit and requested that British regulars be assigned to help take the fort. Captain Henry Bird of the 8th Regiment and a small number of regulars volunteered to accompany Girty to the Wyandot village of Upper Sandusky were they were joined by roughly 180 Mingo and Wyandot. The siege of Fort Laurens began on February 22, 1779 when a work party was surprised outside the fort. 17 were killed and immediately scalped while two were taken prisoner.

The garrison suffered from a lack of warm clothing and provisions during the siege. Captain Benjamin Biggs of the 13th Virginia recalled, “The siege lasted 4 weeks, provisions exhausted; finally for 3 or 4 days had to live on half a biscuit a day—then the last two days washed their moccasons and broiled them for food, and broiled strips of old dried hides.”

Due to the harsh winter conditions, Bird lifted the siege after four weeks, shortly before American reinforcements arrived. Colonel Daniel Brodhead who had replaced McIntosh as commander of the Western Department of the Continental Army, soon decided that Fort Lauren's location was untenable and ordered the fort abandoned in August.

== Fort Laurens Museum & Park ==
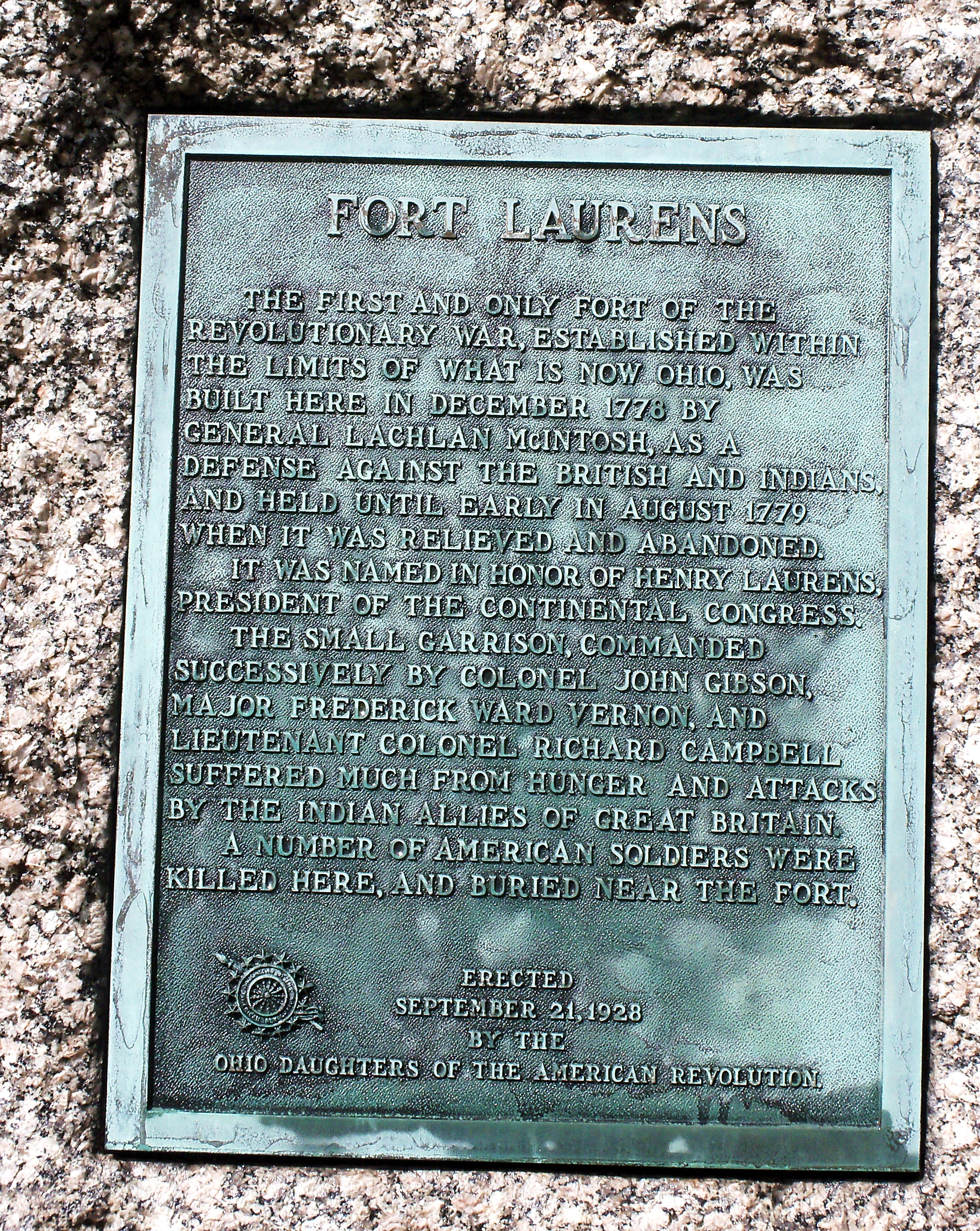

The Ohio History Connection owns the site which features a small museum operated by the Zoar Community Association. The museum's exhibits, displays and dioramas tell the story of the fort and its soldiers, and includes artifacts recovered during archaeological excavations in the 1970s. The museum is located in a large park that is used for military reenactments. While none of the fort remains above ground, a partial footprint has been cut into the turf and filled with wood chips, enabling visitors to see fort's shape and dimensions.

Anything that remained of the fort's east wall was destroyed in the 1832 during the construction of the Ohio and Erie Canal. In 1971, the Fort Laurens Site was added to the National Register of Historic Places. In 1972 and 1973, archaeological excavations revealed the fort's outline and located the fort's cemetery. In 1986 and 1987 the remains of the soldiers killed on February 22, 1779 were recovered from a mass grave. One of the soldiers was laid to rest with full military honors at the site's Tomb of the Unknown Patriot of the American Revolution. After osteological analysis the remains of the others were placed in a crypt in the museum's wall.

In 2024, the Ohio History Connection announced that funding to partially rebuild the fort had been obtained.
