= Earl Blackburn =

American baseball player (1892–1966)

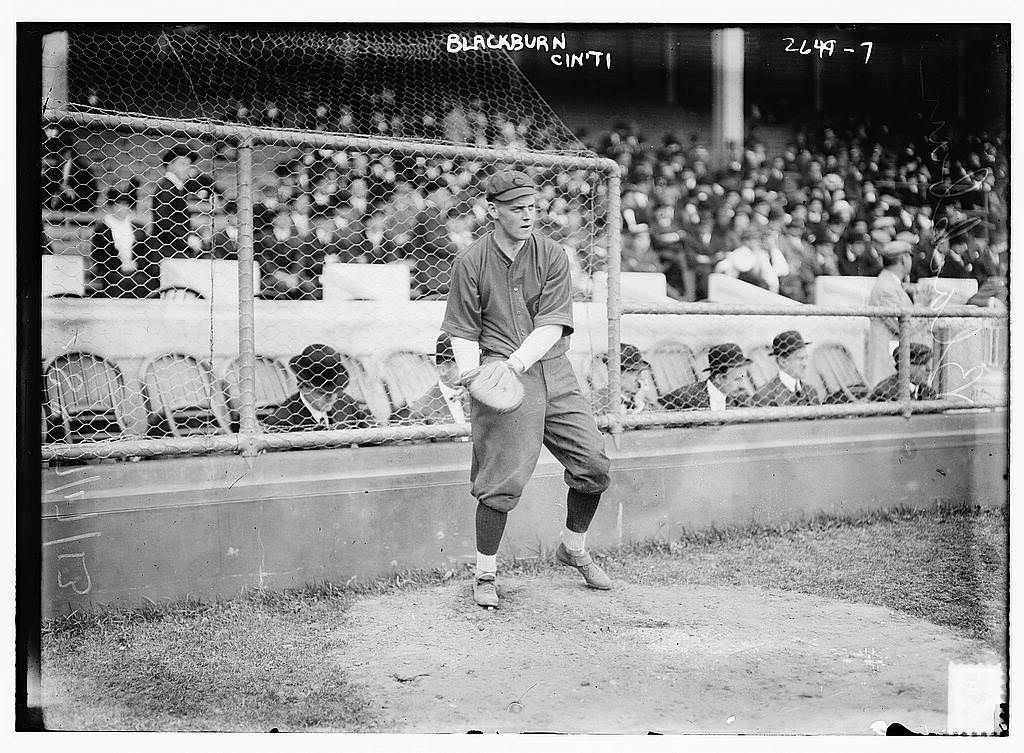
- Catcher
- Born: November 1, 1892; Leesville, Ohio, U.S.
- Died: August 3, 1966 (aged 73); Mansfield, Ohio, U.S.
- Batted: Right Threw: Right

MLB debut
- September 17, 1912, for the Pittsburgh Pirates

Last MLB appearance
- April 15, 1917, for the Chicago Cubs

MLB statistics
- Batting average: .262
- Home runs: 0
- Runs batted in: 10
- Stats at Baseball Reference

Teams
- Pittsburgh Pirates (1912); Cincinnati Reds (1912–1913); Boston Braves (1915–1916); Chicago Cubs (1917)

Earl Stuart Blackburn (November 1, 1892 – August 3, 1966) was an American right-handed catcher in Major League Baseball for the Pittsburgh Pirates, Cincinnati Reds, Boston Braves, and Chicago Cubs from 1912 to 1917.

Blackburn made his debut with the Pirates on September 17, 1912, appearing in the field but not coming to bat. It was a strange incident that he was traded to the Reds six days later and appeared in one game with Cincinnati before the season ended, walking in his only plate appearance. At season's end, when Blackburn was only 19, he was one of the only nine teenagers to appear in the major leagues that season.

He appeared in 17 more games with Cincinnati in 1913, going 7 for 27 at the plate with three RBI, before being relegated to the minors again. Blackburn resurfaced with Boston in 1915, going 1 for 6 at the plate in three games. Finally in 1916, Blackburn saw substantial major league playing time, hitting .273 in 47 games with the Braves as a backup to Hank Gowdy.

Boston traded Blackburn to the Chicago Cubs in January 1917. He appeared as a pinch-hitter for the Cubs twice early in the season, making his second and last appearance with the team on April 15. A veteran of five major league seasons by the age of 24, Blackburn nevertheless never made it back to the major leagues.

He died on August 3, 1966, in Mansfield, Ohio.
