= Mariah O'Brien =

American interior designer, former actress (born 1971)

- Born: Mariah Waterfall O'Brien; June 25, 1971 (age 55); Dellroy, Ohio, U.S.
- Occupations: Actress, model, interior designer
- Years active: 1992–2006
- Spouse: Giovanni Ribisi (m. 1997; div. 2001)
- Partner: Anthony Trae Carlson
- Children: 3

Mariah Waterfall O'Brien (born June 25, 1971) is an American interior designer and former actress and model. She made her film debut in the drama Gas, Food, Lodging (1992) and later appeared in the horror film Halloween: The Curse of Michael Myers (1995). O'Brien also featured in the music video for the 1991 Ozzy Osbourne single No More Tears and appeared on the cover of Alice in Chains' 1992 album Dirt.

== Early life ==
O'Brien was born on June 25, 1971 in Dellroy, Ohio. Her parents were musicians, and her middle name Waterfall was based on the Jimi Hendrix song. She is a distant relative of actor Edmond O'Brien. Her mother is actress Jackie O'Brien, with whom she appeared in the film Together & Alone. The family later moved to Los Angeles, where O'Brien appeared in local theaters productions.

== Career ==
=== Acting ===
O'Brien has appeared in films such as Gas, Food Lodging, Halloween: The Curse of Michael Myers, Being John Malkovich, Diamonds, Ticker, The Mod Squad, and Some Girl. Her television credits include Buffy the Vampire Slayer, Charmed, The Nanny, Once and Again and Courting Alex. She appeared as the primary character in the 1991 Ozzy Osbourne music video for "No More Tears".

=== Modeling ===
O'Brien appeared on the cover of Spinal Tap's 1992 single "Bitch School".

She is also featured on the cover of Alice in Chains' 1992 album Dirt.

== Personal life ==
O'Brien was married to actor Giovanni Ribisi from 1997 to 2001; they have a daughter, artist Lucia Santina Ribisi, born in 1997.

Since 2005, O'Brien works as an interior designer in Los Angeles and is the owner of Mariah O'Brien Interiors.

== Filmography ==
=== Film ===
Year	Title	Role	Notes
1992	Gas, Food Lodging	Ivy	
1995	Halloween: The Curse of Michael Myers	Beth	
1996	Welcome Says the Angel	Waitress	
1996	Kiss & Tell	Emma	
1998	Lone Greasers	Jezzabel	Short film
1998	Together & Alone	Buffy	
1998	Some Girl	Thrift Store Cashier	
1999	The Mod Squad	Tiffany	
1999	Being John Malkovich	Girl Creeped Out by Malkovich	
1999	Diamonds	Tiffany	
2000	Pussykat		
2001	Ordinary Madness	Betty	
2001	Puzzled	Alexandra Norton	
2001	Ticker	Desperate Woman	
2001	Lovely & Amazing	Kevin's TV Co-Star	
2004	Jam	Rose	Short film

=== Television ===
Year	Title	Role	Notes
1995	Nowhere Man	Nurse	Episode: "Absolute Zero"
1996	The Nanny	Young Jewish Woman	Episode: "That's Midlife"
1998	Charmed	Cynda	Episode: "Thank You for Not Morphing"
1998	Buffy the Vampire Slayer	Nancy	Episode: "The Wish"
1999	G vs E	Marci Welbi	Episode: "Men Are from Mars, Women Are Evil"
2001–2002	Once and Again	Brandi	2 episodes
2006	Courting Alex	Leah	Episode: "Big Client"
