= Conotton Valley Union Local School District =

School district in Ohio, US

Address
- 21 Mound Street Sherrodsville, Ohio, 44675; United States

District information
- Type: Public
- Grades: PreK–12
- NCES District ID: 3904754

Students and staff
- Students: 472
- Teachers: 33.25 (FTE)
- Staff: 152.79 (FTE)
- Student–teacher ratio: 14.2

Other information
- Website: www.cvul.org

The Conotton Valley Union Local School District is a public school district based in Bowerston, Ohio, United States. It serves northwestern Harrison County (including all of Monroe Township as well as portions of Franklin and North townships) and southwestern Carroll County (including all of Orange Township and portions of Monroe Township). Three incorporated villages are contained within the district: Bowerston, Leesville, and Sherrodsville.

== Schools ==
- Conotton Valley High School (Grades 6-12)
- Conotton Valley Elementary (Formerly both Bowerston Elementary until 2016, Sherrodsville Elementary until 2014) (Grades PreK, K, 1-5)

== See also ==
- East Central Ohio ESC
- List of school districts in Ohio
