= Atwood Lake =

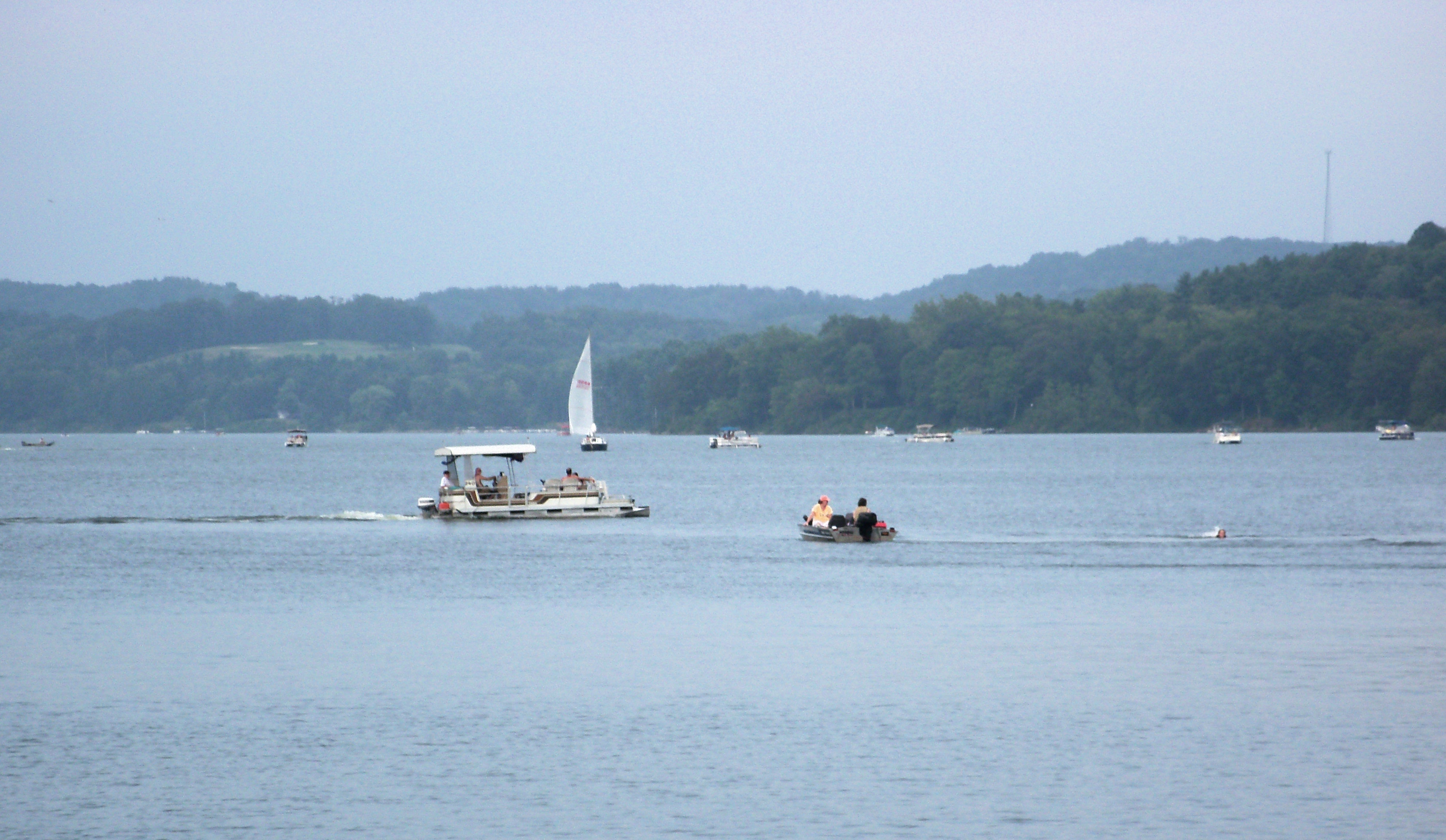

- Location within Ohio

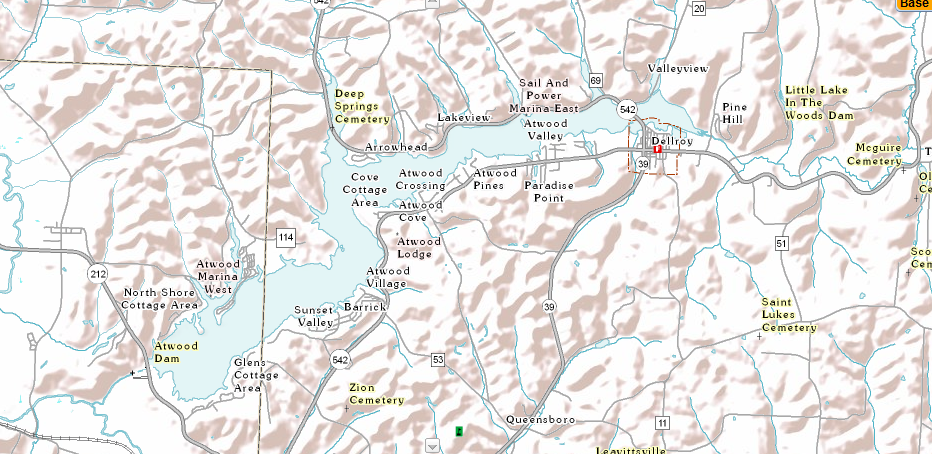
- Location: Carroll County / Tuscarawas County, Ohio, U.S.
- Coordinates: 40°31′36″N 81°17′05″W
- Type: reservoir
- Primary inflows: Indian Fork and others
- Primary outflows: Indian Fork
- Catchment area: 70 sq mi (180 km^{2})
- Basin countries: United States
- Max. length: 8.5 mi (13.7 km) to 10.7 mi (17.2 km)
- Surface area: 1,540 acres (6.2 km^{2}) to 2,460 acres (10.0 km^{2})
- Water volume: 23,600 to 49,700 acre-feet (29,100,000 to 61,300,000 m^{3})
- Surface elevation: 928 ft (283 m) to 941 ft (287 m)
- Settlements: Dellroy, Ohio

Atwood Lake is a reservoir located in Tuscarawas and Carroll counties in east central Ohio. The lake is formed by Atwood Dam 40°31′36″N 81°17′5″W across Indian Fork, a tributary of Conotton Creek. In addition to the Indian Fork, the lake also has coves to the north up Elliott Run, Willow Run and two unnamed streams along Bark Road and Ohio State Route 542.

The lake is named for the community of Atwood Village 40°31′36″N 81°17′5″W, which was purchased, demolished and inundated for the construction of Atwood Dam.

The dam was completed in September 1936 at a cost of $1,403,900 by the Muskingum Watershed Conservancy District. The operation of the lake and dam, along with the property immediately surrounding the dam site, was transferred to the U.S. Army Corps of Engineers, Huntington District, after the approval of the Flood Control Act of 1939 by Congress. The MWCD continues to be responsible for the management of much of the reservoir areas behind the dam serving as a partner to the U.S. Army Corps of Engineers for flood reduction. In addition to operating a number of recreation facilities, the MWCD cooperates with the Ohio Division of Wildlife for fishing and hunting management.

== Atwood Dam ==
Atwood Village was abandoned and then flooded in the 1930s for the construction of the dam and the resulting formation of Atwood Lake. When water levels are low, foundation stones from former buildings in Atwood Village can be seen, along with evidence of a former rail station and roadbed near Dellroy.

Construction began in 1932. The Atwood Dam is made of rolled earth filled with impervious core; 65 feet (20 m) high, 3,700 feet (1,128 m) long, with a top width of 30 feet (9 m), and a base width of 360 feet (110 m).

=== Spillway ===
Uncontrolled chute spillway near left (south) abutment, crest elevation 941 ft, length of crest 95 ft, design discharge 12,800 cu ft/s (360 m^{3}/s) with surcharge of 12 ft and freeboard of 2 ft.

=== Outlet Works ===
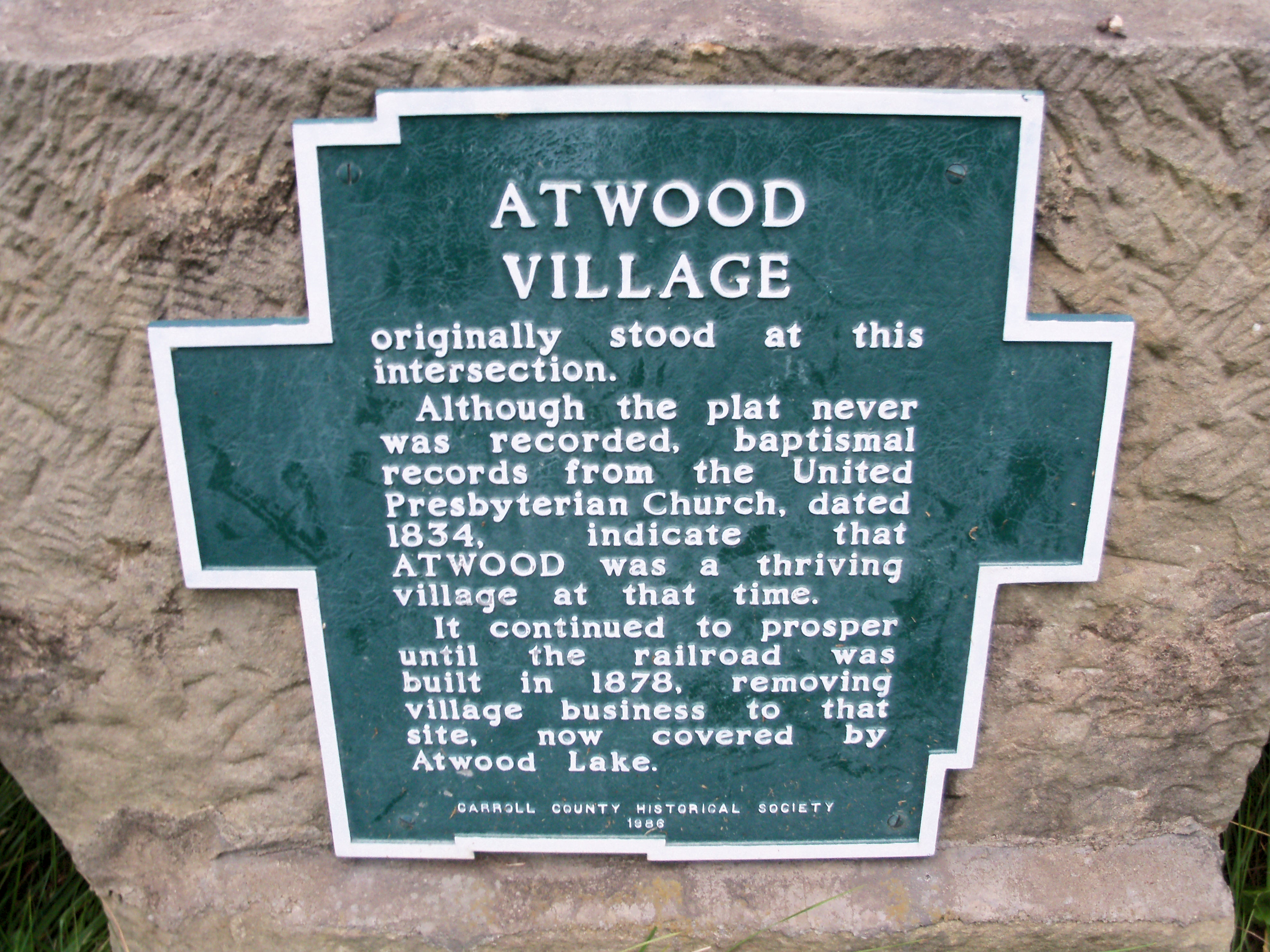
A ghost town the lake was named for

Intake structure: Three 3.5 ft x 7 ft gated conduits through south abutment and a stilling basin. To maintain minimum pool, a 1.5 ft diameter siphon is located in each of the two outer conduits, in front of the gates and discharges into the middle conduit below the gate. Invert elevation siphon 927.25.
Other Structures: None.
Maximum flow of record at the dam site: 3,630 cu ft/s (103 m^{3}/s) (01-22-1959)
Reservoir design flood peak flow: 6,100 cu ft/s (170 m^{3}/s)

The normal pool level of the lake is 928 feet (283 m), at which a 1,540 acres (6 km^{2}) reservoir is formed. During times of excessive rain and snow melt, the corps of engineers can impound more water, up to a maximum possible level of 941 feet (287 m) with 2,460 acres (10.0 km^{2}). The highest pool of record is 935.56 feet (285.16 m) on March 22, 2008. Levels above normal can cause road closures near the lake. In November of each year the lake is lowered to winter pool of 923 feet to allow more flood capacity, and to freeze and kill the roots of aquatic weeds. Levels are returned to summer pool in the spring.

== Recreation ==
Atwood Lake Park has 28 miles (45 km) of shoreline and is a popular event for local festivals and events. There are three public boat launch ramps, and Atwood Lake Marina has locations on the eastern and western shores where boats can be rented. The lake has beaches with access for swimming, rental cabins, hiking trails, concessions, and a campground. A private yacht club, Atwood Yacht Club, is on the south shore of the lake.

Atwood Lake has bluegill, bullheads, channel catfish, crappie, largemouth bass, northern pike, saugeye, and yellow perch.

=== Atwood Lake Resort and Conference Center ===
The Atwood Lake Resort and Conference Center, with nine-hole par-3 and 18-hole championship golf courses, was built in 1965. The MWCD transferred ownership of the property to Carroll County on February 10, 2012. The resort closed in March 2016 due to financial problems.

The course featured an annual "Atwood Cup," a weeklong tournament that awarded a striped jacket to its champion.

The facility was sold to Carroll County businessman Billy Burns in January 2017. Burns announced plans to develop a drug and alcohol treatment center named The Bluffs in the former resort, which opened in September 2017.
