= Leesville, Ohio =

- Village
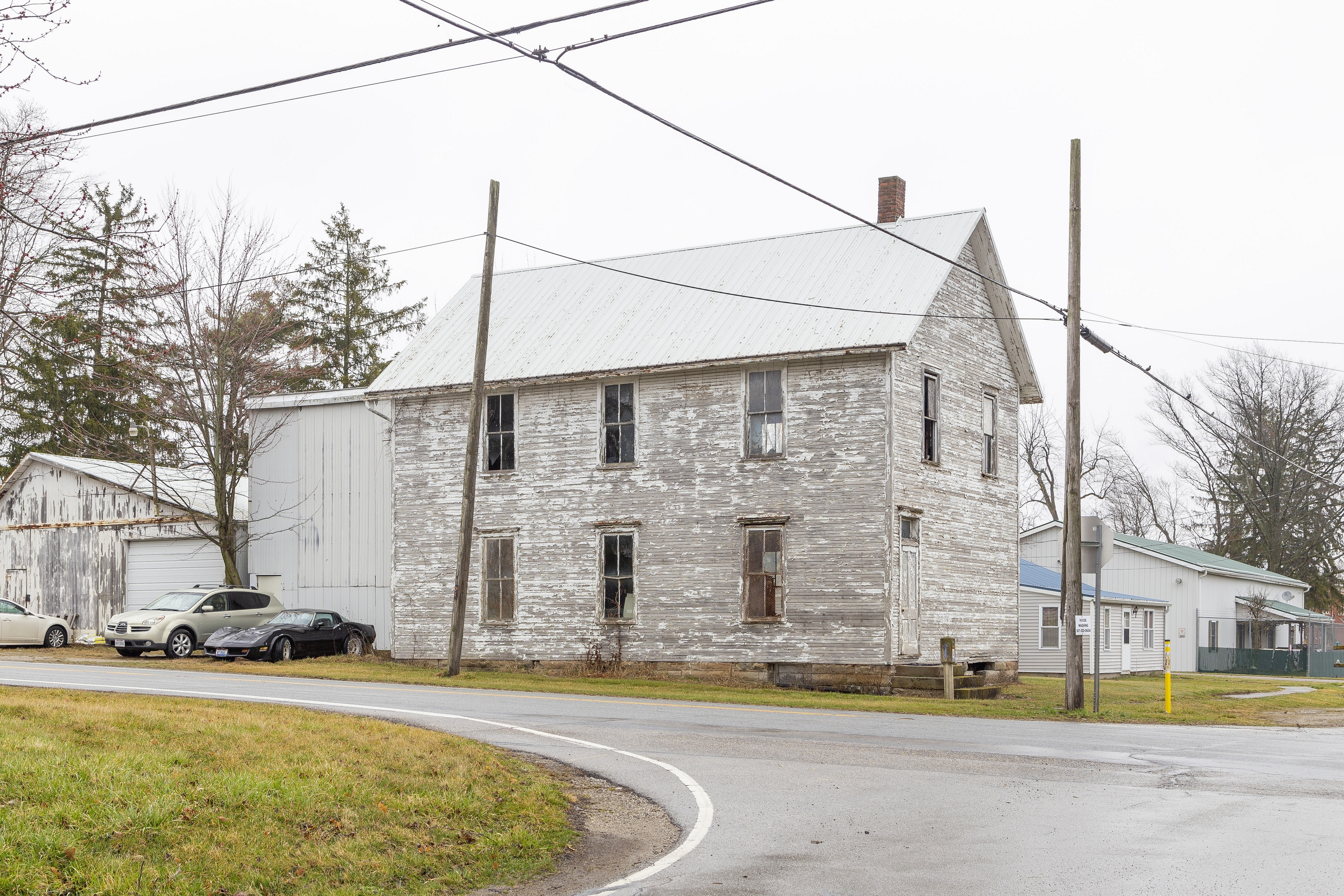
- Village hall

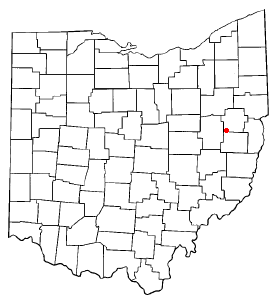
- Location of Leesville, Ohio

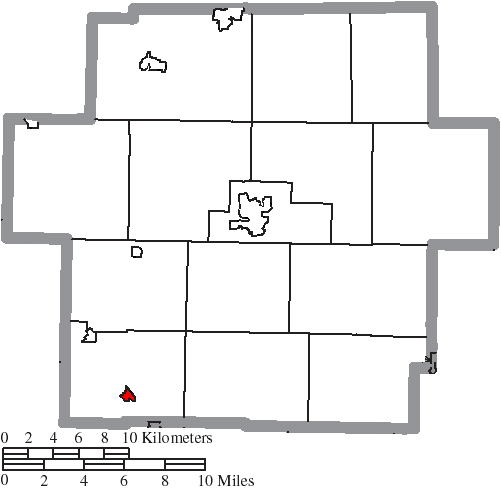
- Location of Leesville in Carroll County
- Coordinates: 40°27′07″N 81°12′34″W
- Country: United States
- State: Ohio
- County: Carroll
- Township: Orange
- Established: 1829

Government
  - Mayor: Mara Malterer

Area
  - Total: 0.25 sq mi (0.66 km^{2})
  - Land: 0.25 sq mi (0.66 km^{2})
  - Water: 0 sq mi (0.00 km^{2})
- Elevation: 965 ft (294 m)

Population (2020)
  - Total: 127
  - Density: 494.6/sq mi (190.98/km^{2})
- Time zone: UTC-5 (Eastern (EST))
  - Summer (DST): UTC-4 (EDT)
- ZIP code: 44639
- Area code: 740
- FIPS code: 39-42518
- GNIS feature ID: 2398412

Leesville is a village in southwestern Carroll County, Ohio, United States. The population was 127 at the 2020 census. It is part of the Canton–Massillon metropolitan area.

== History ==
Leesville was platted August 1, 1812, as Leesburg in what was then One Leg Township, Tuscarawas County, by Thomas Price and Peter Saunders. By the 1820 census it had 131 residents. By 1880, the population was 408, mostly involved in farming and coal mining, and the post office was named Leesville to avoid confusion with a Leesburg in Highland county. At some later point the village name was changed.

Eckley and Perry state of Leesville: "It was one of the stations on the Underground Railroad, and in those days its little public hall at times was visited by such bright and shining abolition lights as William Lloyd Garrison, Frederick Douglass, Wendell Phillips, Parker Pillsbury."

== Geography ==
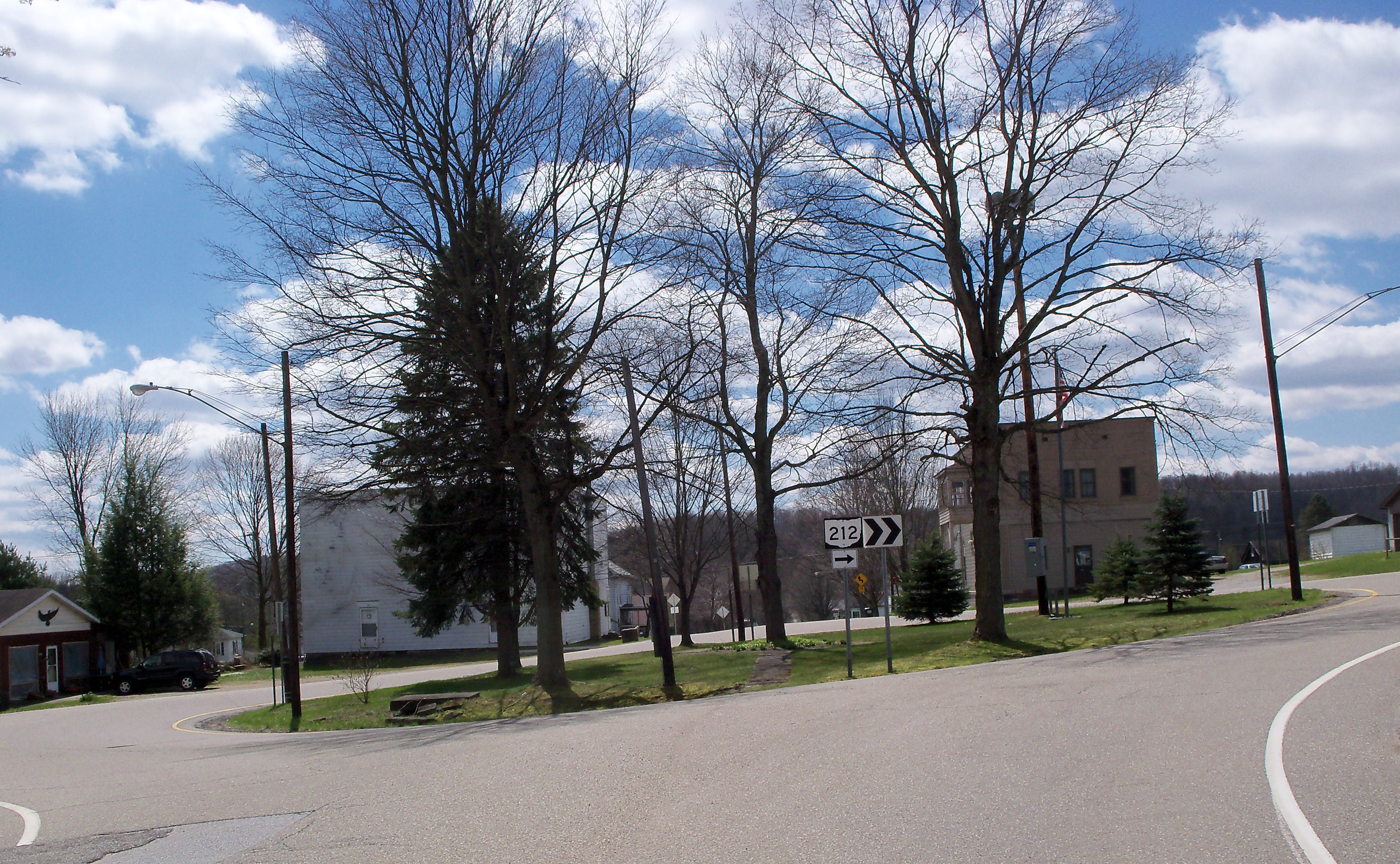
Roundabout in the village

According to the United States Census Bureau, the village has a total area of 0.26 square miles (0.67 km^{2}), all land.

Leesville is on State Route 212 near the terminus of State Route 164.

The Wheeling and Lake Erie Railway previously the New York, Chicago and St. Louis Railroad passes through the town.

== Demographics ==
Historical population
Census	Pop.	Note	%±
1820	131		—
1880	408		—
1890	373		−8.6%
1900	269		−27.9%
1910	194		−27.9%
1920	198		2.1%
1930	196		−1.0%
1940	212		8.2%
1950	297		40.1%
1960	287		−3.4%
1970	221		−23.0%
1980	233		5.4%
1990	156		−33.0%
2000	184		17.9%
2010	158		−14.1%
2020	127		−19.6%

=== 2010 census ===
As of the census of 2010, there were 158 people, 66 households, and 49 families living in the village. The population density was 607.7 inhabitants per square mile (234.6/km^{2}). There were 78 housing units at an average density of 300.0 per square mile (115.8/km^{2}). The racial makeup of the village was 97.5% White and 2.5% from two or more races.

There were 66 households, of which 24.2% had children under the age of 18 living with them, 56.1% were married couples living together, 9.1% had a female householder with no husband present, 9.1% had a male householder with no wife present, and 25.8% were non-families. 19.7% of all households were made up of individuals, and 10.6% had someone living alone who was 65 years of age or older. The average household size was 2.39 and the average family size was 2.61.

The median age in the village was 46.3 years. 19.6% of residents were under the age of 18; 6.3% were between the ages of 18 and 24; 20.9% were from 25 to 44; 27.2% were from 45 to 64; and 25.9% were 65 years of age or older. The gender makeup of the village was 48.1% male and 51.9% female.

=== 2000 census ===
As of the census of 2000, there were 184 people, 71 households, and 52 families living in the village. The population density was 715.9 inhabitants per square mile (276.4/km^{2}). There were 77 housing units at an average density of 299.6 per square mile (115.7/km^{2}). The racial makeup of the village was 99.46% White and 0.54% African American. Hispanic or Latino of any race were 0.54% of the population.

There were 71 households, out of which 31.0% had children under the age of 18 living with them, 62.0% were married couples living together, 9.9% had a female householder with no husband present, and 25.4% were non-families. 23.9% of all households were made up of individuals, and 16.9% had someone living alone who was 65 years of age or older. The average household size was 2.59 and the average family size was 3.08.

In the village, the population was spread out, with 25.5% under the age of 18, 9.2% from 18 to 24, 24.5% from 25 to 44, 26.1% from 45 to 64, and 14.7% who were 65 years of age or older. The median age was 38 years. For every 100 females, there were 93.7 males. For every 100 females age 18 and over, there were 93.0 males.

The median income for a household in the village was $33,750, and the median income for a family was $35,750. Males had a median income of $22,321 versus $16,125 for females. The per capita income for the village was $13,351. None of the families and 0.5% of the population were living below the poverty line.

== Education ==
Public education in the village of Leesville is provided by the Conotton Valley Union Local School District.

== Notable person ==
- Earl Blackburn, Major League Baseball catcher
