= Fairfield Township, Tuscarawas County, Ohio =

Township in Ohio, US

- Township
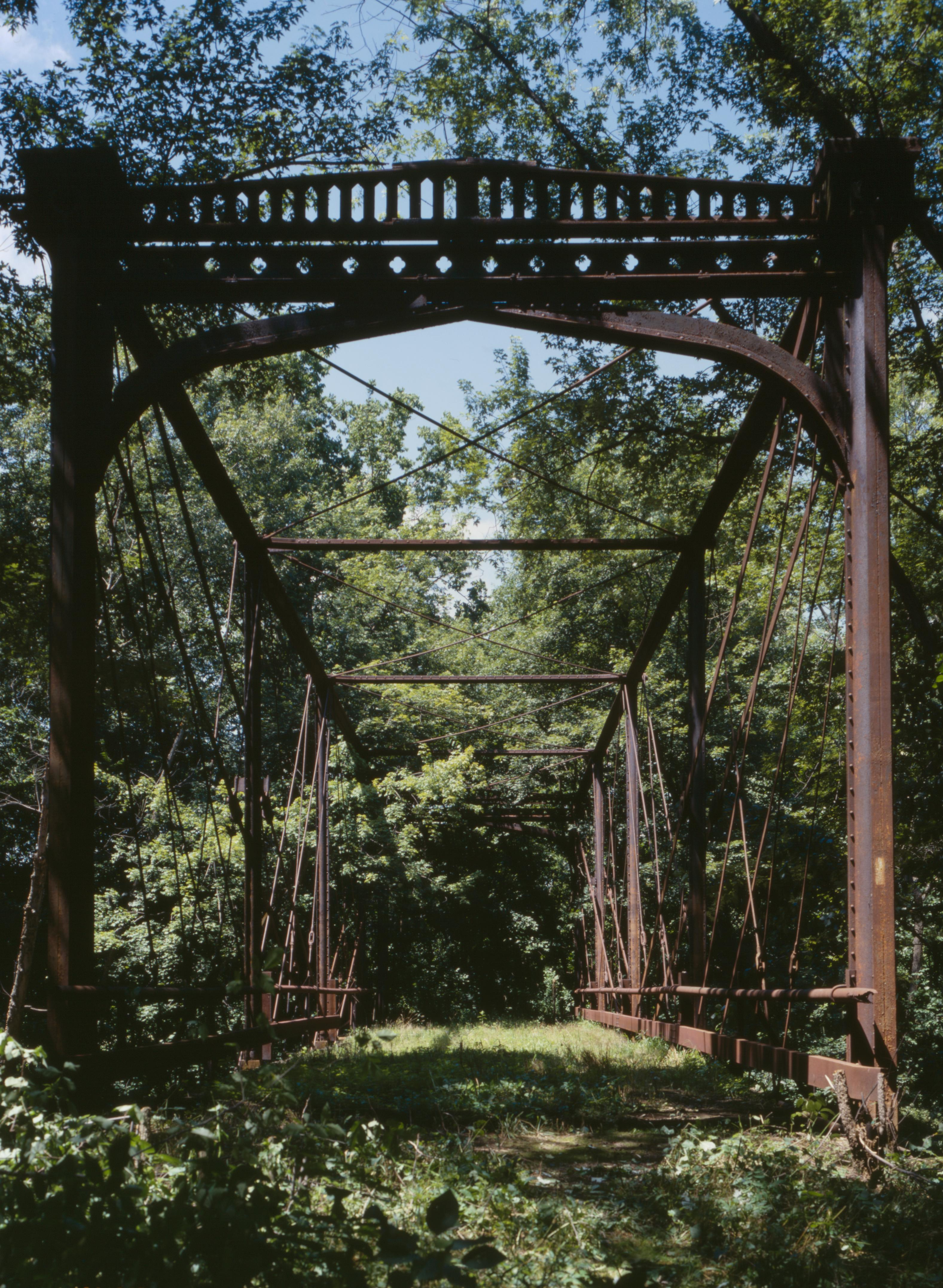
- Zoarville Bridge

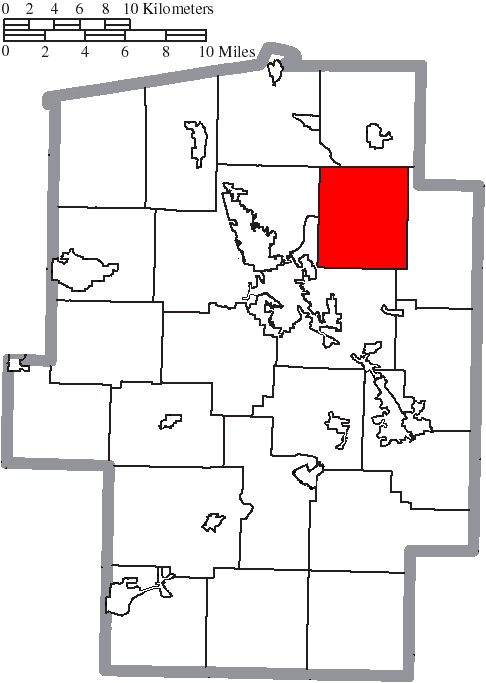
- Location of Fairfield Township in Tuscarawas County
- Coordinates: 40°32′54″N 81°22′55″W
- Country: United States
- State: Ohio
- County: Tuscarawas

Area
  - Total: 22.1 sq mi (57.3 km^{2})
  - Land: 22.0 sq mi (57.1 km^{2})
  - Water: 0.077 sq mi (0.2 km^{2})
- Elevation: 1,080 ft (330 m)

Population (2020)
  - Total: 1,509
  - Density: 68/sq mi (26.4/km^{2})
- Time zone: UTC-5 (Eastern (EST))
  - Summer (DST): UTC-4 (EDT)
- FIPS code: 39-26082
- GNIS feature ID: 1087054

Fairfield Township is one of the twenty-two townships of Tuscarawas County, Ohio, United States. The 2020 census found 1,509 people in the township.

== Geography ==
Located in the northeastern part of the county, it borders the following townships:

- Sandy Township - north
- Warren Township - east
- Goshen Township - south
- Dover Township - west
- Lawrence Township - northwest

No municipalities are located in Fairfield Township, although the unincorporated community of Somerdale lies in the northeastern part of the township.

== Name and history ==
It is one of seven Fairfield Townships statewide.

== Government ==
The township is governed by a three-member board of trustees, who are elected in November of odd-numbered years to a four-year term beginning on the following January 1. Two are elected in the year after the presidential election and one is elected in the year before it. There is also an elected township fiscal officer, who serves a four-year term beginning on April 1 of the year after the election, which is held in November of the year before the presidential election. Vacancies in the fiscal officership or on the board of trustees are filled by the remaining trustees. The current trustees are William Beans, Kenneth Brown, and John Dunn, and the fiscal officer is Jennifer Brown.
