= Bolivar, Ohio =

- Village
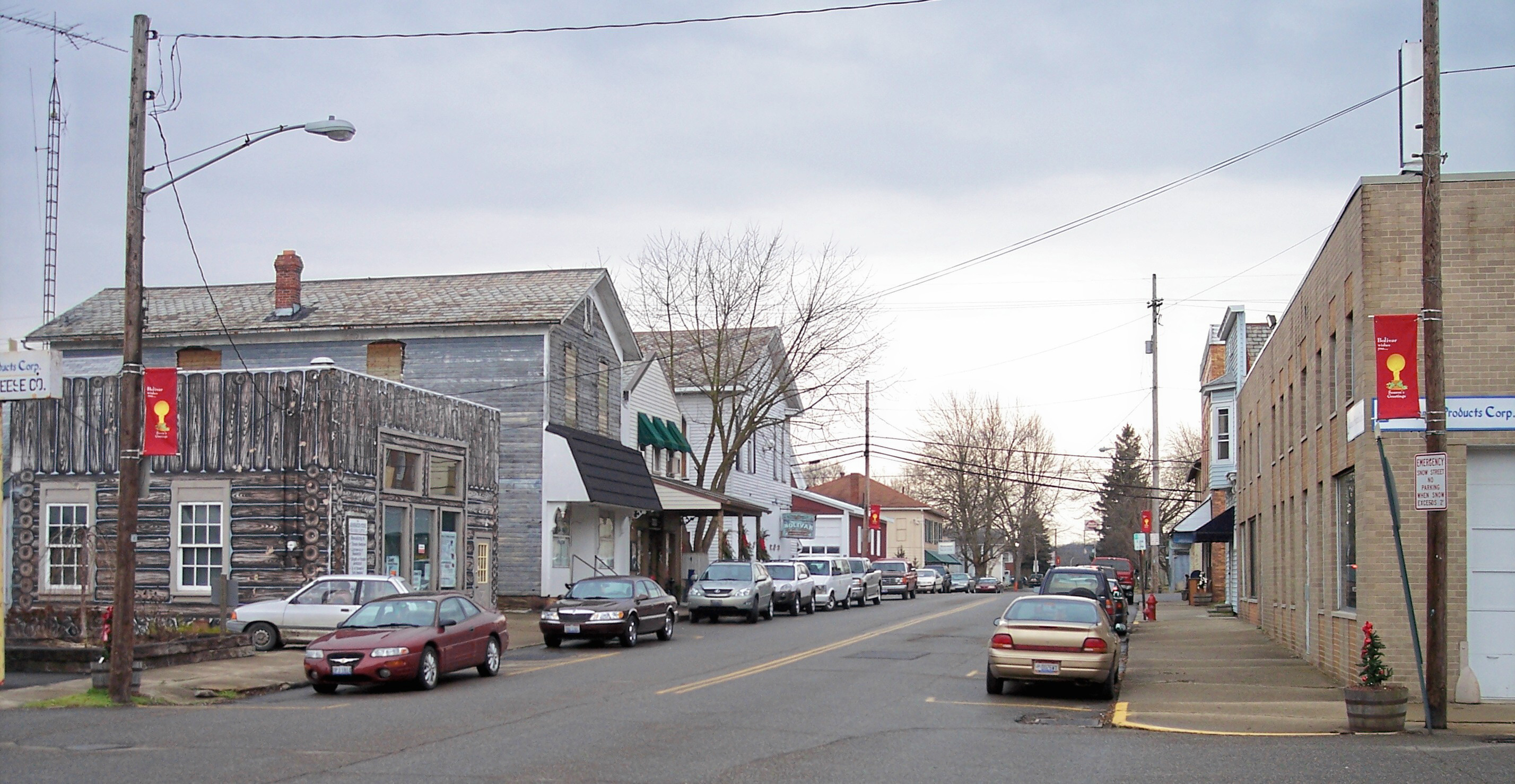
- Canal Street in Bolivar in 2006

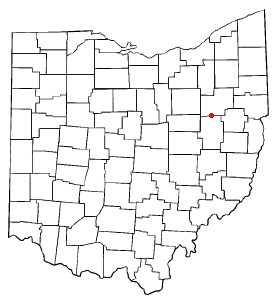
- Location of Bolivar, Ohio

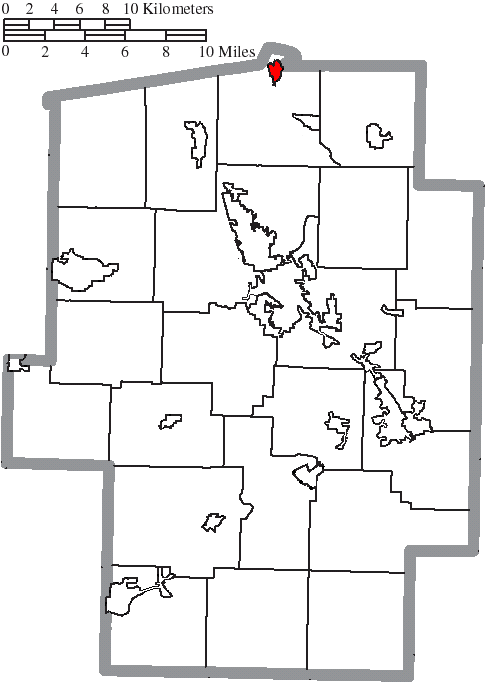
- Location of Bolivar in Tuscarawas County
- Coordinates: 40°39′15″N 81°27′18″W
- Country: United States
- State: Ohio
- County: Tuscarawas
- Township: Lawrence

Area
  - Total: 0.96 sq mi (2.48 km^{2})
  - Land: 0.95 sq mi (2.46 km^{2})
  - Water: 0.0077 sq mi (0.02 km^{2})
- Elevation: 932 ft (284 m)

Population (2020)
  - Total: 1,000
  - Estimate (2023): 965
  - Density: 1,053.2/sq mi (406.66/km^{2})
- Time zone: UTC-5 (Eastern (EST))
  - Summer (DST): UTC-4 (EDT)
- ZIP code: 44612
- Area code: 330
- FIPS code: 39-07594
- GNIS feature ID: 2398148
- Website: https://villageofbolivar.com/

Bolivar (/ˈbɒlɪvər/, rhymes with Oliver) is a village in Tuscarawas County, Ohio, United States. The population was 1,000 at the 2020 census. Bolivar is also home to Fort Laurens, the only American Revolutionary War-era fort in what is now Ohio.

== History ==
Shingas, a Delaware Indian leader, established a village known as Shingas Town in the general vicinity of present Bolivar in 1752. In 1778, Fort Laurens was built in this same area.

Bolivar itself was platted in 1830 as part of the growth occasioned by the development of the Ohio and Erie Canal. The community was named after Simón Bolívar.

== Geography ==
Bolivar is located along the Tuscarawas River.

According to the United States Census Bureau, the village has a total area of 0.70 square miles (1.81 km^{2}), of which 0.69 square miles (1.79 km^{2}) is land and 0.01 square miles (0.03 km^{2}) is water.

Bolivar is the northernmost municipality in Tuscarawas County, and is the only municipality in Tuscarawas County that has areas of Stark County that are farther south than it.

== Demographics ==
Historical population
Census	Pop.	Note	%±
1840	309		—
1850	302		−2.3%
1860	372		23.2%
1870	413		11.0%
1880	564		36.6%
1890	675		19.7%
1910	567		—
1920	519		−8.5%
1930	506		−2.5%
1940	596		17.8%
1950	776		30.2%
1960	932		20.1%
1970	1,084		16.3%
1980	989		−8.8%
1990	914		−7.6%
2000	894		−2.2%
2010	994		11.2%
2020	1,000		0.6%
2023 (est.)	965	▼	−3.5%
U.S. Decennial Census

=== 2010 census ===
As of the census of 2010, there were 994 people, 380 households, and 257 families living in the village. The population density was 1,440.6 inhabitants per square mile (556.2/km^{2}). There were 396 housing units at an average density of 573.9 per square mile (221.6/km^{2}). The racial makeup of the village was 98.8% White, 0.1% African American, 0.4% Native American, 0.2% Asian, and 0.5% from two or more races. Hispanic or Latino of any race were 0.7% of the population.

There were 380 households, of which 29.7% had children under the age of 18 living with them, 51.8% were married couples living together, 10.5% had a female householder with no husband present, 5.3% had a male householder with no wife present, and 32.4% were non-families. 28.4% of all households were made up of individuals, and 11.5% had someone living alone who was 65 years of age or older. The average household size was 2.37 and the average family size was 2.86.

The median age in the village was 45.9 years. 21% of residents were under the age of 18; 5.2% were between the ages of 18 and 24; 22.1% were from 25 to 44; 29.9% were from 45 to 64; and 21.4% were 65 years of age or older. The gender makeup of the village was 46.9% male and 53.1% female.

=== 2000 census ===
As of the census of 2000, there were 894 people, 375 households, and 265 families living in the village. The population density was 1,769.8 inhabitants per square mile (683.3/km^{2}). There were 391 housing units at an average density of 774.0 per square mile (298.8/km^{2}). The racial makeup of the village was 98.77% White, 0.56% Asian, 0.11% from other races, and 0.56% from two or more races. Hispanic or Latino of any race were 0.22% of the population.

There were 375 households, out of which 28.5% had children under the age of 18 living with them, 60.3% were married couples living together, 8.5% had a female householder with no husband present, and 29.3% were non-families. 26.9% of all households were made up of individuals, and 15.5% had someone living alone who was 65 years of age or older. The average household size was 2.38 and the average family size was 2.89.

In the village, the population was spread out, with 23.9% under the age of 18, 6.9% from 18 to 24, 26.7% from 25 to 44, 26.1% from 45 to 64, and 16.3% who were 65 years of age or older. The median age was 40 years. For every 100 females there were 94.8 males. For every 100 females age 18 and over, there were 89.9 males.

The median income for a household in the village was $38,971, and the median income for a family was $46,250. Males had a median income of $39,904 versus $19,844 for females. The per capita income for the village was $17,651. About 1.5% of families and 3.9% of the population were below the poverty line, including none of those under age 18 and 10.4% of those age 65 or over.

== Education ==
Bolivar is served by a branch of the Tuscarawas County Public Library.
