= Orange Township, Carroll County, Ohio =

Township in Ohio, US

- Township
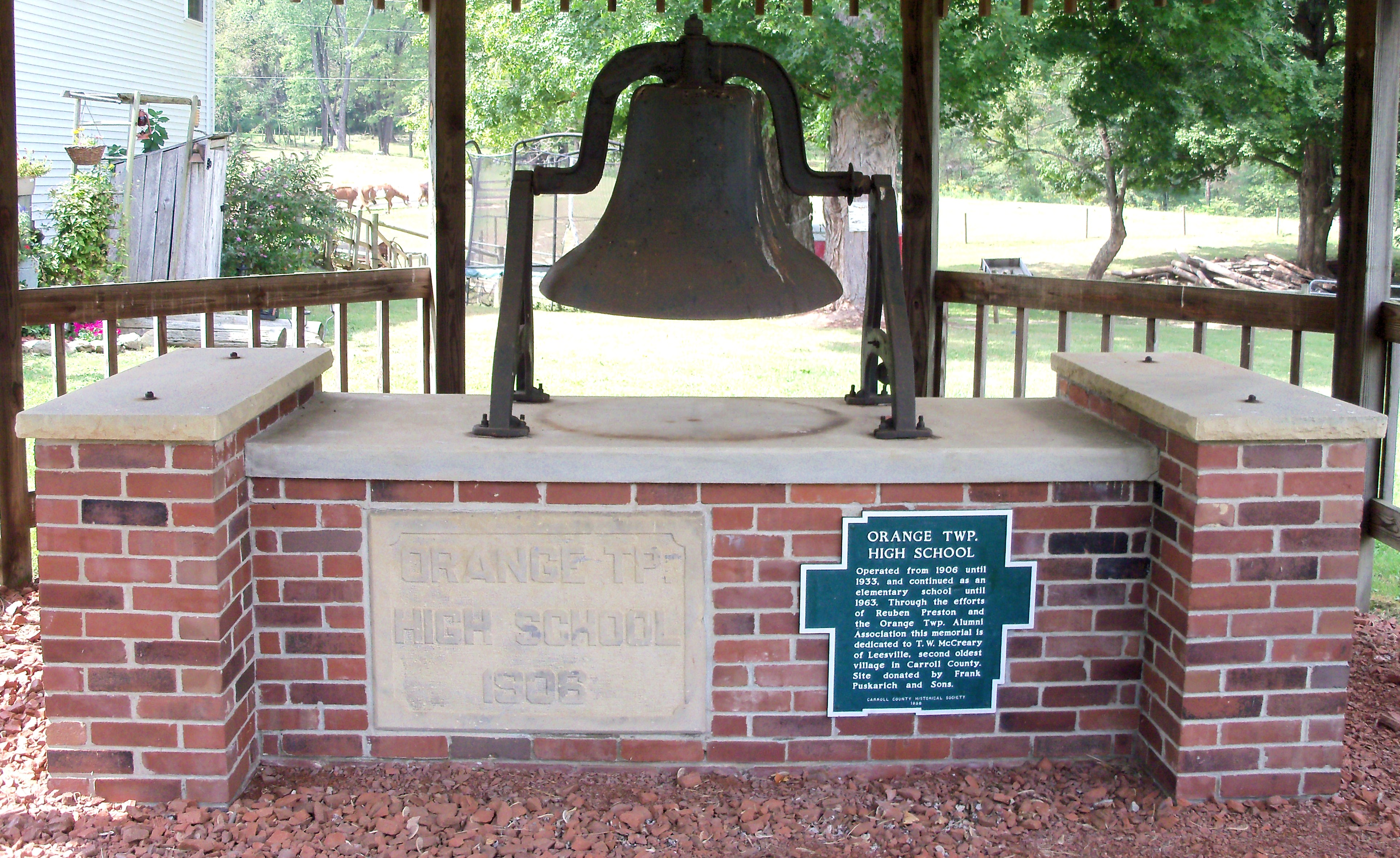
- The old high school bell

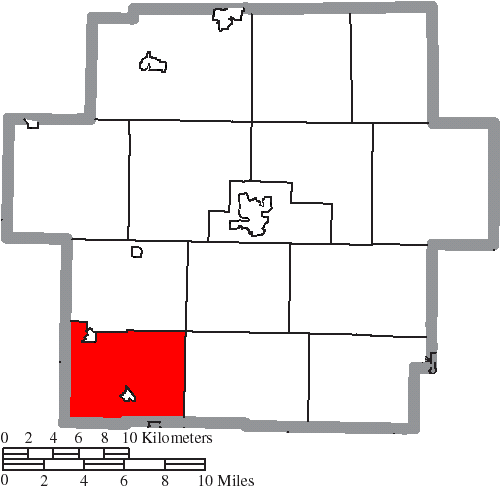
- Location of Orange Township in Carroll County
- Coordinates: 40°28′29″N 81°13′9″W
- Country: United States
- State: Ohio
- County: Carroll

Area
  - Total: 27.3 sq mi (70.7 km^{2})
  - Land: 26.2 sq mi (67.9 km^{2})
  - Water: 1.1 sq mi (2.8 km^{2})
- Elevation: 928 ft (283 m)

Population (2020)
  - Total: 1,133
  - Density: 43/sq mi (16.7/km^{2})
- Time zone: UTC-5 (Eastern (EST))
  - Summer (DST): UTC-4 (EDT)
- FIPS code: 39-58576
- GNIS feature ID: 1085833

Orange Township is one of the fourteen townships of Carroll County, Ohio, United States. As of the 2020 census, the population was 1,133, 808 of whom lived in unincorporated portions of the township.

== Geography ==
Located in the southwestern corner of the county, it borders the following townships:

- Monroe Township - north
- Union Township - northeast corner
- Perry Township - east
- Monroe Township, Harrison County - south
- Union Township, Tuscarawas County - southwest
- Warren Township, Tuscarawas County - northwest

Two incorporated villages are located in Orange Township: Leesville in the south, and part of Sherrodsville in the northwest.

The Conotton Creek flows through the township.

== Name and history ==
It is one of six Orange Townships statewide.

Part of Orange Township was originally under the name of One-leg Township, Tuscarawas County (founded March 29, 1809, dissolved with formation of Carroll County). One Leg was an early name for Conotton Creek, named after a one-legged Indian who lived along its banks. The township has part of the original surveyed townships 13 and 14, in range 6 and parts of townships 14 and 15 of range 7 of the Old Seven Ranges.

== Government ==
Historical population
Census	Pop.	Note	%±
1840	1,528		—
1850	1,577		3.2%
1860	1,284		−18.6%
1870	1,207		−6.0%
1880	1,327		9.9%
1890	2,705		103.8%
1900	2,200		−18.7%
1910	1,692		−23.1%
1920	1,098		−35.1%
1930	994		−9.5%
1940	956		−3.8%
1950	1,134		18.6%
1960	1,238		9.2%
1970	1,075		−13.2%
1980	1,171		8.9%
1990	1,123		−4.1%
2000	1,258		12.0%
2010	1,339		6.4%
2020	1,133		−15.4%

The township is governed by a three-member board of trustees, who are elected in November of odd-numbered years to a four-year term beginning on the following January 1. Two are elected in the year after the presidential election and one is elected in the year before it. There is also an elected township fiscal officer, who serves a four-year term beginning on April 1 of the year after the election, which is held in November of the year before the presidential election. Vacancies in the fiscal officership or on the board of trustees are filled by the remaining trustees.

== Education ==
Students attend the Conotton Valley Union Local School District.

Beginning in 1837 through most of the 19th century, the New Hagerstown Academy was at the place in the township of the same name.
