= Dellroy, Ohio =

- Village
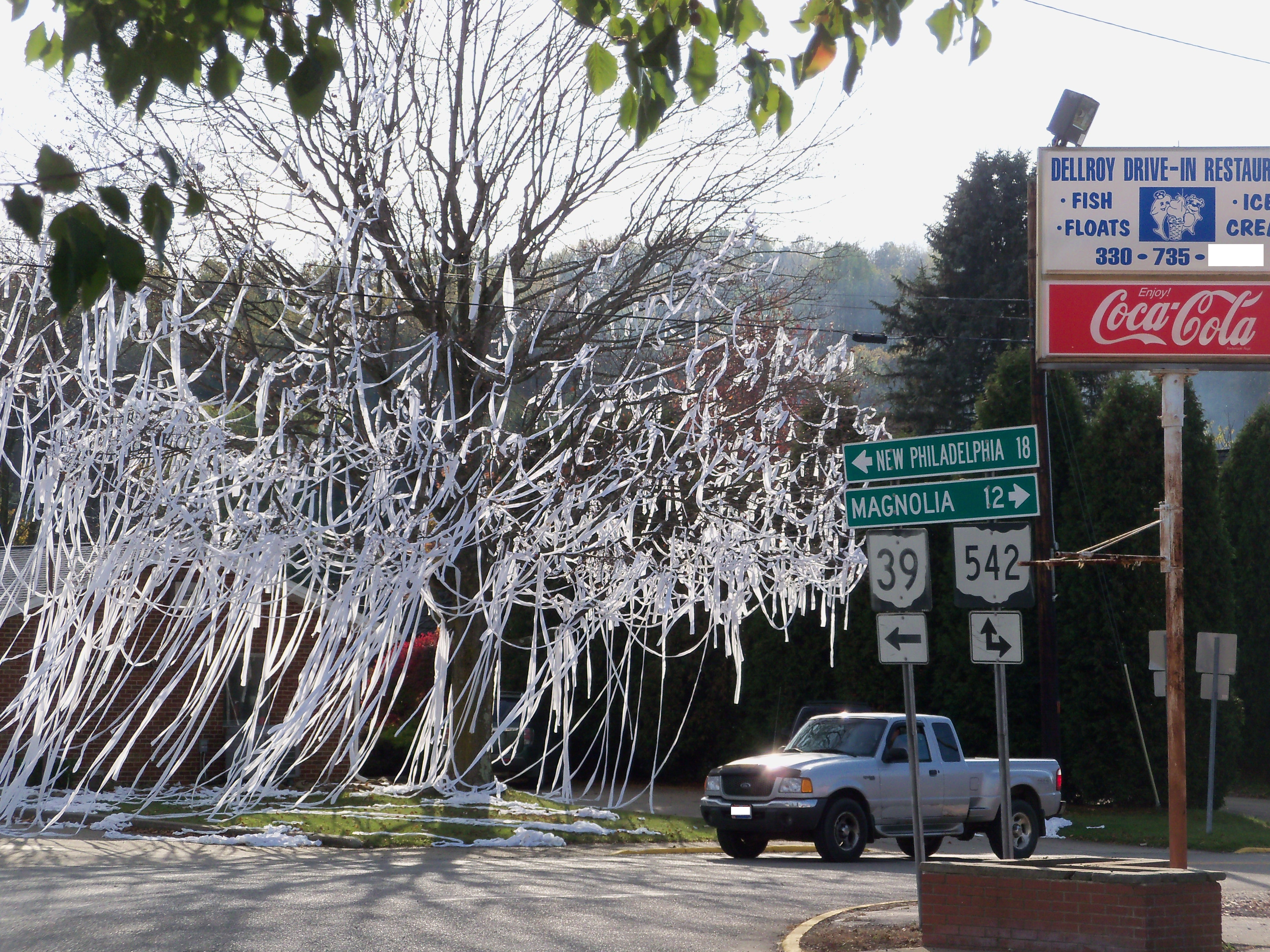
- Dellroy is decorated each Halloween.

- Logo
- Motto: "Small Town Paradise"
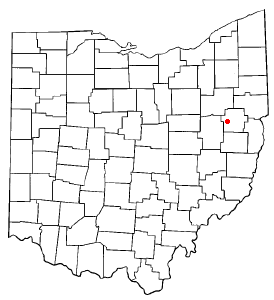
- Location of Dellroy, Ohio

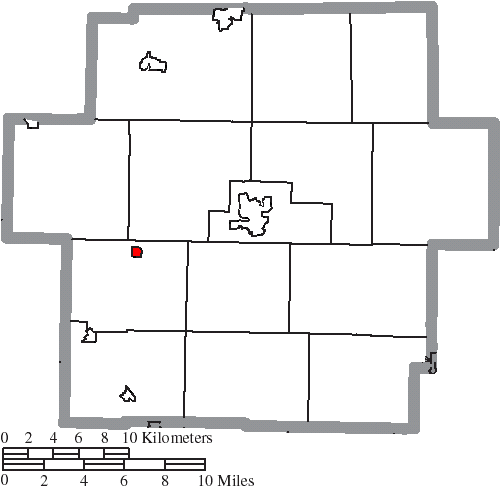
- Location of Dellroy in Carroll County
- Coordinates: 40°33′18″N 81°11′57″W
- Country: United States
- State: Ohio
- County: Carroll
- Township: Monroe

Government
  - Mayor: Amy Harkless

Area
  - Total: 0.21 sq mi (0.55 km^{2})
  - Land: 0.18 sq mi (0.47 km^{2})
  - Water: 0.031 sq mi (0.08 km^{2})
- Elevation: 955 ft (291 m)

Population (2020)
  - Total: 268
  - Estimate (2023): 265
  - Density: 1,490.6/sq mi (575.52/km^{2})
- Time zone: UTC-5 (Eastern (EST))
  - Summer (DST): UTC-4 (Eastern (EDT))
- ZIP code: 44620
- Area code: 330
- FIPS code: 39-21560
- GNIS feature ID: 2398709
- Website: villageofdellroy.org

Dellroy is a village in western Carroll County, Ohio, United States. The population was 268 at the 2020 census. It is part of the Canton–Massillon metropolitan area.

== History ==
The village was established in 1849 as "Cannonsburg." It was renamed circa 1878 to Dellroy. The origin of the name "Dellroy" is disputed.

== Geography ==
According to the United States Census Bureau, the village has a total area of 0.21 square miles (0.54 km^{2}), of which 0.18 square miles (0.47 km^{2}) is land and 0.03 square miles (0.08 km^{2}) is water.

Dellroy lies at the junction of Ohio State Routes 39 and 542.

== Demographics ==
Historical population
Census	Pop.	Note	%±
1880	664		—
1890	511		−23.0%
1900	400		−21.7%
1910	373		−6.7%
1920	338		−9.4%
1930	342		1.2%
1940	335		−2.0%
1950	358		6.9%
1960	391		9.2%
1970	363		−7.2%
1980	368		1.4%
1990	314		−14.7%
2000	294		−6.4%
2010	356		21.1%
2020	268		−24.7%
2023 (est.)	265	▼	−1.1%

=== 2010 census ===
As of the census of 2010, there were 356 people, 134 households, and 94 families living in the village. The population density was 1,977.8 inhabitants per square mile (763.6/km^{2}). There were 148 housing units at an average density of 822.2 per square mile (317.5/km^{2}). The racial makeup of the village was 97.2% White, 0.6% African American, 1.4% Native American, and 0.8% from two or more races. Hispanic or Latino of any race were 0.6% of the population.

There were 134 households, of which 33.6% had children under the age of 18 living with them, 54.5% were married couples living together, 11.2% had a female householder with no husband present, 4.5% had a male householder with no wife present, and 29.9% were non-families. 20.9% of all households were made up of individuals, and 9.7% had someone living alone who was 65 years of age or older. The average household size was 2.66 and the average family size was 3.05.

The median age in the village was 38 years. 25.6% of residents were under the age of 18; 5.9% were between the ages of 18 and 24; 26.9% were from 25 to 44; 24.4% were from 45 to 64; and 17.1% were 65 years of age or older. The gender makeup of the village was 48.6% male and 51.4% female.

=== 2000 census ===
As of the census of 2000, there were 294 people, 121 households, and 83 families living in the village. The population density was 1,714.8 inhabitants per square mile (662.1/km^{2}). There were 130 housing units at an average density of 758.2 per square mile (292.7/km^{2}). The racial makeup of the village was 99.32% White, 0.34% Native American and 0.34% Pacific Islander.

There were 121 households, out of which 32.2% had children under the age of 18 living with them, 56.2% were married couples living together, 10.7% had a female householder with no husband present, and 30.6% were non-families. 28.9% of all households were made up of individuals, and 12.4% had someone living alone who was 65 years of age or older. The average household size was 2.43 and the average family size was 3.00.

In the village, the population was spread out, with 26.2% under the age of 18, 7.1% from 18 to 24, 29.6% from 25 to 44, 19.0% from 45 to 64, and 18.0% who were 65 years of age or older. The median age was 38 years. For every 100 females there were 90.9 males. For every 100 females age 18 and over, there were 90.4 males.

The median income for a household in the village was $27,344, and the median income for a family was $31,875. Males had a median income of $27,292 versus $20,833 for females. The per capita income for the village was $15,149. About 8.8% of families and 9.1% of the population were below the poverty line, including 7.4% of those under the age of eighteen and 3.6% of those 65 or over.

== Education ==
Students attend the Carrollton Exempted Village School District.

== Notable people ==
- Vince Costello - former American football linebacker
- Mariah O'Brien - cover girl on Alice In Chains Album Dirt
