= Monroe Township, Carroll County, Ohio =

Township in Ohio, US

- Township
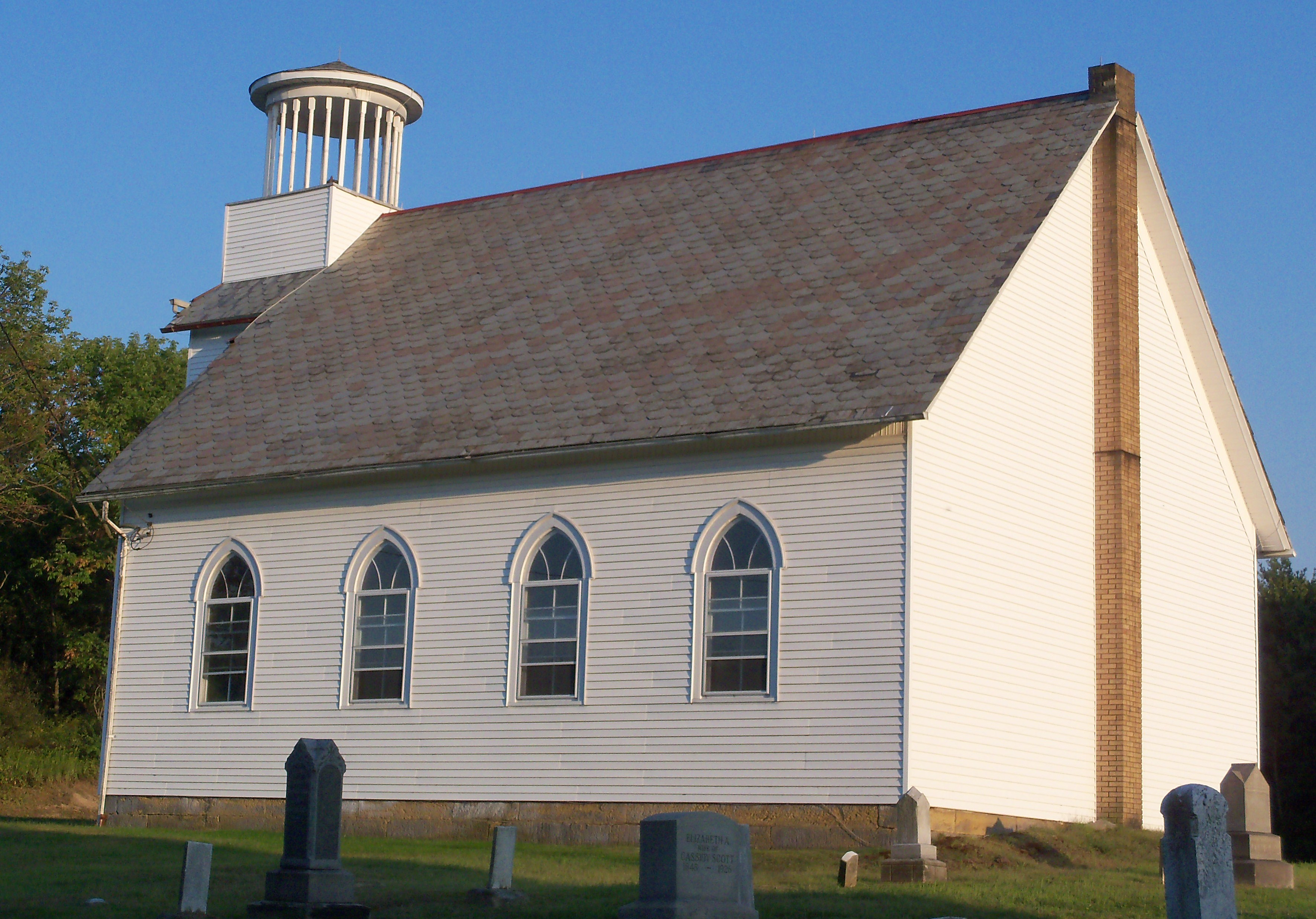
- Leavittsville Methodist Church and graveyard

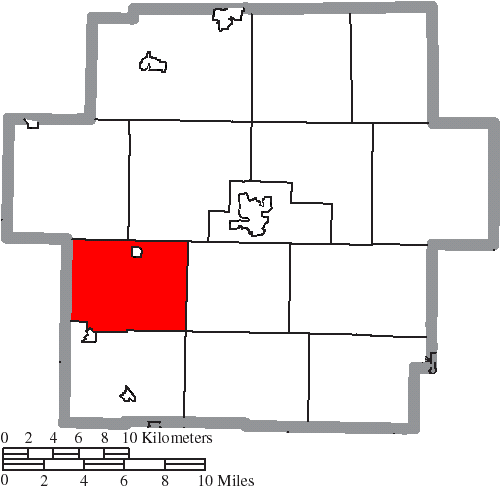
- Location of Monroe Township in Carroll County
- Coordinates: 40°32′21″N 81°12′25″W
- Country: United States
- State: Ohio
- County: Carroll

Area
  - Total: 26.4 sq mi (68.5 km^{2})
  - Land: 24.5 sq mi (63.5 km^{2})
  - Water: 1.9 sq mi (5.0 km^{2})
- Elevation: 1,070 ft (326 m)

Population (2020)
  - Total: 1,924
  - Density: 78/sq mi (30.3/km^{2})
- Time zone: UTC-5 (Eastern (EST))
  - Summer (DST): UTC-4 (EDT)
- FIPS code: 39-51324
- GNIS feature ID: 1085832

Monroe Township is one of the fourteen townships of Carroll County, Ohio, United States. As of the 2020 census, the population was 1,924, 1,632 of whom lived in the unincorporated portions of the township.

== Geography ==
Located in the southwestern part of the county, it borders the following townships:

- Harrison Township - northeast
- Union Township - east
- Perry Township - southeast corner
- Orange Township - south
- Warren Township, Tuscarawas County - west
- Rose Township - northwest

Two incorporated villages are located in Monroe Township: Dellroy in the north, and part of Sherrodsville in the southwest.

Atwood Lake lies in the northern part of the township and the Conotton Creek flows through the southwest corner.

== Name and history ==
It is one of twenty-two Monroe Townships statewide.

Monroe Township was established at the first session of the county commissioner's board, after the organization of the county in 1833. It contains twelve full sections and three half sections taken from the original township 14, range 6 of the Old Seven Ranges, contributed from Harrison County; also twelve full sections and two half sections from original township 15, range 7, as contributed from Tuscarawas County at the time Carroll County was erected by contributions from surrounding counties. It was named for James Monroe, President of the United States.

== Government ==
Historical population
Census	Pop.	Note	%±
1840	1,060		—
1850	1,117		5.4%
1860	1,241		11.1%
1870	931		−25.0%
1880	1,283		37.8%
1890	1,487		15.9%
1900	1,336		−10.2%
1910	1,128		−15.6%
1920	974		−13.7%
1930	964		−1.0%
1940	983		2.0%
1950	1,078		9.7%
1960	1,145		6.2%
1970	1,446		26.3%
1980	1,633		12.9%
1990	1,755		7.5%
2000	1,930		10.0%
2010	2,072		7.4%
2020	1,924		−7.1%

The township is governed by a three-member board of trustees, who are elected in November of odd-numbered years to a four-year term beginning on the following January 1. Two are elected in the year after the presidential election and one is elected in the year before it. There is also an elected township fiscal officer, who serves a four-year term beginning on April 1 of the year after the election, which is held in November of the year before the presidential election. Vacancies in the fiscal officership or on the board of trustees are filled by the remaining trustees.

== Education ==
Students near Sherrodsville and Leavittsville attend the Conotton Valley Union Local School District. Those nearer to Dellroy attend the Carrollton Exempted Village School District.
