= Flood Control Act of 1939 =

United States federal law

Flood Control Act of 1939 (FCA 1939) Pub. L. 76–396 (ch. 699, 53 Stat. 1414), enacted on August 11, 1939, by the 76th Congress, authorized construction of flood control projects across the United States. The Act authorized the transfer of ownership of local and state dams to the United States Army Corps of Engineers. The Act was also instrumental in establishing the Federal policy of cost-benefit analysis, the standard by which the government determines whether or not a project provides sufficient benefits to justify the cost of expending public funds. It specified the standard that "the benefits to whomever they accrue [be] in excess of the estimated costs.

== See also ==
Other flood control provisions enacted in 1939 can be found under:

- the Omnibus Flood Control Act, which authorized 35 preliminary flood control surveys; declared the Alamorga Dam and Reservoir on the Pecos River, New Mexico, authorized for the purpose of controlling floods; and in other ways promoted the project of flood control.
- the State-Justice-Commerce Appropriation Act (approved June 29), which authorized projects on the Rio Grande.
- the Military Appropriation Act (approved April 26), which granted $305,188,584 for the civil functions of the War Department. The largest items here were $133,000,000 for general flood control work; $96,000,000 for the preservation and maintenance of existing river and harbor works; $39,000,000 for flood control along the Mississippi River and its tributaries and $24,774,924 for the Panama Canal and the Canal Zone.
