= Sherrodsville, Ohio =

- Village
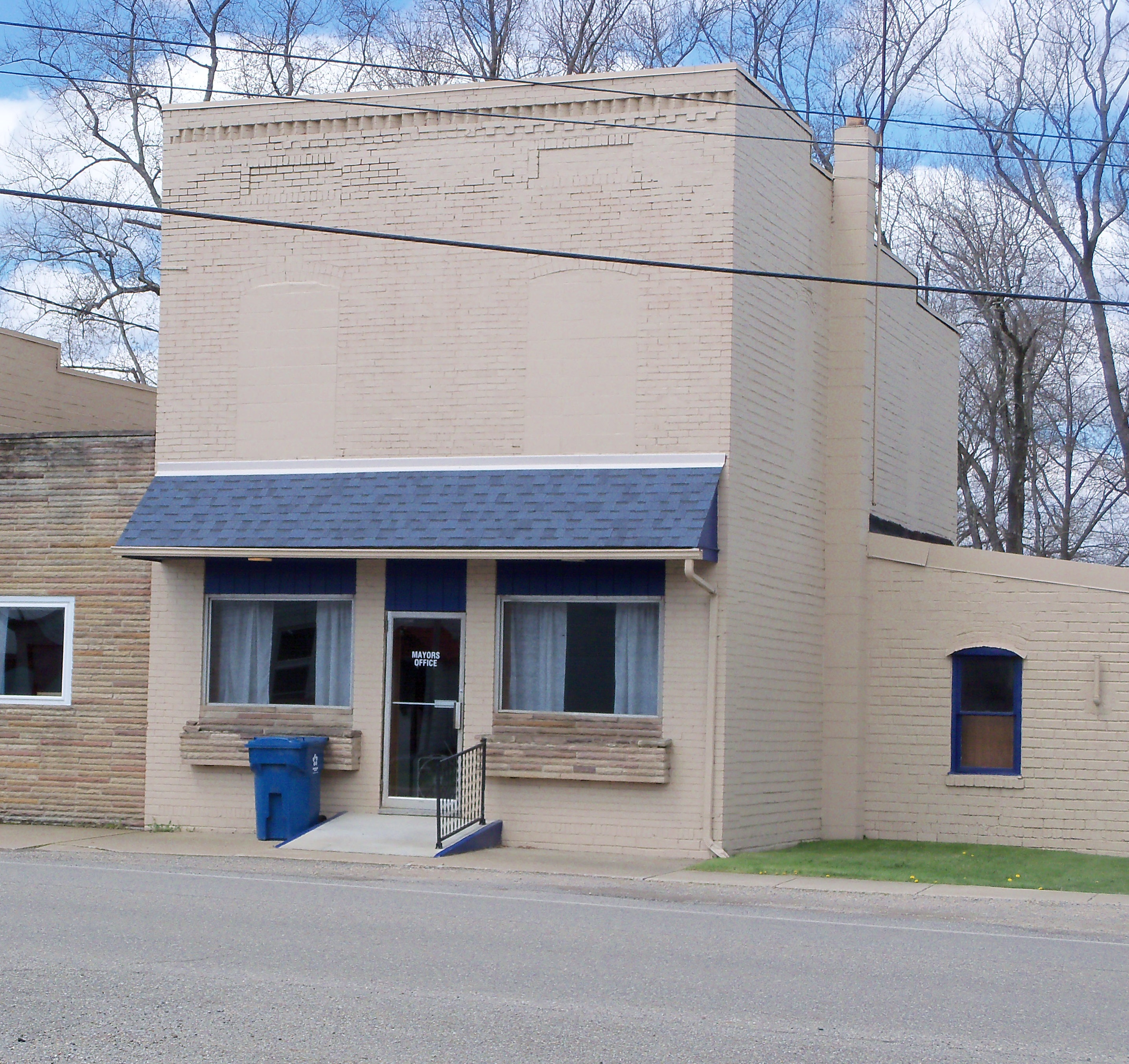
- Village hall

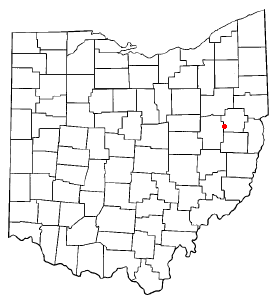
- Location of Sherrodsville, Ohio

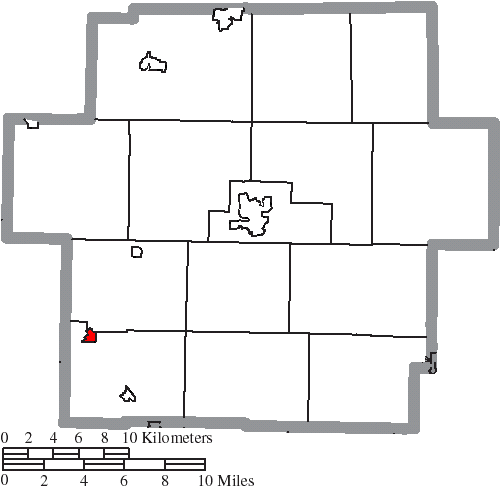
- Location of Sherrodsville in Carroll County
- Coordinates: 40°29′42″N 81°14′45″W
- Country: United States
- State: Ohio
- County: Carroll
- Townships: Orange, Monroe
- Platted: 1882
- Named for: Charles Sherrod

Area
  - Total: 0.32 sq mi (0.82 km^{2})
  - Land: 0.32 sq mi (0.82 km^{2})
  - Water: 0 sq mi (0.00 km^{2})
- Elevation: 906 ft (276 m)

Population (2020)
  - Total: 222
  - Density: 703.5/sq mi (271.62/km^{2})
- Time zone: UTC-5 (Eastern (EST))
  - Summer (DST): UTC-4 (EDT)
- ZIP code: 44675
- Area code: 740
- FIPS code: 39-72242
- GNIS feature ID: 2399804
- Website: Village of Sherrodsville

Sherrodsville (/ˈʃɛrɒdzvɪl/ SHERR-odz-vil) is a village in southwestern Carroll County, Ohio, United States. The population was 222 at the 2020 census. It is part of the Canton–Massillon metropolitan area.

== History ==
Sherrodsville was laid out in 1882, and named after Charles Sherrod, the original owner of the town site. In 1911 a devastating fire happened in the town causing 23 buildings to be burnt.

== Geography ==
Sherrodsville is located on Conotton Creek.

According to the United States Census Bureau, the village has a total area of 0.32 square miles (0.83 km^{2}), all land.

Sherrodsville is at the intersection of State Routes 39 and 212.

The Wheeling and Lake Erie Railway previously the New York, Chicago and St. Louis Railroad passes through Sherrodsville.

== Demographics ==
Historical population
Census	Pop.	Note	%±
1890	893		—
1900	926		3.7%
1910	721		−22.1%
1920	377		−47.7%
1930	361		−4.2%
1940	333		−7.8%
1950	426		27.9%
1960	480		12.7%
1970	400		−16.7%
1980	396		−1.0%
1990	284		−28.3%
2000	316		11.3%
2010	304		−3.8%
2020	222		−27.0%

=== 2010 census ===
As of the census of 2010, there were 304 people, 113 households, and 84 families living in the village. The population density was 950.0 inhabitants per square mile (366.8/km^{2}). There were 122 housing units at an average density of 381.3 per square mile (147.2/km^{2}). The racial makeup of the village was 98.4% White, 1.0% Native American, 0.3% from other races, and 0.3% from two or more races. Hispanic or Latino of any race were 0.3% of the population.

There were 113 households, of which 35.4% had children under the age of 18 living with them, 51.3% were married couples living together, 11.5% had a female householder with no husband present, 11.5% had a male householder with no wife present, and 25.7% were non-families. 23.0% of all households were made up of individuals, and 8.9% had someone living alone who was 65 years of age or older. The average household size was 2.69 and the average family size was 3.05.

The median age in the village was 36.5 years. 26.6% of residents were under the age of 18; 8.3% were between the ages of 18 and 24; 23.8% were from 25 to 44; 30.5% were from 45 to 64; and 10.9% were 65 years of age or older. The gender makeup of the village was 52.0% male and 48.0% female.

=== 2000 census ===
As of the census of 2000, there were 316 people, 122 households, and 90 families living in the village. The population density was 999.7 inhabitants per square mile (386.0/km^{2}). There were 129 housing units at an average density of 408.1 per square mile (157.6/km^{2}). The racial makeup of the village was 97.15% White, 0.32% African American, 0.32% Asian, 0.32% from other races, and 1.90% from two or more races. 0.32% of the population were Hispanic or Latino of any race.

There were 122 households, out of which 28.7% had children under the age of 18 living with them, 54.9% were married couples living together, 14.8% had a female householder with no husband present, and 26.2% were non-families. 23.8% of all households were made up of individuals, and 10.7% had someone living alone who was 65 years of age or older. The average household size was 2.59 and the average family size was 3.03.

In the village, the population was spread out, with 26.3% under the age of 18, 9.8% from 18 to 24, 28.2% from 25 to 44, 21.2% from 45 to 64, and 14.6% who were 65 years of age or older. The median age was 39 years. For every 100 females there were 89.2 males. For every 100 females age 18 and over, there were 84.9 males.

The median income for a household in the village was $28,036, and the median income for a family was $31,786. Males had a median income of $27,014 versus $17,813 for females. The per capita income for the village was $12,896. 19.1% of the population and 15.1% of families were below the poverty line. Out of the total population, 33.3% of those under the age of 18 and 15.0% of those 65 and older were living below the poverty line.

== Education ==
Public education in the village of Sherrodsville is provided by the Conotton Valley Union Local School District. Campuses serving the village include Sherrodsville Elementary School (Grades K-6) and Conotton Valley High School (Grades 7-12).

== Notable people ==
Edmund Rowe, United States Representative from 1943 to 1945.
