= Seven Ranges Terminus =

- U.S. National Register of Historic Places
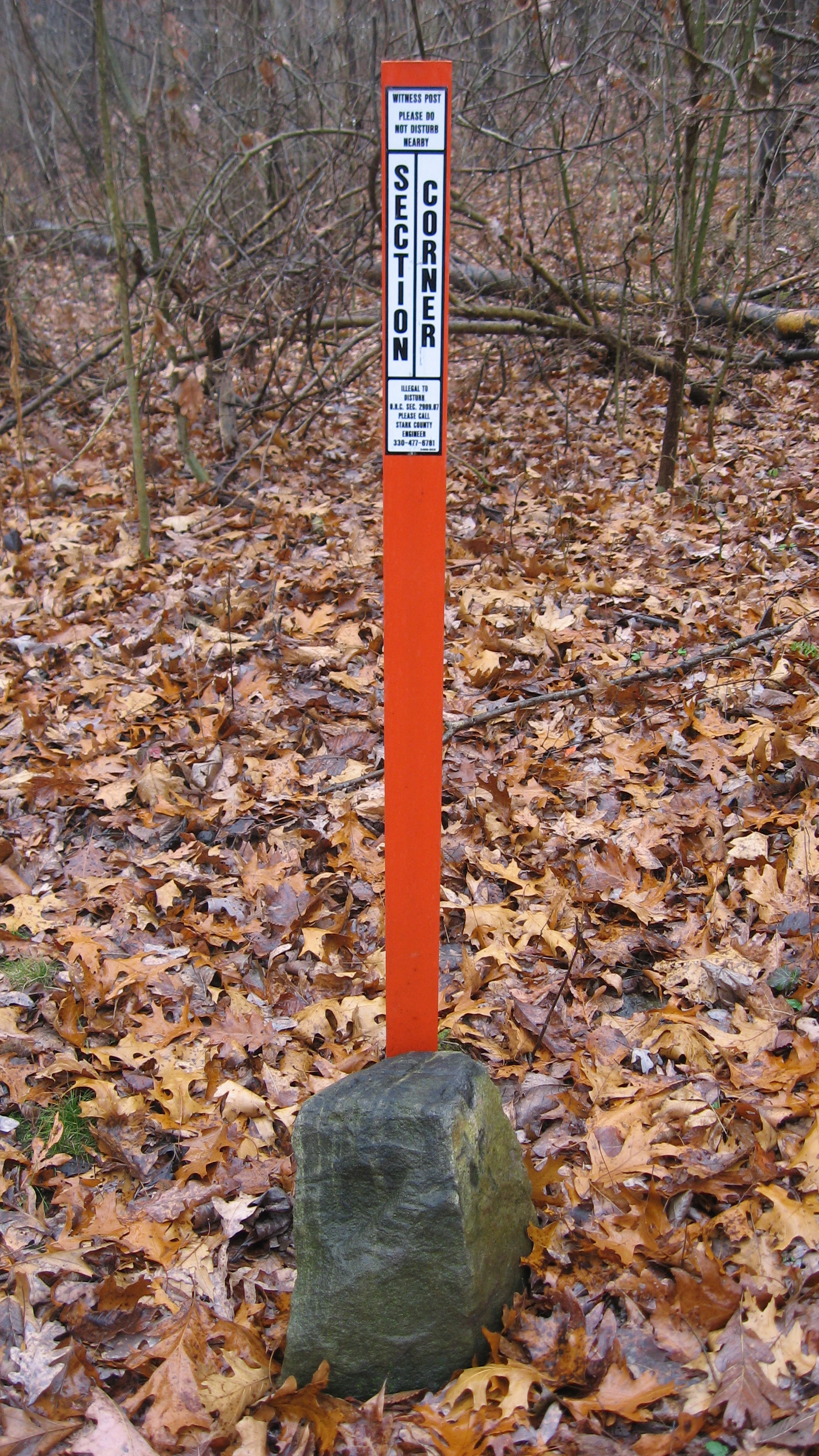
- The marker with a modern surveying marker

- Location within Ohio Location within the United States
- Nearest city: Magnolia, Ohio
- Coordinates: 40°39′7″N 81°19′5″W
- Built: August 10, 1786
- NRHP reference No.: 76001527
- Added to NRHP: December 12, 1976

Seven Ranges Terminus is a stone surveying marker near Magnolia, Ohio that marks the completion in 1786 of the first step in opening the lands northwest of the Ohio River to sale and settlement by Americans. This survey marked the first application of the rectangular plan for subdividing land in the United States, which was to be widely used in nearly all later surveys of western lands in the U.S.

== History ==
With victory in the Revolutionary War, the Treaty of Paris granted the United States lands north of the Ohio River, south of the Great Lakes, and east of the Mississippi River, called the Northwest Territory. The US Congress adopted the Land Ordinance of 1785 as a method for surveying, selling and settling these lands. This ordinance established a method for surveying the land into a grid of six mile square survey townships. These townships were to be arranged into vertical rows called “Ranges”. The first ranges were to be measured from a meridian along the western boundary of Pennsylvania. The townships in each range were measured from an east-west line called a baseline. This became the genesis of the techniques used in the Public Land Survey System.

The 1785 ordinance called for the Geographer of the United States, Thomas Hutchins, to personally supervise the first survey. It called for Hutchins to establish a Point of Beginning on the north bank of the Ohio River where it leaves Pennsylvania. From there he was to establish a baseline seven ranges wide, (42 miles), called the “Geographer’s Line”, and then survey north-south lines each six miles to mark the edges of the ranges, and then establish the south boundary of each township. After each seven ranges had been completed, the Geographer was to return plats to the federal government for marketing and sale.

Hutchins, along with prominent surveyors from ten states appointed by Congress, began surveying the Geographer's Line in 1785, but stopped after only a few miles because of troubles with Indians. In 1786, with protection of troops from Fort Steuben, Hutchins resumed the survey. In September 1786, Hutchins placed a stone cadastral survey marker at the west edge of the seventh range on the Geographer's Line, a spot later to be known as the Seven Ranges Terminus. After the first surveyed seven ranges had been completed some years later, the survey tract was known as the Seven Ranges, or Old Seven Ranges.

== The Survey Marker ==
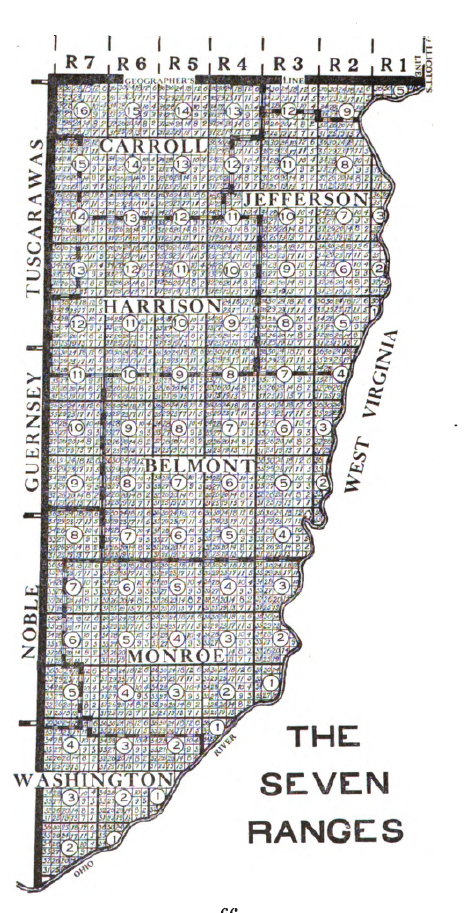
The Seven Ranges Terminus lies at the northwest corner of the tract in Ohio

The survey marker lies at the corner of four townships, three counties, and three survey tracts:

- Rose Township, Carroll County, Ohio Township 16, Range 7 of Old Seven Ranges
- Sandy Township, Stark County, Ohio Township 17, Range 7 of Congress Lands North of Old Seven Ranges
- Pike Township, Stark County, Ohio Township 8, Range 8 of Congress Lands North of Old Seven Ranges
- Sandy Township, Tuscarawas County, Ohio Township 10, Range 1 of United States Military District

The marker is property of the federal government, but surrounded by private property. It sits about 288 feet to the west of a public road.

The granite cadastral survey marker is six inches square in cross section with an inscribed X on top, and about a foot protrudes from the ground. Much more is buried. The Canton Repository said August 7, 2003 that the stone leans somewhat because someone tried to dig it up some years ago, before realizing how deep it is buried. Another plausible reason for lean would be two centuries of frost heave.

The Seven Ranges Terminus was listed on the National Register of Historic Places in 1976 for its association with the historic significance of Thomas Hutchins.

== See also ==
- National Register of Historic Places listings in Carroll County, Ohio
- Ohio Lands
