= Conotton Creek =

Conotton Creek One Leg Creek
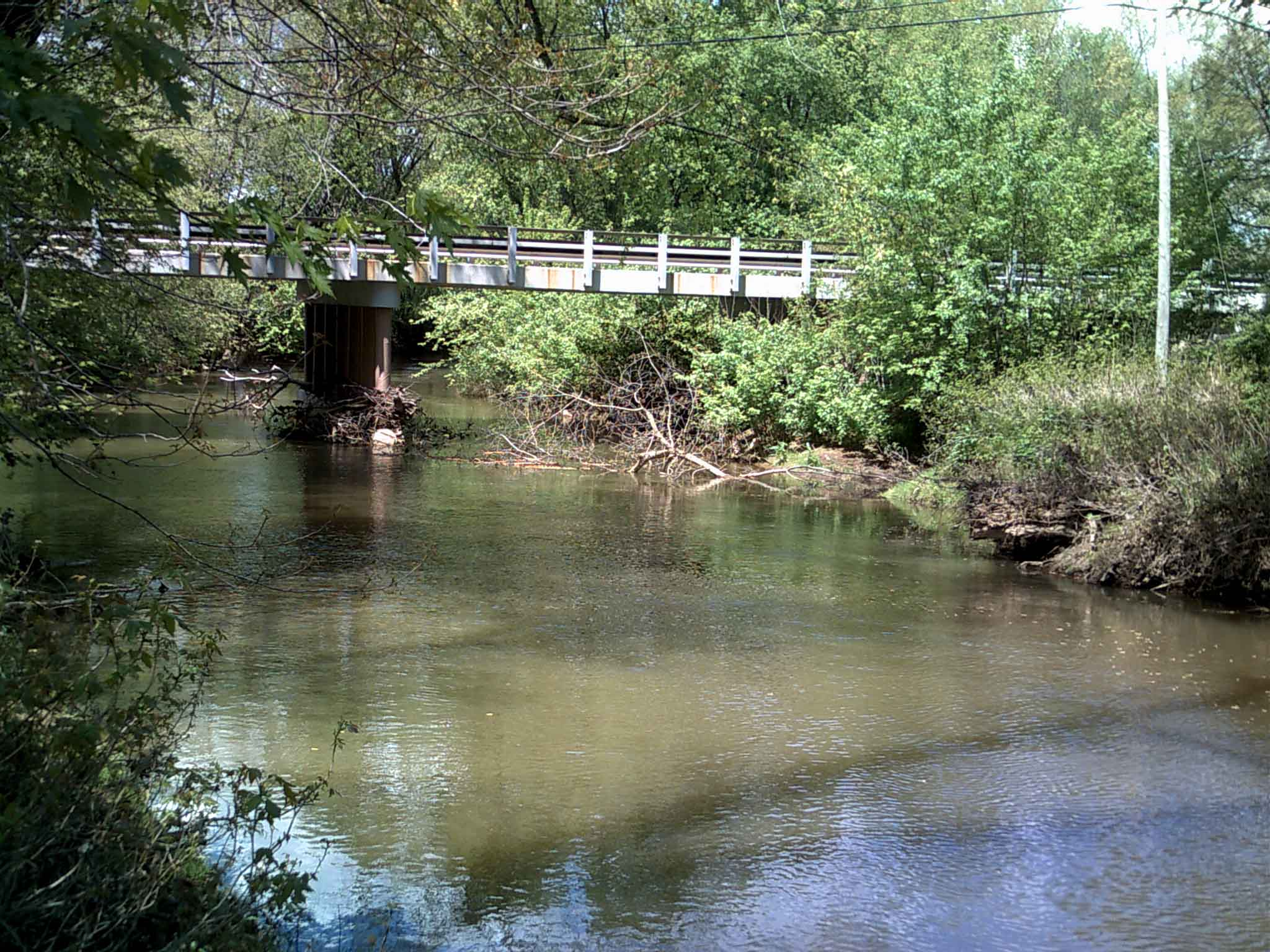
- Connoton Creek flows under Ohio State Route 39 in Sherrodsville, Ohio

Location
- Country: United States
- State: Ohio

Physical characteristics
- Source
  - location: Green Township, Harrison County
  - coordinates: 40°19′42″N 80°57′08″W
  - elevation: 1,240 ft (380 m)
- Mouth: Tuscarawas River
  - location: Fairfield Township, Tuscarawas County
  - coordinates: 40°34′34″N 81°23′32″W
  - elevation: 874 ft (266 m)
- Length: 38.7 mi (62.3 km)
- Basin size: 286 mi^{2} (740 km^{2})

Conotton Creek (/kɒˈnɒtən/ kon-OT-ən) is a tributary of the Tuscarawas River, 38.7 miles (62.3 km) long, in eastern Ohio in the United States. Via the Tuscarawas, Muskingum and Ohio Rivers, it is part of the watershed of the Mississippi River, draining an area of 286 square miles (741 km^{2}) in Carroll, Harrison and Tuscarawas County, Ohio. The source is at 1240 feet and the mouth is at 874 feet. Dover Dam, downstream on the Tuscarawas river, is normally dry, but can impound a reservoir on Conotton and tributaries to a pool elevation of 916 feet for downstream flood control by the Corps of Engineers. From its source in eastern Harrison County, Ohio the creek flows west northwest through Jewitt, Scio, Conotton, Bowerston, Leesville, Sherrodsville, New Cumberland and Somerdale before reaching its mouth in central Tuscarawas County, Ohio. The Wheeling and Lake Erie Railway is situated in the valley. Ohio State Route 151 runs in the valley from near the source to Bowerston. Ohio State Route 212 run along the valley from Bowerston to the mouth. The Conotton Creek Trail runs from Bowerston to Jewett.

The stream was declared navigable by the Ohio legislature in 1808, but the act was repealed in 1816, probably to allow the construction of mill dams.

== Variant names ==
According to the Geographic Names Information System, Conotton Creek has also been known historically as:

- Connotten Creek
- Connotton Creek
- Conolton Creek
- Conoten Creek
- Gutgatsink Creek
- Kannotten Creek
- Kennottenhead Creek
- Knottenhead Creek
- One Leg Creek

Conotton Creek was known in the 19th century as One Leg Creek, named for an Indian who lived near its mouth.

== Named Tributaries and sub-Tributaries ==
Tributary Name	Flows Into	Source Elevation feet	Mouth Elevation feet	Mouth Location	Length miles	Drainage Area sq. Miles	notes
Huff Run	Conotton Creek	1066	875	40°35′18″N 81°22′35″W	9.9	13.9	A, Mineral City, Morges, Lindentree
Beggar Run	Conotton Creek	980	879	40°33′39″N 81°19′2″W	2.7	4.45	A
Dog Run	Conotton Creek	1029	880	40°32′30″N 81°18′25″W	3.5	2.94	A
Indian Fork	Conotton Creek	1116	887	40°31′18″N 81°17′40″W	18.9	70.3	A B Dellroy
Elliott Run	Indian Fork	1040	916	40°33′58″N 81°12′38″W	3.5	4.63	B
Dellroy Creek	Indian Fork	980	917	40°33′22″N 81°12′3″W	1.5	1.3	B
Willow Run	Indian Fork	1040	919	40°33′59″N 81°11′48″W	4.8	8.99	B, a.k.a. Messer Run
Pleasant Valley Run	Indian Fork	1080	936	40°33′18″N 81°9′17″W	4.4	8	B, New Harrisburg
Cold Spring Run	Indian Fork	1146	953	40°33′59″N 81°7′43″W	3.4	6.39	
Town Creek	Indian Fork	1120	974	40°33′52″N 81°4′58″W	2.6	3.85	Carrollton
Gant Creek	Indian Fork	1116	974	40°33′26″N 81°5′37″W	4.6	8.33	
Thompson Run	Conotton Creek	1060	903	40°30′07″N 81°14′58″W	3.5	4.11	A
Holmes Run	Conotton Creek	1000	917	40°28′52″N 81°13′29″W	2.2	2.65	Leavittsville
McGuire Creek	Conotton Creek	1230	920	40°28′30″N 81°13′3″W	11.8	49.6	C
North Fork McGuire Creek	McGuire Creek	1218	927	40°28′20″N 81°11′35″W	12.6	26.6	C Petersburg
Bear Hole Run	North Fork McGuire Creek	1071	948	40°30′44″N 81°8′52″W	2.4	2.83	C
Scott Run	Conotton Creek	1200	947	40°24′59″N 81°8′39″W	4.7	3.23	
Dining Fork	Conotton Creek	1270	974	40°24′25″N 81°6′12″W	8	14.7	Kilgore
Kirby Run	Dining Fork	1235	974	40°25′23″N 81°4′57″W	3.3	3.47	
Irish Creek	Conotton Creek	1240	967	40°23′37″N 81°4′52″W	7.6	18.8	a.k.a. Alder Creek, Snow Creek
Lick Fork	Irish Creek	1237	998	40°24′40″N 81°2′7″W	4	5.05	New Rumley
Snow Creek	Irish Creek	1240	1035	40°23′37″N 81°4′52″W	3.4	4.72	
Jefferson Creek	Conotton Creek	1270	1116	40°22′2″N 80°59′46″W	4.6	6.56	Germano

=== Note A ===
Dover Dam 40°33′26″N 81°24′44″W, on Tuscarawas River is normally dry, but can inundate this waterway to a pool elevation of 916 feet for downstream flood control by the corps of engineers.

=== Note B ===
Atwood Dam 40°31′36″N 81°17′5″W, near the mouth of Indian Fork, impounds Atwood Lake to a normal pool elevation of 928 feet and a maximum elevation of 941 feet on this waterway.

=== Note C ===
Leesville Dam40°28′6″N 81°11′41″W sits on McGuire Creek and impounds Leesville Lake to a normal pool elevation of 963 feet and a maximum elevation of 977.5 feet on this waterway.

== See also ==
- List of rivers of Ohio
- Conotton Valley Union Local School District
- Conotton Creek Trail
