= Morges, Ohio =

Unincorporated community in Ohio, U.S.

Coordinates: 40°38′03″N 81°14′30″W

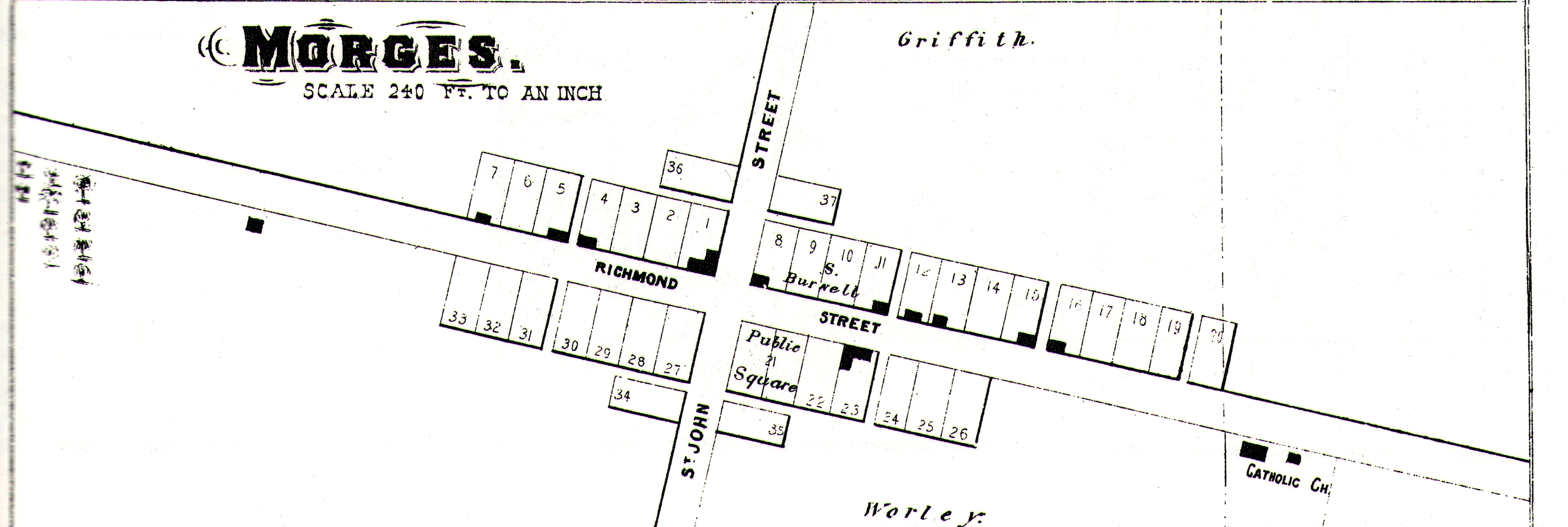
1874 map

Morges (/ˈmɔːrdʒɛz/ MOR-jez) is an unincorporated community in Rose Township, Carroll County, Ohio, United States. The community is part of the Canton–Massillon Metropolitan Statistical Area. Part of the community is served by Waynesburg, post office 44688, and part by Magnolia, post office 44643.

== History ==
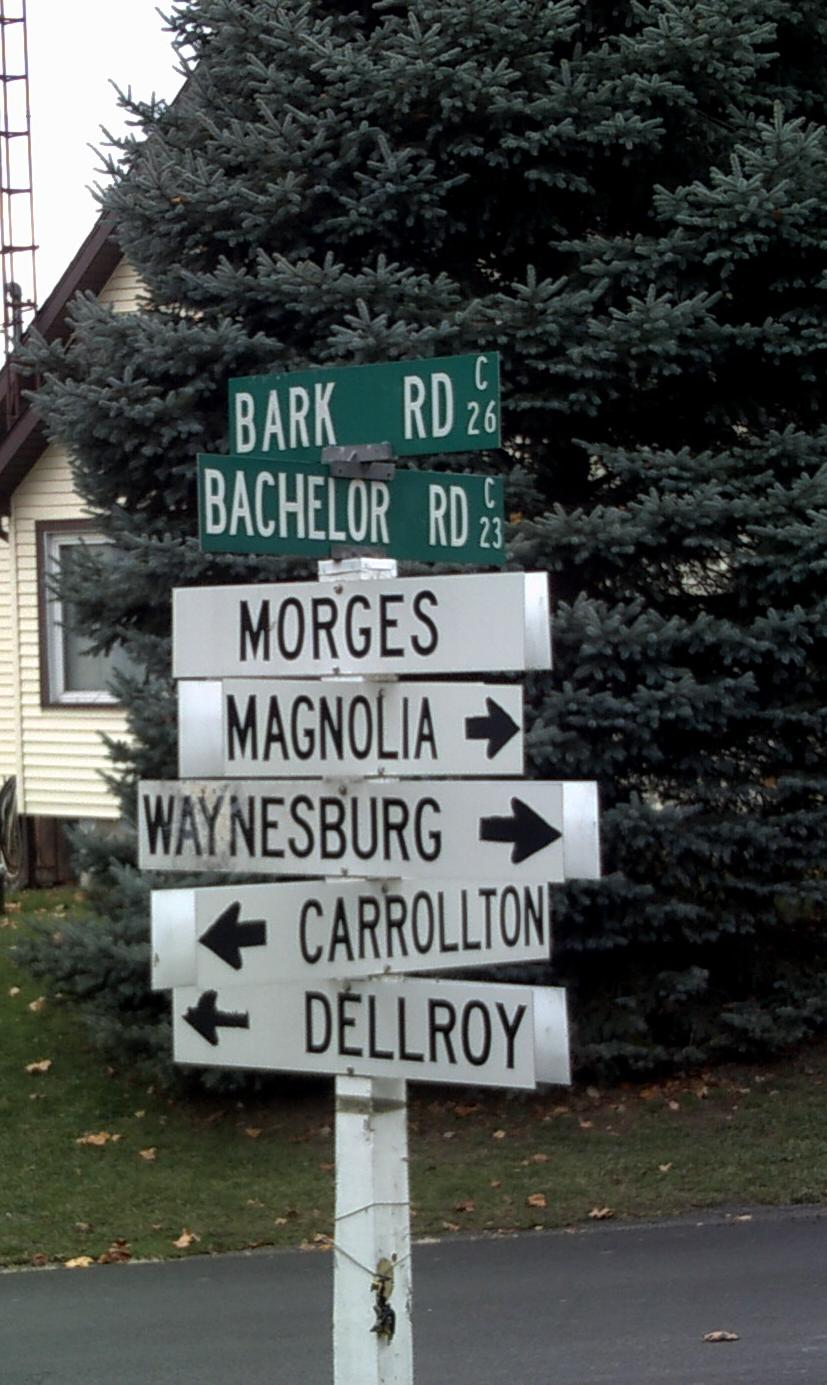
Sign at crossroads in Morges

The community was platted in 1831 by Samuel Oswalt and John Waggoner along the road established by Bezaleel Wells between Canton and Steubenville, Ohio.

St. Mary's of Morges is listed in the National Register of Historic Places.

== Education ==
Students attend the Sandy Valley Local School District.
