= Huff Run =

- Huff Run at low flow, September 2005

Location
- Country: United States
- State: Ohio

Physical characteristics
- Source
  - location: Rose Township, Carroll County
  - coordinates: 40°38′49″N 81°12′54″W
  - elevation: 1,066 ft (325 m)
- Mouth: Conotton Creek
  - location: Sandy Township, Tuscarawas County
  - coordinates: 40°35′18″N 81°22′35″W
  - elevation: 875 ft (267 m)
- Length: 9.9 mi (15.9 km)
- Basin size: 13.9 mi^{2} (36 km^{2})
- Discharge
  - location: near mouth 40°35′50″N 81°21′33″W
  - minimum: 4.2 cu ft/s (0.12 m^{3}/s)
  - maximum: 80 cu ft/s (2.3 m^{3}/s)

Huff Run is a 9.9 mile (15.9 km) long tributary of the Conotton Creek in eastern Ohio within Sandy Township (Tuscarawas County) and Rose Township (Carroll County). Conotton Creek is a tributary of the Ohio River via the Tuscarawas River and the Muskingum River. Mineral City is the only incorporated town within the Huff Run Watershed.

The mouth of the stream is at 875 feet altitude. Dover Dam 40°33′26″N 81°24′44″W, downstream on the Tuscarawas River, is normally dry, but can inundate this waterway to a pool elevation of 916 feet for downstream flood control by the Corps of Engineers. This can cause flooding and closure of Route 800 south of Mineral City and other roads out of the village. The stream gauge south of Mineral City is at 886.98 feet, and is rendered inoperable when reservoir elevation exceeds that.

== History ==
The first recognized settler of Sandy Township was Godfrey Huff, who Huff Run was named after. Records show that he was from Bedford County, Pennsylvania. In May 1805 he purchased a tract of 1,000 acres (4 km^{2}) in the southwest corner of the third quarter of Township 10, Range 1, or the southwest corner of Sandy Township, embracing also the corner of Lawrence across the river from Godfrey Haga, for $1,062.50. Old settlers have assigned the year 1803 as the date of his emigration to this tract, but historical societies have found evidence that he was here in 1801. Mr. Huff was a man of large frame, and wore the broad-brimmed hat and the garb of the Dunkard Brethren church, of which he was a member. He is said to have raised many hogs on the river bottoms, driven them to Detroit, Michigan for sale, and used the proceeds to pay for his land. He had five sons—Michael, Henry, Samuel, Frederick and Andrew. Most of the boys subsequently emigrated to Iowa. Godfrey Huff died in Sandy Township about 1825.

See Native American History and additional early settlement history at the Tuscarawas County Wikipedia entry.

== Pollution ==
Huff Run has been badly affected by acid mine drainage (AMD) as well as illegal open dumping, raw sewage entering the stream due to improperly maintained septic systems and sewer systems, poor riparian buffer zones, some poor agriculture land management practices and over extraction of oil and gas within the watershed.

The Huff Run Watershed Restoration Partnership , sponsored by Rural Action , has been working since 1996 to address water quality issues in the Huff Run watershed. As of 2009, the partnership had received and spent about 6.2 million dollars in state and federal grant money to reduce the impact of acid mine drainage on the watershed. They currently oversee the development and management of over 16 major acid mine drainage reclamation projects.

== See also ==
- List of rivers of Ohio
