= Lindentree, Ohio =

Unincorporated community in Ohio, U.S.

Coordinates: 40°36′18″N 81°18′03″W

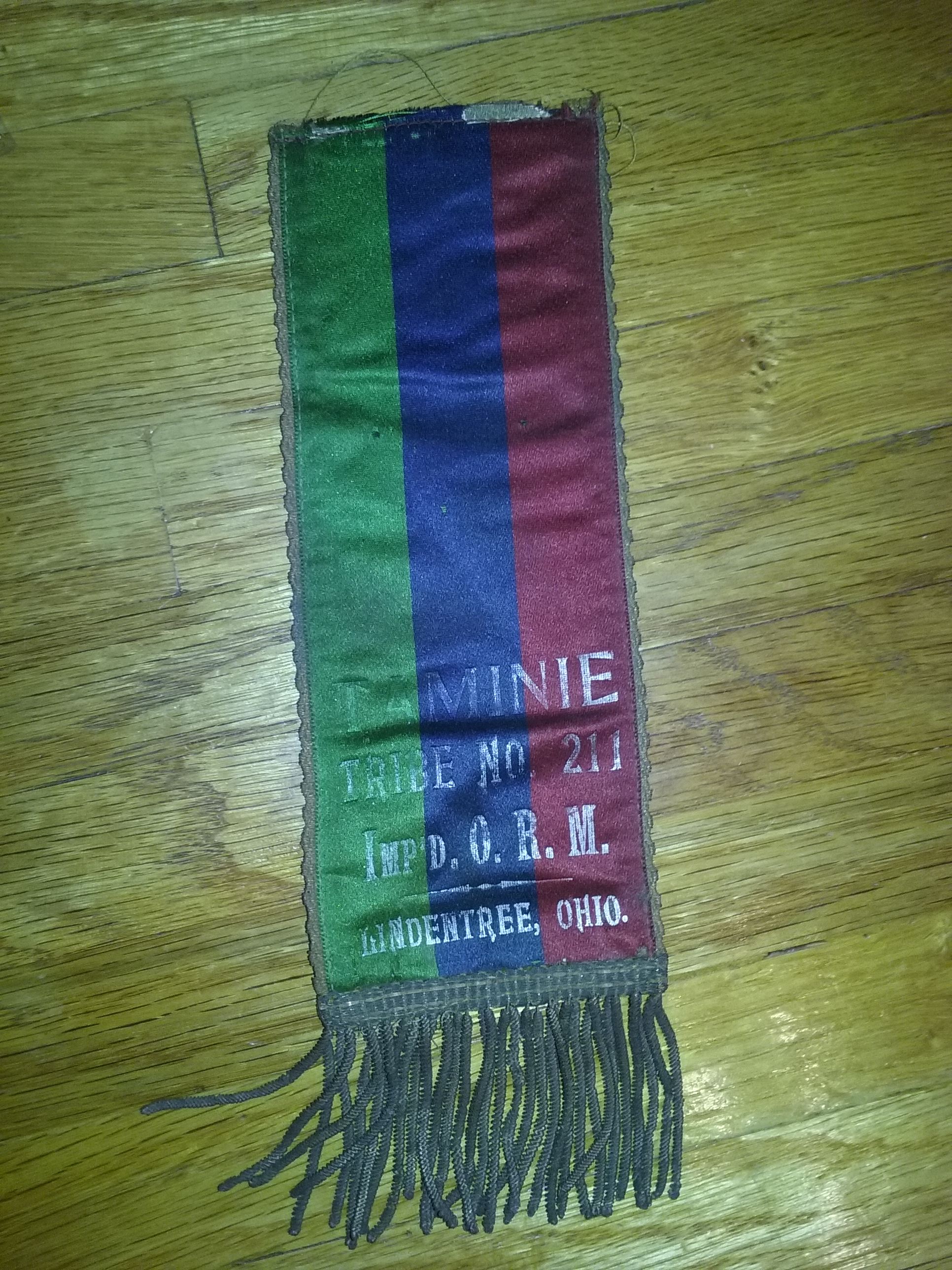
Lindentree once had an IORM tribe.

Lindentree is an unincorporated community in Rose Township, Carroll County, Ohio, United States. The community is part of the Canton–Massillon Metropolitan Statistical Area and is served by the Mineral City post office, ZIP code 44645. Lindentree is located on Huff Run.

== History ==
Linnie Davis founded the village when he constructed a railroad into the area. Lindentree was a coal boomtown. It had a Brethren Church and a school, which were both razed in the 1920s, about the same time as the railroad failure.

== Education ==
Students attend the Sandy Valley Local School District.
