= Sandy Township, Ohio =

Sandy Township, Ohio may refer to:

- Sandy Township, Stark County, Ohio
- Sandy Township, Tuscarawas County, Ohio
