= Sandy Valley High School =

Coordinates: 40°38′14″N 81°21′11″W

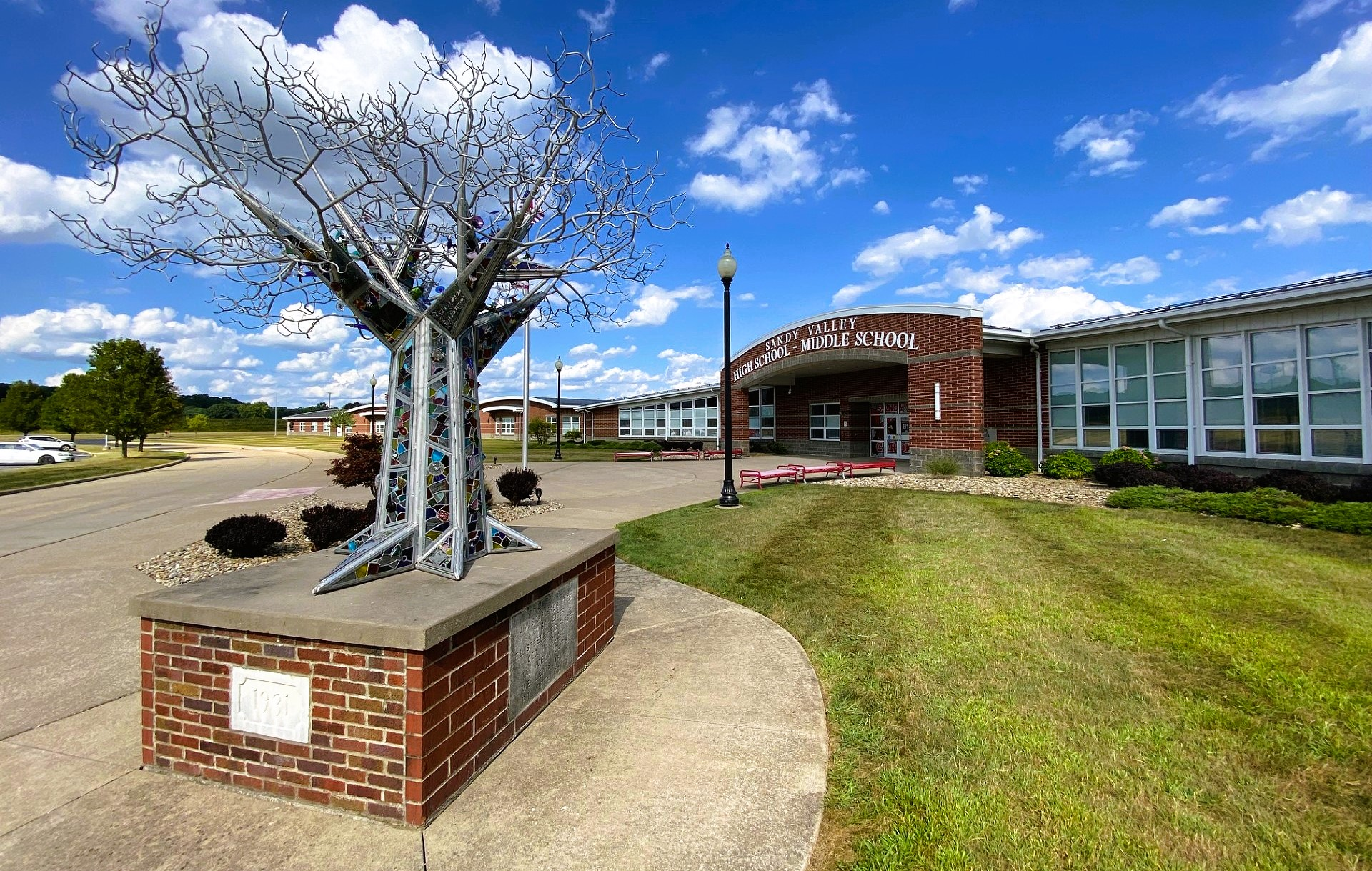

Location
- 5130 OH-183 NE; Sandy Township, (Tuscarawas County), Ohio 44643; United States

Information
- Type: Public, Coeducational high school
- Grades: 9-12
- Enrollment: 440 (2023-2024)
- Colors: Red & Gray
- Athletics conference: Inter-Valley Conference
- Nickname: Cardinals
- Website: https://www.sandyvalleylocal.org/svhs

Sandy Valley High School is a public high school near Magnolia, Ohio, United States. It is the only high school in the Sandy Valley Local Schools district. Its mascot is a cardinal and its colors are red and gray. A new high school building opened January 20, 2009.

== Academics ==
Sandy Valley currently offers 7 Advanced Placement (AP) courses: AP Literature and Composition, AP Calculus AB, AP Biology, AP Spanish Language, AP Government, and AP Modern American History.

== Athletics ==
Sandy Valley offers 8 boys and 8 girls sports in the Inter Valley Conference, including:
Boys Football Division IV
Girls Volleyball Division III
Boys and Girls Cross Country Division III (Both)
Boys and Girls Golf Division II (Boys) Division I (Girls)
Boys Wrestling Division III
Girls Gymnastics Division I
Boys and Girls Basketball Division III (Both)
Boys and Girls Bowling Division I (Both)
Boys Baseball Division III
Girls Softball Division III
Boys and Girls Track and Field Division II (Both)
