= Conotton Creek Trail =

Rail trail in Ohio, United States

Coordinates: 40.382582°N 81.061845°W

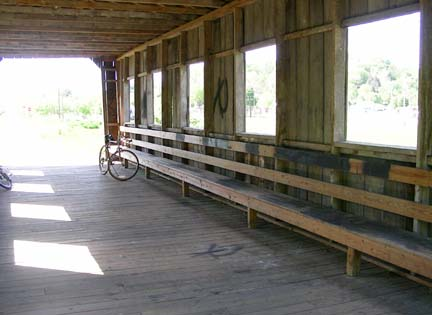
- Interior of covered bridge in Scio, Ohio
- Length: 11.2 miles (18.0 km)
- Location: Harrison County, Ohio
- Trailheads: Bowerston, Ohio; Conotton, Ohio; Scio, Ohio; Jewett, Ohio
- Use: Cycling, hiking
- Surface: Paved roadway

Trail map
- Map

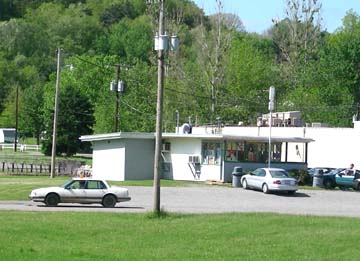
B&F Dairy Bar near trail

The Conotton Creek Trail is a rail trail in Ohio, running from Bowerston to Jewett in northern Harrison County. The trail spains 11.2 miles one way or 22.4 miles round trip.

The paved multi-use trail is suitable for biking, unicycling, roller-blading, wheel chairing, jogging, and walking. It features six bridges, two of which (in Scio and Jewett) are covered. The trail has 40 birdhouses to attract tree swallows and bluebirds. The Rails-to-Trails Conservancy chose it as its "Trail of the Month" for March 2002.

The trail is owned by Harrison County, and is managed by a committee of trail advocates

The trail is a part of the Great American Rail-Trail.
