= Conotton Valley High School =

Public high school in Carroll County, Ohio, United States

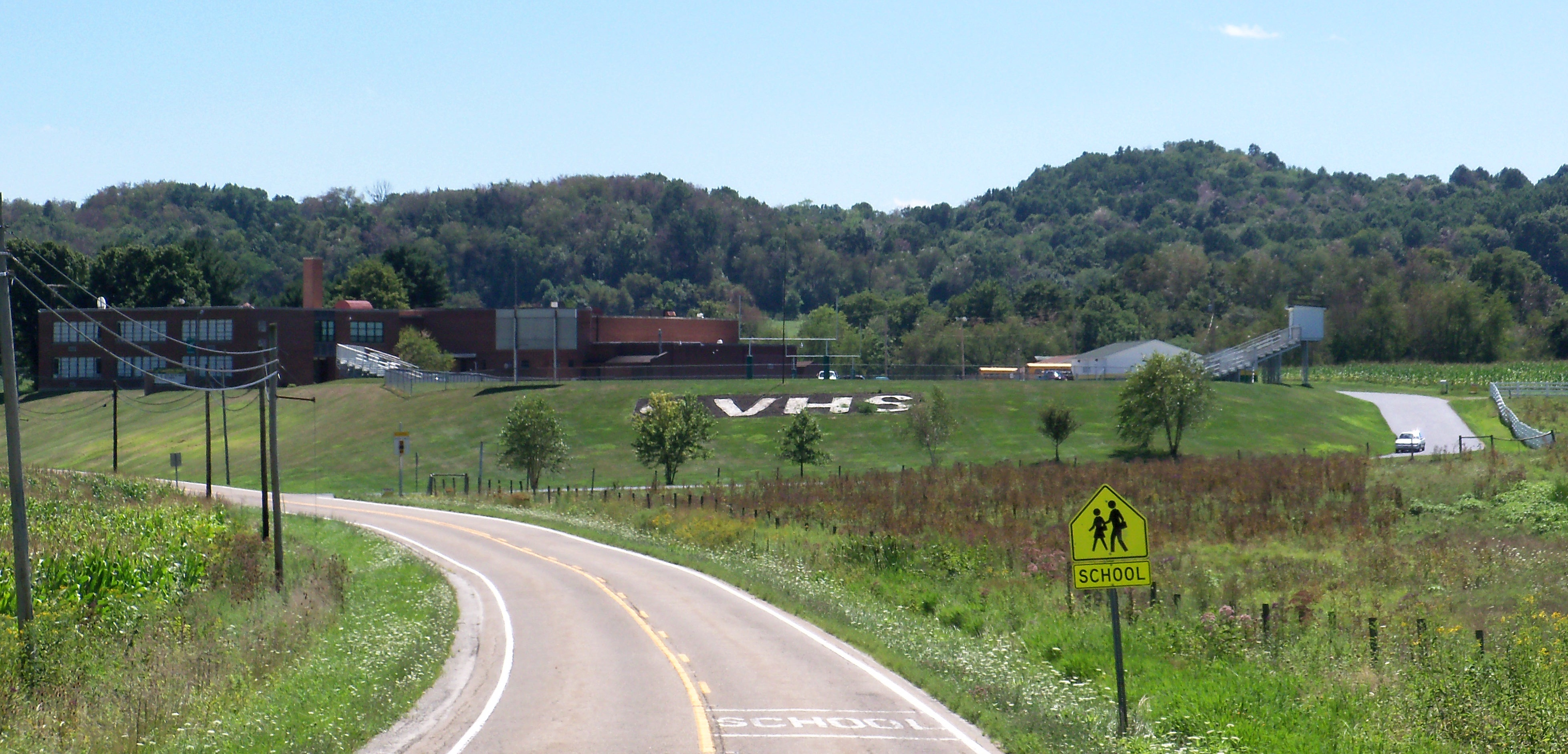

Location
- 7205 Cumberland Road SW; Bowerston (Orange Township), Carroll County, Ohio 44695; United States; 40°27′46″N 81°13′8″W

Information
- Type: Public, Coeducational high school
- Superintendent: John R. Zucal
- Principal: Danielle Caldwell and Carl McCrory
- Teaching staff: 19.00 (FTE)
- Grades: 6-12
- Student to teacher ratio: 11.89
- Colors: Green and White and Gold
- Athletics conference: Inter-Valley Conference
- Team name: Rockets
- Athletic Director: Edward Marsh
- Website: School website

Conotton Valley High School is a public high school near Bowerston, Ohio, United States. The building itself is physically located in Orange Township, Carroll County. It is the only high school in the Conotton Valley Union Local School District. Their nickname is the Rockets. The Rockets are members of the Ohio Valley Athletic Conference and the Inter Valley Conference.

== Athletics ==
=== State championships ===
- Girls Bowling – 2023
