= Conotton, Ohio =

Unincorporated community in Ohio, US

Coordinates: 40°25′02″N 81°08′47″W

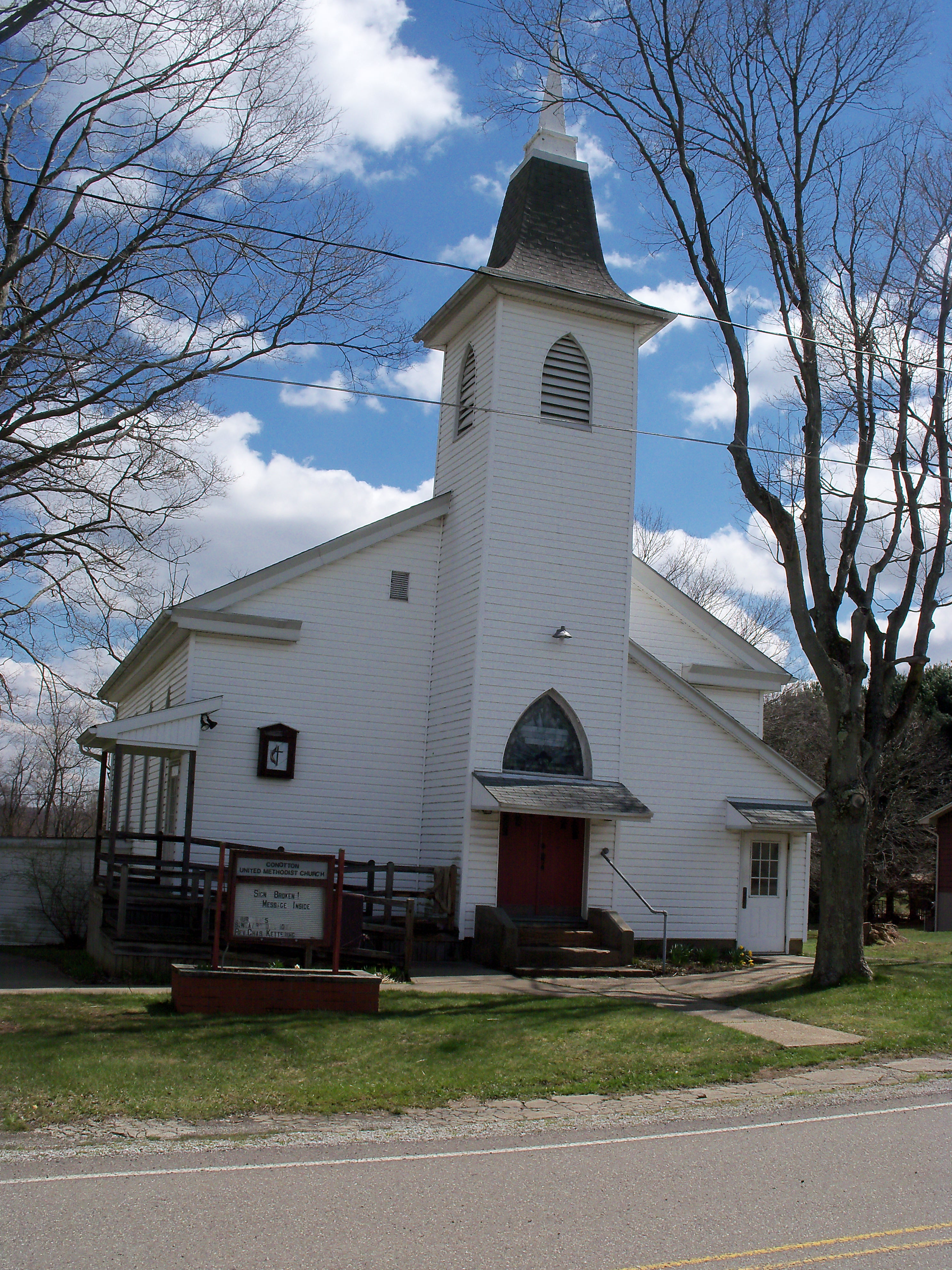
Conotton United Methodist Church

Conotton is an unincorporated community in North Township, Harrison County, Ohio, United States. The community is serviced by the Bowerston post office, ZIP Code 44695. It is located near Conotton Creek, State Route 151 and the Wheeling and Lake Erie Railway. According to the GNIS the community has also been known as Masterville.

== History ==
A post office was in operation at Conotton from 1828 until 1960. Conotton is a name believed to be derived from an unidentified Native American language.

== Education ==
Students attend the Conotton Valley Union Local School District.
