= Scio, Ohio =

- Village
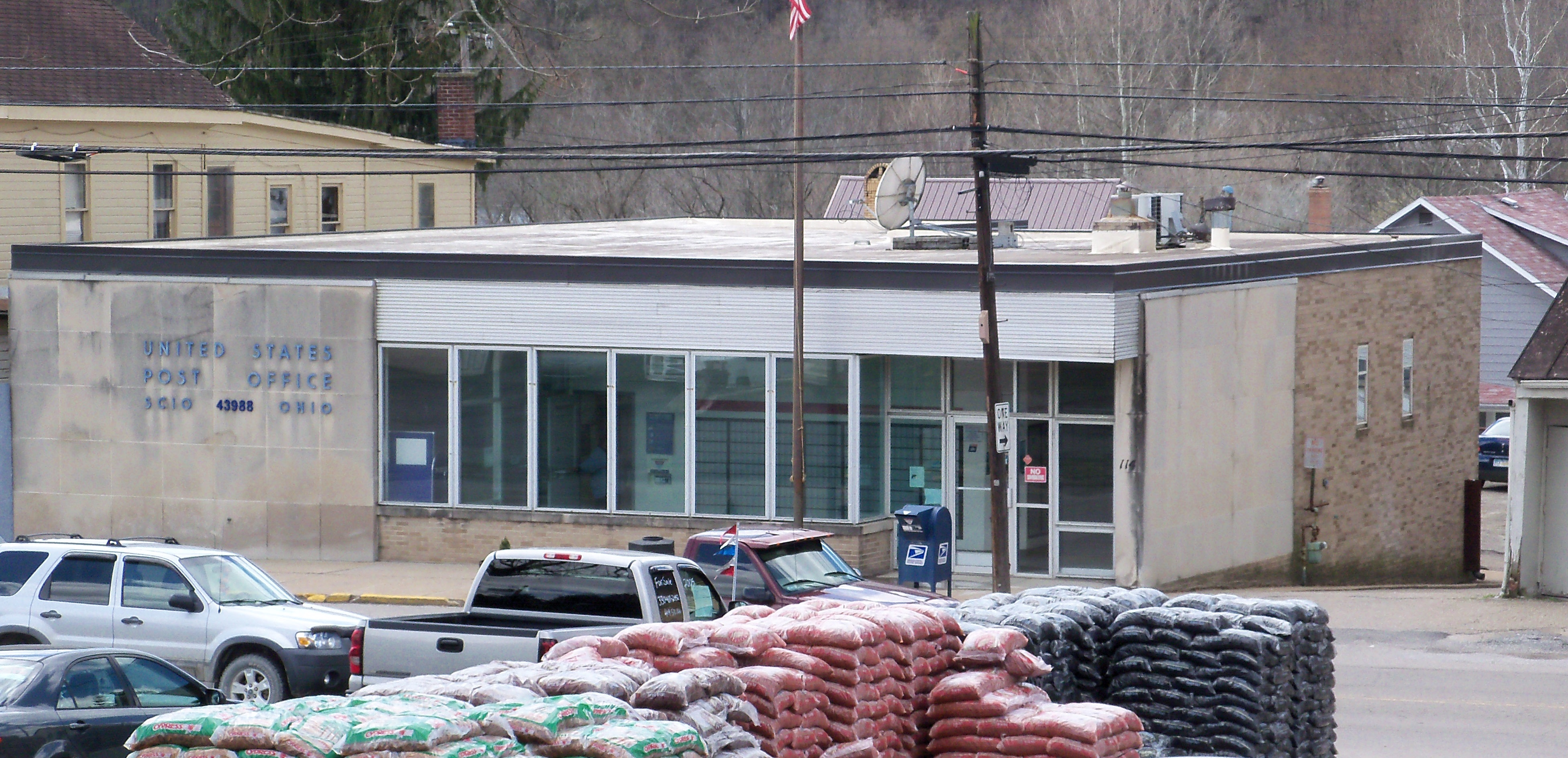
- Scio Post Office

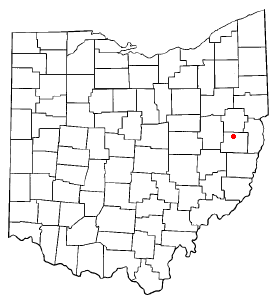
- Location of Scio, Ohio

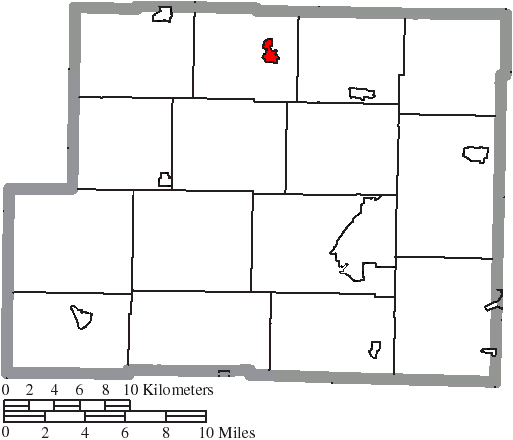
- Location of Scio in Harrison County
- Coordinates: 40°23′56″N 81°05′17″W
- Country: United States
- State: Ohio
- County: Harrison
- Township: North
- Platted: 1852

Area
  - Total: 0.56 sq mi (1.44 km^{2})
  - Land: 0.56 sq mi (1.44 km^{2})
  - Water: 0 sq mi (0.00 km^{2})
- Elevation: 968 ft (295 m)

Population (2020)
  - Total: 673
  - Density: 1,208.5/sq mi (466.61/km^{2})
- Time zone: UTC-5 (Eastern (EST))
  - Summer (DST): UTC-4 (EDT)
- ZIP code: 43988
- Area code: 740
- FIPS code: 39-70814
- GNIS feature ID: 2399773
- Website: Village website

Scio (/ˈsaɪoʊ/ SY-oh) is a village in North Township, Harrison County, Ohio, United States. The population was 673 at the 2020 census.

== History ==
Scio was originally called New Market, and under the latter name was platted in 1852.

== Geography ==
According to the United States Census Bureau, the village has a total area of 0.56 square miles (1.45 km^{2}), all land.

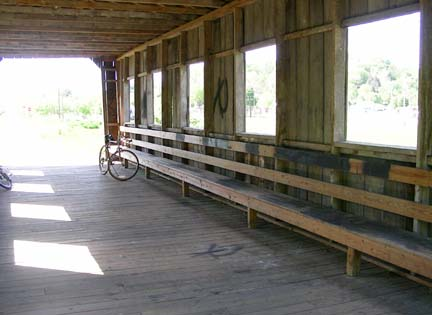
Inside the community's covered bridge

== Demographics ==
Historical population
| Census | Pop. | Note | %± |
|---|---|---|---|
| 1880 | 509 | | — |
| 1890 | 797 | | 56.6% |
| 1900 | 868 | | 8.9% |
| 1910 | 877 | | 1.0% |
| 1920 | 861 | | −1.8% |
| 1930 | 760 | | −11.7% |
| 1940 | 1,181 | | 55.4% |
| 1950 | 1,152 | | −2.5% |
| 1960 | 1,135 | | −1.5% |
| 1970 | 1,002 | | −11.7% |
| 1980 | 1,003 | | 0.1% |
| 1990 | 856 | | −14.7% |
| 2000 | 799 | | −6.7% |
| 2010 | 763 | | −4.5% |
| 2020 | 673 | | −11.8% |
U.S. Decennial Census

=== 2010 census ===
As of the census of 2010, there were 763 people, 324 households, and 194 families living in the village. The population density was 1,362.5 inhabitants per square mile (526.1/km^{2}). There were 379 housing units at an average density of 676.8 per square mile (261.3/km^{2}). The racial makeup of the village was 98.3% White and 1.7% from two or more races. Hispanic or Latino of any race were 0.1% of the population.

There were 324 households, of which 32.4% had children under the age of 18 living with them, 36.7% were married couples living together, 17.3% had a female householder with no husband present, 5.9% had a male householder with no wife present, and 40.1% were non-families. 37.0% of all households were made up of individuals, and 16% had someone living alone who was 65 years of age or older. The average household size was 2.35 and the average family size was 3.01.

The median age in the village was 38.5 years. 26.1% of residents were under the age of 18; 9.1% were between the ages of 18 and 24; 22.5% were from 25 to 44; 26.8% were from 45 to 64; and 15.3% were 65 years of age or older. The gender makeup of the village was 47.4% male and 52.6% female.

=== 2000 census ===
As of the census of 2000, there were 799 people, 358 households, and 220 families living in the village. The population density was 1,446.9 inhabitants per square mile (558.7/km^{2}). There were 400 housing units at an average density of 724.3 per square mile (279.7/km^{2}). The racial makeup of the village was 99.62% White, 0.13% African American and 0.25% Native American. Hispanic or Latino of any race were 0.75% of the population.

There were 358 households, out of which 30.2% had children under the age of 18 living with them, 43.0% were married couples living together, 14.0% had a female householder with no husband present, and 38.3% were non-families. 36.0% of all households were made up of individuals, and 20.1% had someone living alone who was 65 years of age or older. The average household size was 2.23 and the average family size was 2.88.

In the village, the population was spread out, with 24.7% under the age of 18, 7.0% from 18 to 24, 24.3% from 25 to 44, 25.4% from 45 to 64, and 18.6% who were 65 years of age or older. The median age was 41 years. For every 100 females there were 82.8 males. For every 100 females age 18 and over, there were 74.0 males.

The median income for a household in the village was $23,214, and the median income for a family was $30,278. Males had a median income of $26,333 versus $17,625 for females. The per capita income for the village was $17,037. About 13.9% of families and 13.9% of the population were below the poverty line, including 17.8% of those under age 18 and 7.7% of those age 65 or over.

== Conotton Creek Trail ==
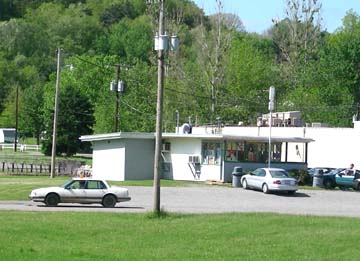
B & F Dairy Bar

Scio is the midpoint of the multi-use rails-to-trails path, the Conotton Creek Trail. The trail runs along Conotton Creek and is 11.4 miles (18.3 km) long. It is paved and wheelchair accessible, and is also suitable for bicycling, rollerblading, and walking.

== Education ==
Students attend the Harrison Hills City School District.

From 1877 or 1878 to 1911 the Scio College was in the town, until it merged with Mount Union College and the Scio campus closed.

Scio has a public library, a branch of the Puskarich Public Library .
