= Jewett, Ohio =

- Village
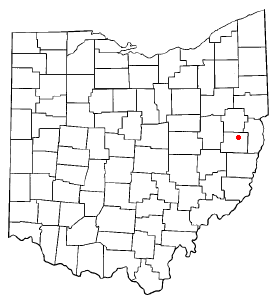
- Location of Jewett, Ohio

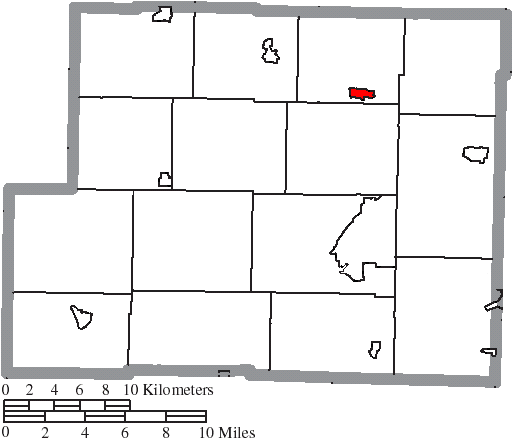
- Location of Jewett in Harrison County
- Coordinates: 40°22′04″N 81°00′05″W
- Country: United States
- State: Ohio
- County: Harrison
- Township: Rumley

Area
  - Total: 0.51 sq mi (1.32 km^{2})
  - Land: 0.51 sq mi (1.32 km^{2})
  - Water: 0 sq mi (0.00 km^{2})
- Elevation: 1,027 ft (313 m)

Population (2020)
  - Total: 554
  - Density: 1,089.0/sq mi (420.48/km^{2})
- Time zone: UTC-5 (Eastern (EST))
  - Summer (DST): UTC-4 (EDT)
- ZIP code: 43986
- Area code: 740
- FIPS code: 39-39172
- GNIS feature ID: 2398302

Jewett is a village in Rumley Township, Harrison County, Ohio, United States. The population was 554 at the 2020 census.

== History ==
Jewett was originally called Fairview, and under the latter name was platted in 1851. The present name is for T. M. Jewett, a railroad official.

Jewett was the original home of the Jewett Car Company, a street car manufacturer, from 1894 until 1904. The street cars produced by this factory were shipped throughout the United States. The Jewett Car Company relocated to Newark, Ohio in 1904, and ceased operations in 1919.

== Geography ==
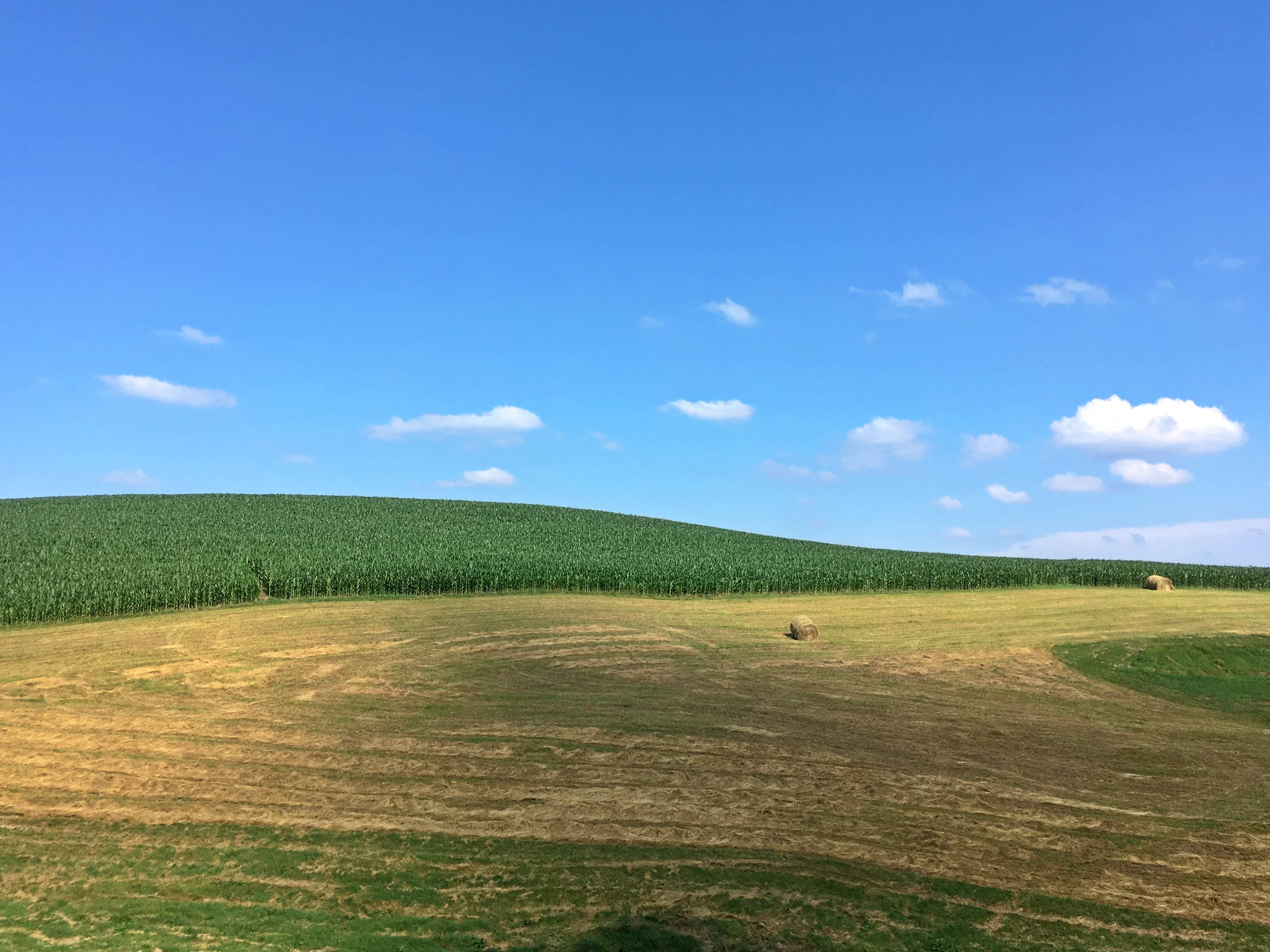
Rolling farm land just outside Jewett, Ohio.

According to the United States Census Bureau, the village has a total area of 0.51 square miles (1.32 km^{2}), all land.

Jewett is the endpoint of the Conotton Creek Trail, an 11.4-mile (18.3 km) long multi-use rails-to-trails path along the Conotton Creek. It is paved and suitable for bicycling, non-electric scootering, roller blading, wheel chairing, walking, running, and jogging.

== Demographics ==
Historical population
Census	Pop.	Note	%±
1900	743		—
1910	917		23.4%
1920	852		−7.1%
1930	876		2.8%
1940	1,031		17.7%
1950	1,019		−1.2%
1960	925		−9.2%
1970	901		−2.6%
1980	972		7.9%
1990	778		−20.0%
2000	784		0.8%
2010	692		−11.7%
2020	554		−19.9%
U.S. Decennial Census

=== 2010 census ===
As of the census of 2010, there were 692 people, 273 households, and 188 families living in the village. The population density was 1,356.9 inhabitants per square mile (523.9/km^{2}). There were 317 housing units at an average density of 621.6 per square mile (240.0/km^{2}). The racial makeup of the village was 96.7% White, 0.3% African American, 0.1% from other races, and 2.9% from two or more races. Hispanic or Latino of any race were 0.1% of the population.

There were 273 households, 33.7% of which had children under the age of 18 living with them, 50.2% were married couples living together, 11.7% had a female householder with no husband present, 7.0% had a male householder with no wife present, and 31.1% were non-families. 26.0% of all households were made up of individuals, and 11.7% had someone living alone who was 65 years of age or older. The average household size was 2.53 and the average family size was 2.96.

The median age in the village was 36.9 years. 25.6% of residents were under the age of 18; 9.1% were between the ages of 18 and 24; 26.4% were from 25 to 44; 23.9% were from 45 to 64; and 14.9% were 65 years of age or older. The gender makeup of the village was 50.6% male and 49.4% female.

=== 2000 census ===
As of the census of 2000, there were 784 people, 300 households, and 219 families living in the village. The population density was 1,532.2 inhabitants per square mile (591.6/km^{2}). There were 327 housing units at an average density of 639.1 per square mile (246.8/km^{2}). The racial makeup of the village was 98.60% White, 0.26% Native American, and 1.15% from two or more races. Hispanic or Latino of any race were 0.13% of the population.

There were 300 households, 34.7% of which had children under the age of 18 living with them, 55.7% were married couples living together, 13.0% had a female householder with no husband present, and 26.7% were non-families. 24.3% of all households were made up of individuals, and 12.7% had someone living alone who was 65 years of age or older. The average household size was 2.61 and the average family size was 3.05.

The population in the village was spread out, with 28.6% under the age of 18, 7.3% from 18 to 24, 26.7% from 25 to 44, 21.7% from 45 to 64, and 15.8% who were 65 years of age or older. The median age was 36 years. For every 100 females there were 92.6 males. For every 100 females aged 18 and over, there were 87.3 males.

The median income for a household in the village was $27,125, and the median income for a family was $29,297. Males had a median income of $30,313 versus $16,333 for females. The per capita income for the village was $12,158. About 15.8% of families and 21.7% of the population were below the poverty line, including 37.6% of those under age 18 and 4.1% of 65+ residents.
