= St. Mary of the Immaculate Conception Church (Morges, Ohio) =

Historic church in Ohio, United States

- St. Mary's Of Morges
- U.S. National Register of Historic Places
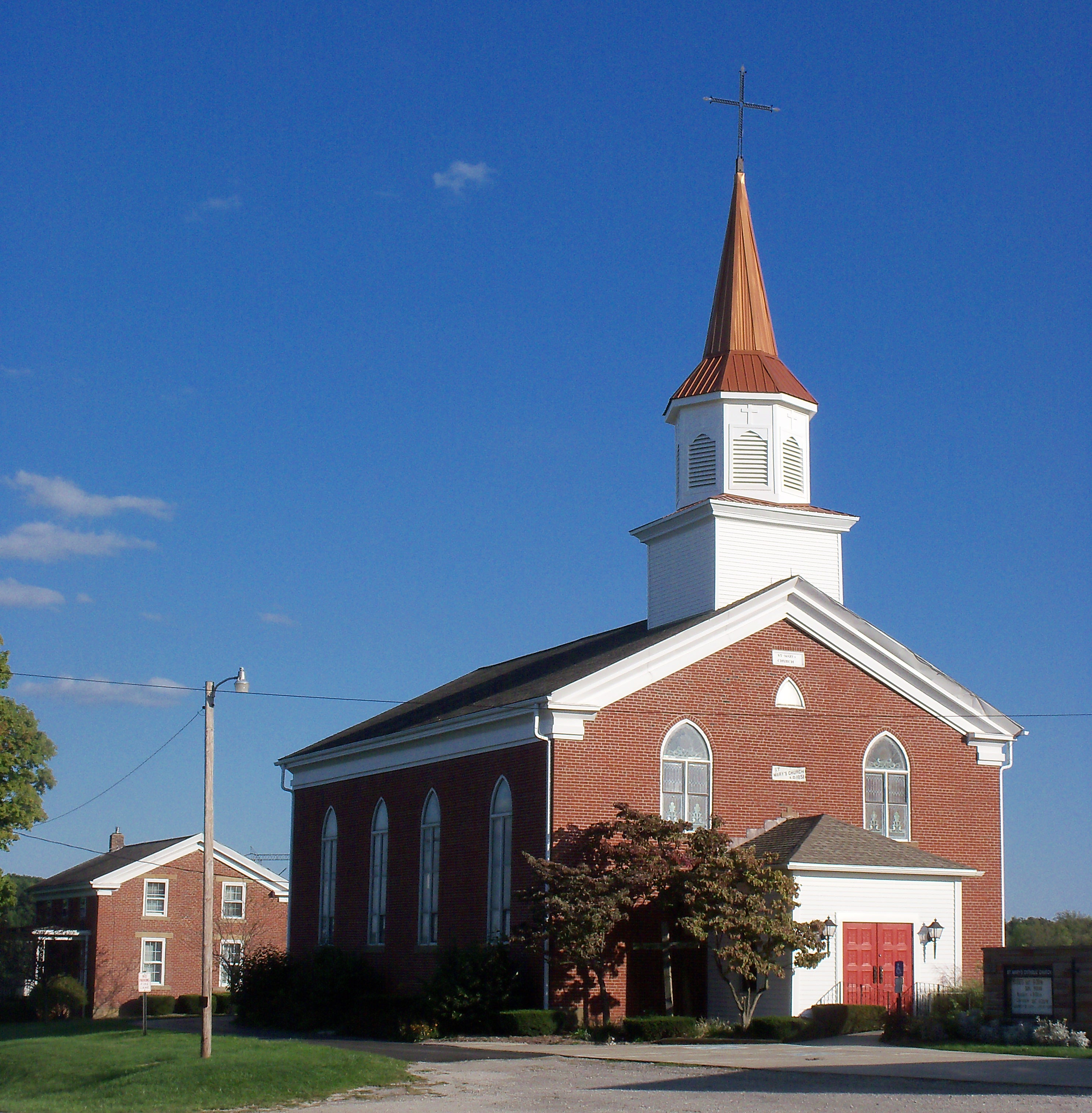
- St. Mary’s of Morges

- Location within Ohio Location within the United States
- Nearest city: Waynesburg, Ohio
- Coordinates: 40°38′4″N 81°14′33″W
- Built: 1851
- NRHP reference No.: 77001047
- Added to NRHP: April 11, 1977

St. Mary of the Immaculate Conception Church, also known as St. Mary's of Morges (/ˈmɔːrdʒɛz/ MOR-jez)) is a Roman Catholic church located in the unincorporated community of Morges in Rose Township, Carroll County, Ohio, United States. A part of the Diocese of Steubenville, it was founded in 1834 and re-established in 1948; its current building was built in 1851 and renovated in 1979. The altar was crafted in Europe and shipped to the parish in the late 19th century. The stained-glass windows, donated by parishioners in the early 1900s, were also part of the 1979 restoration, which included refinishing the altar, repainting statuary and walls, and installing new pews.

The church is built of brick with a stone foundation. The bricks were manufactured on premises. In 1977, the church was listed on the National Register of Historic Places for its architectural significance, along with a related house on the same property.
