= Petersburg, Carroll County, Ohio =

Unincorporated community in Ohio, U.S.

Coordinates: 40°30′50″N 81°06′44″W

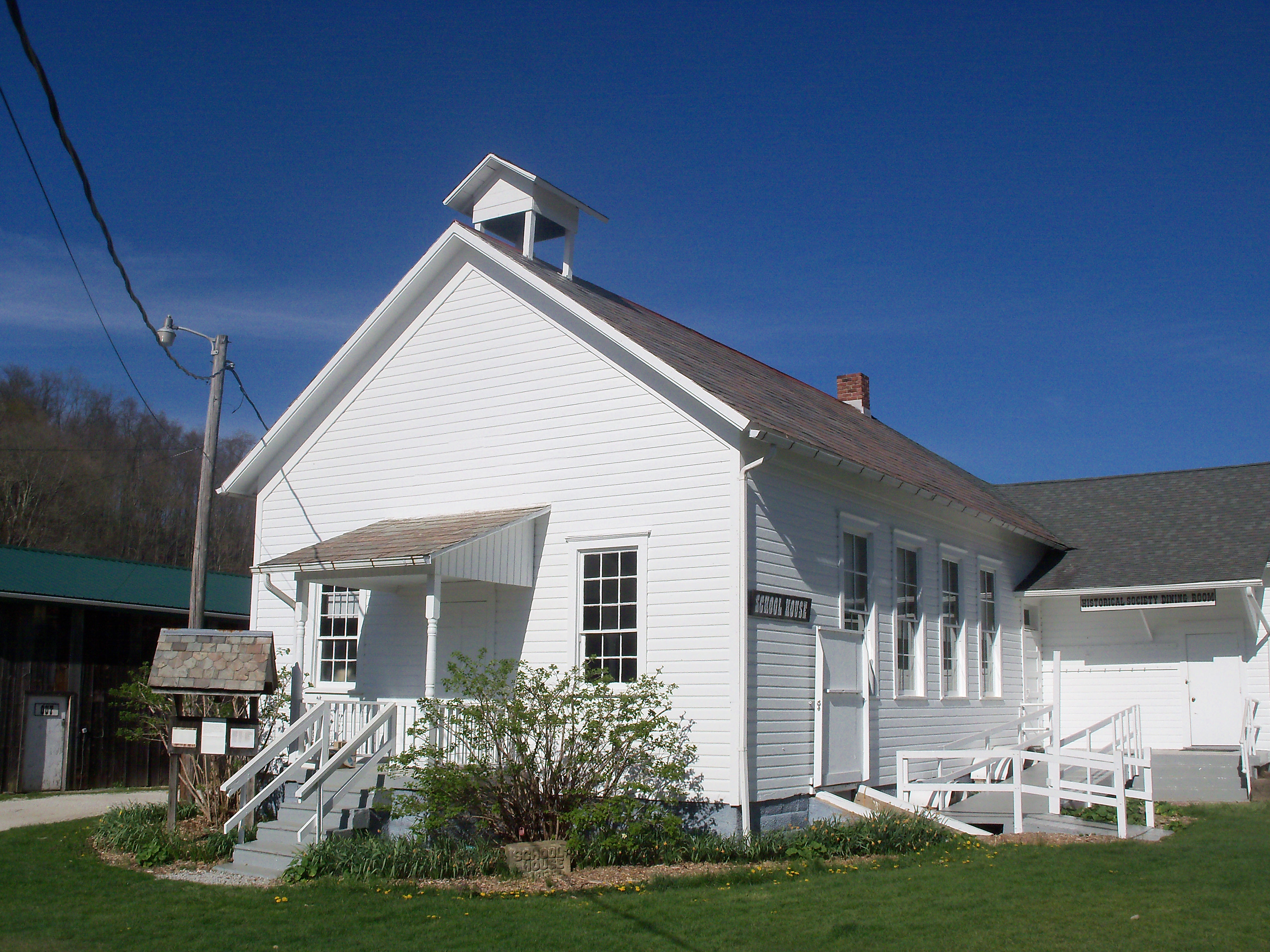
Petersburg School (1921-1939)

Petersburg, sometimes spelled "Petersburgh", is an unincorporated community in Union Township, Carroll County, Ohio, United States. The community is part of the Canton–Massillon Metropolitan Statistical Area. The community is served by the Carrollton post office, ZIP code 44615. It is located on the North Fork McGuire Creek and State Route 332.

== History ==
The community was platted September 23, 1867, by Joseph Ton and Cornelius Bracken, and had a post office called Algonquin. The creek location led to the establishment of the Petersburg Mill, also known as the Algonquin Mill, which operated on waterpower from 1826 to 1880, and on steam power 1880 to 1938, and which, on November 20, 1970 was added to the National Register of Historic Places. The Carroll County Historical Society puts on an annual festival on an autumn weekend called the Algonquin Mill Festival at the site.

== Education ==
Students attend the Carrollton Exempted Village School District.
