= Vince Costello =

American football player (1932–2019)

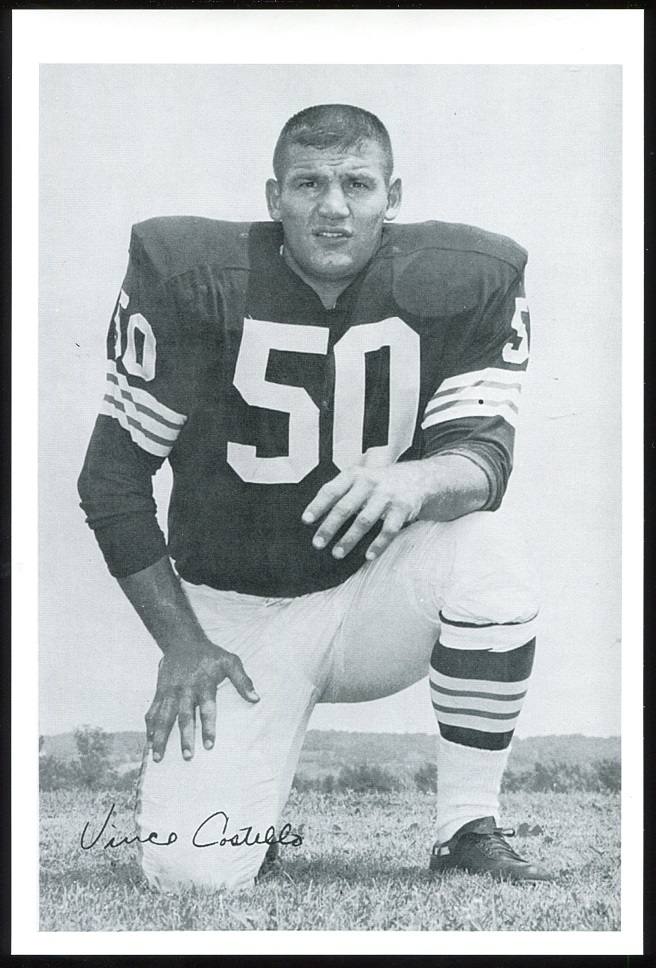
- 1961 photo of Costello

No. 50, 57
- Position: Linebacker

Personal information
- Born: April 8, 1932; Dellroy, Ohio, U.S.
- Died: June 22, 2019 (aged 87); Overland Park, Kansas, U.S.
- Listed height: 6 ft 0 in (1.83 m)
- Listed weight: 230 lb (104 kg)

Career information
- High school: Magnolia (OH)
- College: Ohio
- NFL draft: 1957: undrafted

Career history

Playing
- Cleveland Browns (1957–1966); New York Giants (1967–1968)

Coaching
- Cincinnati Bengals (1969-1973) Linebackers; Miami Dolphins (1974) Defensive coordinator; Kansas City Chiefs (1975–1976) Defensive coordinator

Awards and highlights
- NFL champion (1964); First-team All-MAC (1952); Cleveland Browns legends (2007)

Career NFL statistics
- Interceptions: 22
- Interception yards: 299
- Fumble recoveries: 8
- Touchdowns: 2
- Stats at Pro Football Reference
- Coaching profile at Pro Football Reference

Vincent Costello (April 8, 1932 – June 22, 2019) was an American professional football linebacker who played 12 seasons in the National Football League (NFL) for the Cleveland Browns (1956–1966) and New York Giants (1967–1968). He later coached with Paul Brown as linebackers coach for the Cincinnati Bengals (1969–1973); Miami Dolphins (1974) and the Kansas City Chiefs (until his retirement).

== Biography ==
Costello graduated from Magnolia High School in 1949.

Costello lived in Kansas City, Missouri, where he owned a company that makes and designs various sports collectibles, including a line exclusively designed for the Pro Football Hall of Fame. His store was called Vince Costello's Collectibles.

In 2012, The Plain Dealer named Costello the 56th best player in Browns history.

He died in Overland Park, Kansas, on June 23, 2019
