= Bowerston, Ohio =

- Village
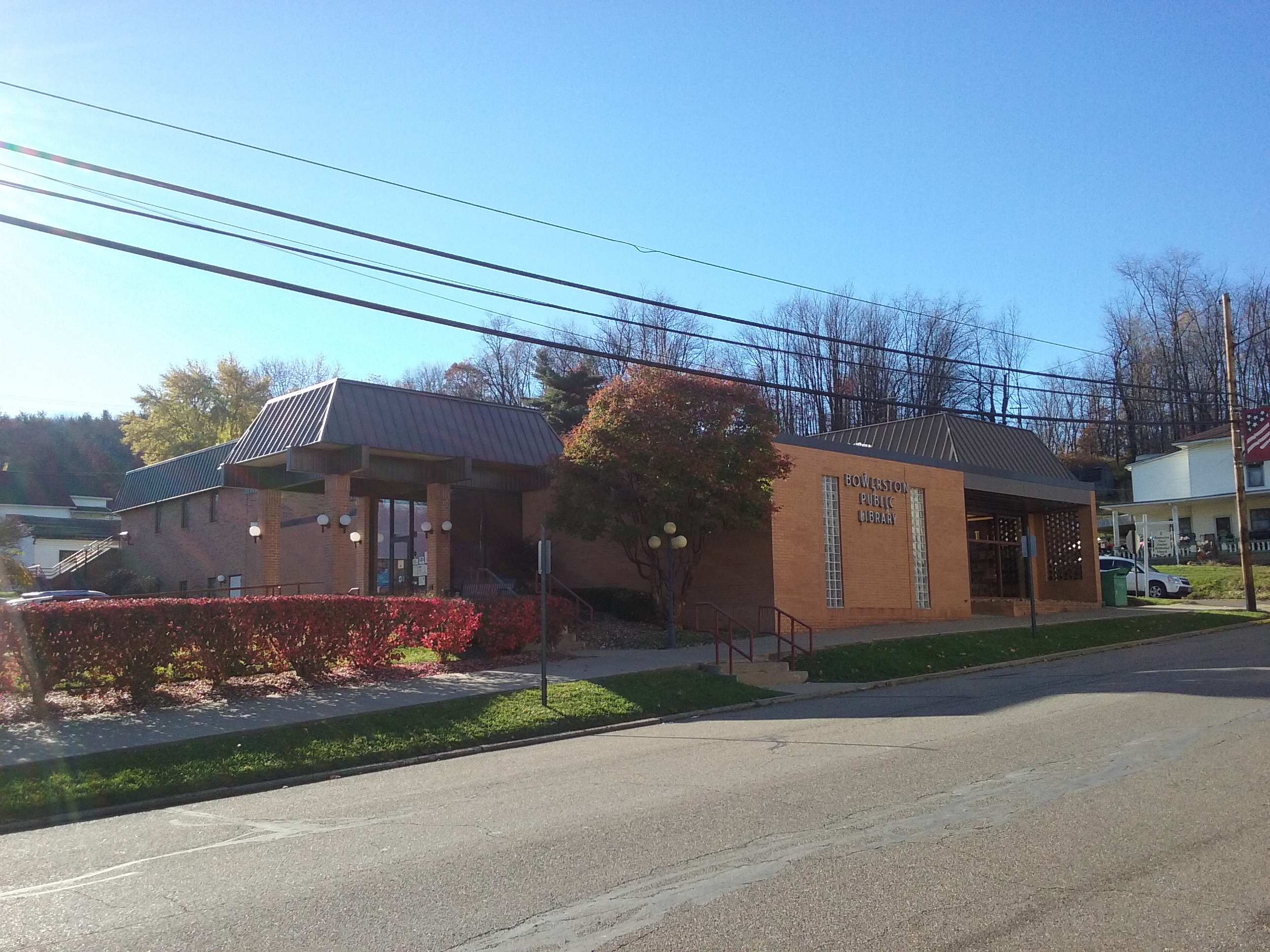
- Bowerston Public Library

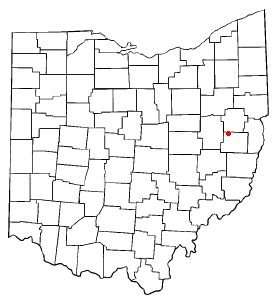
- Location of Bowerston, Ohio

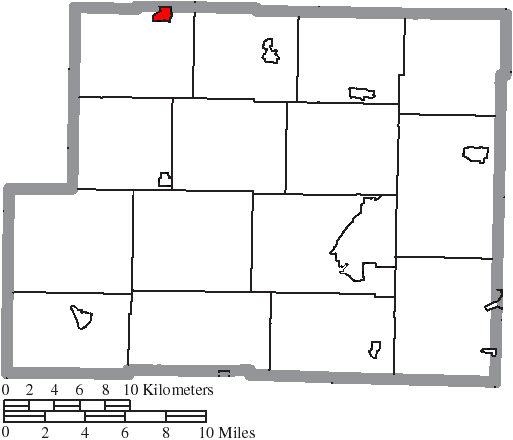
- Location of Bowerston in Harrison County
- Coordinates: 40°25′38″N 81°11′15″W
- Country: United States
- State: Ohio
- County: Harrison
- Township: Monroe
- Founded: August 21, 1851
- Incorporated: April 2, 1883

Area
  - Total: 0.51 sq mi (1.31 km^{2})
  - Land: 0.51 sq mi (1.31 km^{2})
  - Water: 0 sq mi (0.00 km^{2})
- Elevation: 932 ft (284 m)

Population (2020)
  - Total: 356
  - Estimate (2023): 349
  - Density: 703.0/sq mi (271.43/km^{2})
- Time zone: UTC-5 (Eastern (EST))
  - Summer (DST): UTC-4 (EDT)
- ZIP code: 44695
- Area code: 740
- FIPS code: 39-07916
- GNIS feature ID: 2398156
- Website: villageofbowerston.org

Bowerston is a village in Monroe Township, Harrison County, Ohio, United States. The population was 356 at the 2020 census.

== History ==
The village of Bowerston was settled in the early 19th century by Barnhard Bower and his brother John. When they first moved to the area, two mills were already built on the south side of Conotton Creek. One mill was a sawmill, the other a gristmill, and in 1804, the Bower brothers began to rebuild the mills. In 1816, the settlement called Bower's Mills was laid out and later it was called Bowersville and finally Bowerston. Bowerston was platted by David Bower, Henry Hoover, and Nathaniel Bower on August 21, 1851, and was filed in court August 2, 1852. The village was incorporated April 2, 1883.

== Geography ==
According to the United States Census Bureau, the village has a total area of 0.51 square miles (1.32 km^{2}), all land.

== Demographics ==
Historical population
Census	Pop.	Note	%±
1880	320		—
1900	526		—
1910	514		−2.3%
1920	500		−2.7%
1930	440		−12.0%
1940	447		1.6%
1950	522		16.8%
1960	463		−11.3%
1970	479		3.5%
1980	487		1.7%
1990	343		−29.6%
2000	414		20.7%
2010	398		−3.9%
2020	356		−10.6%
2023 (est.)	349	▼	−2.0%
U.S. Decennial Census

=== 2010 census ===
As of the census of 2010, there were 398 people, 156 households, and 92 families living in the village. The population density was 780.4 inhabitants per square mile (301.3/km^{2}). There were 179 housing units at an average density of 351.0 per square mile (135.5/km^{2}). The racial makeup of the village was 98.7% White, 0.8% African American, 0.3% Native American, and 0.3% from two or more races.

There were 156 households, of which 30.8% had children under the age of 18 living with them, 42.9% were married couples living together, 9.0% had a female householder with no husband present, 7.1% had a male householder with no wife present, and 41.0% were non-families. 37.8% of all households were made up of individuals, and 17.3% had someone living alone who was 65 years of age or older. The average household size was 2.26 and the average family size was 2.99.

The median age in the village was 41.1 years. 22.6% of residents were under the age of 18; 4.5% were between the ages of 18 and 24; 28.9% were from 25 to 44; 23.1% were from 45 to 64; and 20.9% were 65 years of age or older. The gender makeup of the village was 45.0% male and 55.0% female.

=== 2000 census ===
As of the census of 2000, there were 414 people, 145 households, and 100 families living in the village. The population density was 816.9 inhabitants per square mile (315.4/km^{2}). There were 165 housing units at an average density of 325.6 per square mile (125.7/km^{2}). The racial makeup of the village was 100.00% White.

There were 145 households, out of which 35.2% had children under the age of 18 living with them, 53.1% were married couples living together, 12.4% had a female householder with no husband present, and 31.0% were non-families. 27.6% of all households were made up of individuals, and 11.7% had someone living alone who was 65 years of age or older. The average household size was 2.50 and the average family size was 3.06.

In the village, the population was spread out, with 24.2% under the age of 18, 9.2% from 18 to 24, 23.9% from 25 to 44, 19.8% from 45 to 64, and 22.9% who were 65 years of age or older. The median age was 39 years. For every 100 females there were 84.8 males. For every 100 females age 18 and over, there were 80.5 males.

The median income for a household in the village was $35,000, and the median income for a family was $42,083. Males had a median income of $28,036 versus $16,932 for females. The per capita income for the village was $15,267. About 1.9% of families and 6.5% of the population were below the poverty line, including 5.3% of those under age 18 and 12.2% of those age 65 or over.

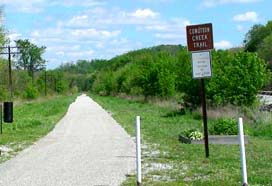
The Conotton Creek Trail begins in Bowerston, as pictured in 2006

== Arts and culture ==
Bowerston is the beginning of the multi-use rails-to-trails path, the Conotton Creek Trail, along Conotton Creek. The trail is 11.4 miles (18.3 kilometers) long. It starts at the eastern end of Bowerston, at the southeast end of Erie Street. It is paved and suitable for bicycling, roller blading, wheel chairing and walking.

== Education ==
Public education in the village of Bowerston is provided by the Conotton Valley Union Local School District. Campuses serving the village include Bowerston Elementary School (Grades K-6) and Conotton Valley High School (Grades 7–12).

The village has a lending library, the Bowerston Public Library.
