= Magnolia, Ohio =

- Village
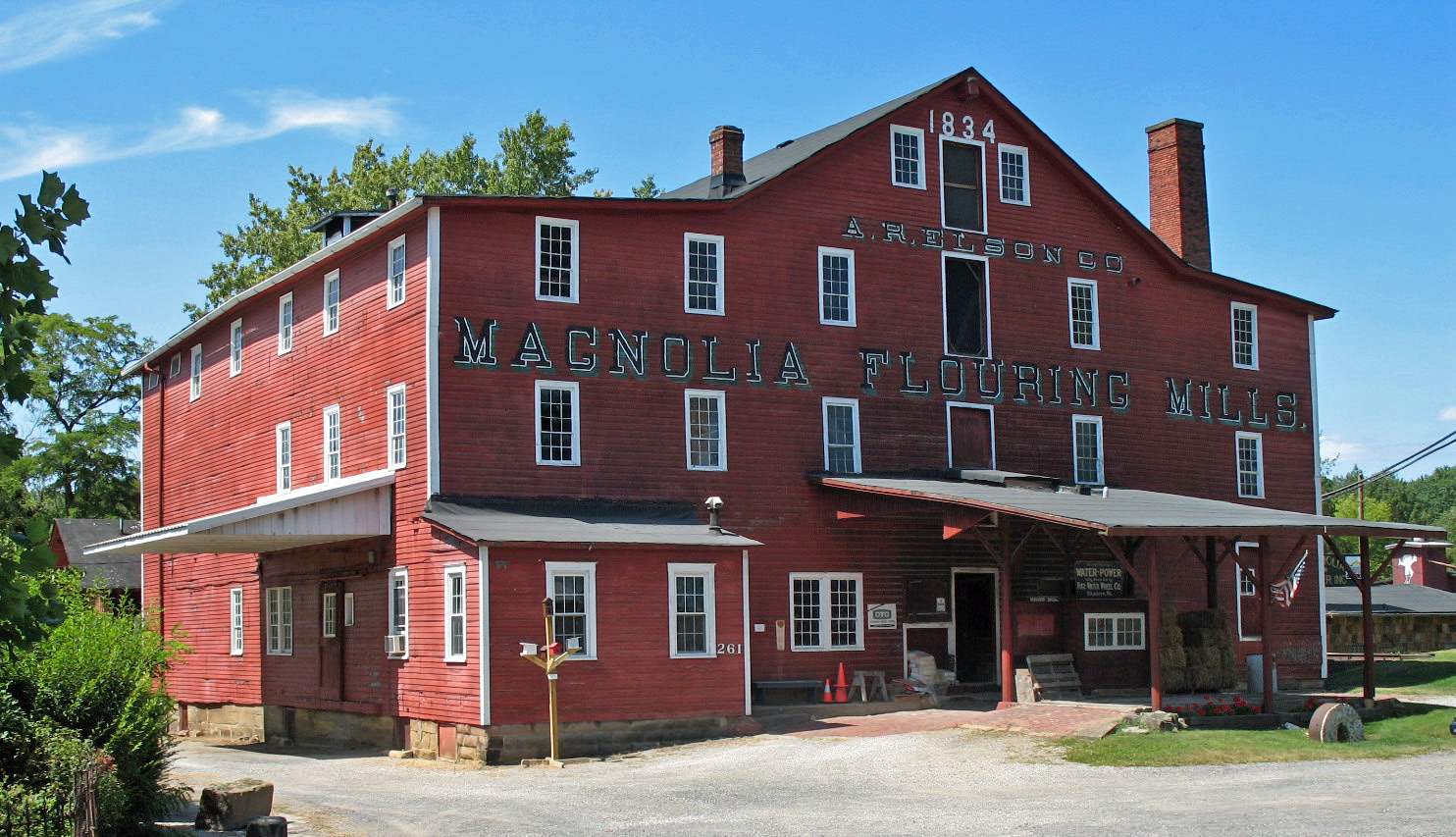
- The Magnolia Flouring Mill was established by the village's founder.

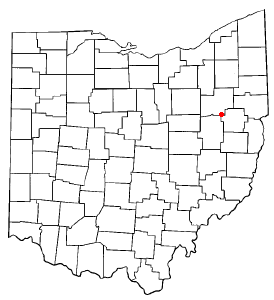
- Location of Magnolia, Ohio

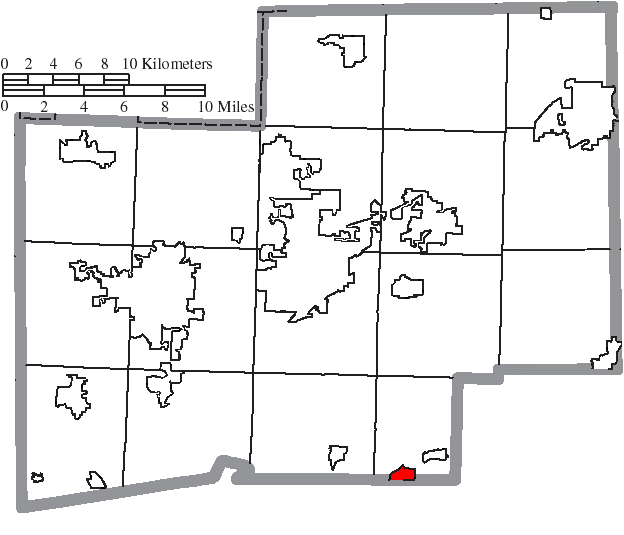
- Location of Magnolia in Stark County
- Coordinates: 40°39′11″N 81°17′34″W
- Country: United States
- State: Ohio
- Counties: Stark, Carroll
- Townships: Sandy, Rose

Government
  - Mayor: Travis Boyd

Area
  - Total: 0.80 sq mi (2.07 km^{2})
  - Land: 0.80 sq mi (2.07 km^{2})
  - Water: 0 sq mi (0.00 km^{2})
- Elevation: 988 ft (301 m)

Population (2020)
  - Total: 1,013
  - Density: 1,268.1/sq mi (489.61/km^{2})
- Time zone: UTC-5 (Eastern (EST))
  - Summer (DST): UTC-4 (EDT)
- ZIP code: 44643
- Area code: 330
- FIPS code: 39-46844
- GNIS feature ID: 2399224
- Website: villageofmagnolia.com

Magnolia is a village in Carroll and Stark counties in the U.S. state of Ohio. The population was 1,013 at the time of the 2020 census. It is part of the Canton–Massillon metropolitan area.

== History ==
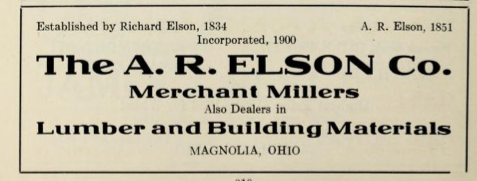
1915 advertisement for The A.R. Elson Co, established by Richard Elson, 1834

In 1834 Richard Elson and John W. Smith laid out the village of Magnolia in Sandy Township. In 1836, Isaac Miller platted the village of Downingville in Rose Township. Downingville was named after the Downes family, early pioneers that came over from Ireland and England. The towns merged and became Magnolia on February 1, 1846. The village took its name from Magnolia Mills, a local gristmill.

The Muskingum Watershed Conservancy District constructed the Magnolia Levee to protect the town from Bolivar Dam.

== Geography ==
Magnolia is located along Sandy Creek.

According to the United States Census Bureau, the village has a total area of 0.87 square miles (2.25 km^{2}), all land.

Magnolia lies at the intersection of State Routes 183 and 542.

== Demographics ==
Historical population
Census	Pop.	Note	%±
1880	121		—
1900	431		—
1910	556		29.0%
1920	605		8.8%
1930	685		13.2%
1940	819		19.6%
1950	901		10.0%
1960	935		3.8%
1970	1,064		13.8%
1980	986		−7.3%
1990	937		−5.0%
2000	931		−0.6%
2010	978		5.0%
2020	1,013		3.6%

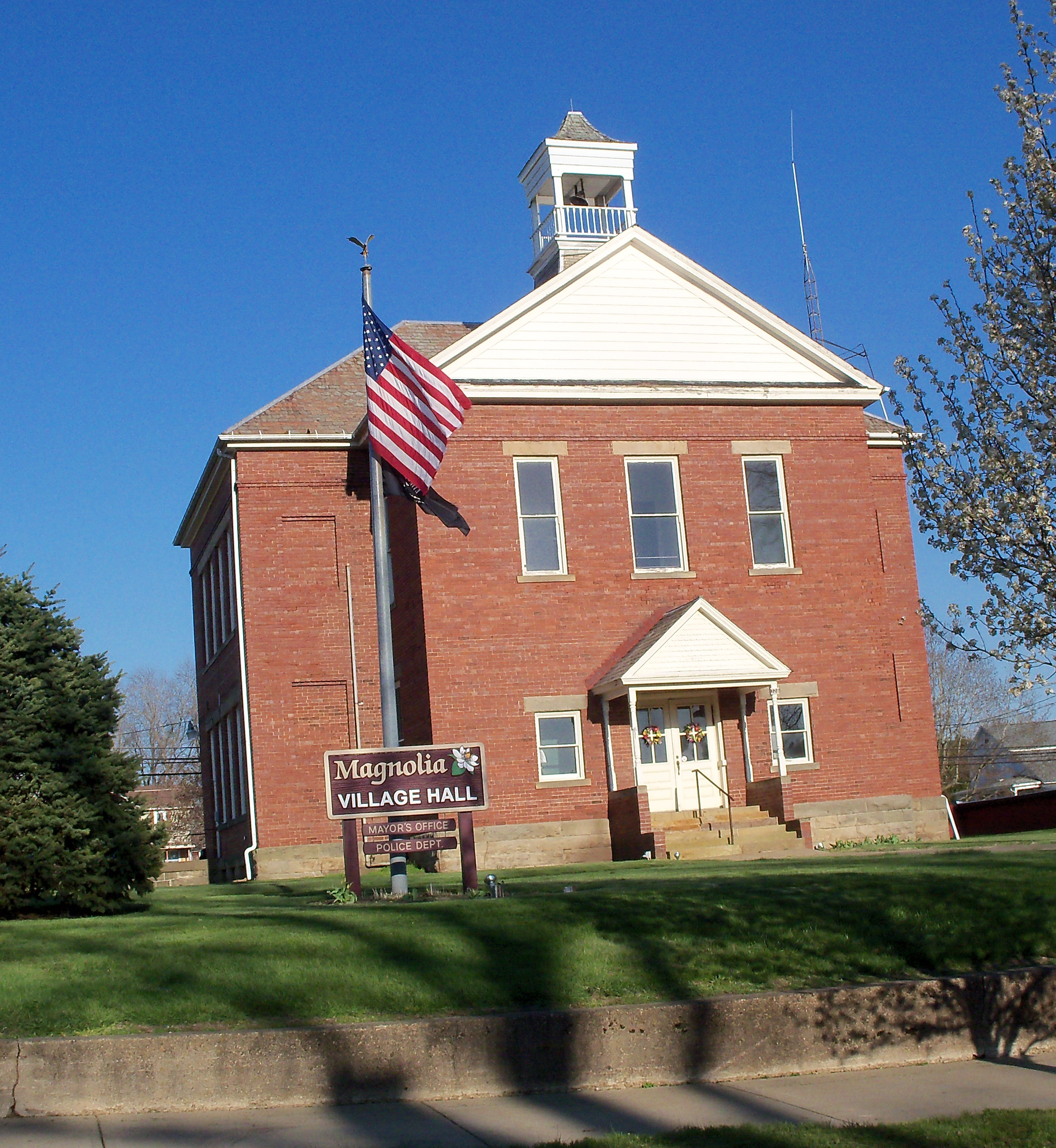
Magnolia Town Hall

=== 2010 census ===
As of the census of 2010, there were 978 people, 384 households, and 266 families living in the village. The population density was 1,124.1 inhabitants per square mile (434.0/km^{2}). There were 418 housing units at an average density of 480.5 per square mile (185.5/km^{2}). The racial makeup of the village was 97.8% White, 0.2% African American, 0.3% Native American, 0.3% Asian, 0.1% from other races, and 1.3% from two or more races. Hispanic or Latino of any race were 1.2% of the population.

There were 384 households, of which 34.1% had children under the age of 18 living with them, 55.5% were married couples living together, 8.3% had a female householder with no husband present, 5.5% had a male householder with no wife present, and 30.7% were non-families. 26.6% of all households were made up of individuals, and 12% had someone living alone who was 65 years of age or older. The average household size was 2.55 and the average family size was 3.08.

The median age in the village was 38.9 years. 26% of residents were under the age of 18; 8.4% were between the ages of 18 and 24; 24.4% were from 25 to 44; 26.4% were from 45 to 64; and 14.9% were 65 years of age or older. The gender makeup of the village was 50.5% male and 49.5% female.

=== 2000 census ===
As of the census of 2000, there were 931 people, 369 households, and 263 families living in the village. The population density was 1,046.5 inhabitants per square mile (404.1/km^{2}). There were 398 housing units at an average density of 447.4 per square mile (172.7/km^{2}). The racial makeup of the village was 99.03% White, 0.54% African American, 0.21% Native American, and 0.21% from two or more races. Hispanic or Latino of any race were 1.72% of the population.

There were 369 households, out of which 30.9% had children under the age of 18 living with them, 59.6% were married couples living together, 8.1% had a female householder with no husband present, and 28.7% were non-families. 24.9% of all households were made up of individuals, and 11.9% had someone living alone who was 65 years of age or older. The average household size was 2.52 and the average family size was 3.00.

In the village, the population was spread out, with 25.8% under the age of 18, 4.8% from 18 to 24, 30.9% from 25 to 44, 22.2% from 45 to 64, and 16.2% who were 65 years of age or older. The median age was 39 years. For every 100 females there were 100.6 males. For every 100 females age 18 and over, there were 96.3 males.

The median income for a household in the village was $39,688, and the median income for a family was $45,156. Males had a median income of $32,292 versus $20,909 for females. The per capita income for the village was $19,711. About 4.3% of families and 4.3% of the population were below the poverty line, including 3.3% of those under age 18 and 3.9% of those age 65 or over.

== Education ==
Students attend the Sandy Valley Local School District.

== Notable people ==
- Iorwith Wilbur Abel, founder and president of the United Steelworkers of America and vice-president of the AFL–CIO
- Jeff Boals, current Head Coach at Ohio University
- Vince Costello, former American football linebacker
- John Dagenhard, Major League Baseball pitcher
- Thomas Dillon, Serial killer
- Joe R. Hastings, United States Army soldier, recipient of the Medal of Honor for his actions in World War II
- John J. Whitacre, US Congressman
