= Godfrey Haga =

American politician (1745–1825)

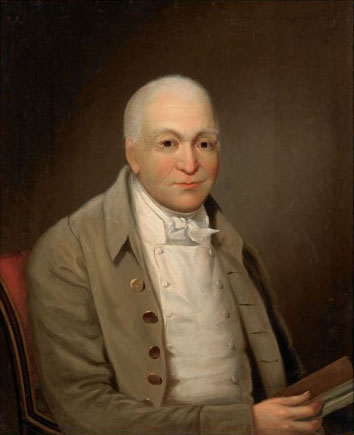

Godfrey Haga (born in Isingen, (Note: Now the village of Ising in the French department of Moselle. See German exonyms (Moselle).) Duchy of Württemberg, 30 November 1745; died in Philadelphia, Pennsylvania, 5 February 1825) was a United States merchant, politician and philanthropist.

== Biography ==
After emigrating to the United States, he settled in Philadelphia, where he became a merchant, and was connected with the principal charitable and mercantile institutions of the city. He was a member of the Philadelphia City Council in 1797–1800, and of the Pennsylvania Legislature in 1800–01. He was a director of the Insurance Company of North America, 1800–1825. He bequeathed an estate valued at $350,000 to charitable purposes. Notably, he sold 5,500 acres of land to the Christian sect, The Separatist Society, led by John Baumeler, that had emigrated from Wurtemberg to Philadelphia. The land, in northeastern Ohio, in present-day Tuscarawas County, would later become the village of Zoar, a communistic society ( eine Guter Gemeinschaft / a community of goods).
