= Pike Township, Stark County, Ohio =

Township in Ohio, US

- Township
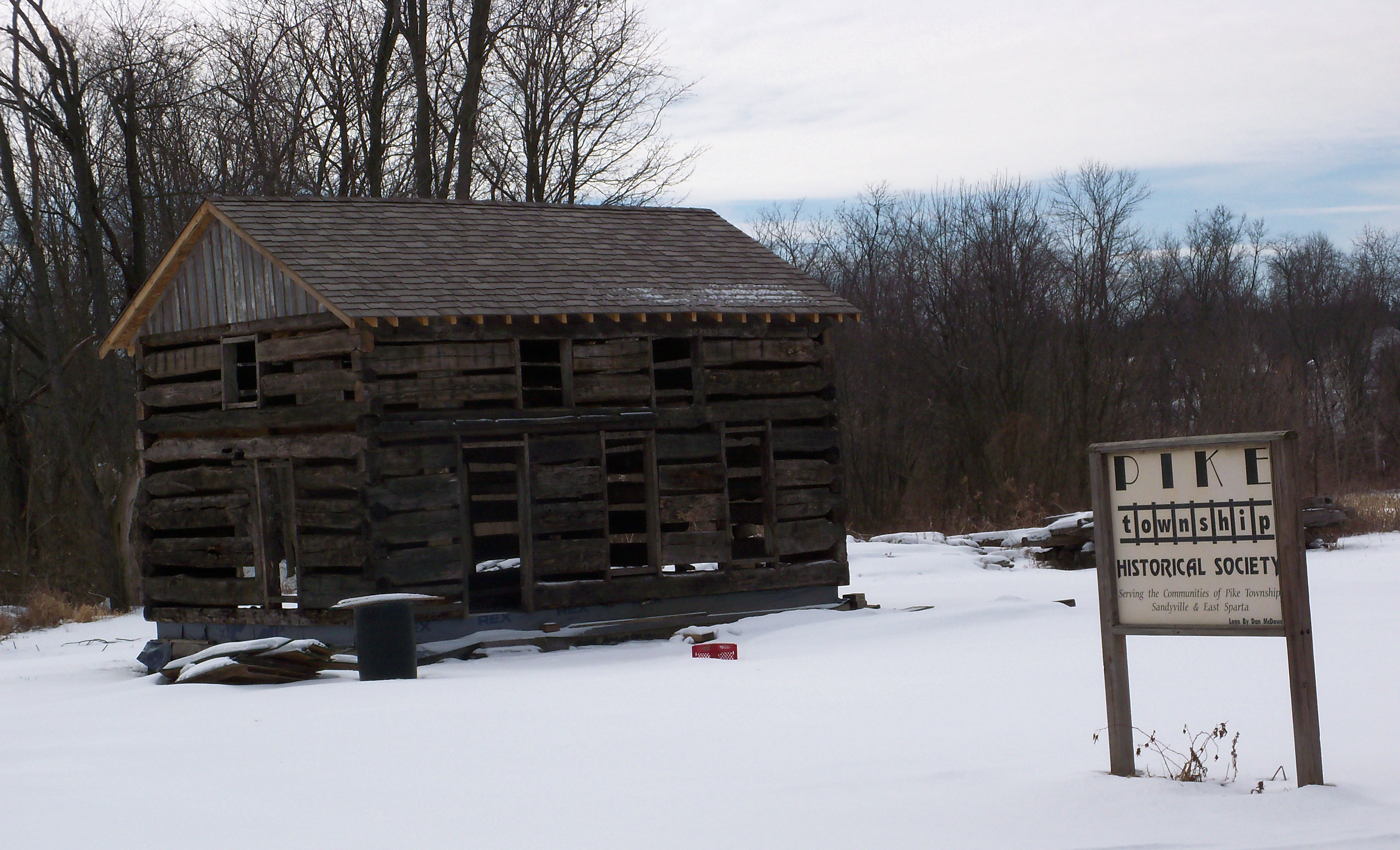
- Log building

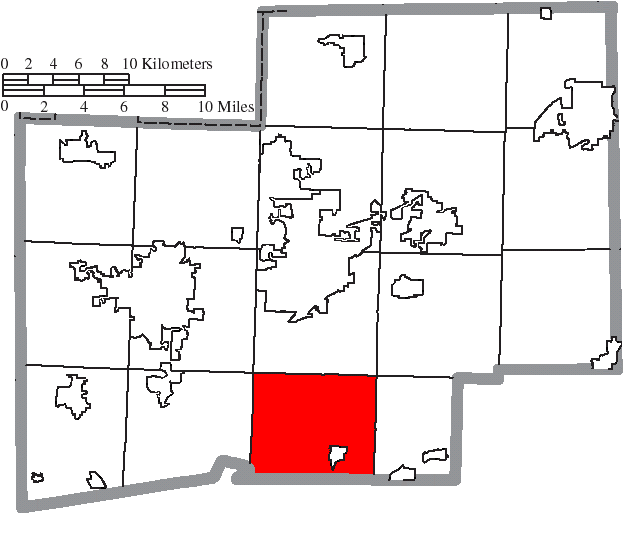
- Location of Pike Township in Stark County
- Coordinates: 40°41′19″N 81°21′40″W
- Country: United States
- State: Ohio
- County: Stark

Area
  - Total: 31.9 sq mi (82.5 km^{2})
  - Land: 31.8 sq mi (82.4 km^{2})
  - Water: 0.039 sq mi (0.1 km^{2})
- Elevation: 1,119 ft (341 m)

Population (2020)
  - Total: 3,818
  - Density: 120/sq mi (46.3/km^{2})
- Time zone: UTC-5 (Eastern (EST))
  - Summer (DST): UTC-4 (EDT)
- FIPS code: 39-62694
- GNIS feature ID: 1086987
- Website: https://piketownship.net/

Pike Township is one of the seventeen townships of Stark County, Ohio, United States. The 2020 census found 3,818 people in the township, 3,069 of whom lived in the unincorporated portions of the township.

== Geography ==
Located in the southern part of the county, it borders the following townships:

- Canton Township - north
- Osnaburg Township - northeast corner
- Sandy Township - east
- Rose Township, Carroll County - southeast corner
- Sandy Township, Tuscarawas County - south
- Lawrence Township, Tuscarawas County - southwest
- Bethlehem Township - west
- Perry Township - northwest corner

The village of East Sparta is located in southeastern Pike Township.

== Name and history ==
In 1806, George Young and his wife Catherine moved to what is now known as East Sparta, becoming the first permanent settlers of Pike Township. However, there are inconstancies in government and family records that instead put him in Pike in 1800, which would make him the first settler of Stark County.

In 1815, the township was named after Zebulon Pike. It is one of eight Pike Townships statewide.

== Government ==
Historical population
Census	Pop.	Note	%±
1820	883		—
1830	1,273		44.2%
1840	1,409		10.7%
1850	1,447		2.7%
1860	1,398		−3.4%
1870	1,333		−4.6%
1880	1,514		13.6%
1890	1,604		5.9%
1900	1,491		−7.0%
1910	1,272		−14.7%
1920	1,584		24.5%
1930	2,043		29.0%
1940	2,272		11.2%
1950	2,828		24.5%
1960	3,523		24.6%
1970	4,027		14.3%
1990	3,931		—
2000	4,088		4.0%
2010	3,961		−3.1%
2020	3,818		−3.6%

The township is governed by a three-member board of trustees, who are elected in November of odd-numbered years to a four-year term beginning on the following January 1. Two are elected in the year after the presidential election and one is elected in the year before it. There is also an elected township fiscal officer, who serves a four-year term beginning on April 1 of the year after the election, which is held in November of the year before the presidential election. Vacancies in the fiscal officership or on the board of trustees are filled by the remaining trustees.
