= Sandy Township, Stark County, Ohio =

Township in Ohio, US

- Township
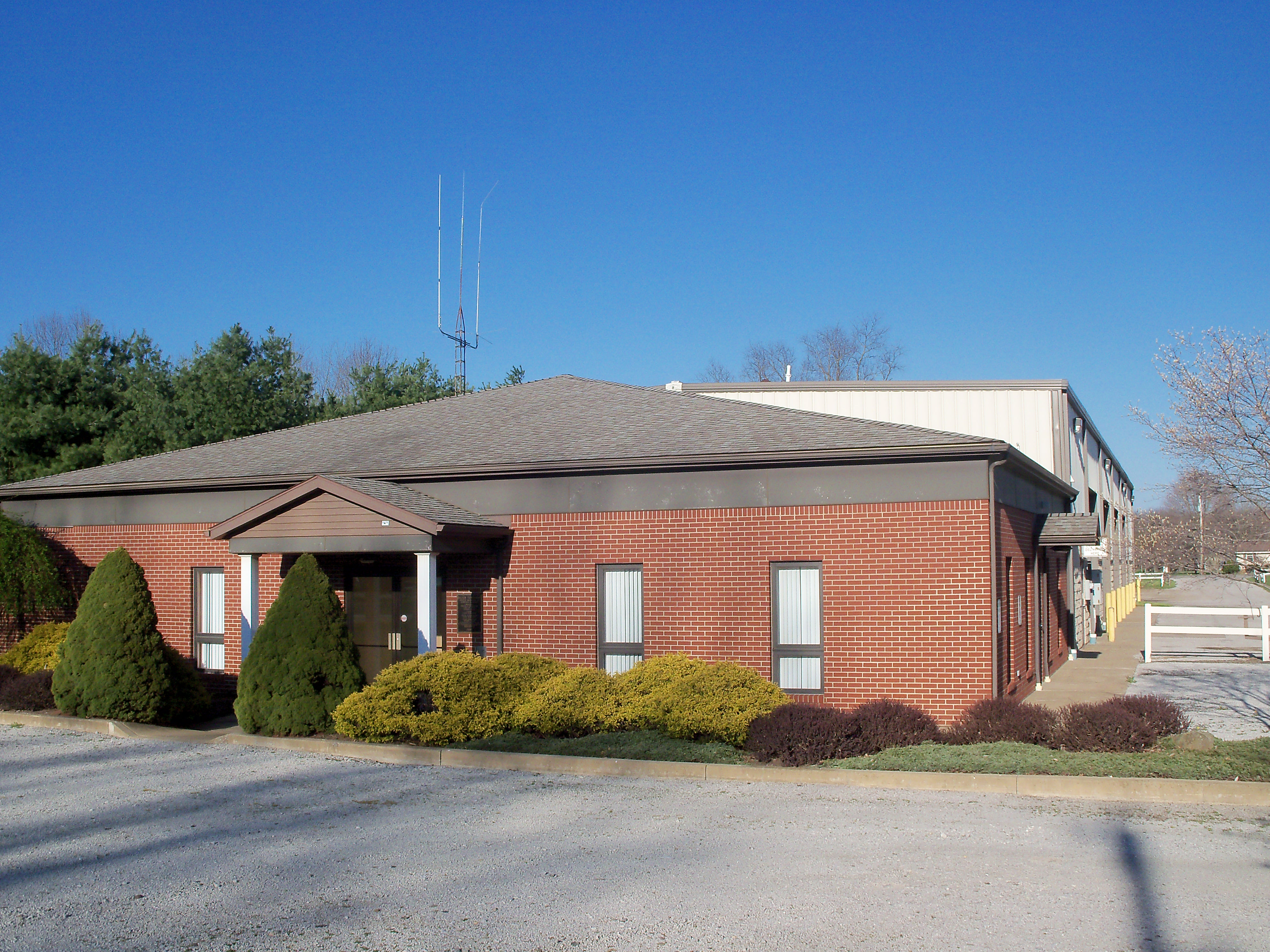
- Town Hall and Service Garage

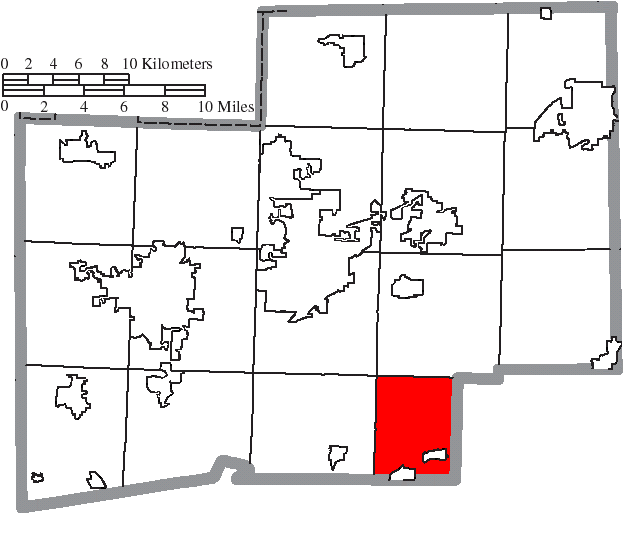
- Location of Sandy Township in Stark County
- Coordinates: 40°40′26″N 81°16′11″W
- Country: United States
- State: Ohio
- County: Stark

Area
  - Total: 20.6 sq mi (53.3 km^{2})
  - Land: 20.6 sq mi (53.3 km^{2})
  - Water: 0 sq mi (0.0 km^{2})
- Elevation: 971 ft (296 m)

Population (2020)
  - Total: 3,561
  - Density: 173/sq mi (66.8/km^{2})
- Time zone: UTC-5 (Eastern (EST))
  - Summer (DST): UTC-4 (EDT)
- FIPS code: 39-70436
- GNIS feature ID: 1086989
- Website: https://sandytwp.com/

Sandy Township is one of the seventeen townships of Stark County, Ohio, United States. The 2020 census found 3,561 people in the township, 1,899 of whom lived in the unincorporated portions of the township.

== Geography ==
Located in the southern part of the county, it borders the following townships:

- Osnaburg Township – north
- Brown Township, Carroll County – east
- Rose Township, Carroll County – south
- Sandy Township, Tuscarawas County – southwest corner
- Pike Township – west
- Canton Township – northwest corner

Two villages are located in Sandy Township: part of Magnolia in the south, and Waynesburg in the southeast.

== Name and history ==
Statewide, the only other Sandy Township is located in Tuscarawas County. It is named for the predominantly sandy soils of the area.

On March 16, 1809, the Stark County commissioners divided the county into townships. "Sandy Township (election at the residence of Isaac Van Meter), to include the fifteenth and sixteenth townships in the sixth range and sixteenth and seventeenth townships in the seventh range." Brown Township was formed in 1815, Harrison Township in 1817, and Rose Township in 1818, leaving Sandy Township as Survey township 17 of range 7. With the formation of Carroll County in 1833, two miles off the east side of the township were annexed to Brown Township, leaving a four mile wide township.

In 1833, Sandy Township contained two gristmills, four saw mills, one fulling mill, and three stores.

== Government ==
The township is governed by a three-member board of trustees, who are elected in November of odd-numbered years to a four-year term beginning on the following January 1. Two are elected in the year after the presidential election and one is elected in the year before it. There is also an elected township fiscal officer, who serves a four-year term beginning on April 1 of the year after the election, which is held in November of the year before the presidential election. Vacancies in the fiscal officership or on the board of trustees are filled by the remaining trustees.
