= Rose Township, Carroll County, Ohio =

Township in Ohio, US

- Township
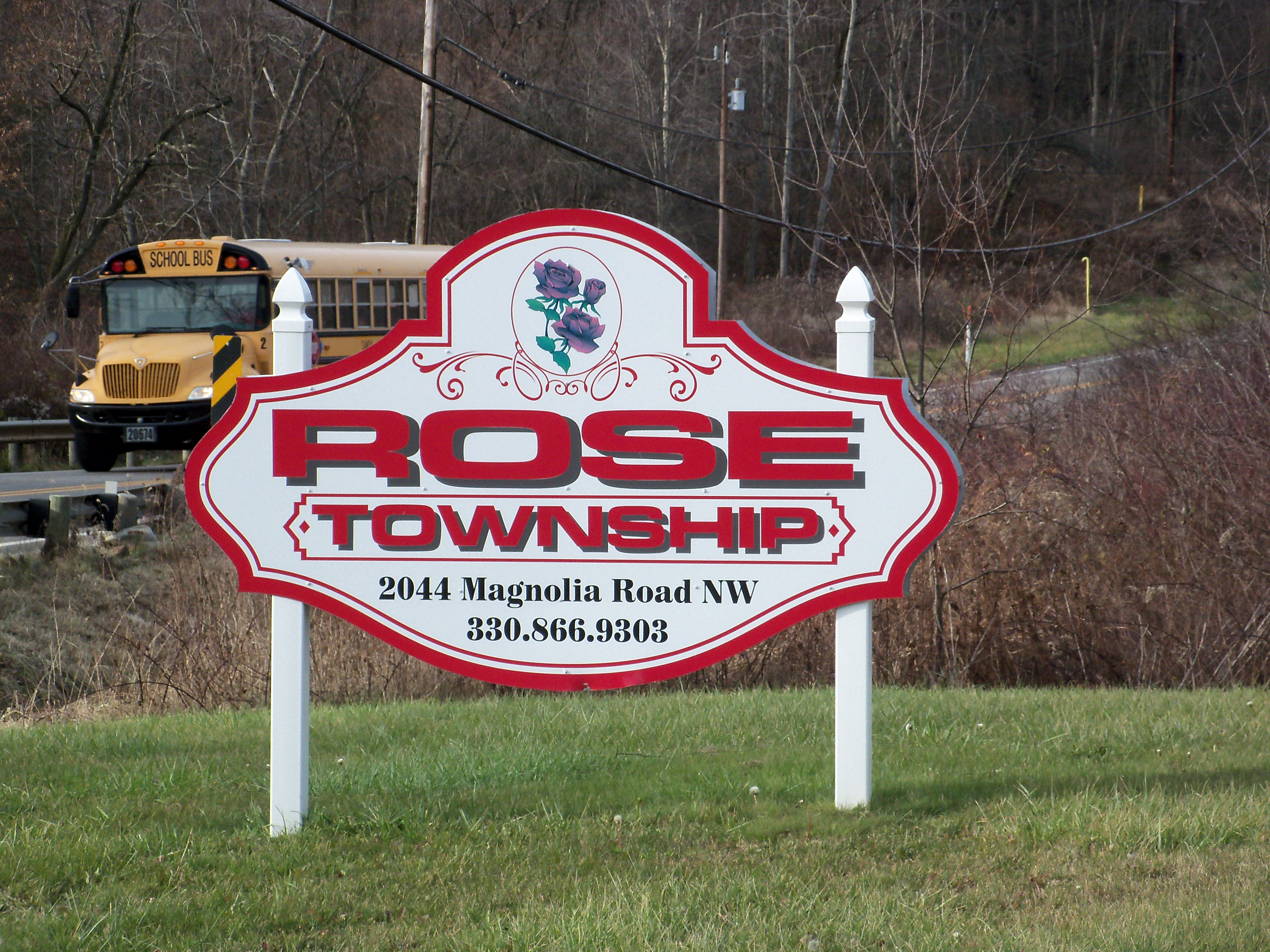
- Sign at township garage

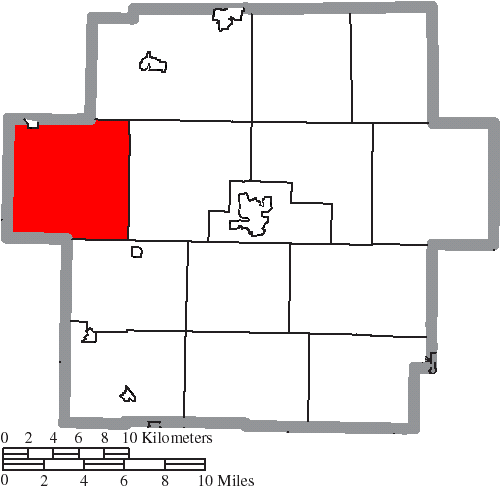
- Location of Rose Township in Carroll County
- Coordinates: 40°36′56″N 81°15′57″W
- Country: United States
- State: Ohio
- County: Carroll

Area
  - Total: 35.51 sq mi (91.98 km^{2})
  - Land: 35.49 sq mi (91.93 km^{2})
  - Water: 0.019 sq mi (0.05 km^{2})
- Elevation: 994 ft (303 m)

Population (2020)
  - Total: 1,444
  - Density: 41/sq mi (15.7/km^{2})
- Time zone: UTC-5 (Eastern (EST))
  - Summer (DST): UTC-4 (EDT)
- Area code: 330
- FIPS code: 39-68420
- GNIS feature ID: 1085835
- Website: http://rosetownshipohio.com/

Rose Township is one of the fourteen townships of Carroll County, Ohio, United States. As of the 2020 census, the population was 1,444, 1,168 of whom lived in the unincorporated portions of the township.

== Geography ==
Located in the western part of the county, it borders the following townships:

- Sandy Township, Stark County - north
- Brown Township - northeast
- Harrison Township - east
- Monroe Township - southeast
- Warren Township, Tuscarawas County - southwest
- Sandy Township, Tuscarawas County - west
- Pike Township, Stark County - northwest corner

Rose Township is the northwesternmost township of the Old Seven Ranges of the Ohio Lands. The Geographer's line along the north boundary of the township was completed on August 10, 1786, marked by the Seven Ranges Terminus, which is now on the National Register of Historic Places.

Part of the village of Magnolia is located in northwestern Rose Township.

== Name and history ==
Named after the many wild roses growing in the area, it is the only Rose Township statewide.

In 1818, Rose Township was formed from a part of Sandy Township in Stark County. Before the formation of Carroll County, it was a part of Stark County.

== Government ==
Historical population
Census	Pop.	Note	%±
1820	380		—
1830	978		157.4%
1840	1,593		62.9%
1850	1,537		−3.5%
1860	1,286		−16.3%
1870	1,106		−14.0%
1880	1,195		8.0%
1890	1,196		0.1%
1900	1,638		37.0%
1910	1,218		−25.6%
1920	1,314		7.9%
1930	1,072		−18.4%
1940	1,234		15.1%
1950	1,230		−0.3%
1960	1,373		11.6%
1970	1,181		−14.0%
1980	1,289		9.1%
1990	1,384		7.4%
2000	1,603		15.8%
2010	1,537		−4.1%
2020	1,444		−6.1%

The township is governed by a three-member board of trustees, who are elected in November of odd-numbered years to a four-year term beginning on the following January 1. Two are elected in the year after the presidential election and one is elected in the year before it. There is also an elected township fiscal officer, who serves a four-year term beginning on April 1 of the year after the election, which is held in November of the year before the presidential election. Vacancies in the fiscal officership or on the board of trustees are filled by the remaining trustees.

The current office holders and end of their terms are:

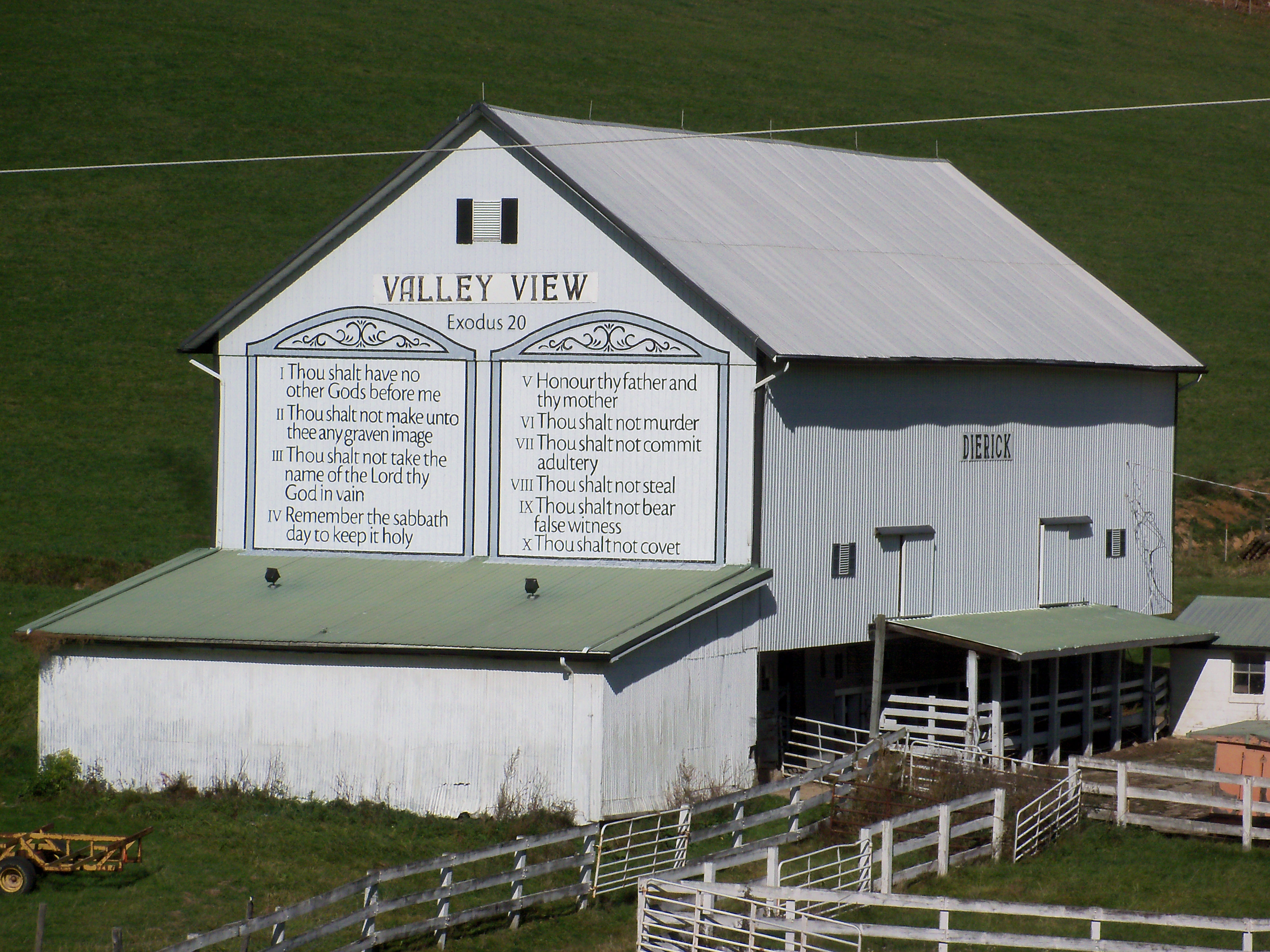
This township has some decoratively painted barns

Trustees:

- Jonathan W. J. Ward - Term ending December 31, 2021
- John Joe Little - Term ending December 31, 2021
- Joe Owens - Term ending December 31, 2023

Fiscal Officer (Clerk):

- Bruce W. Downes - Term ending March 31, 2024

Rose Township has one voting precinct. The polling place is the social hall at St. Mary's of Morges.

=== Cemeteries ===
The township maintains five cemeteries.

=== Roads ===
The township maintains 33 miles of roads, maintained by two appointed employees, Thomas Witts, and Richard Rennie.

== Education ==
Students attend the Carrollton Exempted Village School District in the eastern part and Sandy Valley Local School District in the center and west part.

From the mid 19th to early 20th century the rural areas were served by schools numbered 1 to 9.
