= Sandy Valley Local School District =

School district in Ohio, United States

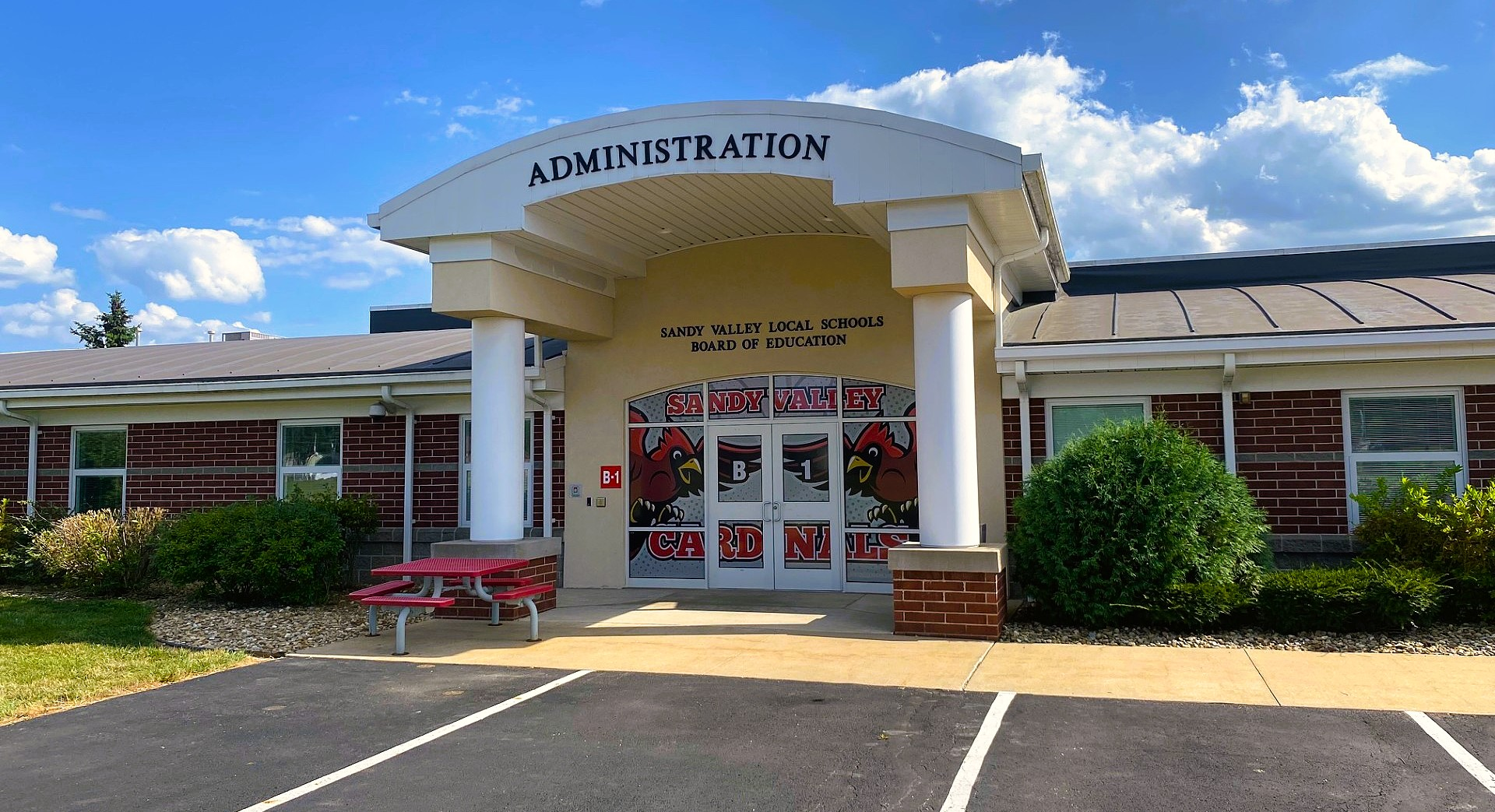
- Sandy Valley Local Schools Board of Education

Address
- 5362 State Route 183 Northeast Magnolia, Ohio, 44643; United States

District information
- Type: Public
- Grades: PK–12
- Schools: 3
- NCES District ID: 3904994

Students and staff
- Students: 1,254 (2024–2025)
- Teachers: 76.00 (on an FTE basis) (2024–2025)
- Staff: 216.82 (on an FTE basis) (2024–2025)
- Student–teacher ratio: 16.50 (2024–2025)

Other information
- Website: www.sandyvalleylocal.org

Sandy Valley Local Schools is a school district located in Stark County, Ohio, United States. The district includes the Sandy Valley High School.
