= Sandy Township, Tuscarawas County, Ohio =

Township in Ohio, US

- Township
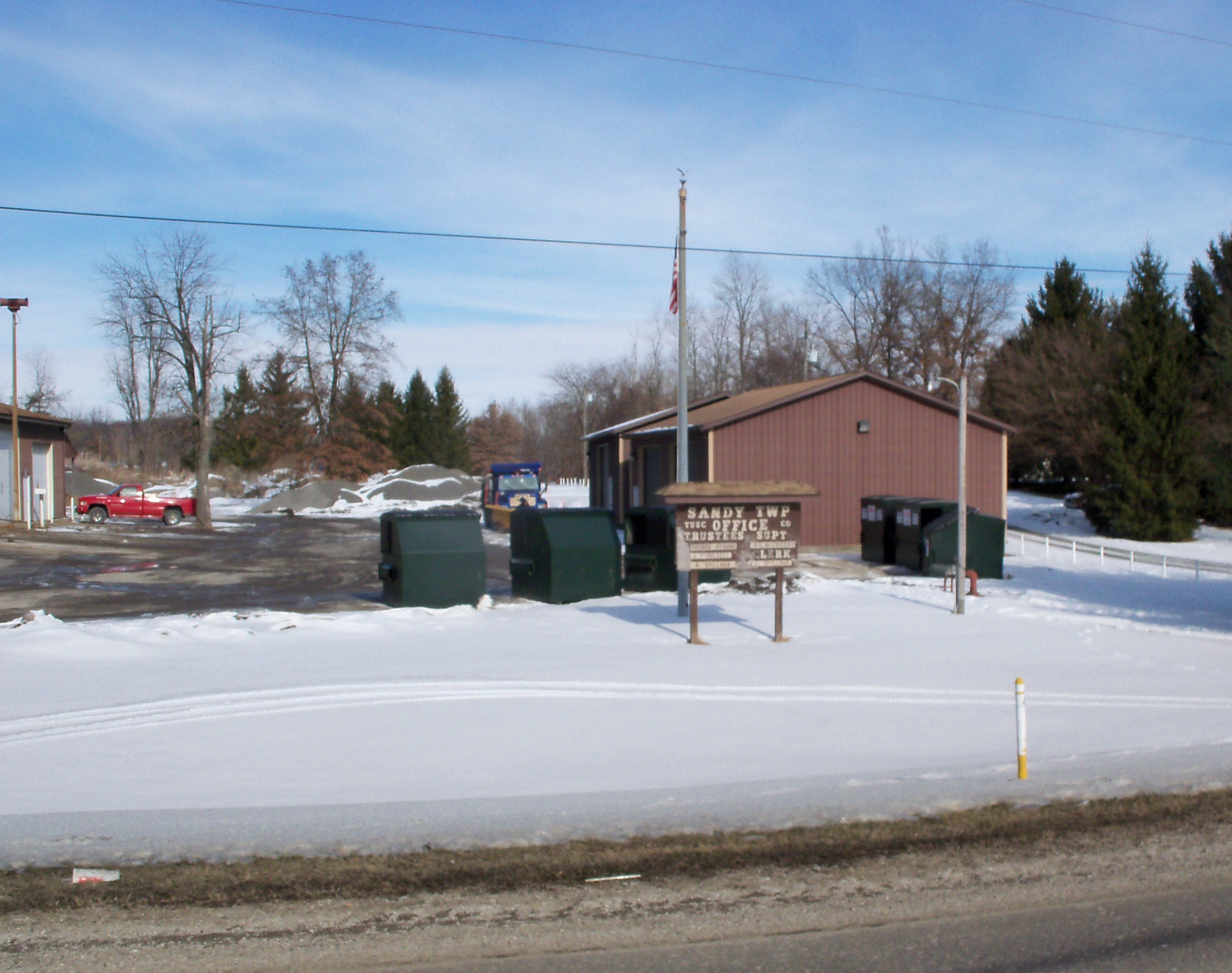
- Township garage

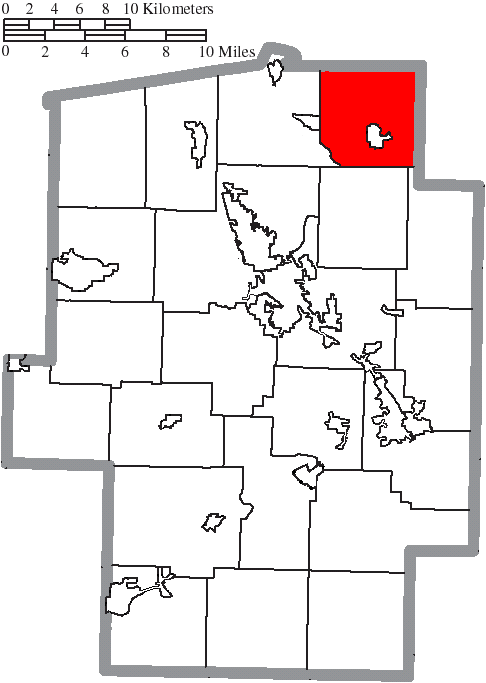
- Location of Sandy Township in Tuscarawas County
- Coordinates: 40°37′1″N 81°21′42″W
- Country: United States
- State: Ohio
- County: Tuscarawas

Government

Area
  - Total: 24.2 sq mi (62.6 km^{2})
  - Land: 24.2 sq mi (62.6 km^{2})
  - Water: 0 sq mi (0.0 km^{2})
- Elevation: 1,138 ft (347 m)

Population (2020)
  - Total: 2,946
  - Density: 122/sq mi (47.1/km^{2})
- Time zone: UTC-5 (Eastern (EST))
  - Summer (DST): UTC-4 (EDT)
- FIPS code: 39-70443
- GNIS feature ID: 1087065
- Website: https://sandytownship.us/

Sandy Township is one of the twenty-two townships of Tuscarawas County, Ohio, United States. The 2020 census found 2,946 people in the township.

== Geography ==
Located in the northeastern corner of the county, it borders the following townships:

- Pike Township, Stark County - north
- Sandy Township, Stark County - northeast corner
- Rose Township, Carroll County - east
- Warren Township - southeast
- Fairfield Township - south
- Lawrence Township - west

The village of Mineral City is located in central Sandy Township, and the census-designated place of Sandyville lies in the northern part of the township.

== Name and history ==
Statewide, the only other Sandy Township is located in Stark County.

== Government ==
The township is governed by a three-member board of trustees, who are elected in November of odd-numbered years to a four-year term beginning on the following January 1. Two are elected in the year after the presidential election and one is elected in the year before it. There is also an elected township fiscal officer, who serves a four-year term beginning on April 1 of the year after the election, which is held in November of the year before the presidential election. Vacancies in the fiscal officership or on the board of trustees are filled by the remaining trustees.
