= National Register of Historic Places listings in Stark County, Ohio =

Location of Stark County in Ohio

This is a list of the National Register of Historic Places listings in Stark County, Ohio.

This is intended to be a complete list of the properties and districts on the National Register of Historic Places in Stark County, Ohio, United States. Latitude and longitude coordinates are provided for many National Register properties and districts; these locations may be seen together in an online map.

There are 91 properties and districts listed on the National Register in the county, including 1 National Historic Landmark. Another 3 properties were once listed but have been removed.

This National Park Service list is complete through NPS recent listings posted October 30, 2026.

== Current listings ==
	Name on the Register	Image	Date listed	Location	City or town	Description
1	Alliance Bank Building	Alliance Bank Building	July 28, 1995 (#95000940)	502 E. Main St. 40°55′19″N 81°05′54″W	Alliance	
2	Jacob H. Bair House	Jacob H. Bair House	December 29, 1978 (#78002194)	North of Canton at 7225 N. Market Ave. 40°53′13″N 81°21′52″W	Plain Township	
3	Barber-Whitticar House	Barber-Whitticar House	July 15, 1982 (#82003642)	519 Cleveland Ave, SW. 40°47′45″N 81°22′41″W	Canton	
4	Bender's Restaurant-Belmont Buffet	Bender's Restaurant-Belmont Buffet	July 21, 1987 (#87001193)	137 Court Ave., SW. 40°47′53″N 81°22′35″W	Canton	
5	Bordner House	Bordner House	February 17, 1978 (#78002191)	4522 7th St., SW., west of Canton; 40°47′40″N 81°25′43″W	Perry Township	
6	Brewster Railroad YMCA/Wandle House	Brewster Railroad YMCA/Wandle House	March 7, 1985 (#85000486)	45 S. Wabash Ave. 40°42′46″N 81°35′54″W	Brewster	Railroad dormitory constructed in 1916 by the Wheeling and Lake Erie Railway (W&LE). The building now houses the Brewster-Sugarcreek Township Historical Society Museum and The Station Restaurant.
7	Canal Fulton Historic District	Canal Fulton Historic District	December 2, 1982 (#82001488)	Ohio-Erie Canal, Market, Canal, Cherry and High Sts. 40°53′13″N 81°35′42″W	Canal Fulton and Lawrence Township	
8	Canton Public Library	Canton Public Library	July 15, 1982 (#82003643)	236 3rd St., SW. 40°47′50″N 81°22′37″W	Canton	
9	City National Bank Building	City National Bank Building	July 15, 1982 (#82003644)	205 Market Ave., S. 40°47′51″N 81°22′31″W	Canton	With Saxton House, part of the First Ladies National Historic Site; also listed separately on the National Register.
10	City Savings Bank & Trust Company	City Savings Bank & Trust Company	September 2, 2016 (#16000602)	449 E. Main St. 40°55′18″N 81°05′56″W	Alliance	
11	Clearview Golf Club	Clearview Golf Club	February 16, 2001 (#01000056)	8410 Lincoln St., SE., southeast of East Canton; 40°46′19″N 81°14′51″W	Osnaburg Township	The only golf club in the United States designed, built, owned and operated by an African American (William J. Powell). Opened for business in 1948, it is still owned and operated by the Powell family.
12	George E. Cook House	George E. Cook House	May 2, 1995 (#95000498)	1435 Market Ave. N. 40°48′48″N 81°22′16″W	Canton	
13	Dewalt Building	Dewalt Building	July 15, 1982 (#82003645)	122 Market Ave., N. 40°47′57″N 81°22′30″W	Canton	
14	John and Syd Dobkins House	John and Syd Dobkins House	January 8, 2009 (#08001298)	5120 Plain Center, NE. 40°51′16″N 81°21′15″W	Canton	
15	Eagles Building-Strand Theater	Eagles Building-Strand Theater	January 25, 1997 (#96001624)	243 E. Main St. 40°55′18″N 81°06′10″W	Alliance	
16	Eagles' Temple	Eagles' Temple	July 15, 1982 (#82003646)	601 S. Market St. 40°47′41″N 81°22′32″W	Canton	
17	Earley-Hartzell House	Earley-Hartzell House	December 21, 1987 (#87002147)	840 N. Park Ave. 40°55′49″N 81°06′17″W	Alliance	Mabel Hartzell Historical Home at the Alliance Historical Society website.
18	East Main Street Historic District	East Main Street Historic District	September 8, 2017 (#100001588)	49-629 E. Main St., 40 N. Park, 77 S. Park, 532-570, 157 Prospect, 40 N.-136 S. Arch, 40 S. Linden Aves. 40°55′18″N 81°06′05″W	Alliance	
19	Elson-Magnolia Flour Mill	Elson-Magnolia Flour Mill	July 14, 2000 (#00000800)	261 N. Main St. 40°39′12″N 81°17′59″W	Magnolia	
20	Harry E. Fife House	Harry E. Fife House	July 21, 1987 (#87001196)	606 McKinley Ave. SW. 40°47′44″N 81°22′46″W	Canton	
21	Charles E. Firestone House		June 21, 2011 (#11000369)	2814 Westdale Rd., NW; 40°49′52″N 81°26′57″W	Jackson Township	
22	First Ladies National Historic Site	First Ladies National Historic Site	January 31, 2001 (#01000286)	205 and 331 Market Avenue, S. 40°47′48″N 81°22′31″W	Canton	
23	First Methodist Episcopal Church	First Methodist Episcopal Church	April 16, 1979 (#79001948)	120 Cleveland Ave., SW. 40°47′54″N 81°22′35″W	Canton	Home church of President William McKinley; now known as Church of the Savior
24	First Methodist Episcopal Church	First Methodist Episcopal Church	August 22, 1985 (#85001803)	301 Lincoln Way E. 40°47′50″N 81°31′08″W	Massillon	
25	First Methodist Episcopal Church of Alliance, Ohio	First Methodist Episcopal Church of Alliance, Ohio	May 2, 1985 (#85000945)	470 E. Broadway St. 40°55′10″N 81°05′58″W	Alliance	
26	First National Bank Building	First National Bank Building	May 8, 1987 (#87000689)	11 Lincoln Way, W. 40°47′46″N 81°31′23″W	Massillon	
27	First Reformed and First Lutheran Churches	First Reformed and First Lutheran Churches	September 28, 1982 (#82003647)	901 and 909 E. Tuscarawas St. 40°47′51″N 81°22′03″W	Canton	First Reformed is now called First Church of the Resurrection
28	Five Oaks	Five Oaks	April 11, 1973 (#73001535)	210 4th St., NE. 40°47′58″N 81°31′07″W	Massillon	
29	Fourth Street Historic District	Fourth Street Historic District	March 25, 1982 (#82003654)	Roughly bounded by 3rd, 5th and Cherry St. and Federal Ave. 40°48′04″N 81°31′11″W	Massillon	
30	Frances Apartment Building	Frances Apartment Building	June 6, 1988 (#88000668)	534 Cleveland Ave., SW. 40°47′40″N 81°22′35″W	Canton	
31	Garnet B. French House	Garnet B. French House	October 31, 2002 (#02001275)	2410 Cleveland Ave. 40°49′26″N 81°23′01″W	Canton	
32	Glamorgan	Glamorgan	October 5, 1972 (#72001043)	1025 S. Union Ave. 40°54′42″N 81°06′33″W	Alliance	
33	Haines House	Haines House	July 30, 1974 (#74001623)	186 W. Market St. 40°55′15″N 81°06′42″W	Alliance	Haines House website
34	Hartville Hotel	Hartville Hotel	January 3, 1980 (#80003235)	101 N. Prospect St. 40°57′51″N 81°19′51″W	Hartville	Renovated in 2019 as The Pantry restaurant. Previously named the Hartville Pie Factory and Restaurant.
35	Harvard Company-Weber Dental Manufacturing Company	Harvard Company-Weber Dental Manufacturing Company	July 21, 1987 (#87001194)	2206 13th St. NE. 40°48′34″N 81°20′52″W	Canton	
36	Hercules Motors Corporation Industrial Complex	Hercules Motors Corporation Industrial Complex	June 10, 2005 (#05000575)	101 11th St. SE. 40°47′27″N 81°22′35″W	Canton	
37	Hoover Company Historic District	Hoover Company Historic District	July 24, 2013 (#13000538)	101 E. Maple St. 40°52′35″N 81°24′05″W	North Canton	
38	Hoover Farm	Hoover Farm	August 3, 1979 (#79001955)	East of central North Canton on Easton St. 40°52′32″N 81°22′12″W	North Canton	Also known as the Hoover Historical Center
39	Ideal Department Store Building	Ideal Department Store Building	September 10, 1992 (#92001245)	55-59 Lincoln Way E. 40°47′47″N 81°31′20″W	Massillon	
40	Lake Township School	Lake Township School	June 22, 1976 (#76001528)	East of Uniontown at 1101 Lake Center St. 40°57′32″N 81°21′42″W	Lake Township	One room schoolhouse established circa 1850
41	Landmark Tavern	Landmark Tavern	March 12, 1982 (#82003648)	501 E. Tuscarawas St. 40°47′52″N 81°22′15″W	Canton	
42	Carl and Audrey Lavin House		August 31, 2018 (#100002880)	5240 Plain Center Ave., NE. 40°51′24″N 81°21′18″W	Canton	
43	John H. Lehman High School	John H. Lehman High School	August 24, 2017 (#100001508)	1120 15th St. NW. 40°48′51″N 81°22′59″W	Canton	
44	Loew-Define Grocery Store and Home	Loew-Define Grocery Store and Home	November 29, 1979 (#79001954)	202 S. Market St. 40°43′20″N 81°31′05″W	Navarre	Home of Justice of the Peace John Loew; site of President William McKinley's first law trial in 1867.
45	Louisville Historic District	Louisville Historic District	November 22, 2011 (#11000856)	Roughly bounded by Chapel, Lincoln, St. Louis Ct., Nickel Plate, E. Gorgas, and Center Ct. 40°50′15″N 81°15′34″W	Louisville	
46	Brooke and Anna E. Martin House	Brooke and Anna E. Martin House	January 21, 1999 (#98001642)	1627 Market Ave. N. 40°48′57″N 81°22′11″W	Canton	
47	Massillon Cemetery Building	Massillon Cemetery Building	March 12, 1982 (#82003655)	1827 Erie St. S. 40°46′35″N 81°30′55″W	Massillon	
48	Massillon Downtown Historic District	Massillon Downtown Historic District	June 8, 2018 (#100002553)	Roughly bounded by 1st and 3rd Sts. and Tremont and Federal Aves. 40°47′51″N 81°31′13″W	Massillon	
49	Maudru House	Maudru House	November 25, 1980 (#80003234)	11786 Easton St. in Maximo; 40°52′28″N 81°10′36″W	Washington Township	Maximo's only brick house
50	William McKinley Tomb	William McKinley Tomb	November 10, 1970 (#70000516)	7th St., NW. 40°48′24″N 81°23′33″W	Canton	
51	McKinley Park Apartments		January 21, 2021 (#100006041)	510 High Ave. SW; 40°48′09″N 81°22′45″W	Canton	
52	Mellett-Canton Daily News Building	Mellett-Canton Daily News Building	April 21, 1983 (#83002058)	401 W. Tuscarawas St. 40°47′57″N 81°22′35″W	Canton	
53	John Miller House	John Miller House	July 22, 1994 (#94000775)	9677 Cleveland Ave., NW., in Greentown; 40°55′37″N 81°24′11″W	Lake Township	
54	Mount Union College District	Mount Union College District	October 5, 1972 (#72001044)	Hartshorn St., Miller and Aultman Aves. 40°54′12″N 81°06′34″W	Alliance	
55	New Baltimore Inn	New Baltimore Inn	December 18, 1975 (#75001535)	14722 Ravenna Ave. in New Baltimore; 40°59′04″N 81°14′57″W	Marlboro Township	
56	Old McKinley High School	Old McKinley High School	June 30, 1982 (#82003649)	800 N. Market St. 40°48′13″N 81°22′20″W	Canton	
57	Onesto Hotel	Onesto Hotel	July 15, 1982 (#82003650)	2nd and Cleveland, NW. 40°47′56″N 81°22′30″W	Canton	
58	Palace Theater	Palace Theater	April 26, 1979 (#79001949)	605 Market Ave., N. 40°48′07″N 81°22′27″W	Canton	
59	Portage Street Elementary School		August 22, 2022 (#100008013)	239 and 301 Portage St. 40°52′37″N 81°24′15″W	North Canton	
60	Robert A. and Elizabeth H. Purcell House	Robert A. and Elizabeth H. Purcell House	October 13, 2004 (#04001146)	2700 Fairway Ln. 40°53′42″N 81°05′33″W	Alliance	
61	Walter S. Putman House	Walter S. Putman House	September 10, 1992 (#92001247)	303 Lawnford Ave. 40°39′18″N 81°38′17″W	Wilmot	
62	Harry S. Renkert House	Harry S. Renkert House	June 18, 1981 (#81000451)	1414 Market Ave., N. 40°48′46″N 81°22′14″W	Canton	Now houses the Greater Canton Amateur Sports Hall of Fame
63	Ridgewood Historic District	Ridgewood Historic District	December 19, 1982 (#82001489)	Bounded by Gibbs Ave., Frazer Ave., 25th St., and 19th St. 40°49′18″N 81°22′14″W	Canton	
64	Rochester Square Historic District	Rochester Square Historic District	October 26, 2005 (#05001187)	6 & 10 Lintner Ct. NW; 14, 207, 212, 222, 228, and 232 Center St. W. 40°43′15″N 81°31′37″W	Navarre	
65	St. Edward Hotel	St. Edward Hotel	May 2, 2005 (#05000024)	400 Market Ave. N. 40°48′02″N 81°22′26″W	Canton	
66	St. John's Catholic Church	St. John's Catholic Church	May 27, 1975 (#75001533)	6th St. and McKinley Ave., NW. 40°48′11″N 81°22′39″W	Canton	named a Minor basilica by Holy See in 2012
67	St. Joseph Roman Catholic Church Complex		November 19, 2020 (#100005806)	2427 Tuscarawas St. West; 40°47′57″N 81°24′08″W	Canton	
68	Saint Joseph's Roman Catholic Church	Saint Joseph's Roman Catholic Church	May 21, 2010 (#10000279)	322 3rd St. SE; 40°47′40″N 81°31′03″W	Massillon	
69	St. Louis Church	St. Louis Church	February 22, 1979 (#79001951)	300 N. Chapel St. 40°50′20″N 81°15′33″W	Louisville	
70	St. Mary's Catholic Church	St. Mary's Catholic Church	April 16, 1979 (#79001952)	206 Cherry Rd., NE. 40°48′08″N 81°31′22″W	Massillon	
71	St. Paul's Reformed Church	St. Paul's Reformed Church	April 26, 2006 (#06000318)	9669 Erie Ave., SW., south of Navarre; 40°40′22″N 81°32′20″W	Bethlehem Township	In 2008, was known as St. Paul's Community Church and had only one remaining active member.
72	St. Peter Church	St. Peter Church	March 22, 1990 (#90000472)	720 Cleveland Ave., NW. 40°48′14″N 81°22′29″W	Canton	
73	St. Timothy's Protestant Episcopal Church	St. Timothy's Protestant Episcopal Church	February 22, 1979 (#79001953)	226 SE. 3rd St. 40°47′44″N 81°31′04″W	Massillon	
74	Saxton House	Saxton House	April 26, 1979 (#79001950)	331 S. Market St. 40°47′47″N 81°22′33″W	Canton	
75	August Schuffenecker Building	August Schuffenecker Building	September 2, 1982 (#82003651)	134 6th St. SW. 40°47′41″N 81°22′34″W	Canton	
76	Science Hill School	Science Hill School	July 22, 1994 (#94000776)	11810 Beeson St., west of Alliance; 40°55′24″N 81°10′26″W	Lexington Township	One-room schoolhouse built circa 1870 operated continuously from 1884 to 1956; the last one-room school in Stark County.
77	Emanuel and Frederick Serquet Farm	Emanuel and Frederick Serquet Farm	December 2, 1982 (#82001490)	North of Wilmot at 14091 Stoneford; 40°40′52″N 81°37′42″W	Sugar Creek Township	
78	Seven Ranges Terminus	Seven Ranges Terminus	December 12, 1976 (#76001527)	West of Magnolia at the junction of Stark, Tuscarawas, and Carroll counties 40°39′07″N 81°19′05″W	Pike and Sandy Townships	Extends into Carroll and Tuscarawas counties
79	Spring Hill	Spring Hill	April 14, 1972 (#72001045)	Wales Rd., NE. 40°48′45″N 81°30′23″W	Massillon	
80	Stahl-Hoagland House	Stahl-Hoagland House	February 6, 1997 (#96001621)	330 W. Wooster St. 40°43′29″N 81°31′43″W	Navarre	Built in 1834 by Ohio and Erie Canal boat captain William Stahl. Purchased in 1881 by Marquis L. Hoagland, another canal worker. Now owned by the son of Hoagland's youngest daughter.
81	Stark County Courthouse and Annex	Stark County Courthouse and Annex	April 3, 1975 (#75001534)	Market and Tuscarawas Sts. 40°47′56″N 81°22′31″W	Canton	
82	Harry Bartlett Stewart Property	Harry Bartlett Stewart Property	April 29, 1982 (#82003653)	13480 Congress Lake Rd., northeast of Hartville; 40°58′46″N 81°18′17″W	Lake Township	
83	Dr. Kersey G. Thomas House and Office		September 19, 2024 (#100010821)	12315 Marlboro Avenue NE; 40°57′01″N 81°12′51″W	Marlboro	
84	Timken Vocational High School	Timken Vocational High School	December 7, 2018 (#100003211)	521 Tuscarawas St., W. 40°47′57″N 81°22′44″W	Canton	
85	Henry H. Timken Estate Barn	Henry H. Timken Estate Barn	December 29, 1978 (#78002193)	13th St., NW. and Interstate 77; 40°48′42″N 81°23′57″W	Canton	
86	The Town Pump of East Sparta	The Town Pump of East Sparta	April 1, 2009 (#09000172)	Junction of Walnut Street and Main Avenue; 40°40′00″N 81°21′12″W	East Sparta	
87	Trinity Lutheran Church	Trinity Lutheran Church	August 23, 1985 (#85001802)	415 W. Tuscarawas St. 40°47′58″N 81°22′40″W	Canton	
88	Upper Downtown Canton Historic District	Upper Downtown Canton Historic District	June 7, 2006 (#06000202)	Market Ave., between Sixth St. N. and 2nd St. S., east to west variable boundary 40°48′06″N 81°22′32″W	Canton	
89	Vicary House	Vicary House	March 15, 1982 (#82003652)	3730 Market Ave. N. 40°50′21″N 81°21′52″W	Canton	
90	Werner Inn	Werner Inn	September 17, 1987 (#87001635)	131 E. Nassau St. 40°47′15″N 81°17′00″W	East Canton	
91	Wilmot United Brethren Church	Wilmot United Brethren Church	June 22, 1976 (#76001529)	Massillon St. (U.S. Route 62); 40°39′24″N 81°37′55″W	Wilmot	

== Former listings ==
	Name on the Register	Image	Date listed	Date removed	Location	City or town	Description
1	Case Mansion		July 21, 1987 (#87001191)	July 26, 1990	1717 Market Ave. N. 40°49′01″N 81°18′26″W	Canton	Demolished June 28, 1990.
2	Hotel Courtland	Hotel Courtland	July 21, 1987 (#87001195)	January 31, 1995	209 W. Tuscarawas St. 40°47′55″N 81°22′33″W	Canton	Razed in 1992; also known as the Hotel St. Francis
3	William Kettering Homestead	William Kettering Homestead	January 11, 1983 (#83002057)	April 18, 1990	North of Massillon at 5509 Wales Ave. 40°51′48″N 81°29′07″W	Jackson Township	Relocated to 7753 Fulton Dr., NW, in Jackson Township
4	Third Street Bridge	Third Street Bridge	May 5, 1978 (#78002192)	September 17, 1982	3rd St., SE	Canton	

== See also ==
- List of National Historic Landmarks in Ohio
- Listings in neighboring counties: Carroll, Columbiana, Holmes, Mahoning, Portage, Summit, Tuscarawas, Wayne
- National Register of Historic Places listings in Ohio
