= Bender's Restaurant =

- Bender's Restaurant-Belmont Buffet
- U.S. National Register of Historic Places
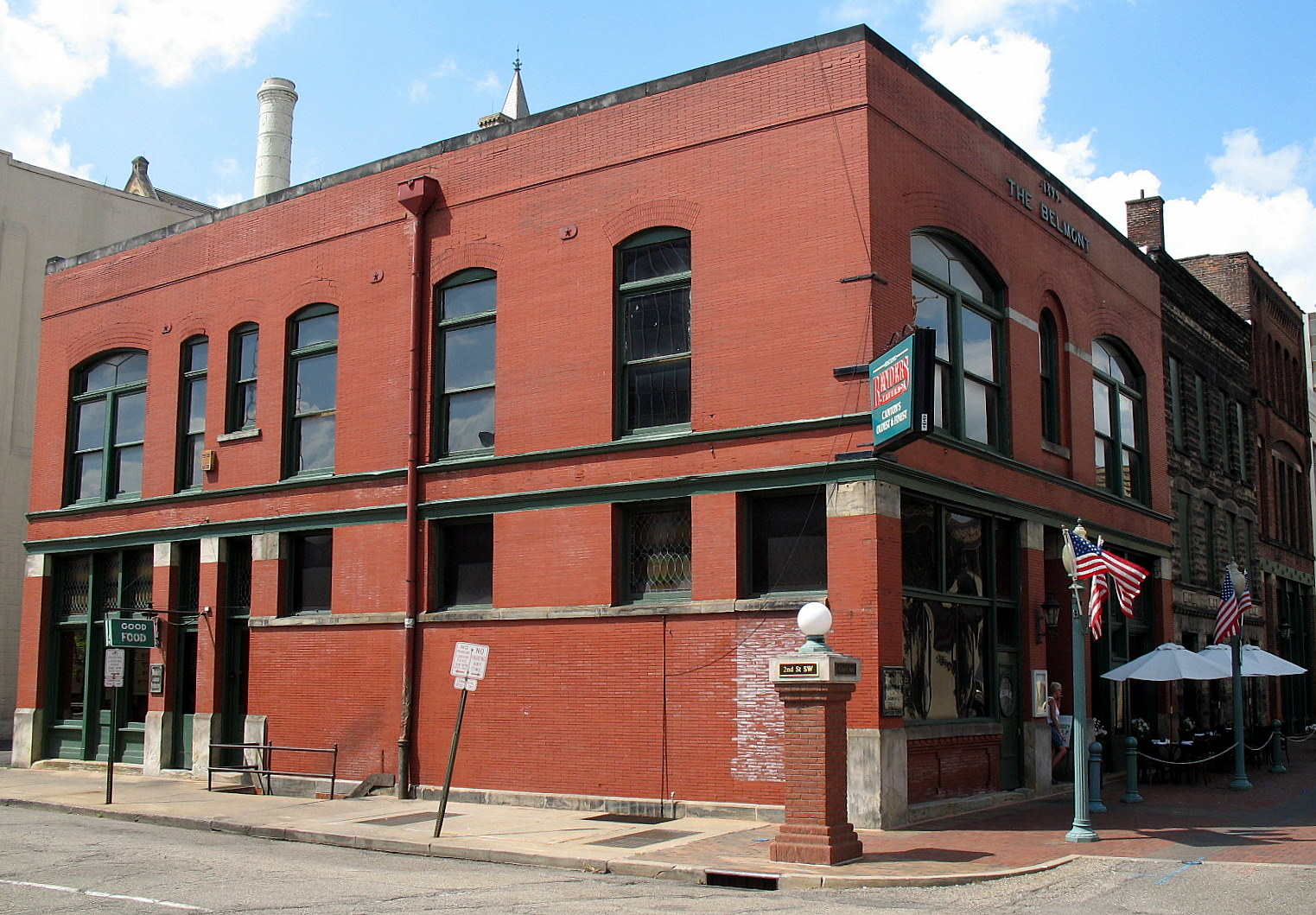
- Front and eastern side

- Location within Ohio Location within the United States
- Interactive map showing the location of Bender's Restaurant
- Location: 137 Court Ave. SW, Canton, Ohio
- Coordinates: 40°47′53″N 81°22′35″W
- Area: Less than 1 acre (0.40 ha)
- Built: 1899
- Architect: Guy Tilden
- MPS: Architecture of Guy Tilden in Canton, 1885-1905, TR
- NRHP reference No.: 87001193
- Added to NRHP: July 21, 1987

Bender's Restaurant is a historic restaurant and commercial building in downtown Canton, Ohio, United States. Constructed in 1899 and expanded soon afterward by connecting two adjacent buildings, it remains in use as a restaurant, and it has been named a historic site.

Canton's biggest years of growth occurred around the turn of the twentieth century, and Guy Tilden was the city's leading architect of the period. In the 1890s and early 1900s, Tilden favored the Romanesque Revival style, but Bender's represents a transition in his thinking away from revivalism and toward simpler, newer modes of construction. He was responsible for the original Bender's building, constructed in 1899 as the Belmont Buffet, although the present structure is significantly larger than the original building as purchased by the Benders firm in 1908. Soon after obtaining the Belmont, Benders bought two buildings next door, and before long the restaurant had displaced the former occupants, a livery and barbershop. No significant changes have been performed since 1908. By 1918, Bender's reputation had grown to the point that the Automobile Blue Book was promoting it as a destination for out-of-state road travellers.

Two stories tall, Bender's is built of brick on a foundation of sandstone, while the buildings added in 1908 are constructed of ashlar and brick. Bender's facade is divided into three bays; much of the exterior features stained glass in place of ordinary display windows, and comparatively little ornamentation is otherwise present. Inside, large amounts of wooden panelling are present, and other original elements are also present, including the separate women's entrance, the marble wainscoting, the coffered ceilings with visible structural elements, tiled floors, and a group of murals produced by a travelling German painter.

In 1987, Bender's was listed on the National Register of Historic Places, qualifying because of its historically significant architecture. It was part of a multiple property submission of five Guy Tilden-designed properties in Canton, all of which were added to the Register together; the Harry E. Fife House and the Weber Dental Manufacturing Company are likewise still on the Register, although the Hotel Courtland and the Case Mansion have since been removed.
