= National Register of Historic Places listings in Tuscarawas County, Ohio =

Location of Tuscarawas County in Ohio

This is a list of the National Register of Historic Places listings in Tuscarawas County, Ohio.

This is intended to be a complete list of the properties and districts on the National Register of Historic Places in Tuscarawas County, Ohio, United States. The locations of National Register properties and districts for which the latitude and longitude coordinates are included below, may be seen in an online map.

There are 26 properties and districts listed on the National Register in the county, including 2 National Historic Landmarks.

This National Park Service list is complete through NPS recent listings posted June 26, 2026.

== Current listings ==
| | Name on the Register | Image | Date listed | Location | City or town | Description |
|---|---|---|---|---|---|---|
| 1 | Frederick Bernhard House | Frederick Bernhard House | December 9, 1988 (#88002748) | 211 E. Front St. 40°31′19″N 81°28′21″W | Dover | |
| 2 | Chesapeake and Ohio 1308 Steam Locomotive | Chesapeake and Ohio 1308 Steam Locomotive | January 31, 2003 (#02001571) | 213 Smokey Lane Road SW; 40°28′44″N 81°39′59″W | Sugarcreek | Moved from Cabell County, West Virginia on May 22, 2026. |
| 3 | Katherine Cooper House | Katherine Cooper House | January 4, 1996 (#95001487) | 118 W. 7th St. 40°31′32″N 81°28′50″W | Dover | |
| 4 | John Deis House | John Deis House | June 30, 1988 (#88000980) | 203 W. 6th St. 40°31′27″N 81°28′54″W | Dover | |
| 5 | Dennison High School | Dennison High School | February 1, 2006 (#05001573) | 220 N. 3rd St. 40°23′40″N 81°20′01″W | Dennison | |
| 6 | E.D. Fisher House | E.D. Fisher House | September 24, 1999 (#99001194) | 432 S. Park Ave. 40°38′45″N 81°27′16″W | Bolivar | |
| 7 | Fort Laurens Site | Fort Laurens Site | November 10, 1970 (#70000518) | Near State Route 212, 0.5 mi (0.80 km) south of Bolivar; 40°38′20″N 81°27′22″W | Lawrence Township | |
| 8 | Garver Brothers Store | Garver Brothers Store | November 26, 1980 (#80003238) | 134 N. Wooster Ave. 40°35′51″N 81°31′40″W | Strasburg | destroyed by arson October 2010 |
| 9 | Gnadenhutten Massacre Site | Gnadenhutten Massacre Site | November 10, 1970 (#70000519) | South of downtown Gnadenhutten on a county road 40°21′15″N 81°26′06″W | Gnadenhutten | |
| 10 | Johnson Site II | | February 9, 1984 (#84003808) | Above Brandywine Creek, west of Dover | Dover Township | |
| 11 | T. Lanning & Co. Department Store | T. Lanning & Co. Department Store | April 28, 2000 (#00000420) | 226-228 Grant St. 40°23′34″N 81°20′03″W | Dennison | |
| 12 | John Lebol House, Smokehouse and Springhouse | John Lebol House, Smokehouse and Springhouse | July 15, 1982 (#82003660) | Route 1, east of Bolivar; 40°38′19″N 81°26′03″W | Lawrence Township | |
| 13 | Pennsylvania Railroad Depot and Baggage Room | Pennsylvania Railroad Depot and Baggage Room | September 8, 1976 (#76001536) | 400 Center St. 40°23′31″N 81°19′56″W | Dennison | Designated a National Historic Landmark June 17, 2011 |
| 14 | Christian Pershing Barn | Christian Pershing Barn | March 19, 1992 (#92000172) | Off State Route 39 west of Dover; 40°30′58″N 81°32′46″W | Dover Township | |
| 15 | Port Washington Town Hall | Port Washington Town Hall | February 22, 1979 (#79001971) | Main St. 40°19′40″N 81°31′08″W | Port Washington | |
| 16 | Ragersville School | Ragersville School | July 22, 1994 (#94000777) | 8807 County Road 52, SW. (Crooked Run Rd.) in Ragersville; 40°27′11″N 81°37′48″W | Auburn Township | |
| 17 | The Railway Chapel | The Railway Chapel | April 15, 2009 (#09000212) | 301 Grant St. 40°23′35″N 81°20′03″W | Dennison | Also known as the "Presbyterian Church of Dennison." |
| 18 | Jeremiah Reeves House and Carriage House | Jeremiah Reeves House and Carriage House | July 15, 1982 (#82003661) | 325 E. Iron Ave. 40°30′57″N 81°27′46″W | Dover | |
| 19 | Christian H. Rinderknecht House | Christian H. Rinderknecht House | July 31, 1991 (#91000972) | 602 N. Wooster Ave. 40°31′32″N 81°28′48″W | Dover | |
| 20 | Schoenbrunn Site | Schoenbrunn Site | November 10, 1970 (#70000520) | U.S. 250; 40°27′55″N 81°25′08″W | New Philadelphia | Schoenbrunn Village State Memorial |
| 21 | Seven Ranges Terminus | Seven Ranges Terminus | December 12, 1976 (#76001527) | West of Magnolia at the junction of Stark, Tuscarawas, and Carroll counties 40°39′07″N 81°19′05″W | Sandy Township | Extends into Carroll and Stark counties |
| 22 | Dr. Joseph Slingluff House | Dr. Joseph Slingluff House | November 19, 1998 (#98001384) | 606 N. Wooster Ave. 40°31′32″N 81°28′48″W | Dover | |
| 23 | Tuscarawas County Courthouse | Tuscarawas County Courthouse | July 16, 1973 (#73001544) | Courthouse Sq. 40°29′24″N 81°26′42″W | New Philadelphia | |
| 24 | Warther Family Home and Museum | | May 30, 2023 (#100009003) | 331 Karl Ave. 40°31′31″N 81°29′15″W | Dover | |
| 25 | Zoar Historic District | Zoar Historic District | June 23, 1969 (#69000150) | Bounded by 5th, Foltz, and 1st Sts. and by rear property lines of properties; also village of Zoar along State Route 212; also roughly bounded by Zoar Cemetery, Cemetery Rd., Lake Dr., the Tuscarawas River, State Route 212, 5th, E. 2nd, and East Sts. 40°36′48″N 81°25′22″W | Zoar | Second set of boundaries represents a boundary increase on August 11, 1975; third set of boundaries represents a boundary increase on September 20, 2013. Designated a National Historic Landmark District in 2016. |
| 26 | Zoarville Bridge | Zoarville Bridge | March 13, 1997 (#97000199) | Across the Conotton Creek east of the junction of State Routes 212 and 800, near Zoarville; 40°34′38″N 81°23′30″W | Fairfield Township | The only Fink through truss bridge known in the United States today |

== See also ==
- List of National Historic Landmarks in Ohio
- Listings in neighboring counties: Carroll, Coshocton, Guernsey, Harrison, Holmes, Stark
- National Register of Historic Places listings in Ohio
