= Alliance Bank =

Alliance Bank may refer to:

- Alliance Bank Malaysia Berhad
- Alliance Bank of Simla, Himachal Pradesh, India
- Alliance Bank, an associate organisation of Bendigo and Adelaide Bank, Australia

It may also refer to:

- Alliance & Leicester, United Kingdom
- Alliance Bank Building, Alliance, Ohio
- Alliance Bank Stadium, Syracuse, New York
- Alliance Bank Golf Classic, Syracuse, New York
- First Alliance Bank Zambia Limited

== See also ==
- NBT Bank, New York
