= Guy Tilden =

American architect

- Born: May 11, 1858; Youngstown, Ohio
- Died: August 6, 1929 (aged 71); Canton, Ohio
- Resting place: West Lawn Cemetery
- Occupation: Architect

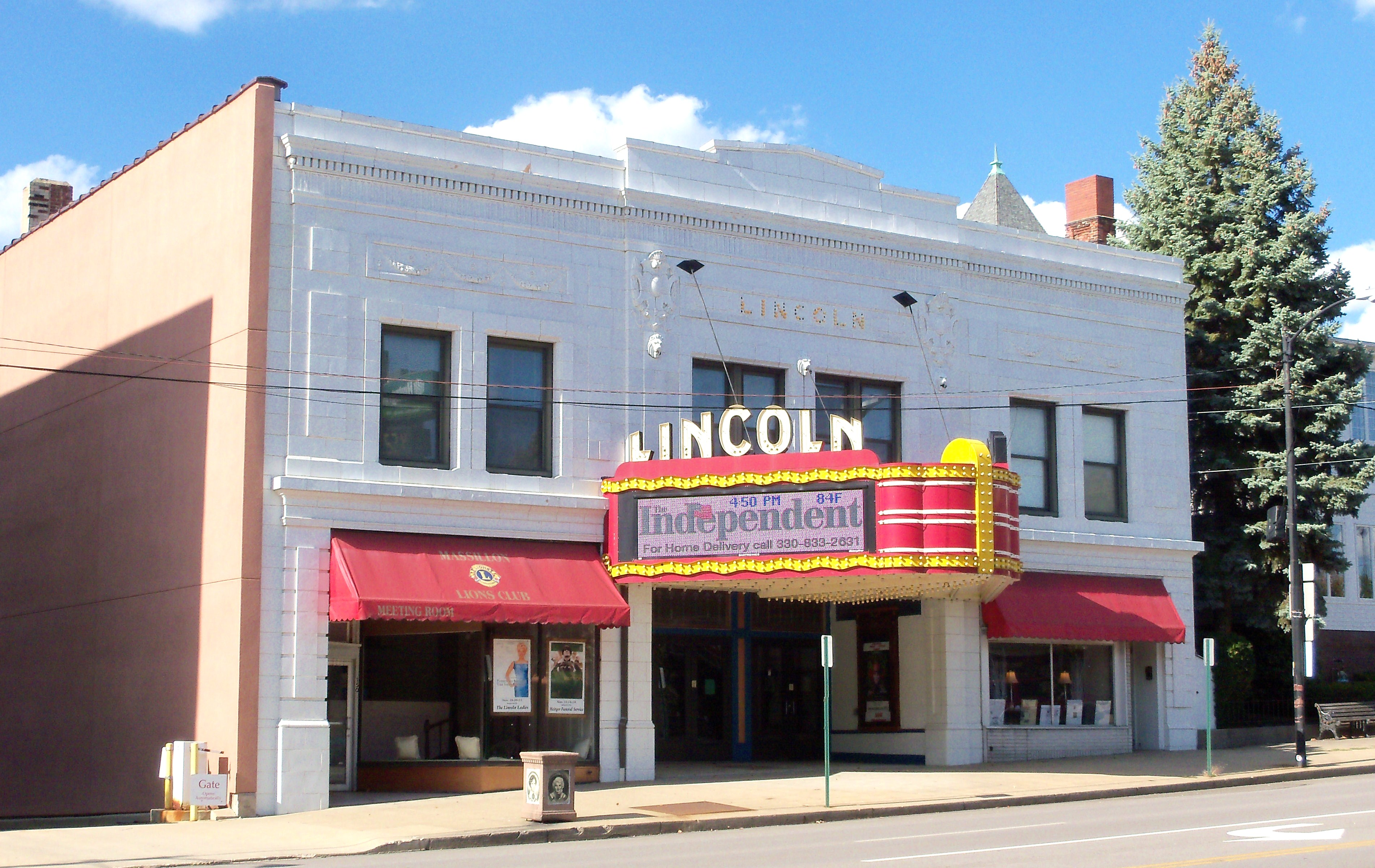
Lions Lincoln Theater, Massillon, Ohio

Guy Tilden (May 11, 1858 – August, 6, 1929) was a Canton, Ohio, United States Architect during the late 19th and early 20th century. Several of his structures are listed on the National Register of Historic Places.

Guy Tilden was born in Youngstown, Ohio on May 11, 1858. He married Belle La Grande Sanford on November 21, 1880 and moved to Alliance, and then to Canton in 1883. He and his wife had four children. Over the next decades, until the mid-1920s, he was Canton's premier architect. In 1889 he was named a Fellow of the American Institute of Architects. Guy Tilden died August, 1929. He was buried at West Lawn Cemetery A listing of some of the structures he designed follows

== Structures ==
=== National Register of Historic Places ===
Tilden designed numerous structures in Canton, Ohio, which were reviewed in a study that nominated many of them for nomination to the National Register of Historic Places.

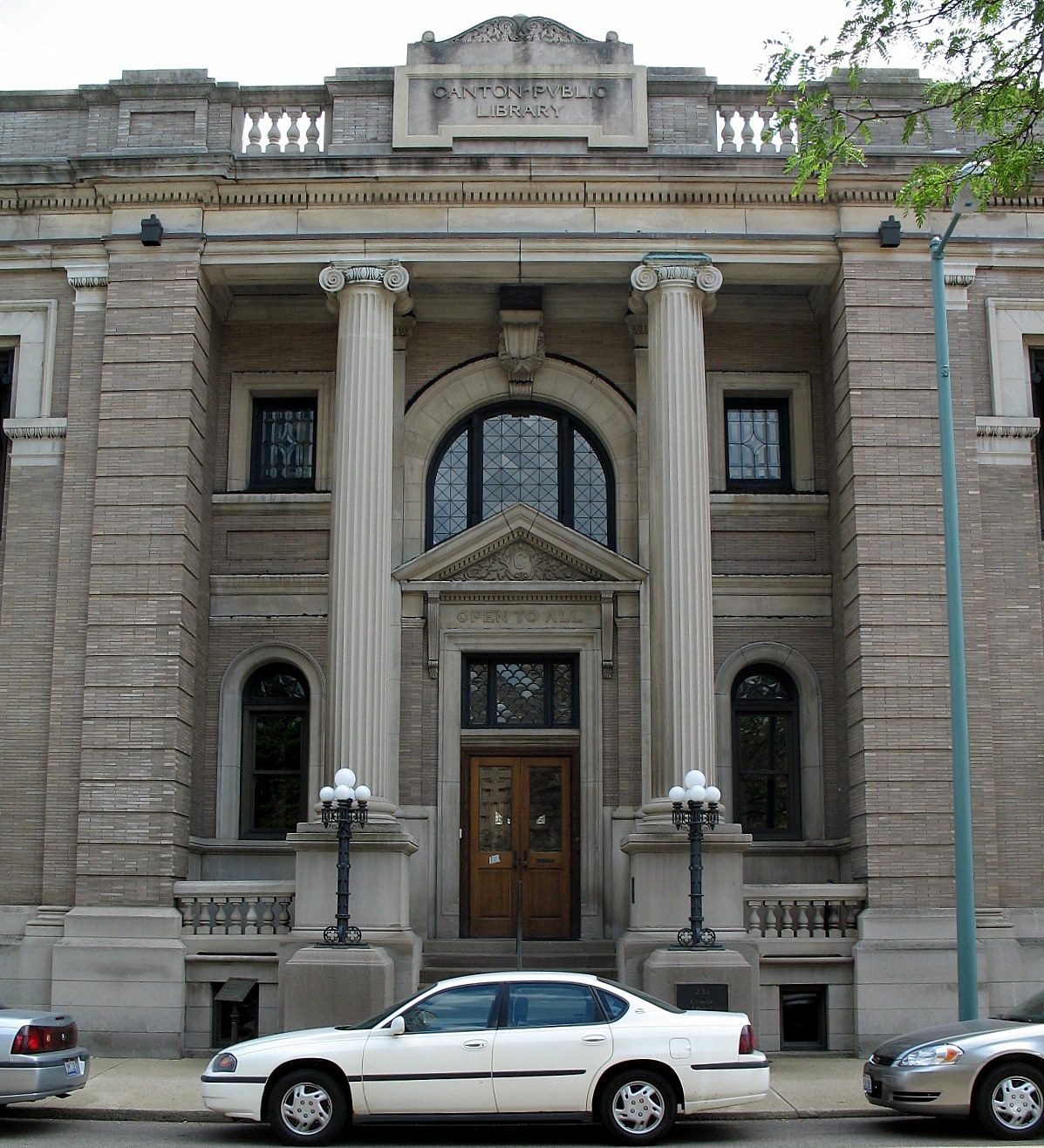
Canton Public Library

All located in Canton

- Bender's Restaurant-Belmont Buffet
- Canton Public Library
- Case Mansion
- Harry E. Fife House
- Harvard Company-Weber Dental Manufacturing Company
- Hotel Courtland
- Brooke and Anna E. Martin House
- Trinity Lutheran Church

=== Others ===
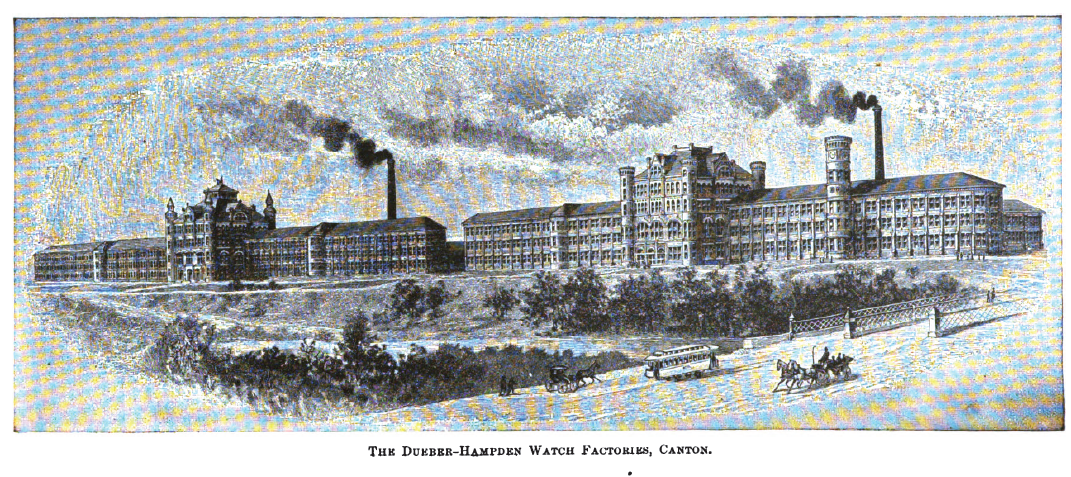
Dueber-Hampden Watch Factory, Drawn by Henry Howe

- Congress Lake Clubhouse - Lake Township
- Lions Lincoln Theater - Massillon
- Seventh Street Bridge (since replaced) - Canton
- Dueber-Hampden Watch Factory - Canton
- Seneca Street School - Alliance
- Hotel McKinley - Canton
- Dime Savings Bank - Canton
- F.E. Case Building - Canton
- William E. Sherlock Residence - Canton
- A.M. Dueber Residence - Canton
- Harry Harper Ink Residence - Canton
- Northeast and Southwest YMCA - Canton
