= Trinity Lutheran Church (Canton, Ohio) =

- U.S. National Register of Historic Places
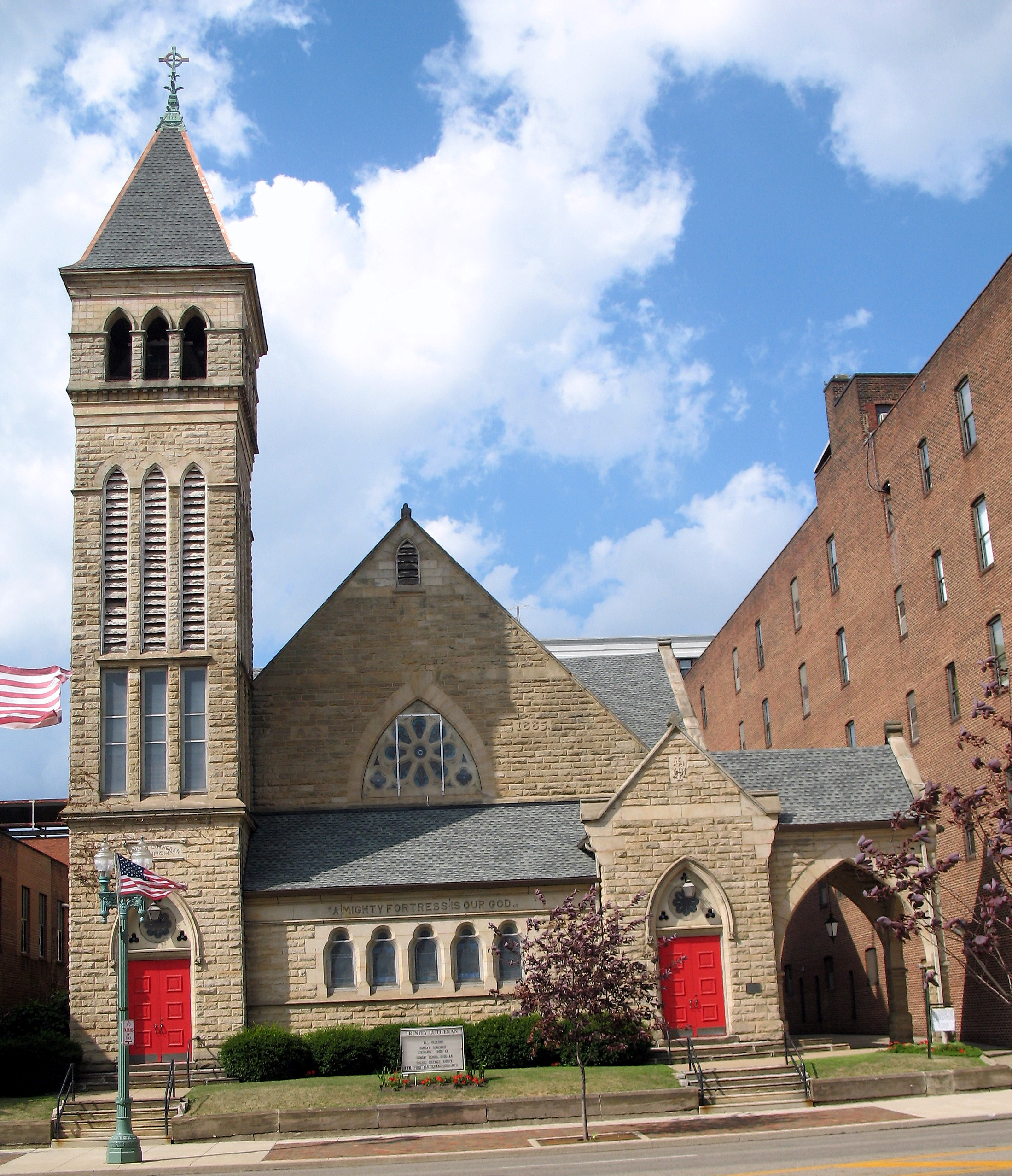
- Front of the church

- Location within Ohio Location within the United States
- Location: 415 W. Tuscarawas St., Canton, Ohio
- Coordinates: 40°47′58″N 81°22′40″W
- Area: Less than 1 acre (0.40 ha)
- Built: 1886
- Architect: Guy Tilden
- Architectural style: Romanesque Revival, Gothic Revival
- MPS: Architecture of Guy Tilden in Canton, 1885–1905, TR
- NRHP reference No.: 85001802
- Added to NRHP: August 23, 1985

Trinity Lutheran Church is a historic former Lutheran church in downtown Canton, Ohio, United States. Built in the 1880s for a flourishing congregation, it closed in the early 2010s, leaving behind a church building that has been named a historic site.

Canton's oldest Lutheran congregation, later designated First, was the parent congregation of Trinity; the pioneer members left First to organize a congregation to worship in English. Their new congregation was officially established in November 1838.

The church is primarily Romanesque Revival in style, reflecting the preferences of architect Guy Tilden, but the wishes of the church's building committee prompted him to include Gothic Revival elements. The appearance is dominated by the bell tower, 60 feet (18 m) tall, while other major elements include a porte-cochere and the ornate stained glass windows. Few Canton buildings exhibit Romanesque Revival architecture of comparable quality.

Built in 1886, Trinity is the oldest of Tilden's surviving designs in Canton. Its foundation is stone, with an asphalt roof and sandstone walls. The bell tower, located on the left from the perspective of a viewer across the street, features an entrance in the base and tall ogive windows that extend for the majority of the tower's height. Smaller ogive windows pierce the top section of the tower, which is crowned by a steep pyramidal roof. The main section of the church includes a street-facing gable at the center, while another entrance and the porte-cochere are located on the viewer's right. These components are designed in a manner reminiscent of the original Romanesque style, with elements such as the imitation cloister-style windows in the center of the facade and the increased thickness of the walls as one approaches the ground evoking the appearance of the original style. The building's overall footprint measures 70 feet (21 m) by 180 feet (55 m).

In 1985, Trinity was listed on the National Register of Historic Places, qualifying both because of its important architecture and because of its place in community history. It was the first of several Tilden-designed buildings given this distinction; two years later, several others (including the downtown Bender's Restaurant) were also added to the Register through the multiple property submission process. However, landmark status was unable to preserve the congregation indefinitely: in late 2010, the members voted to disorganize their church, following a period of decline that resulted in average Sunday worship attendance of just thirty people. After the congregation closed, the building was purchased by a local developer with plans to convert it into a wedding chapel.
