= Wilmot United Brethren Church =

Historic church in Ohio, United States

- U.S. National Register of Historic Places
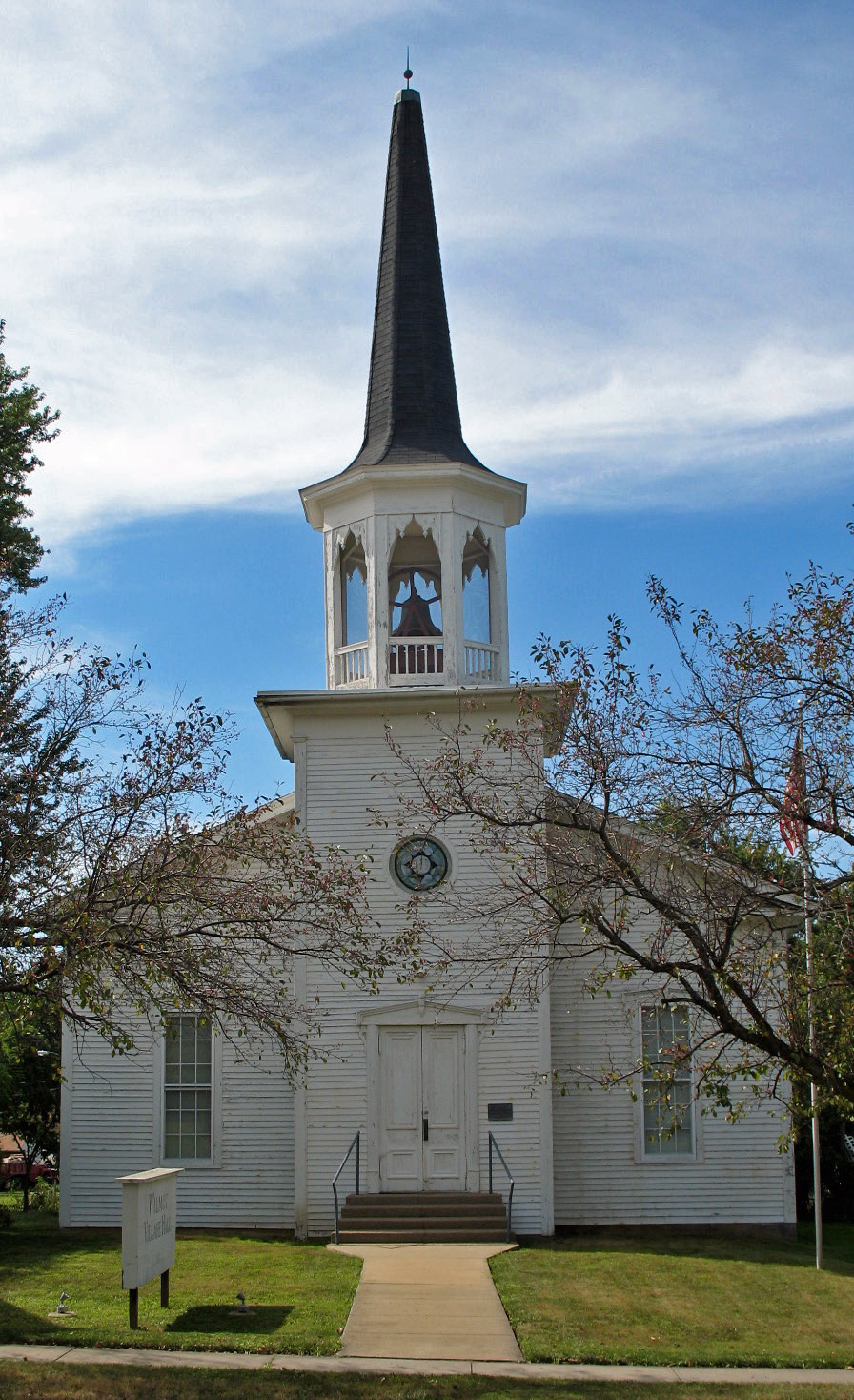

- Location within Ohio Location within the United States
- Location: Massillon St. (OH 62), Wilmot, Ohio
- Coordinates: 40°39′24″N 81°37′55″W
- Area: less than one acre
- Built: 1869
- Architect: Bell, William
- Architectural style: Greek Revival, Gothic, Italianate
- NRHP reference No.: 76001529
- Added to NRHP: June 22, 1976

Wilmot United Brethren Church is a historic church on Massillon Street (OH 62) in Wilmot, Ohio.

It was built in 1869 and added to the National Register in 1976.
