= First Church of the Resurrection =

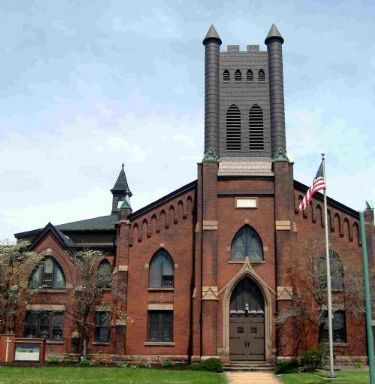
- Church exterior in 1997
- First Church of the Resurrection
- 40.7975416°N 81.3699945°W
- Location: 901 Tuscarawas Street East, Canton, Ohio
- Country: United States
- Denomination: Non-denominational
- Previous denomination: United Church of Christ
- Churchmanship: Evangelical
- Website: www.firstchurchcanton.com

History
- Former names: First United Church of Christ, First Evangelic and Reformed Church, First Reformed Church, Jerusalem's Reformed Church
- Status: Church
- Founded: 1810
- Founder: Rev John Peter Mahnenschmidt
- Dedication: 1862
- Dedicated: October 5, 1862

Architecture
- Functional status: Active
- Architectural type: Gothic Revival
- Groundbreaking: Spring 1861
- Construction cost: $7,000

Specifications
- Capacity: 450
- Materials: Stone, wood, brick
- First Church of the Resurrection, listed as First Reformed
- U.S. National Register of Historic Places
- Location within Ohio
- Coordinates: 40°47′51.15″N 81°22′11.98″W
- Website: www.firstchurchcanton.com
- Part of: Downtown Canton Historic District
- NRHP reference No.: 82003647
- Added to NRHP: 9/28/1982

First Church of the Resurrection is an historic church at 901 Tuscarawas Street East, Canton, Ohio, which is listed on the National Register of Historic Places. The church was dedicated, and its sanctuary completed, in 1862. In 2023, after its membership dwindled, First Church became a campus of RiverTree Christian Church.

== History ==
In 1810, the Union (Reformed and Lutheran) Church was built. Two years later, its Sunday school began. In 1843 a choir was formed, and in 1862 the present church was built. In 1866 or 1871, English-language services began. The church's ladies' aid society was founded in 1979.

In 1897, it incorporated as the First German Reformed Church. The following year, a Sunday-school addition was built and the church was remodeled. In 1903, its Women's Missionary Society was founded. Three years later, the Andrew Carnegie Fund paid half the cost of a new organ. In 1916 the church was again remodeled, and in 1926 and 1927 a parish house, educational center and social hall were added.

The parish house was destroyed by fire in 1937. Three years later, the church's name was changed to the First Evangelical and Reformed Church. In 1941, a new parish house was built on the old site. Its name was again changed to the First United Church of Christ in a denominational merger with the United Church of Christ in 1959.

In 1966, a new Fratelli Ruffatti organ was installed, and four years later a Bach musical festival was presented. The 901 Food Pantry began distributing food to the local community in 1978. The following year, the Karl Koepke Memorial Chapel was dedicated. In 1982 the church was listed on the National Register for Historical Places, an outdoor lighted sign was built and the west parking lot opened.

A new six-ton, 1,600-pipe Kegg organ was installed in 1993. From 2002 to 2005, a new office wing, classroom and meeting area were built. In 2005, the church severed its ties with the United Church of Christ and became the independent First Church of the Resurrection. The Shepherd's Garden was dedicated in 2007, and traditional and contemporary worship services began. Handel's Messiah was performed in 2008, and the church celebrated its 200th anniversary in 2010. All services are now conducted in English, rather than German.

In 2018, the declining congregation of First Church sold its building to RiverTree Christian Church, a non-denominational multisite congregation, for $100. RiverTree used the building to launch the One Center for Leadership, a coworking, leadership development and community engagement space. Under the terms of the transfer, First Church continued to meet in the building, and in 2019, it called the Rev. J.R. Rozko and the Rev. Amy Rozko, a married couple and Anglican priests in the Diocese of Churches for the Sake of Others, as co-pastors. However, the 2020 coronavirus pandemic posed additional challenges and membership dwindled to just 20. After the departure of the Rozkos in 2023, First Church voted to join RiverTree Christian Church as its eighth northeastern Ohio campus.

== Gallery ==
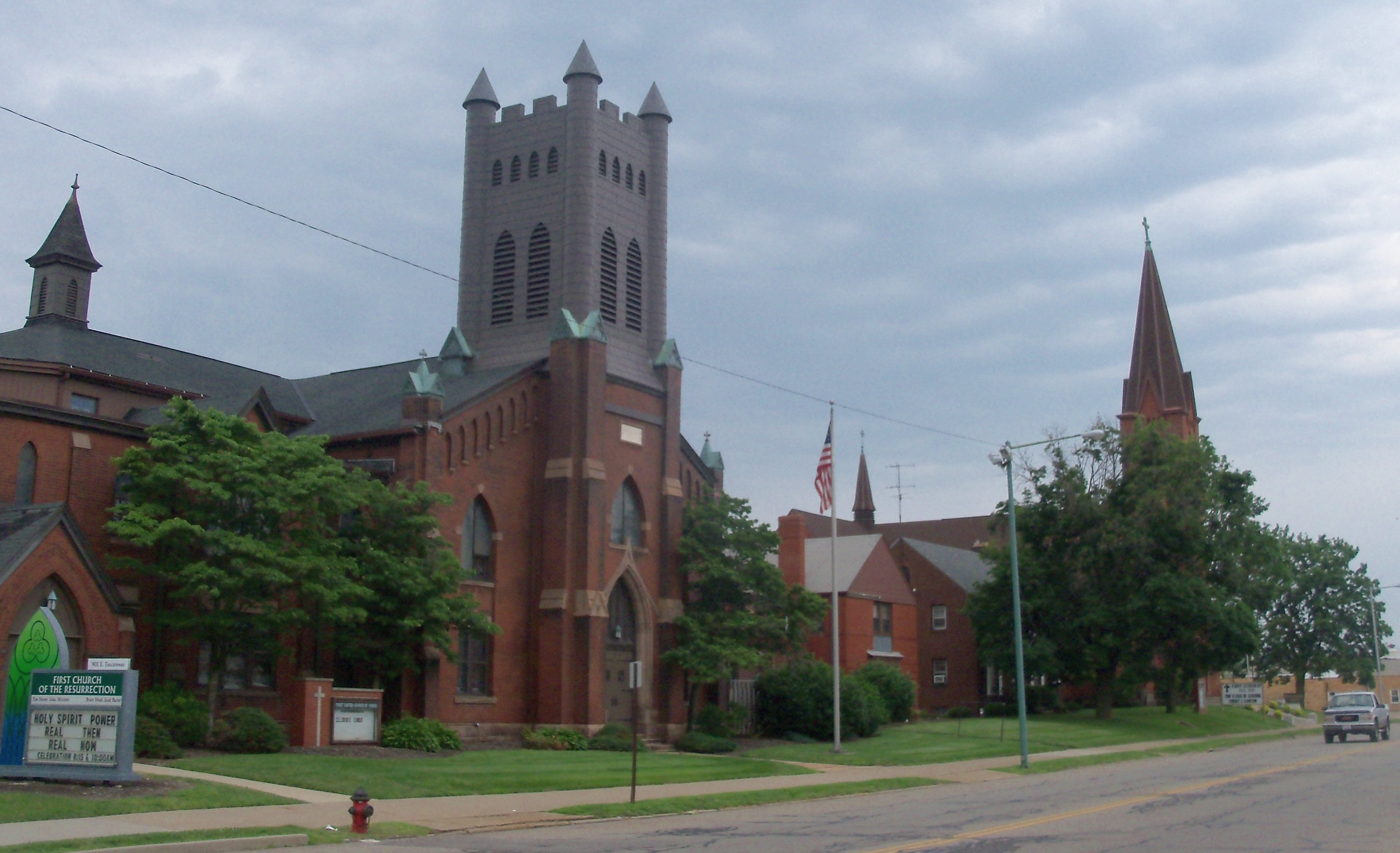
First Church of the Resurrection (left) and First Lutheran Church, both on the National Register of Historic Places

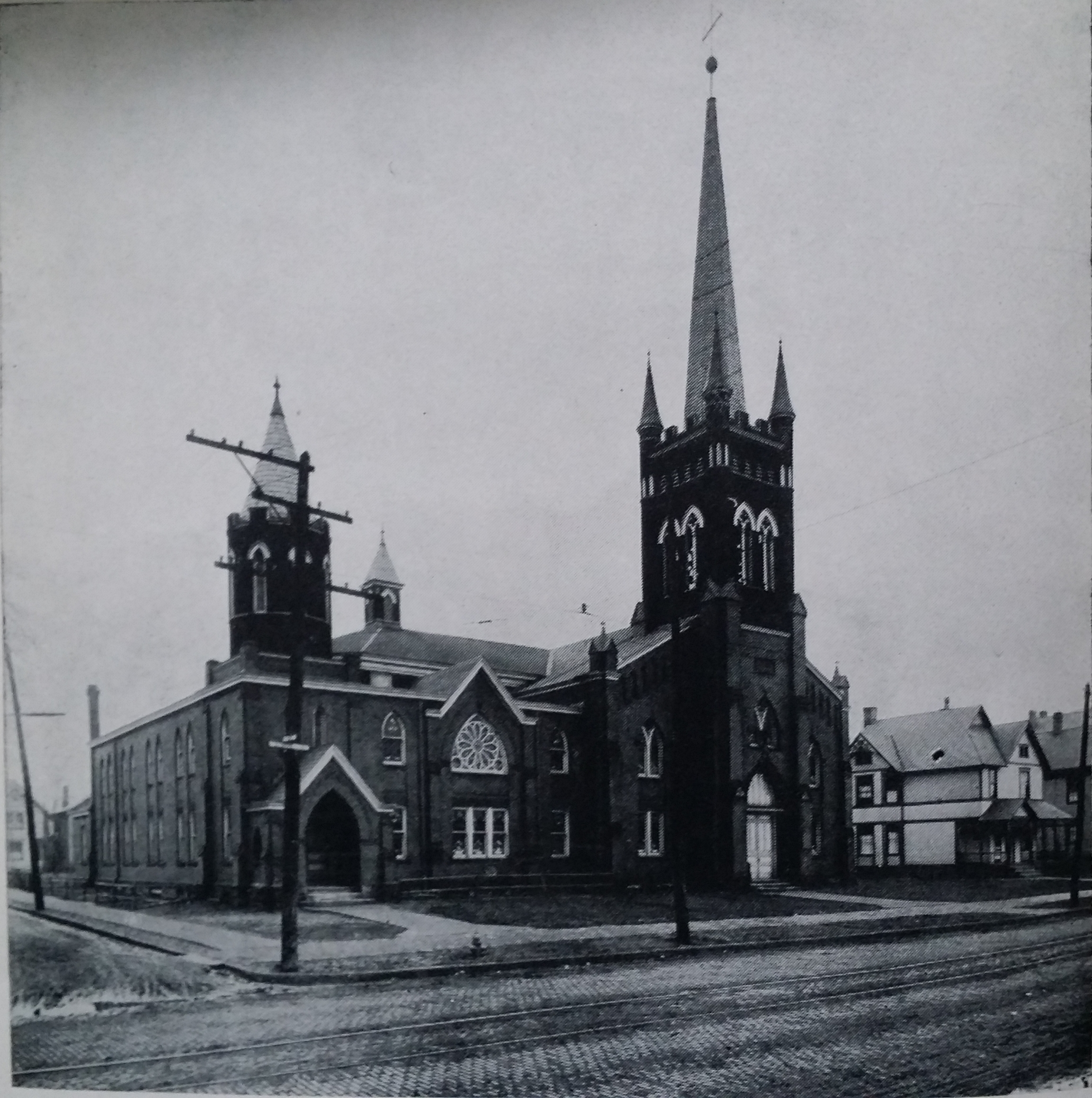
The church in 1890, with the new parsonage

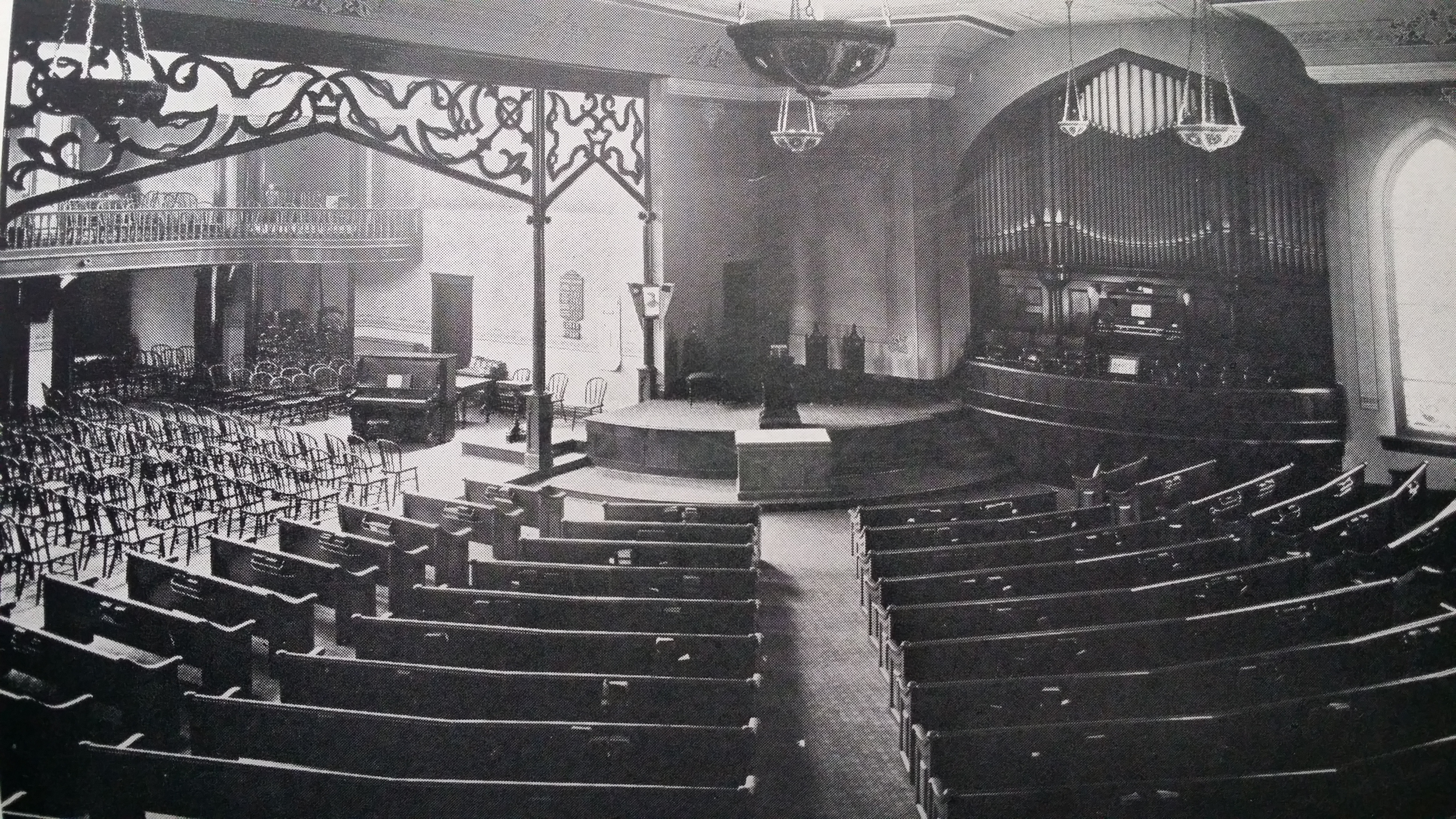
Church interior in 1917

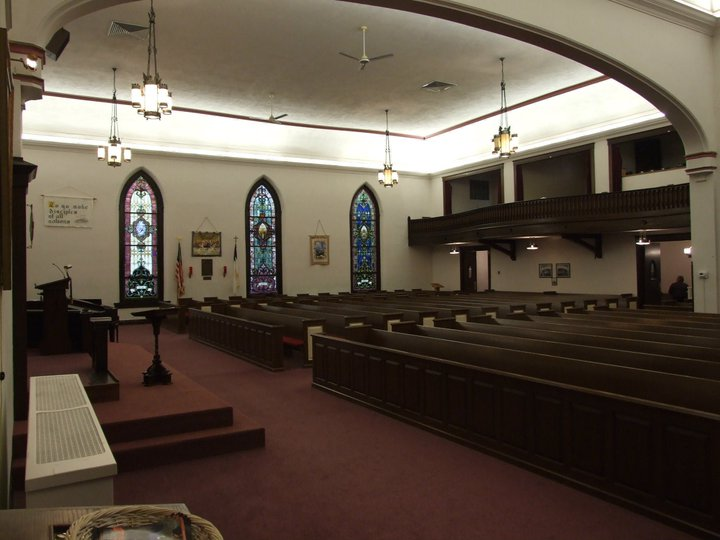
Church interior in 2010

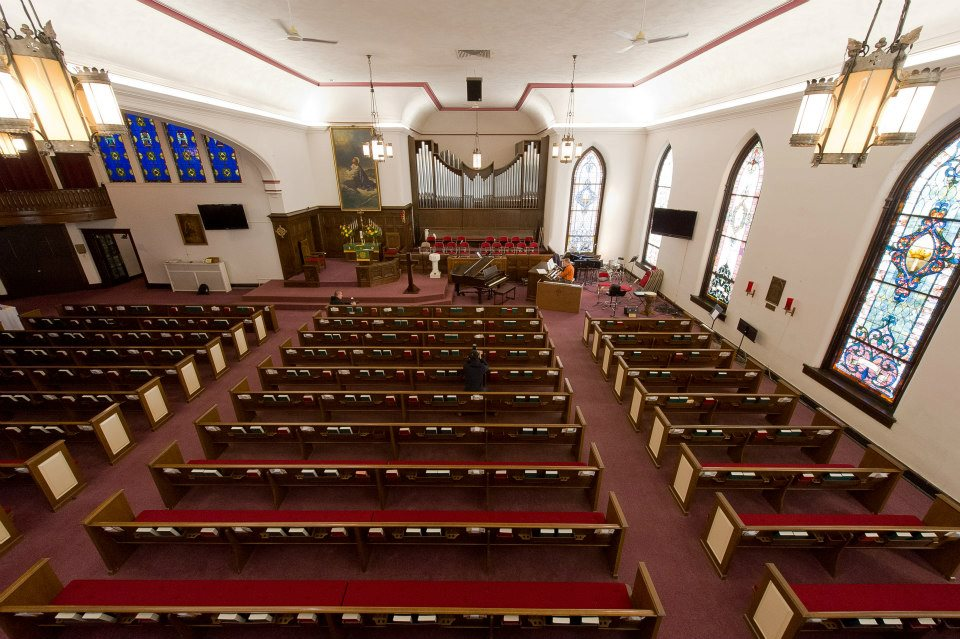
Another 2010 view of the interior
