= John and Syd Dobkins House =

House in Canton, Ohio

- U.S. National Register of Historic Places
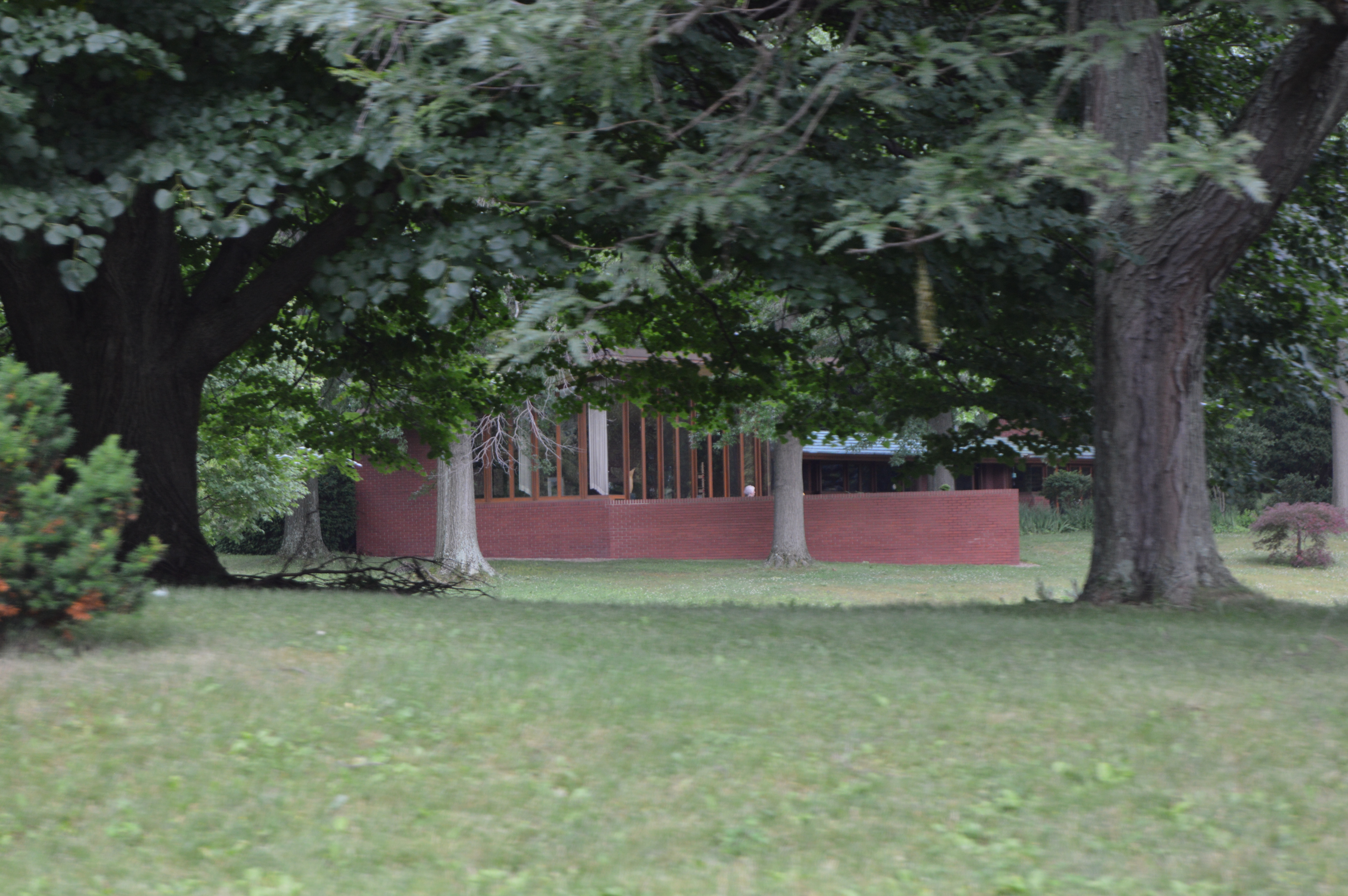
- Roadside view

- Location within Ohio Location within the United States
- Interactive map showing the location of Dobkins House
- Location: 5120 Plain Center N.E., Canton, Ohio
- Coordinates: 40°51′15.7″N 81°21′15.4″W
- Area: 5 acres (2.0 ha)
- Built: 1954
- Architect: Frank Lloyd Wright
- Architectural style: Usonian
- NRHP reference No.: 08001298
- Added to NRHP: January 8, 2009

The John and Syd Dobkins House is one of three Usonian houses in Canton, Ohio, United States, to be designed by Frank Lloyd Wright. Developed from 1953 to 1954, it is set back from the road and located farther east than the Nathan Rubin Residence and the Ellis A. Feiman House. It is a modest sized home with two bedrooms, and one and a half baths. Its distinctive geometric design module is based upon an equilateral triangle (unit size 4 feet). The mortar in the deep red bricks was deeply raked to emphasize the horizontal.

Construction was supervised by Allan J. Gelbin, a Wright apprentice the architect sent from the Taliesin Fellowship. Gelbin acted as construction supervisor and contractor on this building as well as the two other buildings in Canton (the Rubin and Feiman houses). The Gelbin house was built on a five-acre parcel that was once a cornfield. Along with a design for the house, Wright created an ingenious planting plan for the property which featured 14 pin oak trees planted in perfect relation to the structure.

The home was purchased and restored by current homeowners, Dan and Dianne Chrzanowski.

== See also ==
- List of Frank Lloyd Wright works
- National Register of Historic Places listings in Stark County, Ohio
