= Garver Brothers Store =

- U.S. National Register of Historic Places
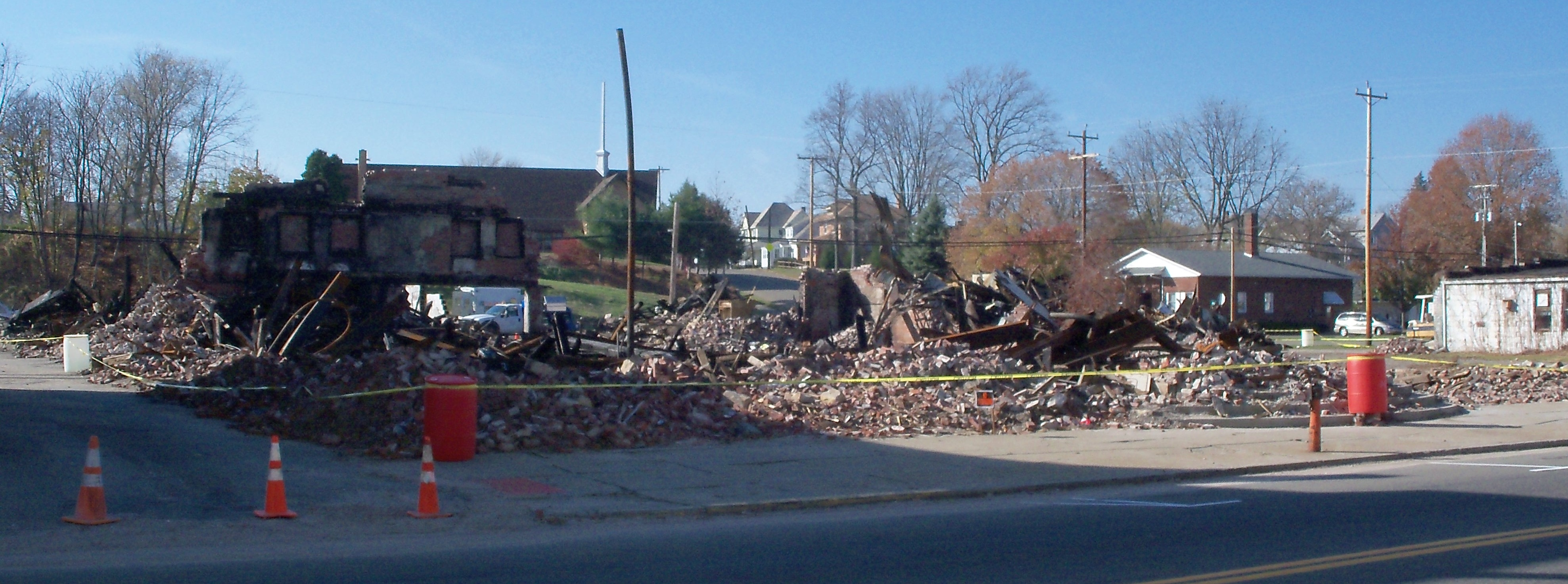
- Site of the store, twenty-five days after its destruction

- Location within Ohio Location within the United States
- Location: 134 N. Wooster Ave., Strasburg, Ohio
- Coordinates: 40°35′51″N 81°31′40″W
- Area: Less than 1 acre (0.40 ha)
- Built: 1902
- NRHP reference No.: 80003238
- Added to NRHP: November 26, 1980

The Garver Brothers Store was a historic commercial structure in the village of Strasburg, Ohio, United States. A simple commercial building in the village's downtown, it held a prominent place in the community and surrounding region. Named a historic site in the 1980s, it was destroyed by arson in 2010.

== Architecture ==
The store building was a composite structure: the walls built partially of brick and partially of concrete, while smaller elements featured both stone and wood. A simple rectangle in its plan, and built without a specific architectural style, the store was three stories tall with a five-bay facade: an arched entrance was placed in the center, framed by two large display windows on either side. On the upper stories, each of the five was divided into three smaller bays, and each floor featured similarly sized windows in each of the fifteen smaller bays. To the side, narrower windows faced an alley, with a metal fire escape providing access from the third floor.

== Early history ==
Franklin Township was organized in 1854, almost fifty years after settlers first built their cabins within its present boundaries. The first village, Milton, was platted in 1816, but its proximity to Wilmot was its ruin, and the township therefore had no more settlements until Strasburg was platted in 1828. In its early years, Strasburg was frequented by rowdy characters of poor reputation, but by the late nineteenth century, it had settled into a stable and quiet trading center for the surrounding area. In such a community, Rudy and G.A. Garver founded a store in 1866, using a log building as their premises. After a newer building was constructed in 1875, they moved into it, and an 1884 history noted their presence among seventeen other village businesses. The Garvers remained in their sturdier building until 1902, when it was destroyed by fire, but undaunted they laid plans for its replacement. Rather than simply rebuilding what was destroyed, they arranged for the construction of a far more extensive operation, and upon its completion later in the year, the Garver Brothers Store sold everything from dry goods to furniture, groceries to shoes, and pianos to carpets. As no other store in the region offered such a wide range of goods, the brothers touted it as the "World's Largest Country Store", and before long their clientele extended far past Ohio's boundaries.

== Final years ==
In 1980, the Garver Brothers Store was listed on the National Register of Historic Places. It qualified for inclusion based on its rôle in local history, as it had long occupied a prominent place in the community's identity, and the Garvers' wide range of products and long-distance clientele had made Strasburg a regional commercial center. For the next thirty years, it retained its central place in the community, even as it was converted into a flea market; the building's new function continued to bring shoppers from long distances, with its antique shops particularly attracting attention. Everything came to a sudden end on the night of 13–14 October 2010, when fire completely destroyed the building. Nineteen fire departments responded to the blaze, using so much water that they were forced to draw directly from the Tuscarawas River, but they quickly saw that all their efforts were necessary simply to preserve neighboring buildings. At the same time, other departments were fighting three other fires just a few miles to the north in Beach City and Brewster, and within two days the state fire marshal's office had determined that all four were arsons. Fires at the other buildings, a church and a pair of vacant businesses, were quickly contained, and none of the fires resulted in injuries.
