= Weber Dental Manufacturing Company =

- Harvard Company-Weber Dental Manufacturing Company
- U.S. National Register of Historic Places
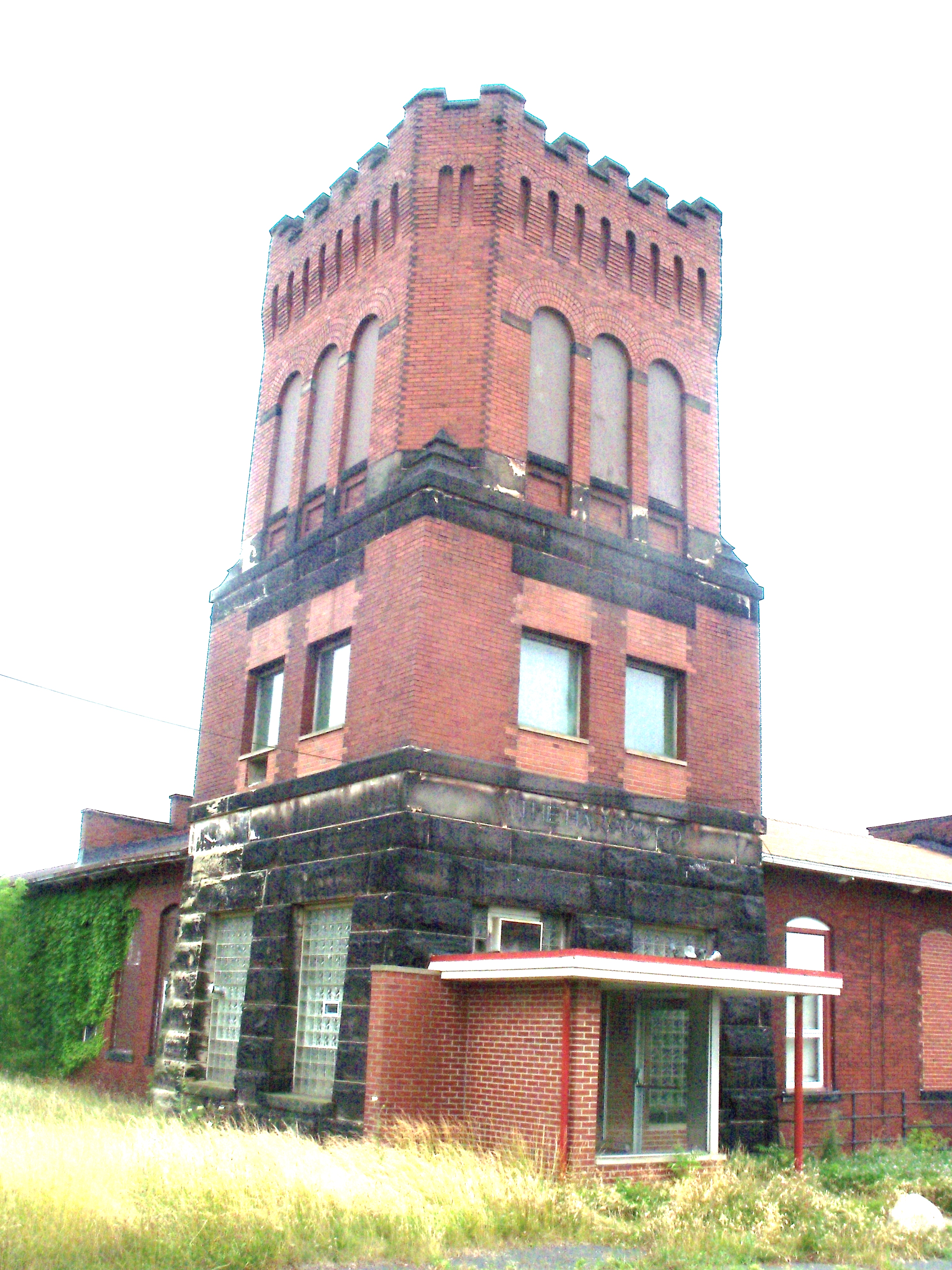

- Location within Ohio Location within the United States
- Interactive map showing the location of Weber Dental Manufacturing Company
- Location: 2206 Thirteenth St. NE, Canton, Ohio
- Coordinates: 40°48′34″N 81°20′52″W
- Area: less than one acre
- Built: 1896
- Architect: Tilden, Guy
- Architectural style: Romanesque
- Demolished: 2023
- MPS: Architecture of Guy Tilden in Canton, 1885--1905, TR
- NRHP reference No.: 87001194
- Added to NRHP: July 21, 1987

The Harvard Company-Weber Dental Manufacturing Company, also known as Factory Industrial Supply, was a company in Ohio, United States. Its main building, of the same name as the company, was built in 1896. Guy Tilden designed the building on a commission from Frank E. Case, who also hired Tilden to design the Case Mansion.

The building was listed on the National Register of Historic Places in 1987. After a series of fires, it was demolished as part of a brownfield remediation program in 2023.
