= Kegg Pipe Organ Builders =

Kegg Pipe Organ Builders is a manufacturer of pipe organs based out of Hartville, Ohio, U.S.A.

The company was founded by Charles E. Kegg in 1985. Kegg had previously worked with a number of organ building firms, including Casavant Frères. He worked on organs of a wide variety of sizes, from four stops up to over 100 stops.

Kegg founded his own company out of a desire to provide electric action instruments that are mechanically innovative and tonally well designed. His company's philosophy when it comes to instruments is to build organs that are "American" in character instead of copying other older styles.

Since the founding of the company, Kegg has produced over forty instruments. His company also has been involved in restoring instruments — for example by making replacement consoles and restoring historic organs, especially Moller and Aeolian player organs and Welte Philharmonic organs.
