= Saint Joseph's Roman Catholic Church (Massillon, Ohio) =

Historic church in Ohio, United States

- U.S. National Register of Historic Places
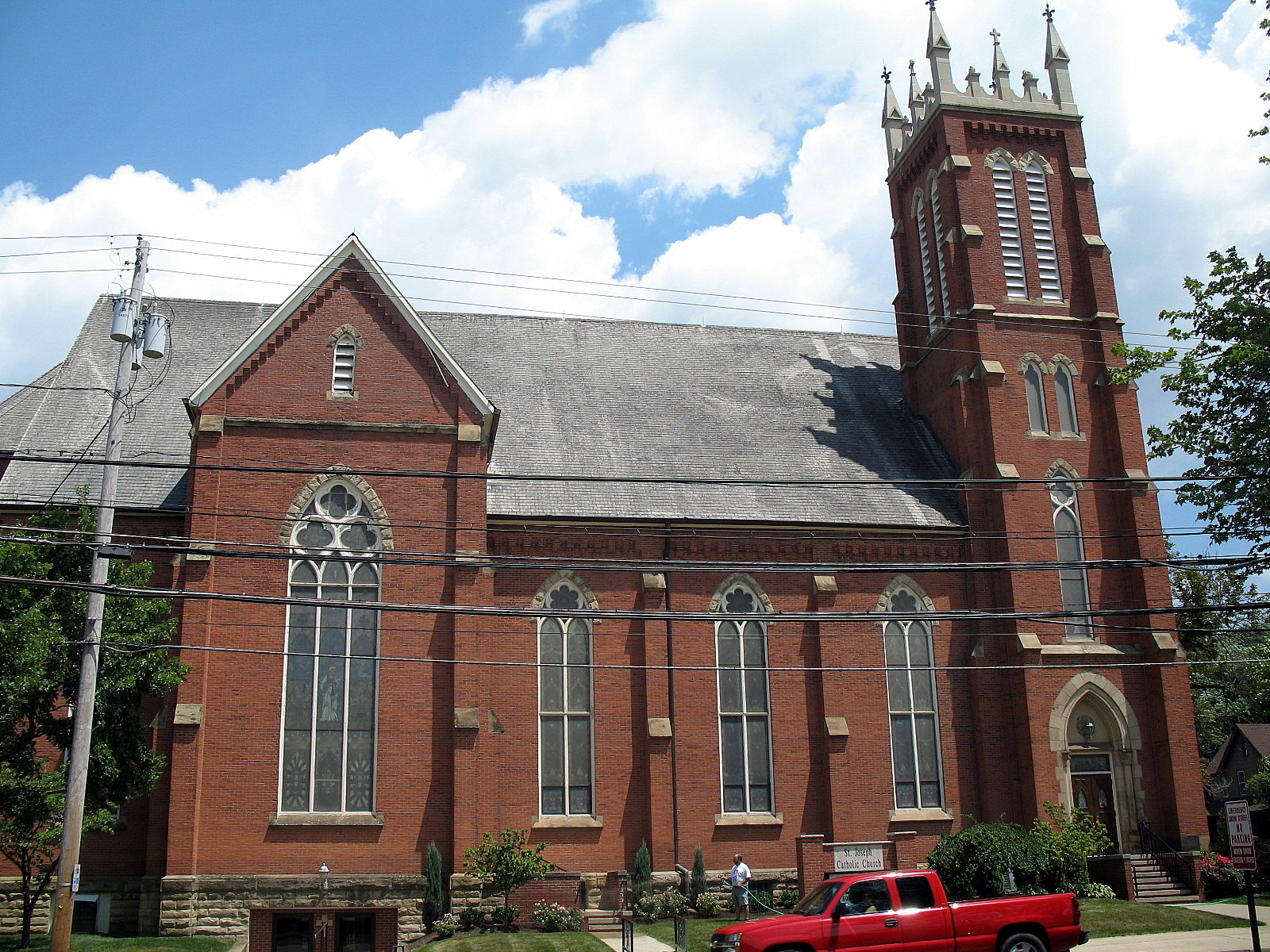

- Location within Ohio Location within the United States
- Location: 322 3rd St. SE., Massillon, Ohio
- Coordinates: 40°47′39″N 81°31′3″W
- Area: less than one acre
- Architect: John Baptist Verment
- Architectural style: Gothic
- NRHP reference No.: 10000279
- Added to NRHP: May 21, 2010

Saint Joseph's Roman Catholic Church is a historic church at 322 3rd Street SE in Massillon, Ohio, United States.

The designer was John Verment, a French-born architect who also contributed to the design of St. Mary's Catholic Church elsewhere in Massillon.

It was added to the National Register in 2010.
