= St. Paul's Reformed Church (Navarre, Ohio) =

- U.S. National Register of Historic Places
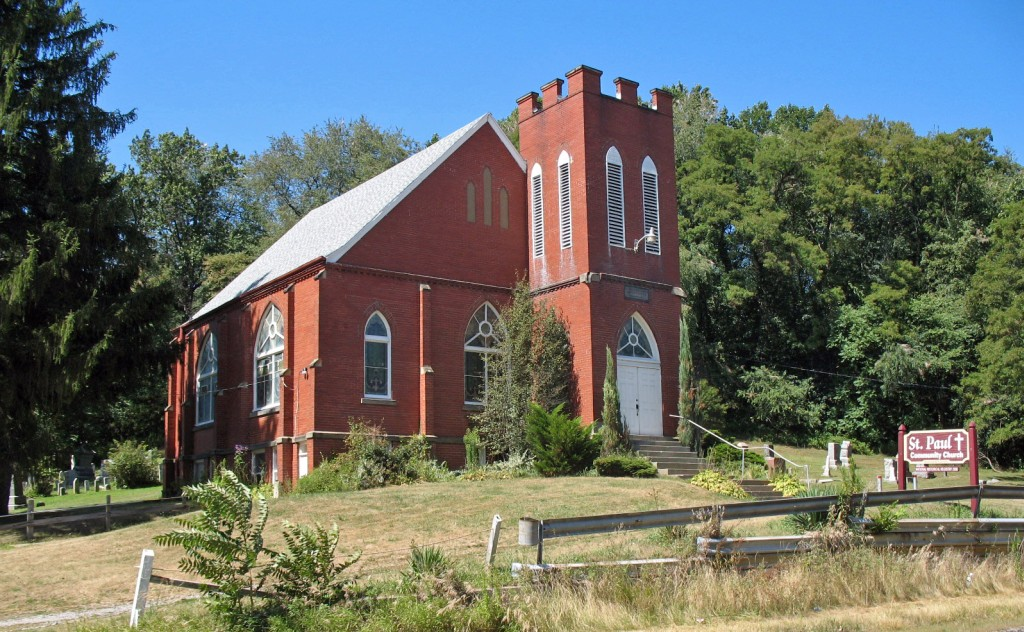
- Front and side of the church

- Location within Ohio Location within the United States
- Location: 9669 Erie Ave., SW, Navarre, Ohio
- Coordinates: 40°40′22″N 81°32′20″W
- Area: 1.5 acres (0.61 ha)
- Built: 1913
- Architectural style: Gothic Revival
- NRHP reference No.: 06000318
- Added to NRHP: April 26, 2006

St. Paul's Reformed Church is a historic former Evangelical and Reformed Church congregation near the village of Navarre in Stark County, Ohio, United States. Established in the 1830s, it remained in existence into the 1990s, and while it has since withered away into nonexistence, its early twentieth-century church building survives and has been named a historic site.

A German Reformed church was active in Bethlehem Township by the 1810s, and St. Paul's Church was organized in 1835. The original church building was constructed in 1845 and stood for nearly seventy years; when it burned in 1913, the present church was constructed on the same site.

Gothic Revival in style, the church is a brick building with stucco-covered roof, set on a foundation of a mix of brick and concrete. The building sits atop a small hill, with stairs rising both to the side and the front of the building. Its main entrance is set in a square tower with lancet windows in the second story, while the principal portion of the building is a rectangular building rising to a gable. Brick buttresses split the exterior into several bays, some wider than others; the narrow bays are continuous, while wide ogive windows and smaller rectangular windows pierce the wider bays.

In the early twentieth century, St. Paul's was the social center for the small unincorporated community of Smoketown, and the church membership roll comprised hundreds of names, but both community and church have dwindled; every Smoketown business has closed, and while the congregation remained active into the 1990s, it is no longer active. By the late 2000s, only one previous member remained active, spending church money and his own funds to keep the building in repair, although the building was no longer in use aside from occasional weddings. The church cemetery is also maintained, cared for by the township. In 2006, the church was listed on the National Register of Historic Places, qualifying because of its historically significant architecture. It is one of four Register-listed locations in the vicinity of Navarre, along with the Loew-Define Grocery Store and Home, the Rochester Square Historic District, and the Stahl-Hoagland House.
