= Brooke and Anna E. Martin House =

Historic house in Ohio, United States

- U.S. National Register of Historic Places
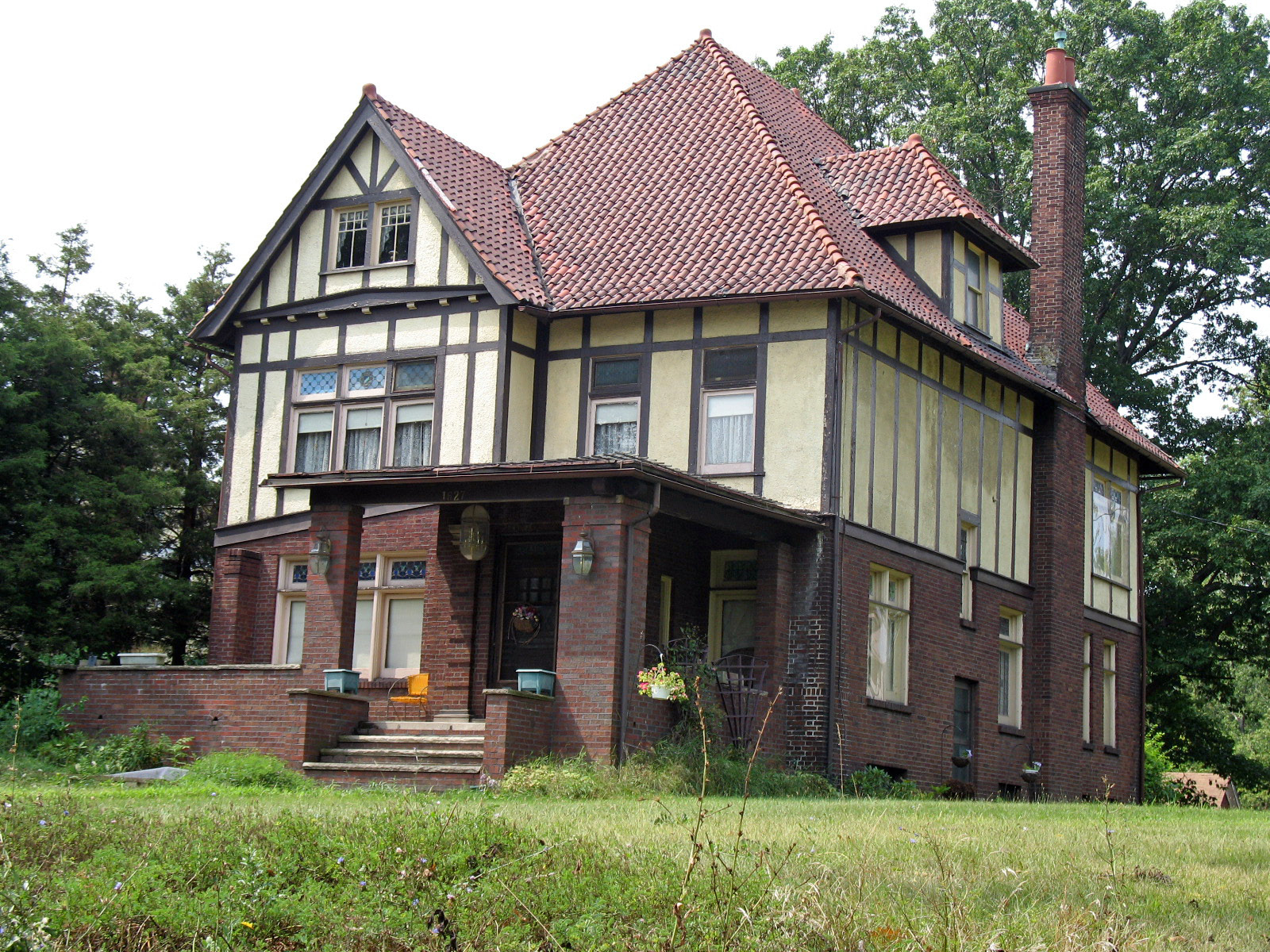

- Location within Ohio Location within the United States
- Interactive map showing the location for Brooke and Anna E. Martin House
- Location: 1627 Market Ave. N., Canton, Ohio
- Coordinates: 40°48′57″N 81°22′11″W
- Area: less than one acre
- Built: 1911
- Architect: Tilden, Guy
- Architectural style: Tudor Revival
- MPS: Architecture of Guy Tilden in Canton, 1885--1905, TR
- NRHP reference No.: 98001642
- Added to NRHP: January 21, 1999

The Brooke and Anna E. Martin House in Canton, Ohio was built in 1911. It was designed by architect Guy Tilden in Tudor Revival style. It was listed on the National Register of Historic Places in 1999.

Tilden designed numerous structures in Canton, Ohio, a number of which were nominated together for National Register listing.
