= St. Mary's Catholic Church (Massillon, Ohio) =

- U.S. National Register of Historic Places
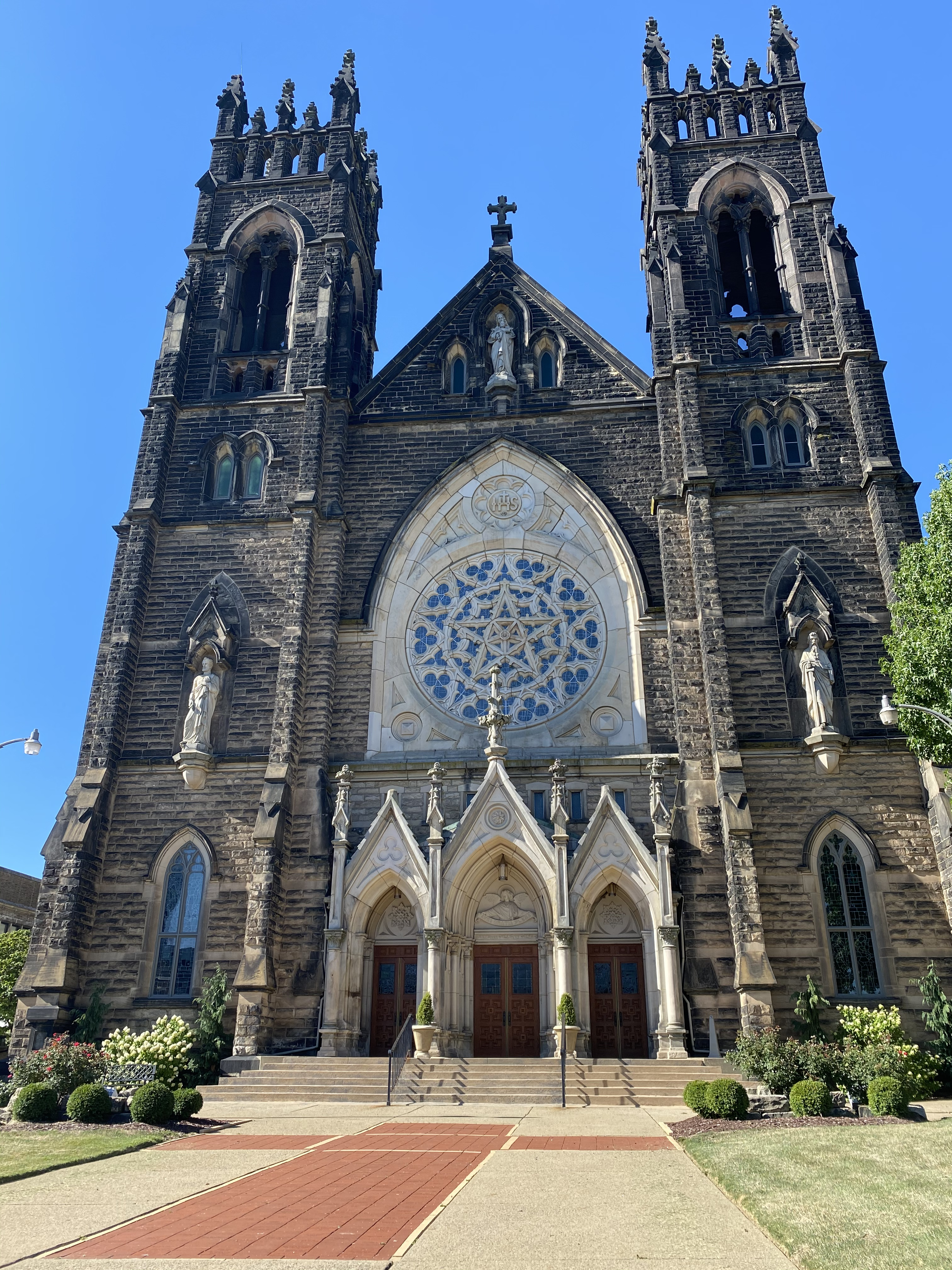
- Front of the church

- Location within Ohio Location within the United States
- Interactive map showing the location for St Mary’s Catholic Church, Massilon
- Location: 206 Cherry Rd., NE, Massillon, Ohio
- Coordinates: 40°48′8″N 81°31′22″W
- Area: Less than 1 acre (0.40 ha)
- Built: 1876
- Architect: Leon Beaver
- Architectural style: Gothic Revival
- NRHP reference No.: 79001952
- Added to NRHP: April 16, 1979

St. Mary's Catholic Church is a historic Catholic church building in the city of Massillon, Ohio, United States. Constructed in 1876 for a congregation composed largely of European immigrants, it has been named a historic site. The parish remains an active part of the Roman Catholic Diocese of Youngstown.

== History ==
The origins of St. Mary parish lie among numerous Germans and Irish who settled in Massillon in its early years and built a small house of worship on Cherry Road in the 1840s. This building stood until 1875, when it was destroyed so that the present church might occupy its location; it was built in 1876. The designer was Leon Beaver, a Dayton architect. He was assisted in design and in stonecarving by Massillon resident John Verment, who later designed St. Joseph's Catholic Church elsewhere in Massillon.

== Structure ==
Built primarily of sandstone, St. Mary's is a high Gothic Revival structure with a facade of two nearly identical towers and a Latin cross floor plan. The entire building measures 185 feet (56 m) from north to south and 85 feet (26 m) on the sides. Sculptures are placed in small alcoves on the second stories of the towers and at the peak of the front gable, while windows and belfries occupy the higher stories of the towers. The main entrance comprises three adjacent portals underneath a large rose window at the center of the facade. Both the buttresses and the corners of the towers rise to decorative finials, while a large cross crowns the front gable.

== National shrine of St. Dymphna ==
In addition to its usual functions as a parish church, St. Mary's houses a shrine to Saint Dymphna, a medieval Irish virgin martyr, although the shrine needed a complete reconstruction after being destroyed in a 2015 fire. The church was listed on the National Register of Historic Places in early 1979, qualifying because of its historically significant architecture. It is one of four Massillon churches with this designation, along with First Methodist Church, John Verment's St. Joseph's Catholic Church, and St. Timothy's Episcopal Church.

=== 2015 fire and repairs ===
On August 4, 2015, a fire destroyed the chapel that contained the Shrine of St Dymphna within St. Mary's Catholic Church, as well as the parish's baptistry. The fire may have been caused by a woman who was given permission by the priest to stay after Mass and take photographs of the church. Following the fire, the neighboring St. Paul's Lutheran Church held a prayer service, which was officiated by the clergymen of St. Mary's Catholic Church and St. Paul's Lutheran Church. The same St. Paul's Lutheran Church offered its church to the congregation of St. Mary's Catholic Church while the latter community's church building was being repaired. The Catholic Exponent, the official publication of the Roman Catholic Diocese of Youngstown commented on the situation, stating that:

Rev. Saylor offered help on the day of the fire, noted Father Ed Gretchko, St. Mary pastor. Father Gretchko mentioned this to Bishop Murry, who was impressed with the gesture of ecumenism and brotherly love, the priest said. Then, a few days later, St. Paul’s council met with Rev. Saylor. “He called me after the meeting and he said, ‘Ed, the question isn’t yes or no, it’s what can we do?’” Father Gretchko said. Since then, the Catholic pastor has been given a key and access to the Lutheran church and its inner workings, including the lighting, the air conditioning and other operational necessities. St. Paul’s generosity has been a true blessing in a time of true sorrow, Father Gretchko said. “What do I owe these people?” he asked. “What do I owe them for their love?” ‘Owe no one anything, but love one another,’ says the Scripture. It’s amazing what’s going to happen at that church.” St. Paul’s generous gesture has made it easier for Father Gretchko to work with his parishioners on life celebrations such as weddings and baptisms, he said.

== Establishment of Divine Mercy Parish ==
In November of 2022, it was announced by the Catholic Diocese of Youngstown via press release that St. Mary's would be merging with St. Barbara and St. Joseph Catholic churches in Massillon due to the shortage of priests. The three churches are now collectively known as Divine Mercy Parish. The merger took effect January 1, 2023.
