= Dennison High School =

- U.S. National Register of Historic Places
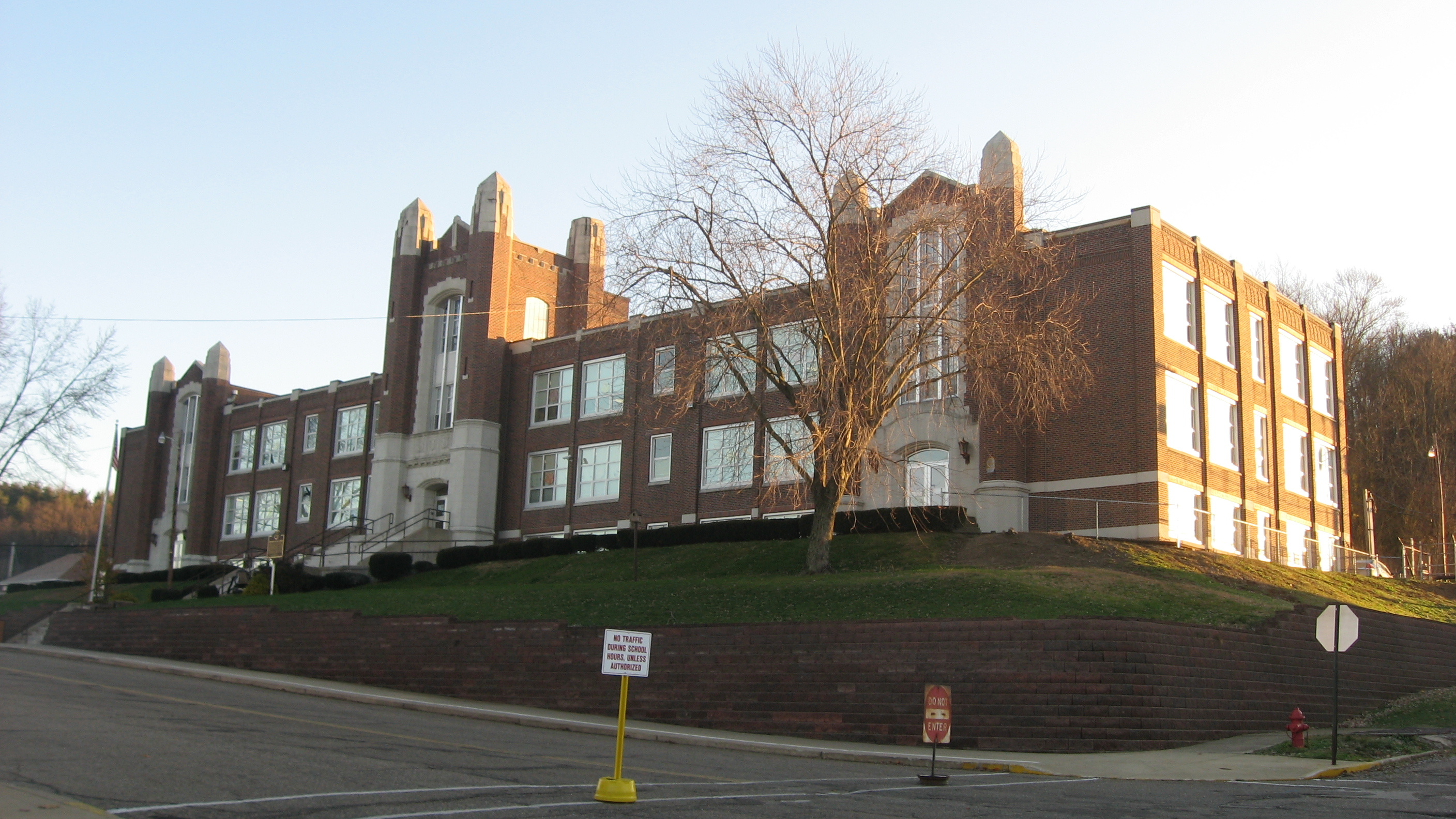
- Dennison High School in 2011.

- Location within Ohio Location within the United States
- Location: 220 N. Third St., Dennison, Ohio
- Coordinates: 40°23′40″N 81°20′01″W
- Area: 1.5 acres (0.61 ha)
- Built: 1928
- Architect: J.K. Griffin; Smith & Shaffer, contractor
- Architectural style: Late Gothic Revival, Collegiate Gothic
- NRHP reference No.: 05001573
- Added to NRHP: February 1, 2006

The Dennison High School is located in Dennison, Ohio. The property was listed on the National Register on 2006-02-01.

== History ==
The building was designed by J.K. Griffin, an architect from Canton in the Gothic style. The building was completed in 1928 and was known as Angel's Castle, named for William Hiram Angel, the superintendent.

The school began an experimental program in the 1930s for "special need students" under teacher Helen Laizure Norris. This "school within a school" was designated as Primrose School and received national attention due to its many innovations. It continued until 1954.

When the schools of the area consolidated, the building was used as the junior high school until it became an intermediate school. The school still functions in this sense today.

== Exterior ==
The red brick building dominates its site. The school sits on top of a small hill towering over the road below. The property is lined by a stone retaining wall with a flight of stairs rising to the main entrance. The main entrance rests in an arched alcove. The surrounding facade is made up of stone and projects away from the main bulk of the building. At each corner of the projection is a rounded buttress. The stone ends in a decorative entablature. Central windows light the interior and are located in a recessed panel and are surrounded by two brick towers capped by stone projections.
