= Canton Public Library =

- U.S. National Register of Historic Places
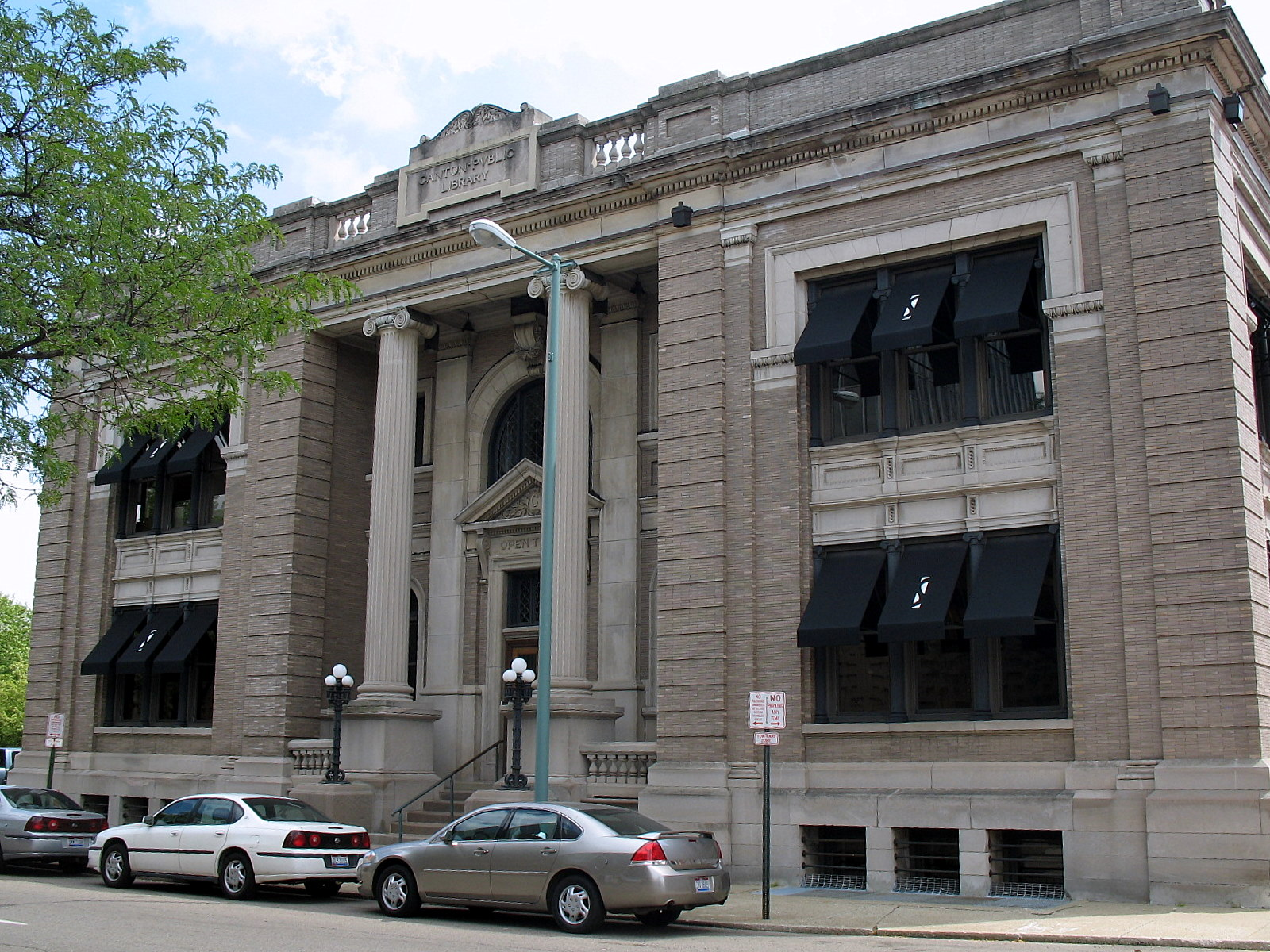

- Location within Ohio Location within the United States
- Interactive map showing the location for Canton Public Library
- Location: 236 3rd St., SW., Canton, Ohio
- Coordinates: 40°47′50″N 81°22′37″W
- Area: less than one acre
- Built: 1903
- Architect: Guy Tilden
- Architectural style: Neo Classical
- MPS: Architecture of Guy Tilden in Canton, 1885–1905, TR
- NRHP reference No.: 82003643
- Added to NRHP: July 15, 1982

The Canton Public Library is a historic Carnegie library building in Canton, Ohio, United States. It was designed by Guy Tilden as the winning entry in a Carnegie library design competition. The library was built in 1903. It was said in 1973 to be "'one of Tilden's designs most admired by present-day architects'" The library moved to another building in 1978, and the original building now houses law offices.It was listed on the National Register of Historic Places in 1982.
