= Hotel Courtland =

Historic building in Canton, Ohio, US

- U.S. National Register of Historic Places
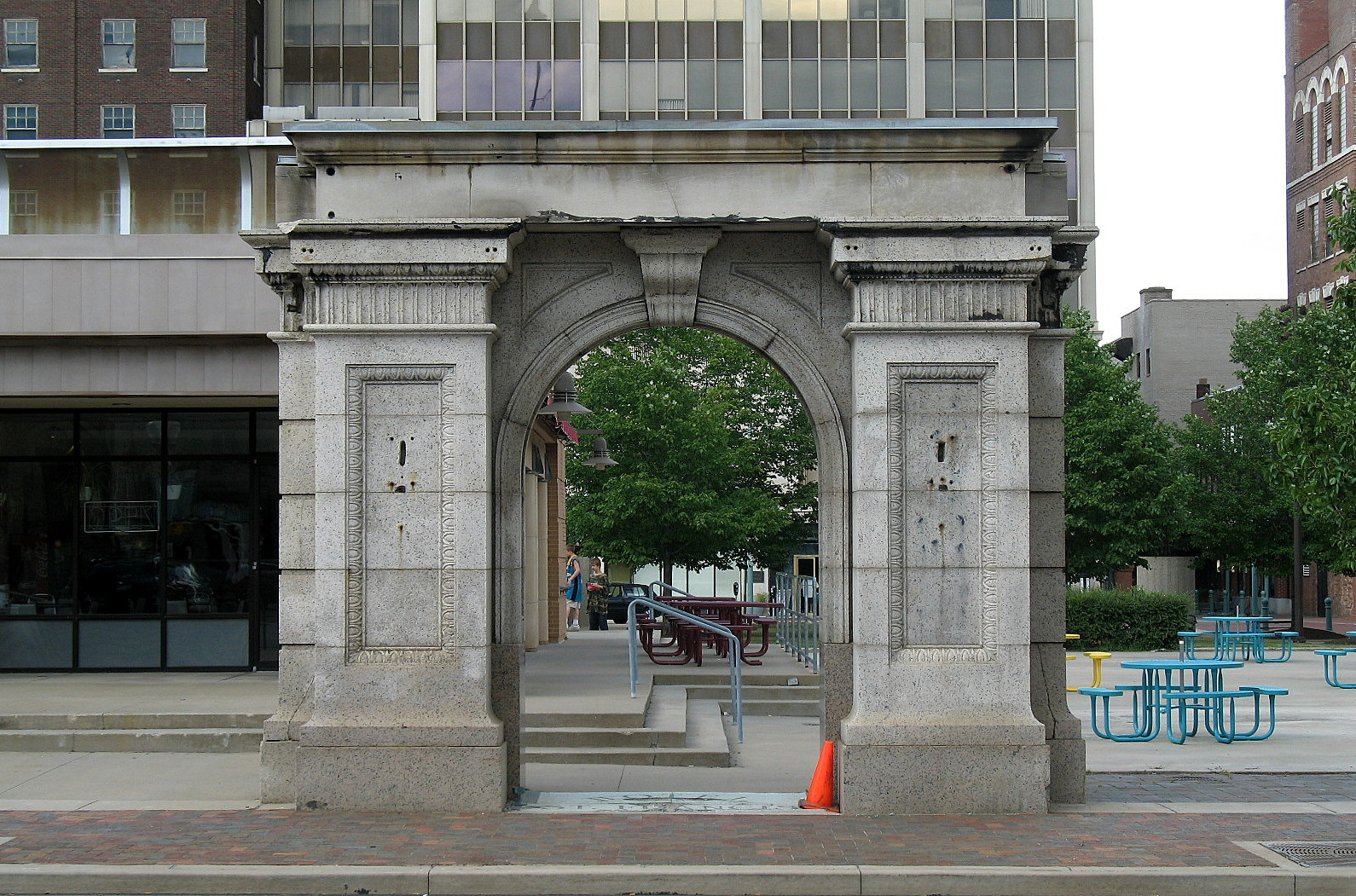
- Remaining arched doorway of Hotel Courtland, 2010

- Location within Ohio Location within the United States
- Location: 209 W. Tuscarawas Ave., Canton, Ohio
- Coordinates: 40°47′56″N 81°22′34″W
- Area: less than one acre
- Built: 1905
- Architect: Tilden, Guy
- Architectural style: Renaissance
- MPS: Architecture of Guy Tilden in Canton, 1885--1905, TR
- NRHP reference No.: 87001195
- Added to NRHP: July 21, 1987

The Hotel Courtland in Canton, Ohio, also or formerly known as St. Francis Hotel and as Stark County Office Building, was built in 1905. It was designed by architect Guy Tilden.

It was listed on the National Register of Historic Places in 1987.
