= Alliance Bank Building =

- U.S. National Register of Historic Places
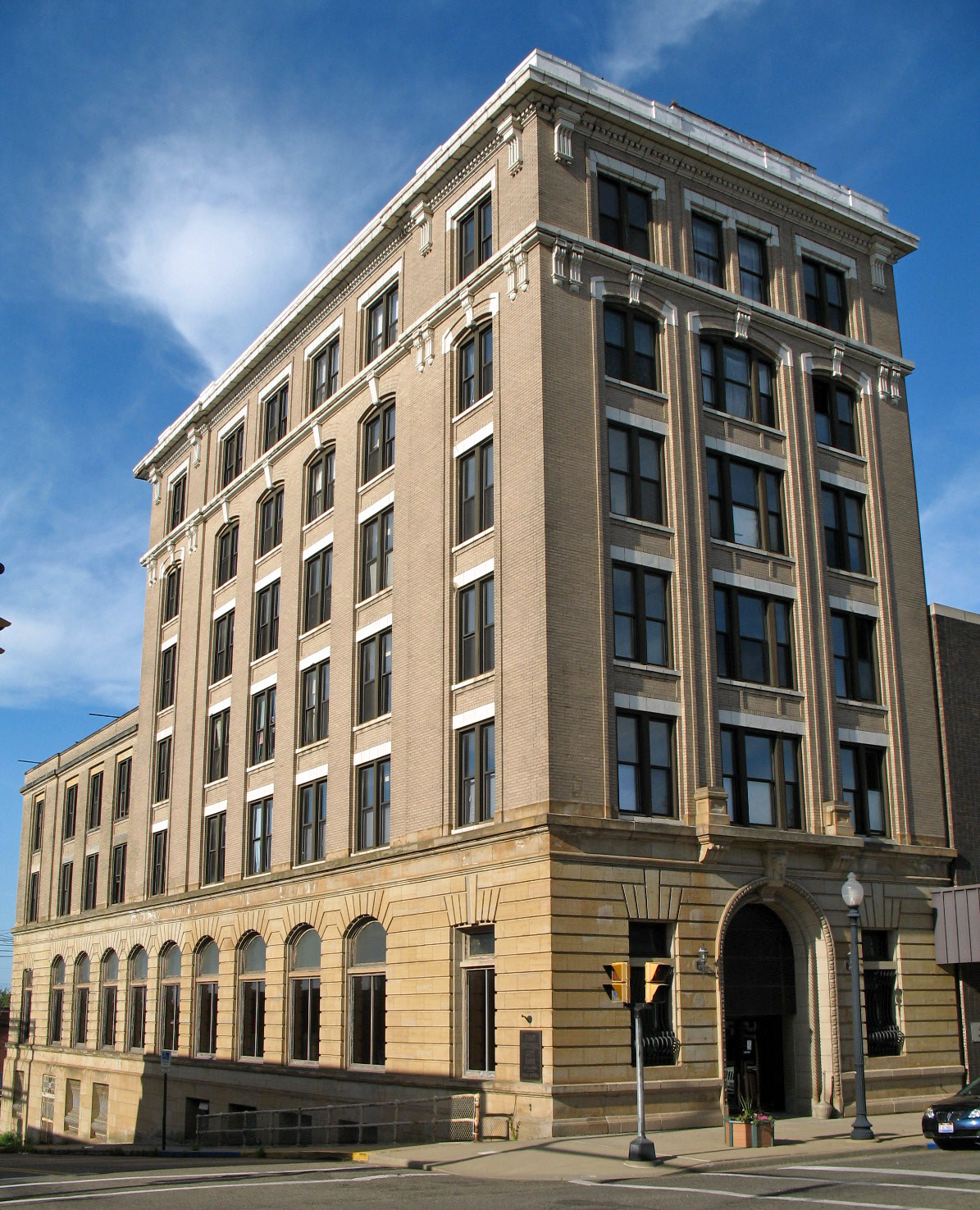
- Pictured in 2008
- Location: 502 East Main Street, Alliance, Ohio
- Coordinates: 40°55′18.47″N 81°5′54.42″W
- Architect: Lewis W. Thomas (original); Walker & Weeks (addition)
- Architectural style: Italian Renaissance Revival
- NRHP reference No.: 95000940
- Added to NRHP: 1995-07-28

The Alliance Bank Building is a historic bank building in Alliance, Ohio, listed on the National Register of Historic Places.

== History ==
The Alliance Bank Company was founded in 1872 and operated out of a different three-story building. The building at 502 East Main Street was built in 1914 (112 years ago), designed by Lewis W. Thomas. In 1923, the Alliance Bank Company merged with First National Bank, and architectural firm Walker and Weeks built an addition at the rear of the building and renovated the interior. The bank occupied the first floor, with the five upper floors as commercial office space. The building was listed on the National Register of Historic Places on July 28, 1995.

== Architecture ==
The building is a six-story structure with a three-story addition at the rear with a matching appearance. The building has an Italian Renaissance Revival style. The first floor and exposed basement are faced in sandstone, with the upper floors faced in sandstone-colored brick.
