= Harry E. Fife House =

Historic house in Ohio, United States

- U.S. National Register of Historic Places
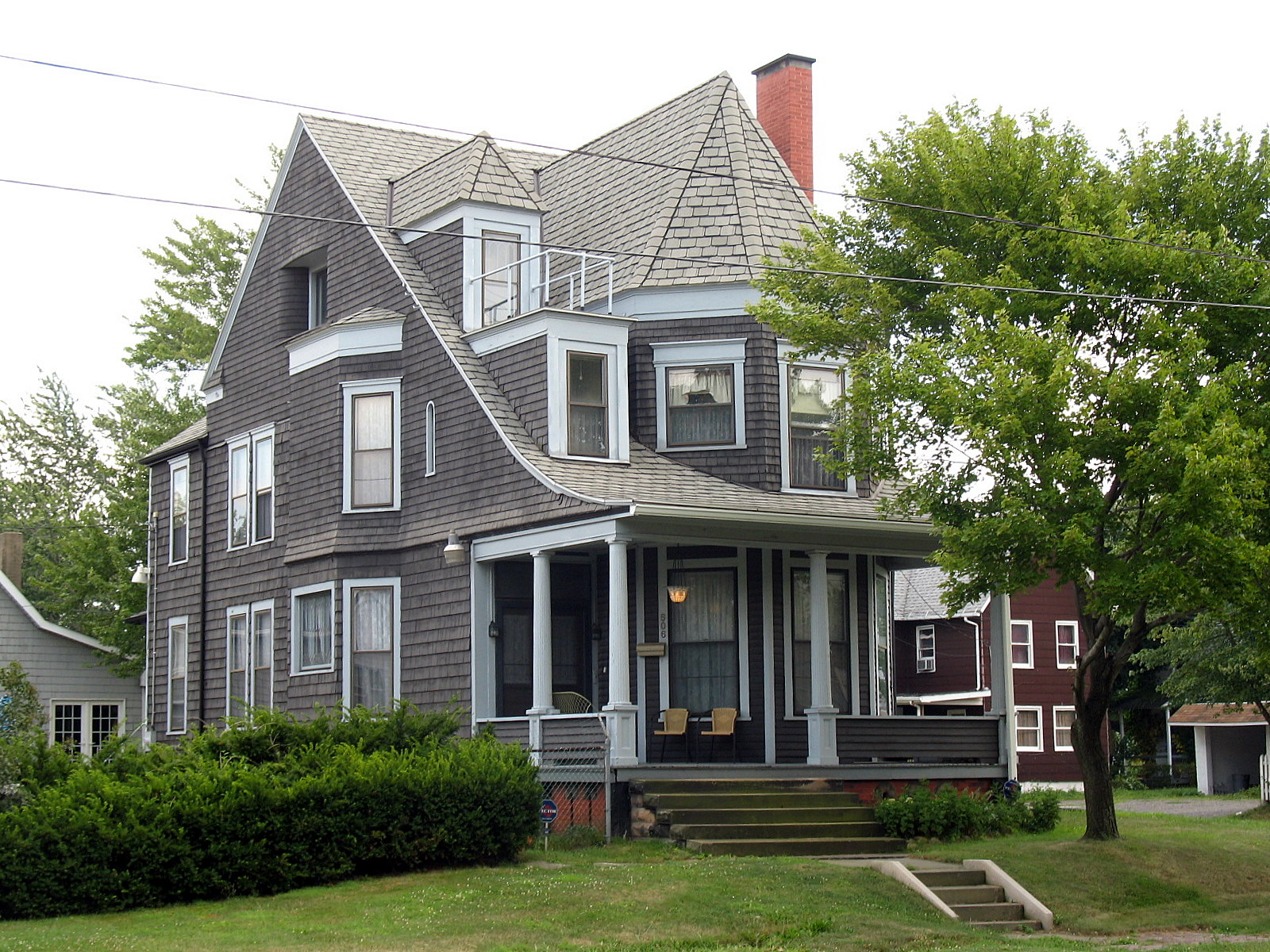

- Location within Ohio Location within the United States
- Interactive map showing the location for Fife House
- Location: 606 McKinley Ave. SW, Canton, Ohio
- Coordinates: 40°47′44″N 81°22′46″W
- Area: less than one acre
- Built: 1896
- Architect: Tilden, Guy
- Architectural style: Shingle Style
- MPS: Architecture of Guy Tilden in Canton, 1885–1905, TR
- NRHP reference No.: 87001196
- Added to NRHP: July 21, 1987

The Harry E. Fife House, also known as Beck Home, is an historic house in Canton, Ohio, that was designed by architect Guy Tilden and was built in 1896. The design "reflects Tilden's enduring love of towers....[and was] [b]uilt for Harry Fife, an early independent insurance man and stock broker".

It was listed on the National Register of Historic Places in 1987.
