= Wilmot, Ohio =

- Village
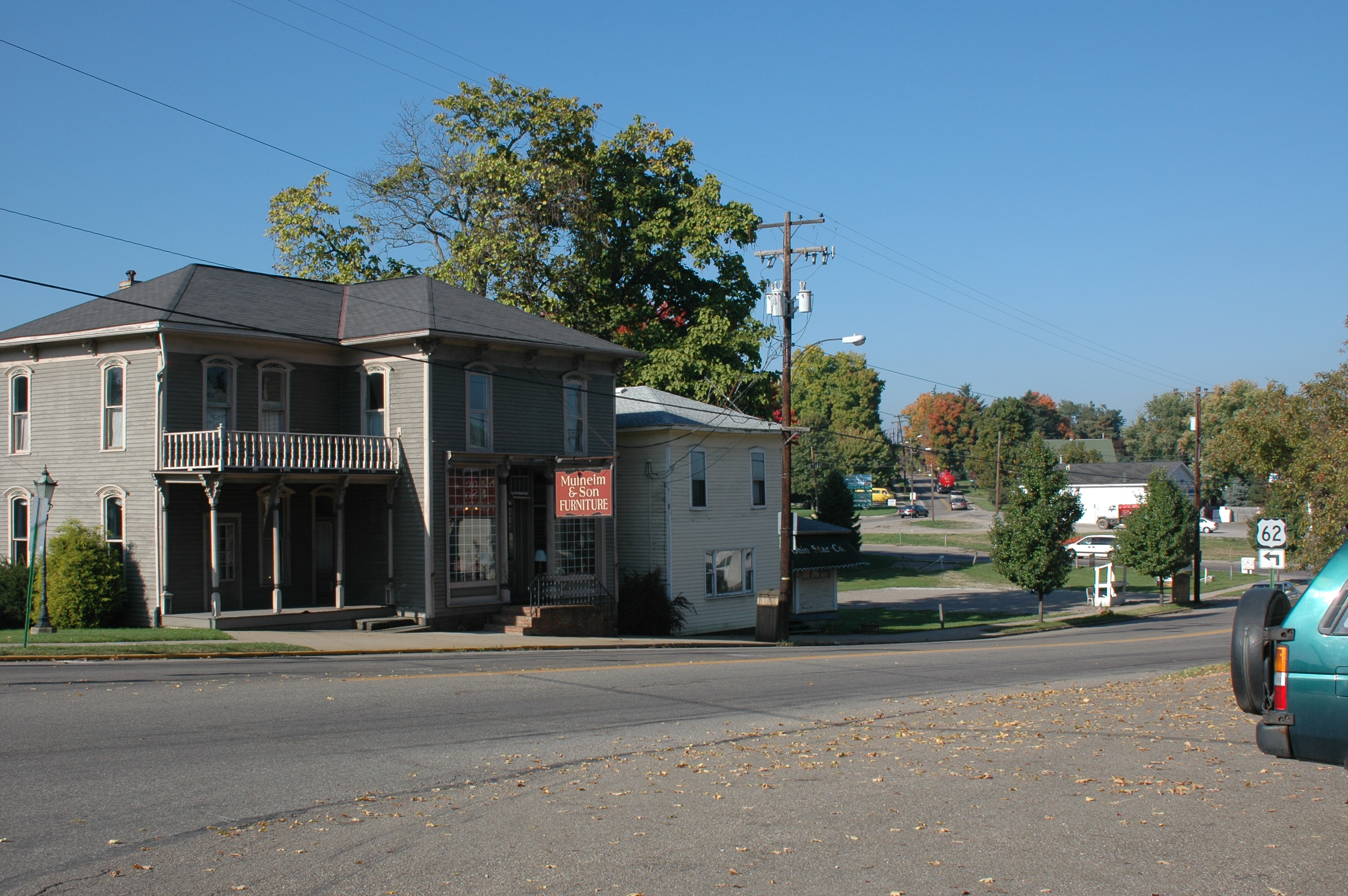
- Streetside in Wilmot

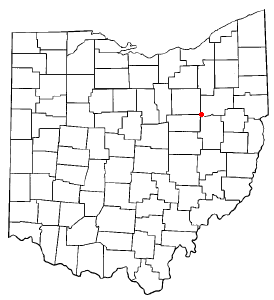
- Location in the state of Ohio

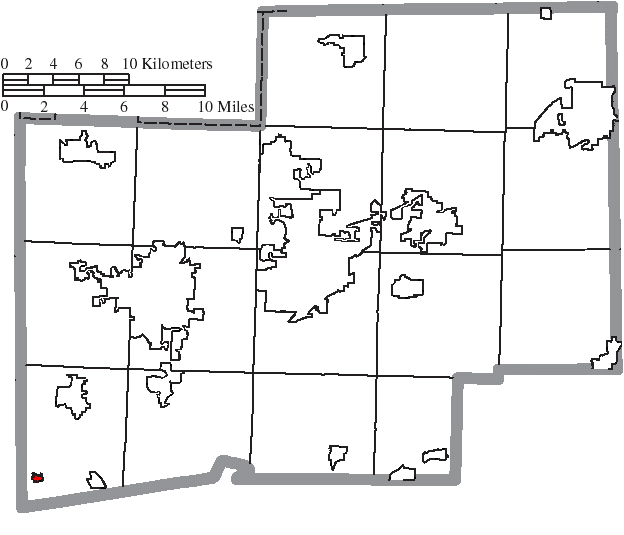
- Location of Wilmot in Stark County
- Coordinates: 40°39′20″N 81°38′05″W
- Country: United States
- State: Ohio
- County: Stark
- Township: Sugar Creek

Area
  - Total: 0.16 sq mi (0.42 km^{2})
  - Land: 0.16 sq mi (0.42 km^{2})
  - Water: 0 sq mi (0.00 km^{2})
- Elevation: 1,034 ft (315 m)

Population (2020)
  - Total: 282
  - Density: 1,721.5/sq mi (664.69/km^{2})
- Time zone: UTC-5 (Eastern (EST))
  - Summer (DST): UTC-4 (EDT)
- FIPS code: 39-85806
- GNIS feature ID: 2399706

Wilmot is a village in southwestern Stark County, Ohio, United States. The population was 282 at the 2020 census. It is part of the Canton–Massillon metropolitan area.

== History ==
Wilmot was originally called Milton, and under the latter name was laid out in 1836. A post office called Wilmot has been in operation since 1866.

== Geography ==
According to the United States Census Bureau, the village has a total area of 0.14 square miles (0.36 km^{2}), all land.

== Demographics ==
Historical population
Census	Pop.	Note	%±
1880	412		—
1900	354		—
1910	258		−27.1%
1920	227		−12.0%
1930	271		19.4%
1940	287		5.9%
1950	354		23.3%
1960	402		13.6%
1970	378		−6.0%
1980	329		−13.0%
1990	261		−20.7%
2000	335		28.4%
2010	304		−9.3%
2020	282		−7.2%
U.S. Decennial Census

=== 2010 census ===
As of the census of 2010, there were 304 people, 118 households, and 84 families living in the village. The population density was 2,171.4 inhabitants per square mile (838.4/km^{2}). There were 136 housing units at an average density of 971.4 per square mile (375.1/km^{2}). The racial makeup of the village was 98.0% White, 0.3% African American, 0.3% Asian, and 1.3% from two or more races. Hispanic or Latino of any race were 0.3% of the population.

There were 118 households, of which 37.3% had children under the age of 18 living with them, 52.5% were married couples living together, 11.0% had a female householder with no husband present, 7.6% had a male householder with no wife present, and 28.8% were non-families. 26.3% of all households were made up of individuals, and 9.3% had someone living alone who was 65 years of age or older. The average household size was 2.58 and the average family size was 3.00.

The median age in the village was 31.7 years. 27.3% of residents were under the age of 18; 8.9% were between the ages of 18 and 24; 29.3% were from 25 to 44; 25.3% were from 45 to 64; and 9.2% were 65 years of age or older. The gender makeup of the village was 52.6% male and 47.4% female.

=== 2000 census ===
As of the census of 2000, there were 335 people, 124 households, and 89 families living in the village. The population density was 2,038.5 inhabitants per square mile (787.1/km^{2}). There were 135 housing units at an average density of 821.5 per square mile (317.2/km^{2}). The racial makeup of the village was 99.10% White, 0.30% Native American, 0.30% Asian, and 0.30% from two or more races.

There were 124 households, out of which 37.1% had children under the age of 18 living with them, 61.3% were married couples living together, 5.6% had a female householder with no husband present, and 28.2% were non-families. 21.8% of all households were made up of individuals, and 8.9% had someone living alone who was 65 years of age or older. The average household size was 2.70 and the average family size was 3.17.

In the village, the population was spread out, with 29.6% under the age of 18, 9.3% from 18 to 24, 34.3% from 25 to 44, 18.2% from 45 to 64, and 8.7% who were 65 years of age or older. The median age was 32 years. For every 100 females there were 95.9 males. For every 100 females age 18 and over, there were 93.4 males.

The median income for a household in the village was $38,750, and the median income for a family was $39,063. Males had a median income of $31,042 versus $26,406 for females. The per capita income for the village was $14,141. About 3.5% of families and 6.6% of the population were below the poverty line, including 4.9% of those under age 18 and 12.0% of those age 65 or over.
