= Case Mansion =

Historic house in Ohio, United States

- Formerly listed on the U.S. National Register of Historic Places
- Location: 1717 N. Market Ave., Canton, Ohio
- Area: less than one acre
- Built: 1902
- Architect: Guy Tilden
- Architectural style: Richardsonian Romanesque
- MPS: Architecture of Guy Tilden in Canton, 1885--1905, TR
- NRHP reference No.: 87001191
- Removed from NRHP: July 26, 1990

The Case Mansion in Canton, Ohio, was a historic work of architect Guy Tilden. It was listed on the National Register of Historic Places, but removed from the National Register in 1990 after being demolished.
