= Youngstown Fire Department =

Emergency services in Ohio, United States

Operational area
- Country: United States
- State: Ohio
- City: Youngstown

Agency overview
- Established: 1868
- Fire chief: Michael Good
- IAFF: 312

Facilities and equipment
- Battalions: 2
- Stations: 9
- Engines: 5
- Platforms: 2
- Quints: 1
- Rescues: 1
- Rescue boats: 1

Website
- Official website
- IAFF website

The Youngstown Fire Department provides fire protection and emergency medical services to the city of Youngstown, Ohio. The department is responsible for 34 square miles (88 km^{2}) with a population of 64,734 people as of the 2014-2018 American Community Survey. The daytime population expands to 75,917 people. The department currently has 122 members.

== History ==
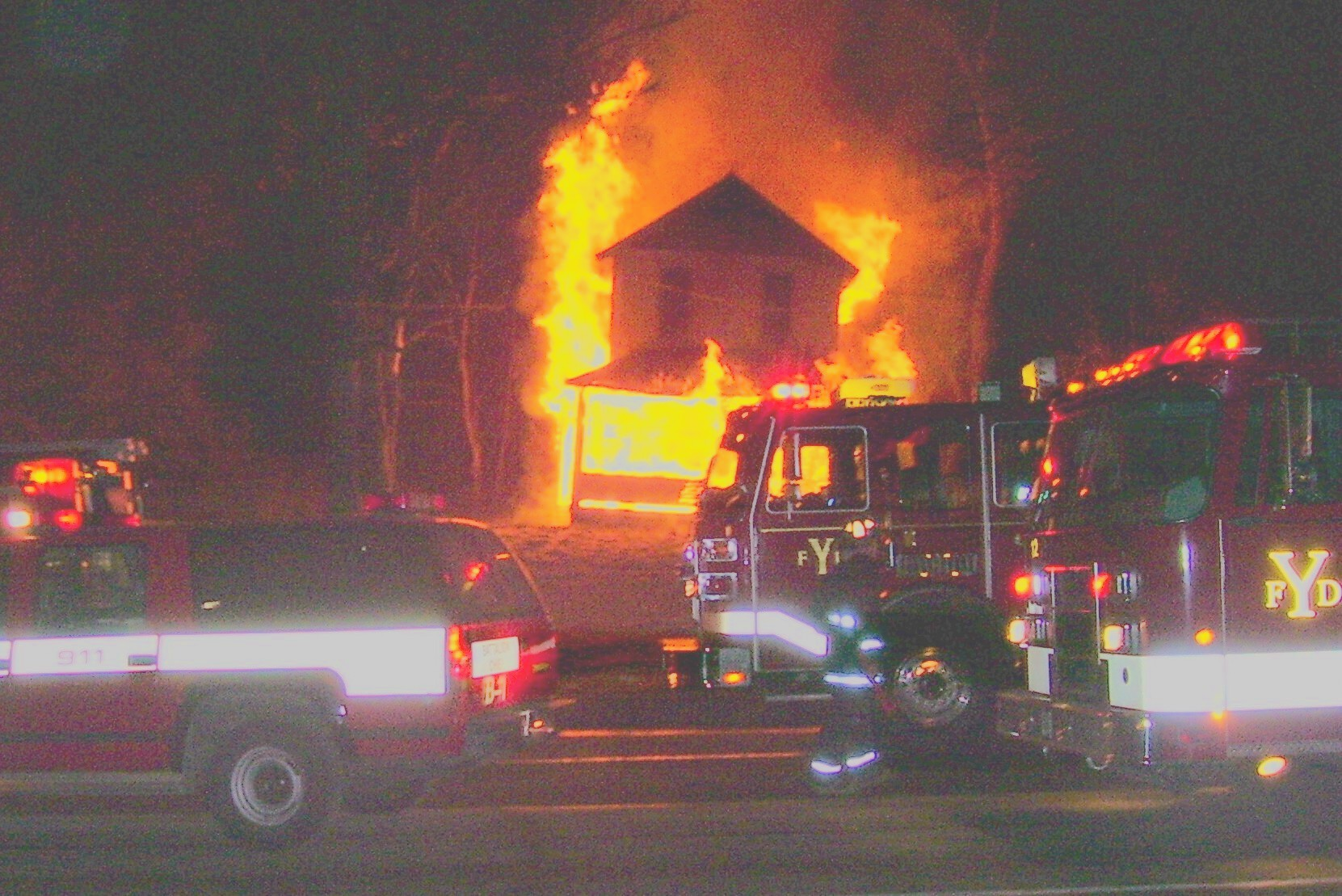
The Youngstown Fire Department fighting an arson fire on the city's North Side.

Established in 1868 as the all-volunteer Governor Tod Engine Company, the department has grown over the years. In 1891, the volunteer department was disbanded as the city grew and the need for a full-time force of career firefighters became evident. By 1955, the department had grown to operate from 15 fire stations, but this would last only 15 years. By the early 1970s, with the steel industry on its way out of Youngstown, the department began to close companies. First were Fire Stations 4 and 11. Others would follow, including Stations 5, 7, 8, 10, 13, and 14.

The Youngstown Fire Department led all cities of similar size in arson fires in 2012. Youngstown has had problems with vacant structure fires for several decades. The Youngstown Fire Department had over 400 structure fires in 2014.

== Stations and apparatus ==
As of December 2019 below is a list of all stations and apparatus used by the Youngstown Fire Department.

| Fire Station Number | Neighborhood | Engine Company | Ladder Company | Special Unit | Chief Unit |
|---|---|---|---|---|---|
| 1 | Downtown | Engine 7 | Ladder 22 | Rope Rescue Truck | Battalion 1 |
| 2 | Fosterville/South Side | Engine 2 | Ladder 24 | | Battalion 2 |
| 3 | West Side | | | Rescue 3 Fire Boat 1 | |
| 6 | East Side | Engine 6 | | | |
| 7 | Wick Park | | | Closed | |
| 9 | Brownlee Woods | Engine 9[Quint] | | | |
| 12 | Scienceville/East Side | Engine 12 | | | |
| 14 | Flint Hill | | | Closed | |
| 15 | West Side | Engine 15 | | | |
