= Schenley (disambiguation) =

Schenley is a neighborhood of Youngstown, Ohio. It may also refer to:

== People ==
- Edward Wyndham Harrington Schenley (1799–1878), British politician, husband of Mary Schenley
- Mary Schenley (1826–1903), American heiress, philanthropist to the city of Pittsburgh

== Other uses ==
- Schenley, Pennsylvania, United States, an unincorporated community
- Schenley Bridge, Pittsburgh, Pennsylvania
- Schenley Tunnel, Pittsburgh, a railroad tunnel
- Schenley High School, Pittsburgh
- Schenley Hotel, Pittsburgh, a former hotel, now the student union building of the University of Pittsburgh main campus
- Schenley Park, Pittsburgh, a municipal park
- Schenley Plaza, Pittsburgh, a park serving as the entrance to Schenley Park
- Schenley Quadrangle, Pittsburgh, a cluster of University of Pittsburgh residence halls
- Schenley Industries, a former liquor company based in New York City
- Schenley Award, original name of the Canadian Football League's Most Outstanding Player Award, named after the company

== See also ==
- Shenley (disambiguation)
