= Youngstown Foundation Amphitheatre =

Outdoor amphitheater in Youngstown, Ohio

Coordinates: 41°05′51″N 80°39′11″W

- The Amp
- Interactive map of Youngstown Foundation Amphitheatre
- Address: 201 South Phelps Street
- Location: Youngstown
- Owner: JAC Management Group
- Seating type: reserved, lawn
- Capacity: approx. 4800
- Type: Outdoor amphitheatre

Construction
- Opened: June 14, 2019

Website
- theyoungstownfoundationamp.com

The Youngstown Foundation Amphitheatre is an outdoor amphitheater in Youngstown, Ohio, United States. The venue holds approximately 4,800 fans. It is owned by the city of Youngstown and operated by JAC Management Group.

== History ==
The origins of the project date to early 2015, during the administration of Mayor John McNally IV. The abandoned Wean United complex was demolished in 2014 and the city soon began to plan for future development on the property. The addition of the Youngstown Foundation Amphitheatre has allowed for members of the community to experience the vast green spaces of Wean Park, all while having the perks of downtown Youngstown right at your fingertips.

=== Wean Park ===
A riverside greenspace has been developed contemporaneously around the amphitheater on the previously industrial-zoned land. It is officially named "The Raymond John Wean Foundation Park," as a result of a 15-year naming deal.
