= Shenley (disambiguation) =

Shenley is a village in Hertfordshire, England.

Shenley may also refer to:

== Places ==
- Shenley, Milton Keynes, Buckinghamshire, England
- Shenley, Quebec, Saint-Honoré-de-Shenley, Canada
- Shenley Green, Birmingham, West Midlands, England
- Shenley railway station, a former station at Canterbury, Melbourne, Australia

== Other uses ==
- Shenley Academy, a secondary school in Weoley Castle, Birmingham, England

== See also ==
- Schenley (disambiguation)
