= Oakland Center for the Arts =

Arts center in Youngstown, Ohio, U.S.A

Coordinates: 41°06′03″N 80°39′11″W

The Oakland Center for the Arts (or the Oakland, as it is usually called) is an interdisciplinary arts center based in Youngstown, Ohio founded in 1986.

== Founding ==
The center was first supported by Youngstown businessman Richard Rosenthal and founded by Youngstown native Alexandra Vansuch, with support from local performers and civic minded individuals, as a community venue for theater, film, music, literature, dance, and the visual arts.

== Naming ==
The organization took its name from one of Rosenthal's buildings, the former Oakland Motor Car dealership on Mahoning Avenue, where he donated space for the fledgling organization. Rosenthal's early role was honored when the center moved to a new space in the Morley Building and designated a space for art named the Star Gallery after his business Star Supply Company.

== Activities ==
The center specialized in performing locally written plays, as well as offbeat, obscure plays and musicals such as Bat Boy: The Musical, Baby, Jacques Brel is Alive and Well and Living in Paris, and Assassins. Their award winning work gained them local and regional acclaim.

== History ==
In the 1990s, the center joined the Ballet Western Reserve in the renovation of the community's former Elks Building.

In early 2000s, the Oakland broke new ground in the world of Youngstown community theater when the center's production of Love, Valor, Compassion! with full male nudity to sell out crowds

In 2014, The Oakland joined a short list of theaters which have performed the musical Bare: A Pop Opera before serious financial problems, which eventually led to the loss of its long time space in the Morley Building. The Oakland announced in March 2015 that they would no longer be producing theatrical productions for an extended period of time, primarily due to mismanagement by the board of directors at the time.

In 2015 The Oakland announced a new board of directors, and the addition of the Oakland's Kids First Theatre Initiative, a free educationally based theatre program housed in Boardman. The successful program put the Oakland once again on firm financial footing.

For the 2018 season the Oakland announced a program for seniors during the daytime hours, and will provide catered lunches and shows for senior groups.

The Oakland continues to produce theatrical productions.
