= Powers Auditorium =

- Warner Theater
- U.S. National Register of Historic Places
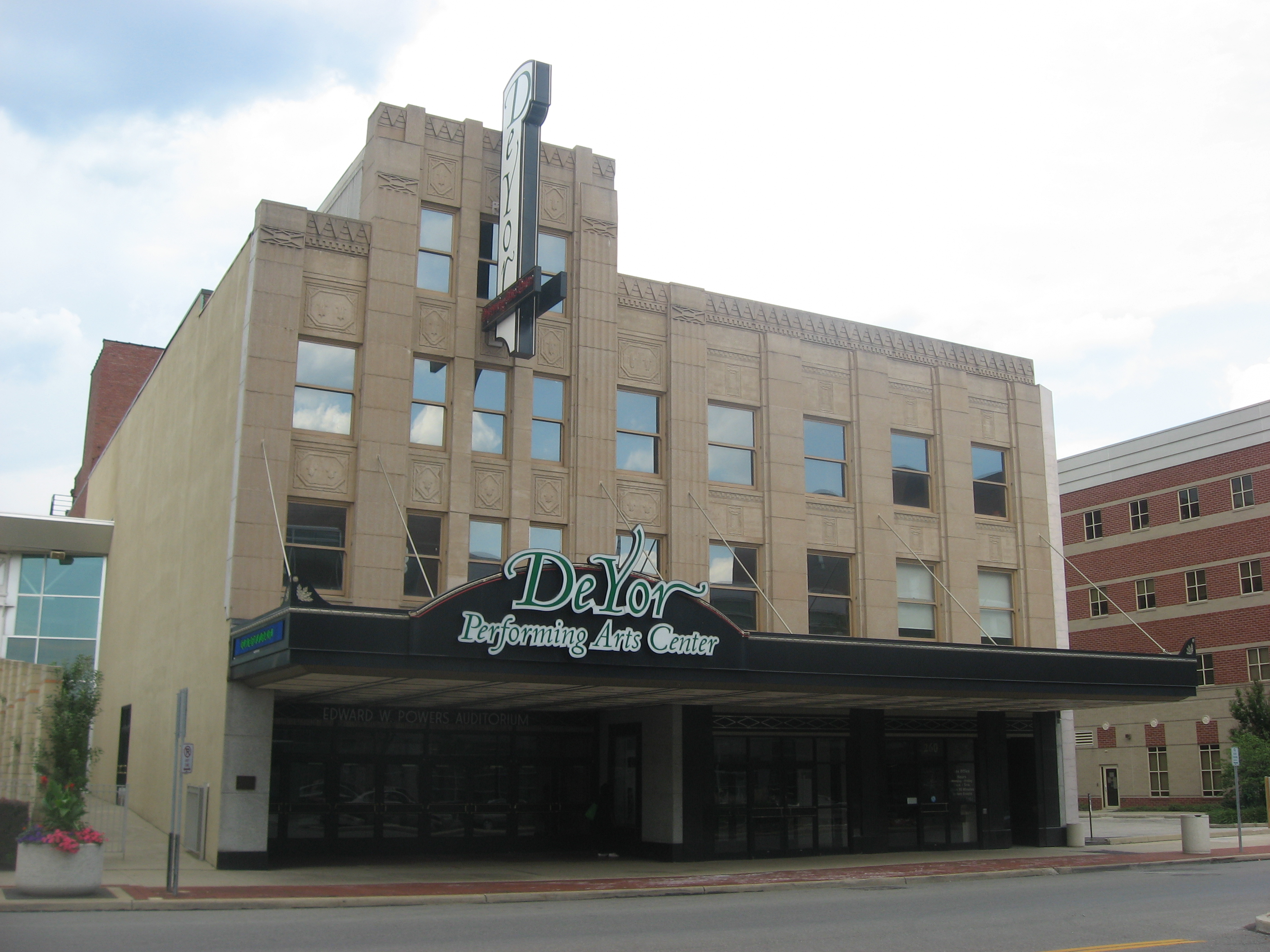
- Federal Plaza façade

- Location within Ohio Location within the United States
- Location: 260 West Federal Plaza, Youngstown, Ohio
- Coordinates: 41°6′8″N 80°39′12″W
- Area: less than one acre
- Built: 1930
- Architect: Rapp & Rapp; Heller Bros.
- NRHP reference No.: 80003152
- Added to NRHP: May 31, 1980

Powers Auditorium is an auditorium in downtown Youngstown, Ohio, United States. The facility is the main venue of the DeYor Performing Arts Center. It was built in 1931 as the Warner Theatre, a part of the Warner Bros. theatre chain. The former movie palace was renovated and reopened as Powers Auditorium in 1969 and was listed on the National Register of Historic Places in 1980.

The main tenant of Powers Auditorium is the Youngstown Symphony Orchestra, which performs from October through May annually. The facility also hosts other musical acts, touring Broadway theatre productions and locally produced theater (primarily from Ballet Western Reserve and Easy Street Productions, two Youngstown-based theater companies).

== History ==
Designed by the prominent theater architects Rapp and Rapp, Powers opened as the Warner Theatre on May 14, 1931, part of the massive chain of theaters operated by the Warner Bros. film company. The structure was built as a memorial to the late Sam Warner, who along with his brothers, resided in Youngstown before embarking on a career in film production. The Warner Theatre operated until 1968, when it was scheduled to be demolished to make way for a parking lot. A public outcry prompted the Edward W. Powers family to donate $250,000 to preserve the structure. The theater was preserved and renovated in 1969. Many items in the theater were auctioned off, and the auditorium underwent extensive acoustical renovation in order to make it a suitable concert hall. In September of that year, the building was re-christened as Powers Auditorium with a performance by the Youngstown Symphony.

The former movie theater is included on the National Register of Historic Places in 1980. In 2000, a new East Wing was completed, giving the Symphony a music library and administrative office, as well as an elevator and equipment that brought Powers up to standard in handicap accessibility. Recently completed is the Beecher Flad Pavilion, which comprises the Ford Recital Hall, a 600-seat auditorium for orchestra, brass, and choral performances; new kitchen facilities; new dressing rooms; expanded loading docks; and soundproofing so that Powers and the new auditorium can be used simultaneously. Powers Auditorium can hold a capacity crowd of 2,303.

== See also ==
- List of concert halls
