= Brownlee Woods =

Coordinates: 41°03′26″N 80°37′29″W

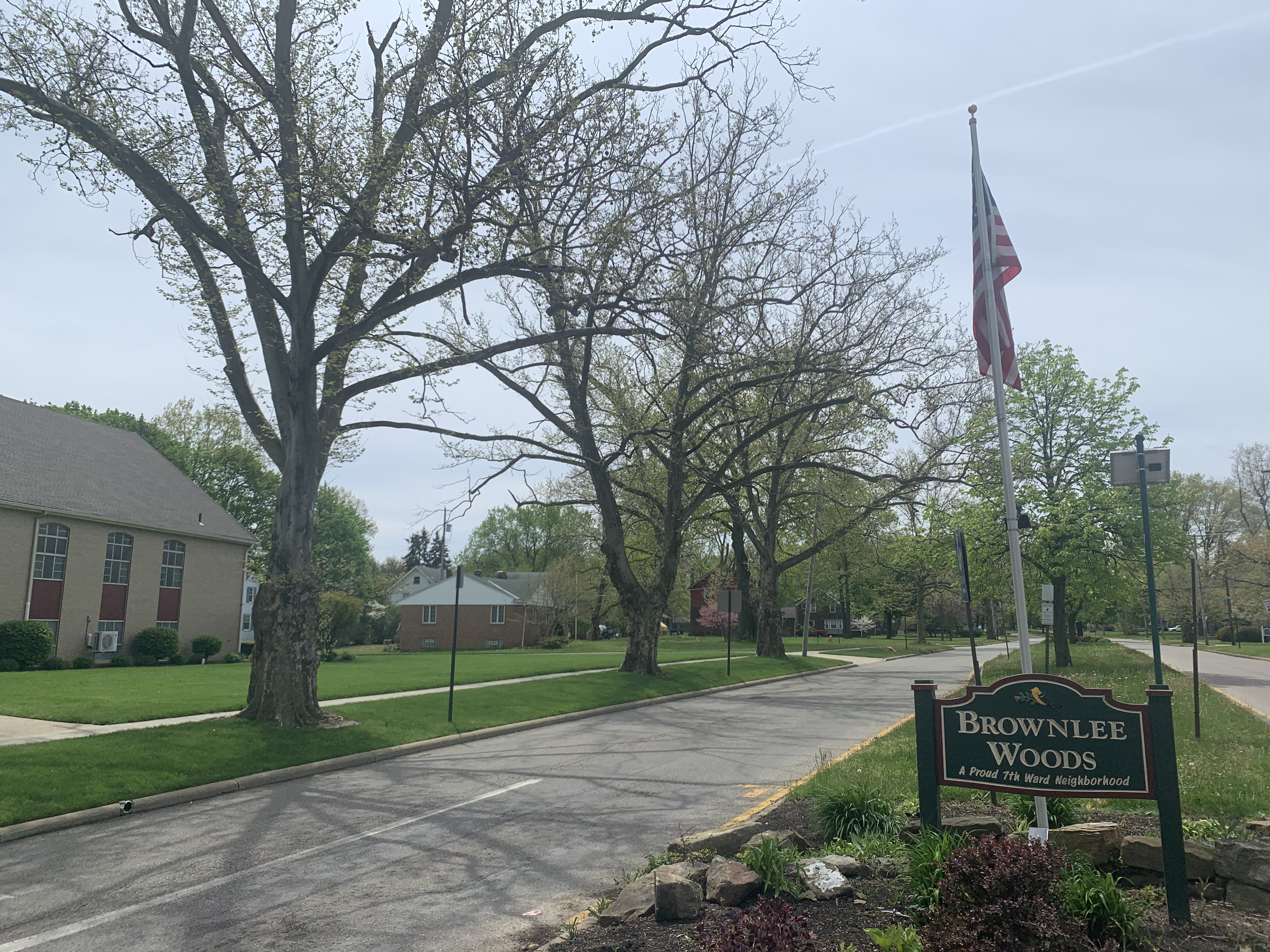
- Interactive map of Brownlee Woods
- Country: United States
- State: Ohio
- County: Mahoning
- City: Youngstown

Brownlee Woods is a neighborhood in Youngstown, Ohio. The neighborhood is bordered by Struthers to the east, Interstate 680 to the west, Boardman to the south, and Midlothian Blvd to the north.

== History ==
Brownlee Woods was named after James Brownlee, a farmer who purchased 235 acres of land in the area.

The neighborhood is located near Paul C. Bunn Elementary School, and also contains a playground, the Brownlee Woods Library, and several churches. Most of the homes are single-family housing that are owned.

== Residents ==
Most of the residents are working-class. In the early days of establishment, many residents were employed by the steel mills of LTV Steel, Youngstown Sheet and Tube, and Republic Steel. Residents of the area were used to the train whistles echoing from Struthers, Ohio and Campbell, Ohio in the middle of the night up, until the late 1970s when most of the mills closed. Many of the residents of the neighborhood are older and are retired.

== Architecture ==
The homes of Brownlee Woods mark two distinct periods of time: the late 1910s through the 1920s, and the post war 1950s. The homes from Midlothian Blvd to Bancroft represent older midsize Colonial and Bungalow style of homes. The side streets from Bancroft on to Country Club Ave are newer post war Ranches and Cape Cod houses. The main boulevard, Sheridan, which runs through the heart of the neighborhood, pulls from a mixture of architecture styles from large Colonial, Tudor, Victorian, to even Craftsman style homes.

== Schools ==
The public elementary school for residents in Brownlee Woods is Paul C. Bunn Elementary School, located on Sequoya Drive in the southern portion of the neighborhood. The original school building operated from the early 1960s up until about 2007 when it was demolished to make way for a new school under the same name.

The Montessori School of the Mahoning Valley is located on Lynn Avenue. Founded in 1976, MSMV is a non-profit corporation that operates as a parent co-operative and is governed by a Board of Trustees, following the philosophy of and have adopted the methods of Dr. Maria Montessori.

== See also ==
- Youngstown Neighborhoods
- Youngstown Sheet and Tube
