= Youngstown Symphony Orchestra =

American symphony orchestra

The Youngstown Symphony is a symphony orchestra based in Youngstown, Ohio. Based in downtown Youngstown's Powers Auditorium, the symphony has been performing classical music for Youngstown and the Mahoning Valley since 1926. Randall Craig Fleischer was the music director until his death in 2020.

The Youngstown Symphony performs ten concerts annually, from October through May. They perform a combination of "masterworks series" and "pops series" concerts. In addition to these concerts, the symphony performs Young People's Concerts for school children, as well as a concert for preschoolers, called Storytime in School Music.

== Youngstown Symphony Society ==
The Youngstown Symphony Society is an organization of area residents who donate to the Society Operating Fund. The society sponsors symphony events, promotes the symphony, volunteers with the symphony and its other projects, and assists with the symphony's future plans.
