= John Young (pioneer) =

American surveyor and pioneer

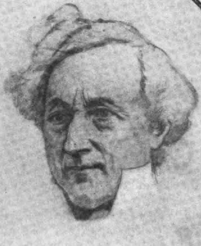
- Born: March 8, 1764; Peterborough, Province of New Hampshire, British America
- Died: 1825 (aged 60–61); Whitestown, New York, U.S.
- Occupation: Surveyor
- Known for: Founder of Youngstown, Ohio

John Young (March 8, 1764 – 1825) was an American surveyor and pioneer. He is best known as the founder of Youngstown, Ohio, a village that eventually became one of the nation's largest steel producers.

== Early years ==
John Young was born in Peterborough, New Hampshire and moved to Whitestown, New York, where he married Mary Stone White, the daughter of Whitestown's founder, Hugh White. In 1796, John Young moved with his wife and their son, John Young Jr. to what would become Ohio while he surveyed the area, and settled there soon after. Also in 1796, Young and a party of surveyors made their first visit to the future site of Youngstown, Ohio, an area that Young had considered purchasing. On February 9, 1797, he purchased the entire township of 15,560 acres (63 km²) from the Western Reserve Land Company for $16,085 through a land contact, though the official conveyance was not completed until April 9, 1800, as Young and the Western Reserve Land Company were still negotiating. The 1797 establishment of the town was officially recorded on August 19, 1802. Young lived in the area from 1799 to 1803.

== Pioneer in Ohio and return to New York State ==
The Youngs had their son George during their time in Ohio, but they eventually returned to Whitestown due to Mary's health in 1803.

== Death and family ==
Young died in Whitestown in 1825. The Youngs' had three sons, John Young Jr (1794-1875), who later became a Commodore in the United States Navy, William Clark Young (1799-1893), US Army Colonel and surveyor and George Young (1796-1828).
