= Fosterville =

Neighborhood in Youngstown, Ohio, United States

Coordinates: 41°4′40″N 80°40′30″W

Fosterville is a neighborhood in Youngstown, Ohio, that is located on the south-southwestern side of the city. In the course of a recent revitalization effort, called "Youngstown 2010," the original Fosterville neighborhood has been subdivided into two distinct neighborhood areas: Idora and Warren.

== History ==
Once a 300-acre (1.2 km^{2}) farm owned by the L. T. Foster family (located at the present-day location where Indianola Avenue and Canfield Road meet Glenwood Avenue,) this area once had one of the most productive coal mines in the country. Many of the other south-side Youngstown neighborhoods had coal mines, but the coal from the Fosterville mine was so prized that it won a gold medal at the Centennial Exposition in Philadelphia. The last mine was closed in 1915 when all of the coal was extracted.

The neighborhood converted from farmland to residential housing in the early 1900s. This occurred due to the introduction of the new South Side trolley-car line in 1899 (owned by the Youngstown Park and Falls Street Railway Company). The line ran out of downtown Youngstown to the South Side's Fosterville neighborhood near Mill Creek Park and Lanterman's Mill. People were encouraged to use the new trolley line when the railway company built an amusement park (opening 1899) at end of the trolley line.

The urban amusement park, Idora Park, was located in the north-western portion of the Fosterville neighborhood and encouraged the growth of residential housing. The Volney Road section of this neighborhood, bordering Idora Park, was developed by the wealthy. Housing developed closer to Glenwood Avenue was almost entirely upper-middle-class. Fosterville's Idora Park closed in 1984, yet had long outlived the trolley-line that stopped operations many years earlier. The urban renewal plans of Youngstown 2010 call for this former amusement park land to remain as vacant green-space and part of the citywide green network.

Although Youngstown's economic downturn in the 1970s and suburban flight directly impacted the Fosterville neighborhood, it was Idora Park's closing that was the death knell for many of the South Side businesses. The geographic location of Fosterville positioned the neighborhood to be a grand thoroughfare to the many entrances of Mill Creek Park such as Old Furnace Road. Lake Glacier was a primary getaway spot for generations. The Fosterville neighborhood saw the closing of many long-lived businesses in the 1980s: Parker's Frozen Custard, JB's Lounge, the Crystal Lounge, Mr. Paul's Bakery, Isaly's Dairy, Foster Theater, Sparkle's Supermarket and the Park Inn. Nested in the middle of Fosterville was The Youngstown Playhouse, Chicago Street Athletic Field which saw its heyday with the school-aged baby boom of the 1960s, and the historical Fosterville postal substation. The historical residents of Fosterville maintained what was known as 'land covenants' in an effort to prevent the influx of non-white immigrating citizens from disturbing the neighborhood's planned integrity as had been maintained with the return of World War II veterans who settled in the neighborhood post-1930s. The architecture of the neighborhoods from the 1930s to 1960 is prevalent in the older existing homes - what few remain. Enclosed porches and coal chutes to cellar spaces beneath the homes were prevalent qualities. Rounded Dutch barn-shaped three story homes were commonplace. The texture of the post-war generation is evident between Hillman Street and Glenwood Avenue and Willis bordering on the north and Indianola to the south.

== Summary of coal mines ==
Summary of productive mines in the Fosterville neighborhood:

- Foster No.1 Mine (1873-1884) operated by the Foster Coal Company; produced 400 tons/day and was the most productive of all South Side Youngstown mines; original entrance located just east of current home at 537 Hylda Street; shaft currently capped with 12-inch (300 mm) concrete with reinforced one-inch steel bars.
- Foster No.2 Mine (1885-1887) operated by the Foster Coal Company; produced a total of 40,000 tons; original entrance located at the present-day southwest corner of Glenwood Ave. and Parkway; shaft currently covered with concrete.
