= Youngstown, Ohio =

- City
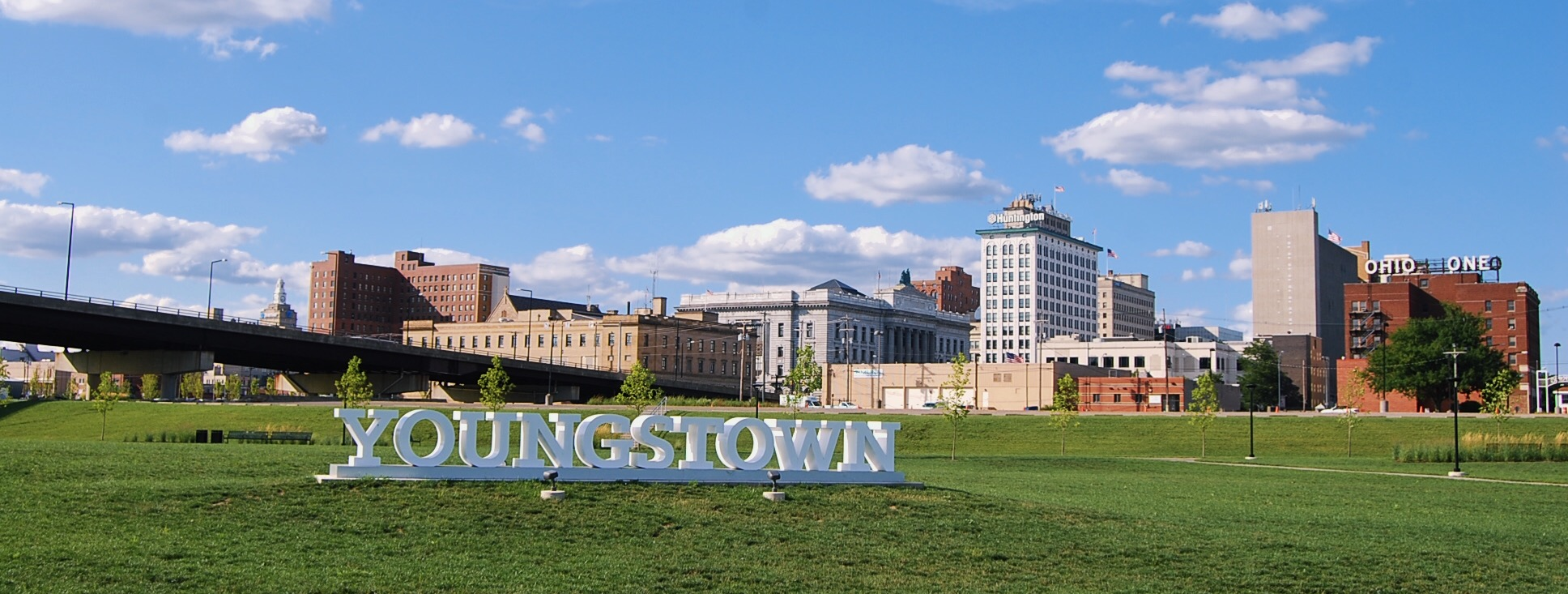
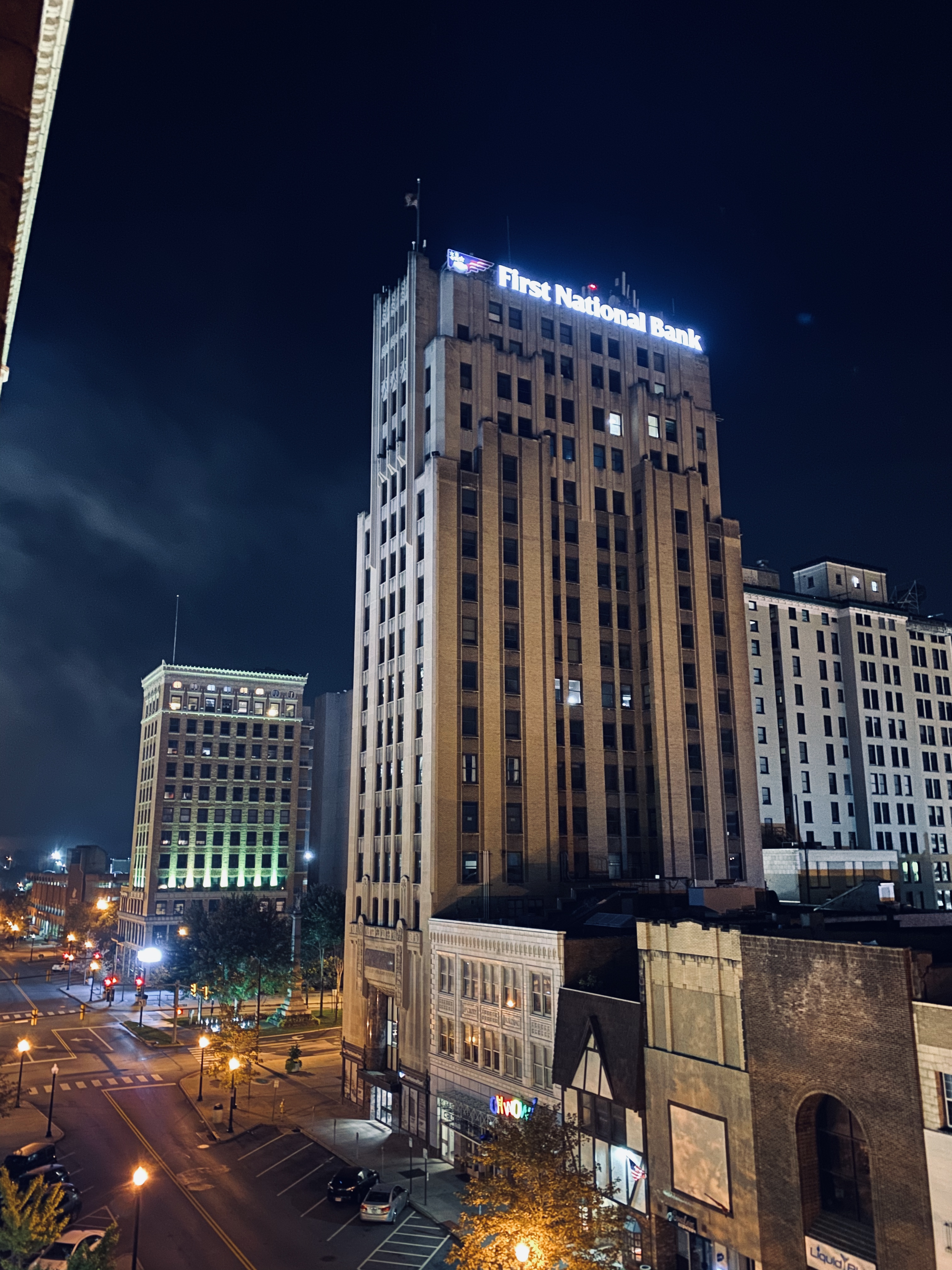
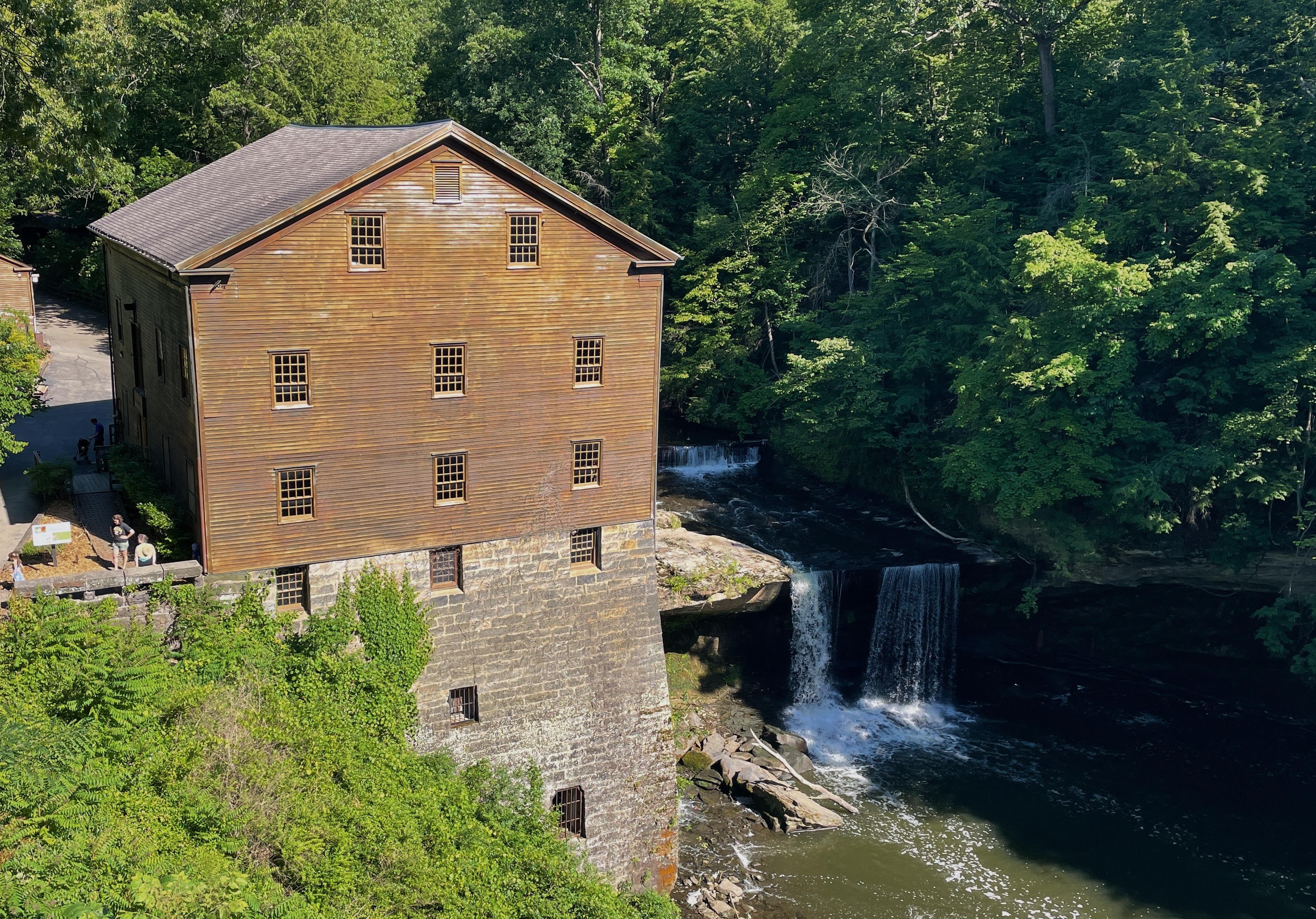
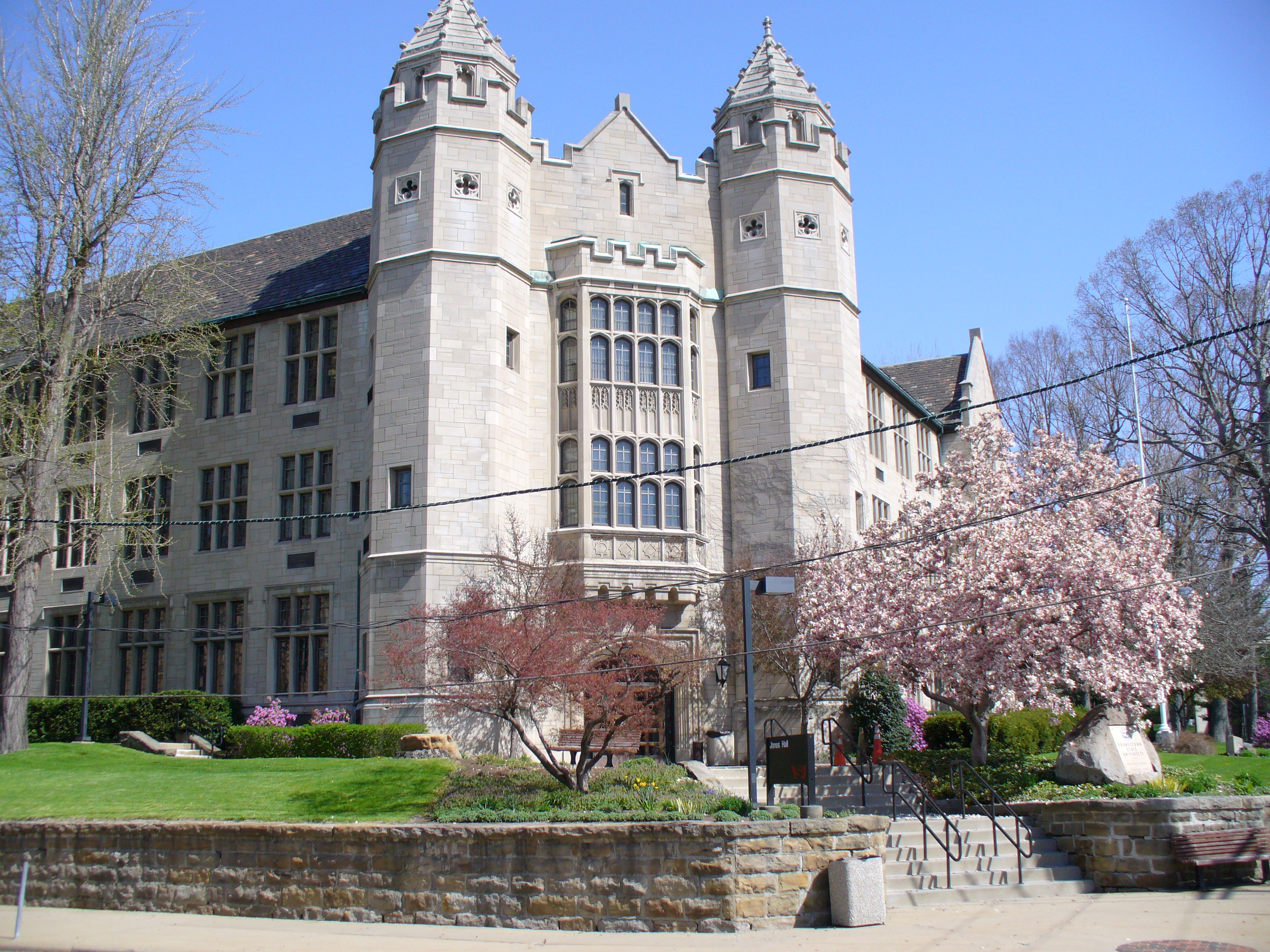
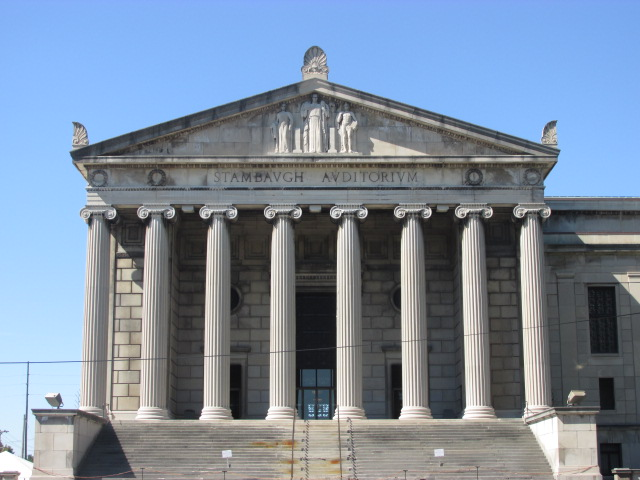
- Downtown Youngstown Metropolitan Tower Mill Creek Park Youngstown State University Stambaugh Auditorium

- Seal Wordmark
- Nickname(s): Steel Town; The YO; Little Chicago; Y-Town
- Interactive map of Youngstown, Ohio
- Location within Ohio Location within the United States
- Coordinates: 41.099095°N 80.645902°W
- Country: United States
- State: Ohio
- Counties: Mahoning, Trumbull
- Founded: 1797
- Incorporated (village): 1848
- Incorporated (city): 1867
- Founder: John Young

Government
  - Type: Mayor–council
  - Mayor: Derrick McDowell
  - President: Anita Davis

Area
  - City: 34.564 sq mi (89.520 km^{2})
  - Land: 33.929 sq mi (87.875 km^{2})
  - Water: 0.635 sq mi (1.645 km^{2}) 1.84%
- Elevation: 856 ft (261 m)

Population (2020)
  - City: 60,068
  - Estimate (2025): 58,832
  - Rank: US: 685th OH: 11th
  - Density: 1,770.4/sq mi (683.56/km^{2})
  - Urban: 320,901 (US: 127th)
  - Urban density: 1,638/sq mi (632.3/km^{2})
  - Metro: 426,086 (US: 131st)
  - Combined: 525,909 (US: 88th)
- Demonym: Youngstownian
- Time zone: UTC–5 (Eastern (EST))
  - Summer (DST): UTC–4 (EDT)
- ZIP Codes: 44501–44507, 44509–44515, 44555
- Area codes: 330 and 234
- FIPS code: 39-88000
- GNIS feature ID: 1086573
- Website: youngstownohio.gov

Youngstown is a city in the U.S. state of Ohio. It lies along the Mahoning River in Northeast Ohio, predominantly within Mahoning County, of which it is the county seat. (Note: Roughly 0.5 square miles (1.3 km^{2}) of the city limits is within Trumbull County and has no residents.) The population was 60,068 at the 2020 census (estimated at 58,832 in 2025), making Youngstown the eleventh-most populous city in Ohio. Its metropolitan area, known as the Mahoning Valley, had an estimated 426,086 residents in 2024.

Youngstown was named after pioneer John Young, who founded the city in 1797 within the Connecticut Western Reserve and established the first sawmill and gristmill along the Mahoning River. It was an early industrial city of the late 19th and early 20th centuries and became known as a center of steel production. However, Youngstown did not economically diversify like larger industrial cities, and with the movement of steelmaking jobs offshore as the industry contracted in the 1970s, the city came to exemplify the Rust Belt.

Revitalization efforts in the 21st century include the Covelli Centre and Youngstown Foundation Amphitheatre, while other notable city institutions include the Butler Institute of American Art, Mill Creek Park, Stambaugh Auditorium, and Youngstown State University. Youngstown is about 5 miles (8.0 km) west of the Ohio–Pennsylvania border and midway between Cleveland (60 miles (97 km) northwest) and Pittsburgh (60 miles (97 km) southeast).

== History ==
=== Founding ===
Youngstown was named for New York native John Young, who surveyed the area in 1796 and settled there soon afterward. On February 9, 1797, Young purchased the township of 15,560 acres (6,300 ha) from the Western Reserve Land Company for $16,085. The 1797 establishment of Youngstown was officially recorded on August 19, 1802.

The area that includes present-day Youngstown was part of the Connecticut Western Reserve, a section of the Northwest Territory that Connecticut initially did not cede to the federal government. Upon cession, Connecticut retained the title to the land in the Western Reserve, which it sold to the Connecticut Land Company for $1,200,000. While many of the area's early settlers came from Connecticut, Youngstown attracted many Scots-Irish settlers from neighboring Pennsylvania. The first European Americans to settle permanently in the area were Pittsburgh native James Hillman and wife Catherine Dougherty. By 1798, Youngstown was the home of several families who were concentrated near where Mill Creek meets the Mahoning River. Boardman Township was founded in 1798 by Elijah Boardman, a member of the Connecticut Land Company. Also founded in 1798 was Austintown by John McCollum who was a settler from New Jersey.

As the Western Reserve's population grew, the need for administrative districts became apparent. In 1800, territorial governor Arthur St. Clair established Trumbull County (named in honor of Connecticut Governor Jonathan Trumbull), and designated the smaller settlement of Warren as its administrative center, or county seat. In 1813, Trumbull County was divided into townships, with Youngstown Township comprising much of what became Mahoning County. The village of Youngstown was incorporated in 1848, and in 1867 Youngstown was chartered as a city. It became the county seat in 1876, when the administrative center of Mahoning County was moved from neighboring Canfield. Youngstown has remained Mahoning County's county seat since then.

=== Growth and industrialization ===
The discovery of coal by the community in the early 19th century paved the way for the Youngstown area's inclusion on the network of the famed Erie Canal. The Pennsylvania and Ohio Canal Company was organized in 1835, and the canal was completed in 1840. Local industrialist David Tod, who became Ohio governor during the Civil War, persuaded Lake Erie steamboat owners that coal mined in the Mahoning Valley could fuel their vessels if canal transportation were available between Youngstown and Cleveland. The railroad's arrival in 1856 smoothed the path for further economic growth.

Youngstown's industrial development changed the face of the Mahoning Valley. The community's burgeoning coal industry drew hundreds of Welsh, German, and Irish immigrants. With the establishment of steel mills in the late 19th century, Youngstown became a popular destination for Eastern European, Italian, and Greek immigrants.

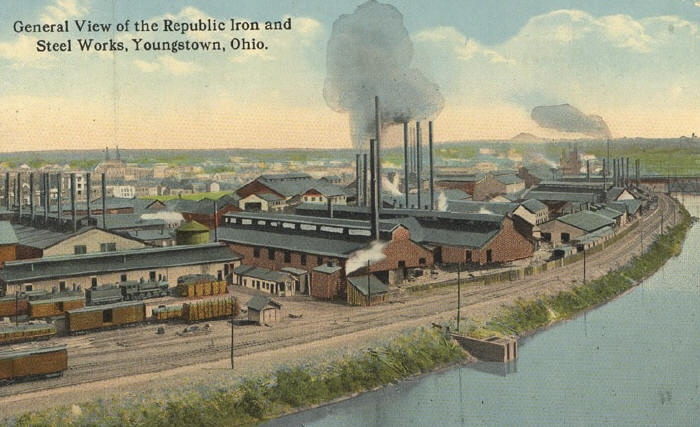
Republic Steel works c. early 1900s

In the early 20th century, the community saw an influx of immigrants from non-European countries including what is modern-day Lebanon, Israel, Palestine, and Syria. By the 1920s, this dramatic demographic shift produced a nativist backlash, and the Mahoning Valley became a center of Ku Klux Klan activity. The situation reached a climax in 1924, when street clashes between Klan members and Italian and Irish Americans in neighboring Niles led Ohio Governor A. Victor Donahey to declare martial law. By 1928, the Klan was in steep decline; and three years later, the organization sold its Canfield, Ohio, meeting area, Kountry Klub Field. Despite the prevalence of Irish Americans in Youngstown, their presence was not always evident. When radio personality Pete Gabriel (who was Greek) came to Youngstown, he found out that there was no St. Patrick's Day parade there at the time, so he started one.

The growth of industry attracted people from within the United States and from Latin America. By the late 19th century, African Americans were well represented in Youngstown, and the first local congregation of the African Methodist Episcopal Church was established in 1871. In the 1880s, local attorney William R. Stewart was the second African American elected to the Ohio House of Representatives. A large influx of African Americans in the early 20th century owed much to developments in the industrial sector. During the national Steel Strike of 1919, local industrialists recruited thousands of workers from the southern United States, many of whom were Black. This move inflamed racist sentiment among local Whites, and for decades, African-American steelworkers experienced discrimination in the workplace. Migration from the South rose dramatically in the 1940s, when the mechanization of southern agriculture brought an end to the sharecropping system, leading onetime farm laborers to seek industrial jobs.

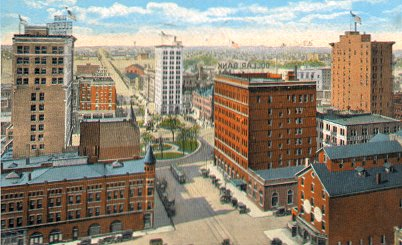
Central Square and Viaduct in the 1910s (view looking south)

Youngstown's local iron ore deposits were exhausted by the early 20th century. Since the city is landlocked (the Mahoning River is not navigable), ore from Michigan and Minnesota had to arrive by rail from Cleveland and other Great Lakes port cities where large bulk carriers were unloaded. This put Youngstown at a competitive disadvantage to the iron and steel producers in Cleveland, Buffalo, Chicago and Detroit—all on Great Lake shores. Compared to these four cities, Youngstown had a higher cost of transporting raw materials to the mills, according to a Harvard Business Review report published in January 1933. Higher transportation costs are one reason why Youngstown mills began their decline slightly earlier than manufacturing in other cities.

The city had a healthy position within the midwestern United States in terms of transportation connections. An airport built in 1930 hosted Capital and United Airlines flights through the region and to New York prior to the jet age of the latter 1950s. It was on the Baltimore and Ohio Railroad mainline to Chicago with the Capital Limited. Likewise, Youngstown was on the Erie Railroad mainline, on its Chicago–Jersey City circuit, with trains such as the Atlantic Express/Pacific Express and the Lake Cities. The city was on the New York Central's Pittsburgh–Buffalo circuit and the Pennsylvania Railroad's Pittsburgh–Cleveland circuit.

=== Post-World War II decline ===
The city's population became more diverse after the end of World War II, when a seemingly robust steel industry attracted thousands of workers. In the 1950s, the Latino population grew significantly and by the 1970s, St. Rose of Lima Catholic Church and the First Spanish Baptist Church of Ohio were among the largest religious institutions for Spanish-speaking residents in the Youngstown metropolitan area. In 1951, city planners projected that Youngstown would grow to 200,000 to 250,000 in population due to continuously strong demand for domestic steel in western Europe, Japan, and South Korea, and so 12,000 acres on the city's East Side were annexed and extended utilities in expectation of future housing projects, in addition to aggressive re-zoning for expanded commercial spaces throughout the city.

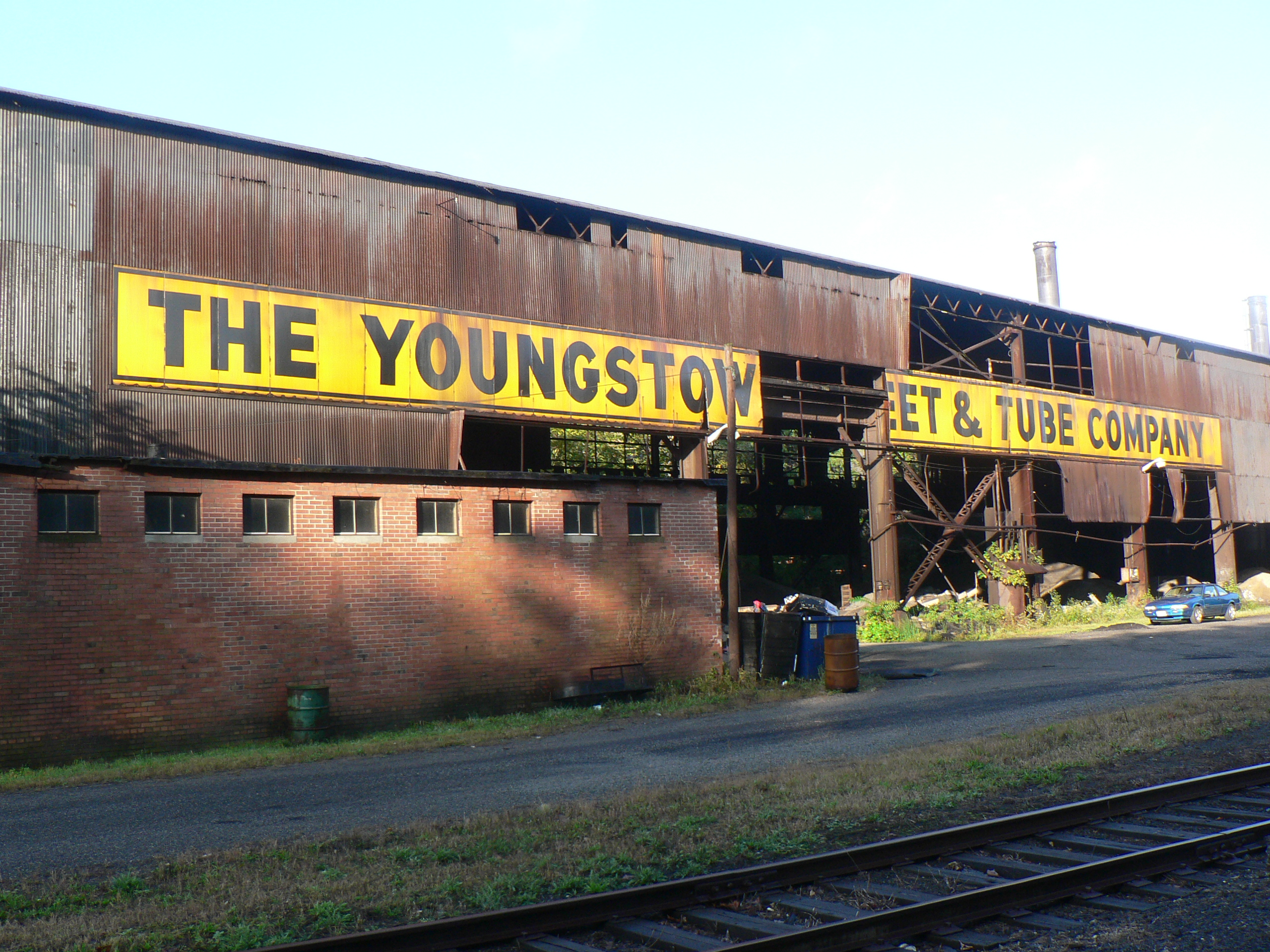
A now-demolished Youngstown Sheet and Tube Company plant in 2006

A strike action occurred on September 6, 1967, when only 9 of the 50 scheduled patrolmen reported for duty at the Youngstown Police Department. Instead, the patrolmen, eventually numbering around 300, along with approximately 300 city-employed firefighters, were attending "continuous professional meetings." They vowed to continue doing so until their demand for an immediate across-the-board pay raise of $1,200 was met. By September 9, when a county judge ordered them back to work, citizens were reportedly disturbed by the risks posed by police and fire services operating at roughly 30% of normal staffing levels. The most serious incident during the walkout was a car fire. When the judge ended the work stoppage, he also ordered the pay raise. Apart from a fruitless six-day "sick call" of police in Detroit in June 1967, Youngstown's action was the first major police strike since the Boston police strike in 1919. The Sheboygan Press of Sheboygan, Wisconsin, observed, "So we have seen the first successful strike by policemen and firemen. It is a precedent over which there should be little rejoicing."

The industrial economy that drew various groups to the area collapsed in the late 1970s, culminating with the September 19, 1977, closure of the Youngstown Sheet and Tube Campbell works after financial downturn due to changes in the steel manufacturing process and international competition. In 1979–1980, U.S. Steel pulled out of the Youngstown area, and in the mid-1980s, Republic Steel also filed for bankruptcy. Attempts to revive the local steel industry proved unsuccessful. Shortly after the closure of most of Youngstown Sheet and Tube's area operations, local religious leaders, steelworkers, and activists such as Staughton Lynd participated in a grassroots effort to purchase and refurbish the company's abandoned plant in neighboring Campbell, Ohio. In response to subsequent challenges, the city has taken well-publicized steps to diversify economically, while building on some traditional strengths.

=== Modern developments ===
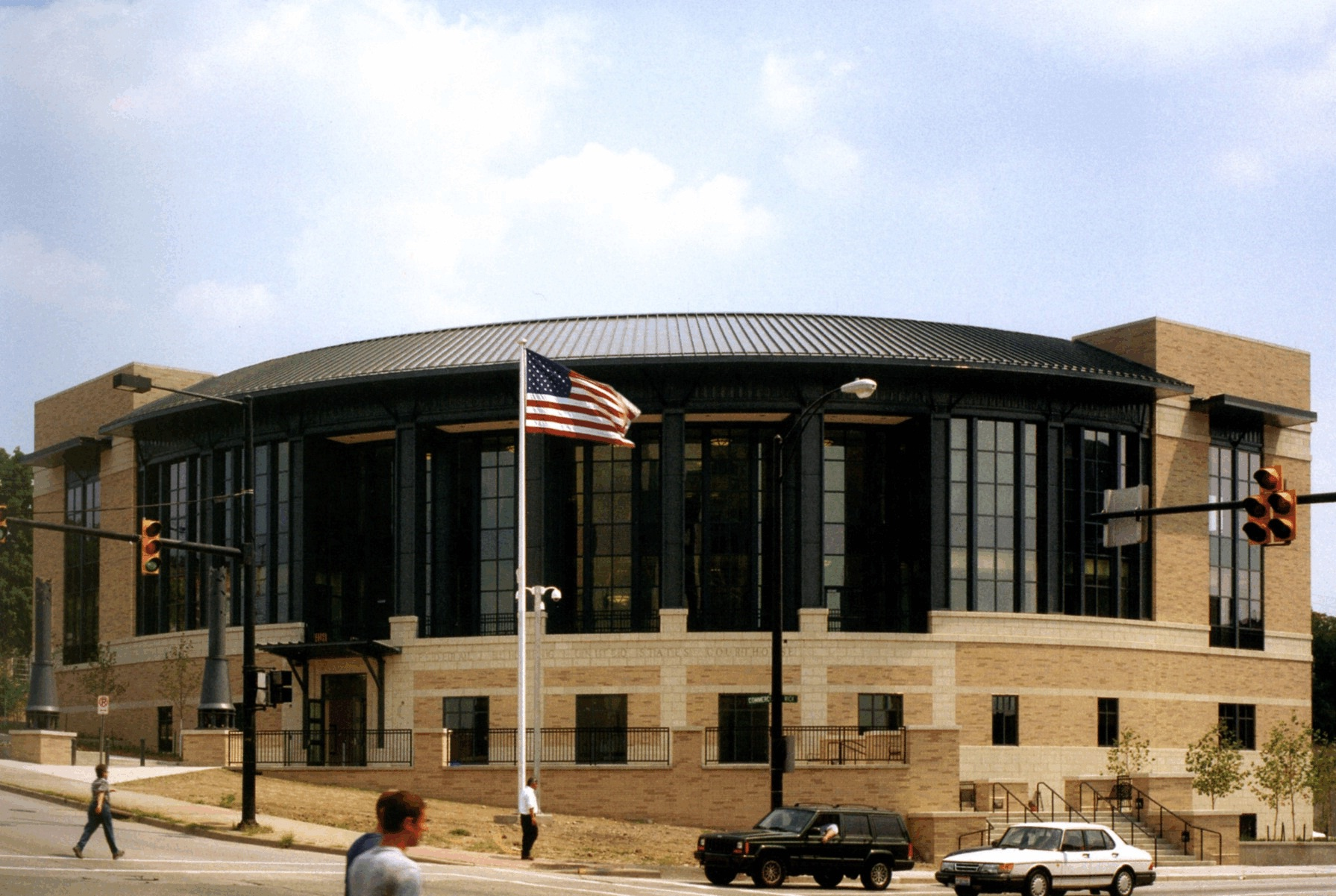
The Nathaniel R. Jones Federal Building and U.S. Courthouse was built during an era of new downtown construction in the early 2000s.

Downtown Youngstown has seen modest levels of new construction. In the 2000s, additions included the Nathaniel R. Jones Federal Building and U.S. Courthouse in 2002, named for native Youngstownian Nathaniel R. Jones and designed by Robert A. M. Stern Architects, the Mahoning County Children's Services Center and George Voinovich Government Center in 2004, and both the Covelli Centre and Ohio Seventh District Court of Appeals in 2006. The Covelli Centre was funded primarily through a $26 million federal grant secured in 2000 by then-Congressman James Traficant and is located on the site of a former steel mill downtown. The arena's main tenants are the Youngstown Phantoms junior hockey team.

In 2004, construction began on a 60-home upscale development called Arlington Heights, and a grant from the United States Department of Housing and Urban Development allowed for the demolition of Westlake Terrace, a sprawling and dilapidated public housing project. Today, the site features a blend of senior housing, rental townhouses and for-sale single-family homes. Low real-estate prices and the efforts of the Youngstown Central Area Improvement Corporation have contributed to the purchase of several long-abandoned downtown buildings (many by outside investors) and their restoration and conversion into specialty shops, restaurants, and eventually condominiums. In addition, a $250 million New Urbanist revitalization of the Smoky Hollow neighborhood developed about 400 new residential units, university student housing, retail space, and a park.

In 2005, Federal Street, a major downtown thoroughfare that was closed off to create a pedestrian-oriented plaza, reopened to traffic. The downtown area has seen the razing of structurally unsound buildings and the expansion or restoration of others. New construction has dovetailed with efforts to cultivate business growth. One of the area's more successful business ventures in recent years has been the Youngstown Business Incubator, which fosters the growth of fledgling technology-based companies.

In line with these efforts to change the community's image, the city government, in partnership with Youngstown State University, organized an ambitious urban renewal plan known as Youngstown 2010. The plan's stated goals included the creation of a "cleaner, greener, and better planned and organized Youngstown". In January 2005, the organization unveiled a master plan prepared by Urban Strategies Inc. of Toronto, which had taken shape during an extensive process of public consultation and meetings that gathered input from citizens. The plan, which included platforms such as the acceptance of a reduced population and an improved image and quality of life for Youngstownians, received national attention and is consistent with efforts in other metropolitan areas to address the phenomenon of urban depopulation. Youngstown 2010 received an award for public outreach from the American Planning Association in 2007.

Youngstown's first new downtown hotel since 1974—the DoubleTree by Hilton—opened in 2018 in the historic Stambaugh Building, adapted for this use. On May 28, 2024, an explosion destroyed most of the first floor of the Realty Building in downtown Youngstown and severely damaged the floors above it, killing one bank employee and injuring seven. The explosion was suspected to have been caused by a natural gas leak.

== Geography ==
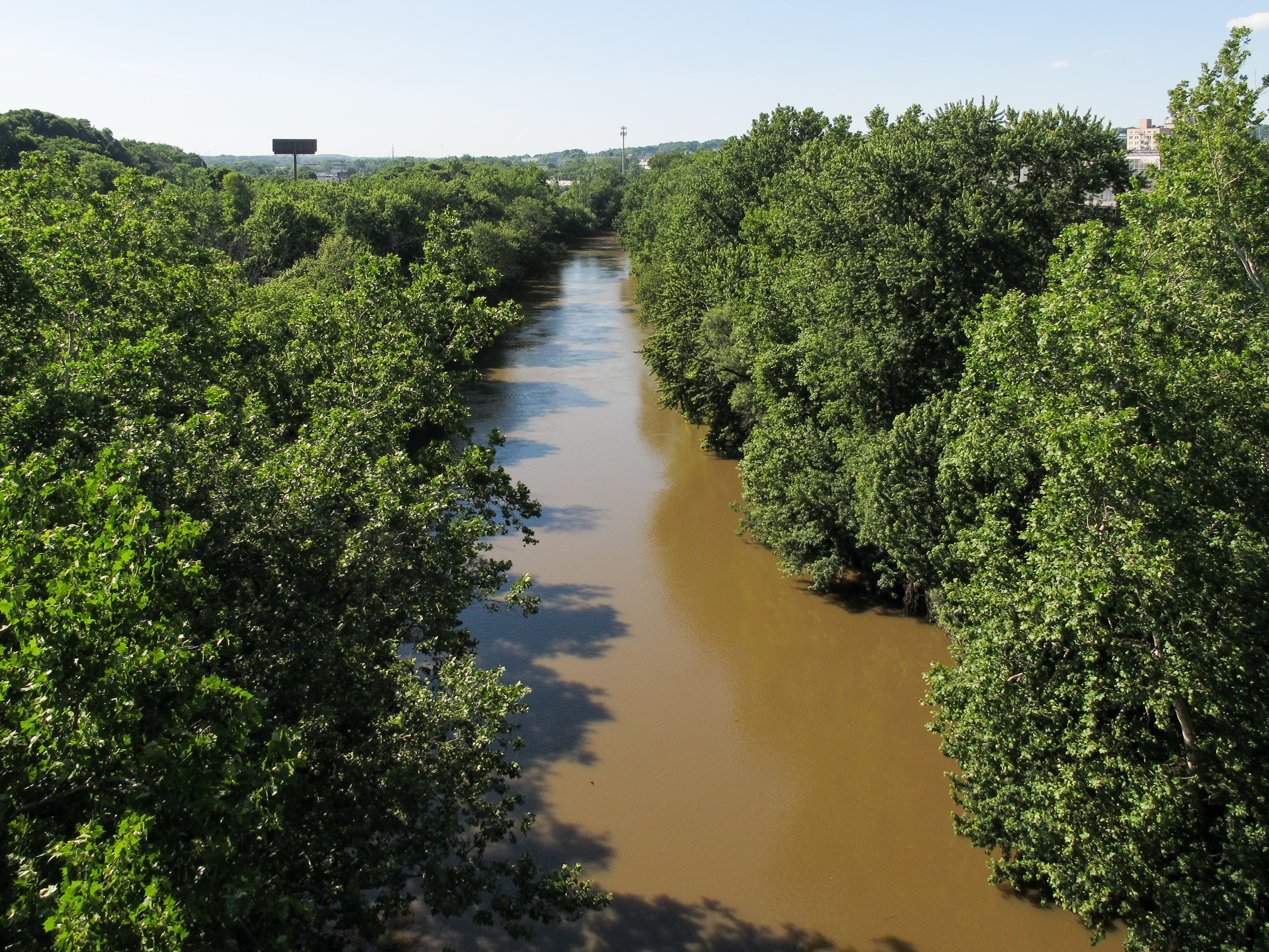
The Mahoning River in Youngstown

According to the United States Census Bureau, the city has a total area of 34.564 square miles (89.52 km^{2}), of which 33.929 square miles (87.88 km^{2}) is land and 0.635 square miles (1.64 km^{2}) (1.84%) is water.

Youngstown is in the geographic Mahoning Valley on the Glaciated Allegheny Plateau. At the end of the last ice age, the glaciers left behind a uniform plain, with valleys such as that caused by the Mahoning River traversing the plain. Lakes created by glaciers that dammed small streams were eventually drained, leaving behind fertile terrain.

=== Climate ===
Youngstown has a humid continental climate (Köppen Dfb/Dfa), typical of the Midwestern United States, with four distinct seasons and lies within USDA hardiness zone 6a. Winters are cold and dry but typically bring a mix of rain, sleet, and snow with occasional heavy snowfall and icing. January is the coldest month with an average mean temperature of 26.8 °F (−2.9 °C), with temperatures on average dropping to or below 0 °F (−18 °C) on 4.1 days and staying at or below freezing on 43 days per year. Snowfall averages 67.8 inches (172 cm) per season, somewhat less than the snowbelt areas closer to Lake Erie. The snowiest month on record was 53.1 inches (135 cm) in December 2010, while winter snowfall amounts have ranged from 118.7 in (301 cm) in 2010–11 to 25.2 in (64 cm) in 1948–49. Springs generally see a transition to fewer weather systems that produce heavier rainfall. Summers are typically very warm and humid with temperatures exceeding 90 °F (32 °C) on 7.7 days per year on average; the annual count has been as high as 40 days in 1943, while the most recent year to not reach that mark is 2014. July is the warmest month with an average mean temperature of 71.5 °F (22 °C).

The all-time record high temperature in Youngstown of 103 °F (39 °C) was established on July 10, 1936, which occurred during the Dust Bowl, and the all-time record low temperature of −22 °F (−30 °C) was set on January 19, 1994. The first and last freezes of the season on average fall on October 14 and May 6, respectively, allowing a growing season of 160 days; however, freezing temperatures have been observed in every month except July. The normal annual mean temperature is 49.9 °F (9.9 °C). Normal yearly precipitation based on the 30-year average from 1991 to 2020 is 41.19 inches (1,046 mm), falling on an average of 168 days per year. Monthly precipitation has ranged from 10.66 in (271 mm) in June 1986 to 0.16 in (4.1 mm) in October 1924, while for annual precipitation the historical range is 54.01 in (1,372 mm) in 2011 to 23.79 in (604 mm) in 1963.

Climate data for Youngstown, Ohio (Youngstown–Warren Regional Airport), 1991–2020 normals, extremes 1897–present
Month	Jan	Feb	Mar	Apr	May	Jun	Jul	Aug	Sep	Oct	Nov	Dec	Year
Record high °F (°C)	71 (22)	75 (24)	82 (28)	90 (32)	95 (35)	99 (37)	103 (39)	100 (38)	99 (37)	88 (31)	80 (27)	76 (24)	103 (39)
Mean maximum °F (°C)	58 (14)	60 (16)	71 (22)	80 (27)	86 (30)	90 (32)	91 (33)	90 (32)	87 (31)	79 (26)	68 (20)	59 (15)	92 (33)
Mean daily maximum °F (°C)	34.3 (1.3)	37.3 (2.9)	46.6 (8.1)	60.3 (15.7)	70.9 (21.6)	78.8 (26.0)	82.7 (28.2)	81.1 (27.3)	74.3 (23.5)	62.1 (16.7)	49.6 (9.8)	38.7 (3.7)	59.7 (15.4)
Daily mean °F (°C)	26.8 (−2.9)	29.0 (−1.7)	37.2 (2.9)	49.1 (9.5)	59.3 (15.2)	67.5 (19.7)	71.5 (21.9)	69.9 (21.1)	63.2 (17.3)	52.2 (11.2)	41.5 (5.3)	32.1 (0.1)	49.9 (9.9)
Mean daily minimum °F (°C)	19.3 (−7.1)	20.7 (−6.3)	27.8 (−2.3)	37.9 (3.3)	47.6 (8.7)	56.2 (13.4)	60.3 (15.7)	58.8 (14.9)	52.1 (11.2)	42.2 (5.7)	33.4 (0.8)	25.5 (−3.6)	40.1 (4.5)
Mean minimum °F (°C)	−1 (−18)	2 (−17)	9 (−13)	23 (−5)	32 (0)	41 (5)	48 (9)	46 (8)	38 (3)	28 (−2)	19 (−7)	8 (−13)	−3 (−19)
Record low °F (°C)	−22 (−30)	−16 (−27)	−10 (−23)	11 (−12)	24 (−4)	30 (−1)	40 (4)	32 (0)	27 (−3)	20 (−7)	1 (−17)	−12 (−24)	−22 (−30)
Average precipitation inches (mm)	3.03 (77)	2.52 (64)	3.21 (82)	3.75 (95)	3.72 (94)	3.90 (99)	4.27 (108)	3.48 (88)	3.84 (98)	3.34 (85)	2.96 (75)	3.17 (81)	41.19 (1,046)
Average snowfall inches (cm)	19.6 (50)	15.1 (38)	10.5 (27)	2.6 (6.6)	0.0 (0.0)	0.0 (0.0)	0.0 (0.0)	0.0 (0.0)	0.0 (0.0)	0.7 (1.8)	4.5 (11)	14.8 (38)	67.8 (172)
Average precipitation days (≥ 0.01 in)	19.4	15.6	15.1	15.0	13.9	12.7	11.3	10.8	10.0	12.7	14.0	17.5	168.0
Average snowy days (≥ 0.1 in)	15.5	11.8	7.9	2.9	0.1	0.0	0.0	0.0	0.0	0.8	4.3	11.3	54.6
Average relative humidity (%)	74.5	73.0	69.8	65.5	67.8	71.1	72.4	75.0	76.6	72.8	74.6	77.5	72.5
Source 1: NOAA
Source 2: World Meteorological Organization (relative humidity 1961–1990)

=== Neighborhoods ===
Downtown Youngstown consists of the original city layout designed by John Young and contains government buildings, banks and entertainment venues, including the Covelli Centre, Powers Auditorium and Youngstown Foundation Amphitheatre. North of downtown is Youngstown State University and the Butler Institute of American Art. The Arlington, Mahoning Commons, Riverbend, Smoky Hollow and University neighborhoods surround downtown. The area is the least populous division of the city, but also its least residential by zoning. It is surrounded by the I-680 and Madison Avenue Expressway highway system.

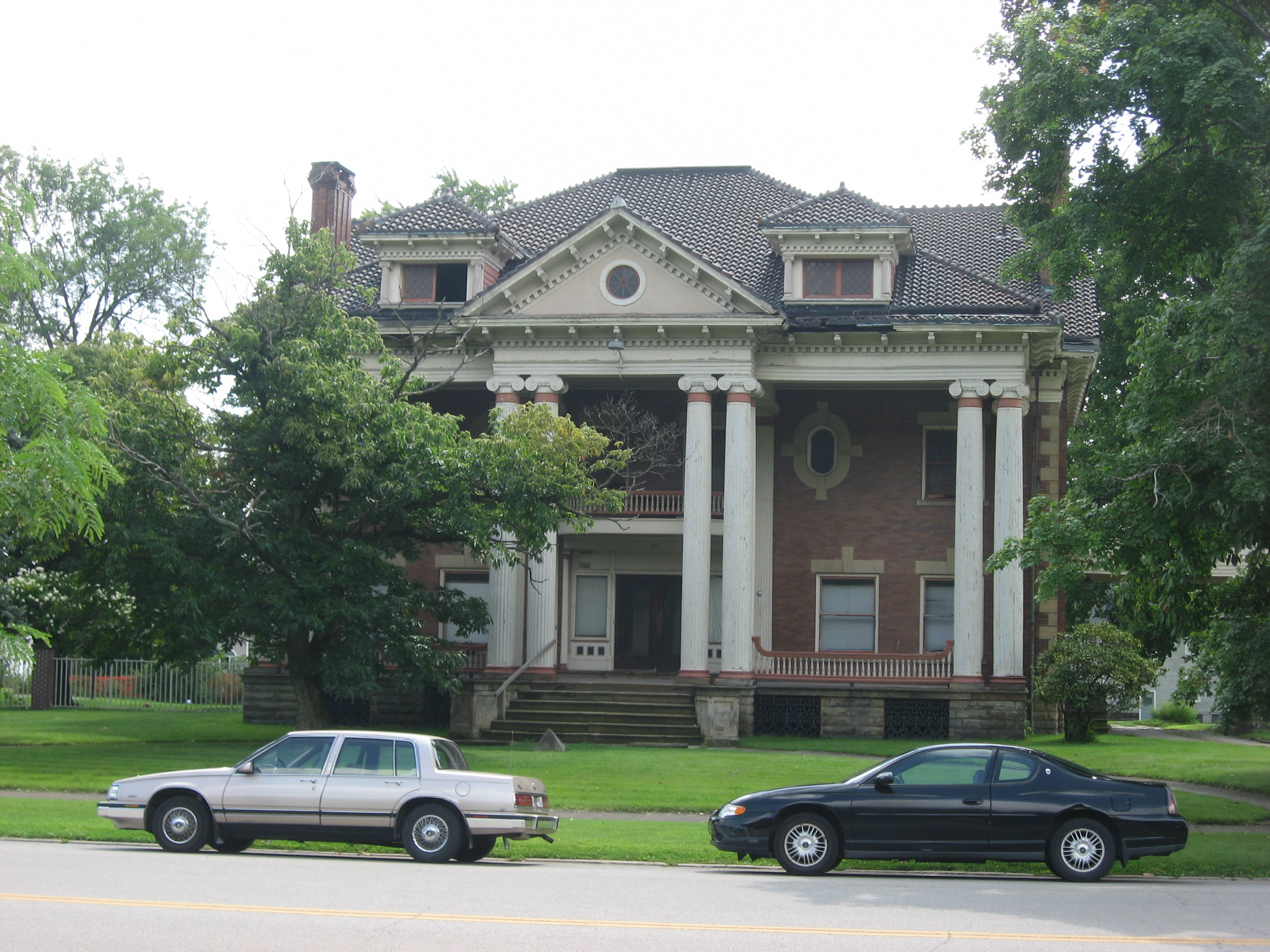
George J. Renner Jr. House, part of the Wick Park Historic District. During the 20th century, Wick Park was home to the city's wealthiest families and mansions.

The North Side consists of the Brier Hill, Crandall Park, North Heights, and Wick Park neighborhoods and the northern section of the Riverbend Industrial Park. Brier Hill was considered one of the city's cultural hotbeds due to many Welsh, Irish, Italian, and African American migrants settling in it, but primarily was once viewed as the city's "Little Italy" as reflected by the Brier Hill-style pizza. Each year, at the end of August, the Brier Hill Fest attracts thousands of visitors from Northeast Ohio and Western Pennsylvania. The historic Crandall Park neighborhood was once home to the city's wealthiest families, and many of the mansions of industrial executives are still including in the Crandall Park-Fifth Avenue Historic District.

Youngstown's South Side is, and historically has been, the city's densest and most populous division, with numerous neighborhoods from each of the city's periods of expansion. The older neighborhoods in this area, namely Oak Hill, Erie, Warren, and Lower Gibson, were among the earliest settled outside of Youngstown during the 19th century and were annexed by the city by 1910. Later neighborhoods such as Fosterville, Newport, Lansingville, Buckeye Plat, and Cottage Grove came into being as industry and population expanded throughout the first half of the 20th century, being annexed in 1929 from the remainder of Youngstown Township. The Pleasant Grove and Brownlee Woods neighborhoods further south were also annexed in 1929 from Boardman Township. The South Side shares Mill Creek Park with the West Side.

The East Side is the largest of the city's regions by area and consists of the East High, East Side, Hazelton, Landsdowne, Lincoln Knolls, Scienceville and Sharon Line/McGuffey Heights communities. The neighborhoods on the East Side closest to downtown Youngstown were among the earliest developed in the city. However, much of the East Side is undeveloped land annexed in the 1950s as part of a zoning effort for future development that never occurred.

The neighborhoods of Belle Vista, Cornersburg, Garden District, Kirkmere, Rocky Ridge, and Schenley on the West Side were built from the 1930s until the 1950s progressing southward, apart from the early Steelton neighborhood and industrial Salt Springs neighborhood. The West Side shares Mill Creek Park with the South Side and lies southwest of the Mahoning River.

== Demographics ==
Historical population
Census	Pop.	Note	%±
1820	273		—
1830	384		40.7%
1840	654		70.3%
1850	2,802		328.4%
1860	2,759		−1.5%
1870	8,075		192.7%
1880	15,435		91.1%
1890	33,220		115.2%
1900	44,885		35.1%
1910	79,066		76.2%
1920	132,358		67.4%
1930	170,002		28.4%
1940	167,720		−1.3%
1950	168,330		0.4%
1960	166,689		−1.0%
1970	139,788		−16.1%
1980	115,427		−17.4%
1990	95,787		−17.0%
2000	82,026		−14.4%
2010	66,982		−18.3%
2020	60,068		−10.3%
2025 (est.)	58,832		−2.1%
U.S. Decennial Census; 2020 Census

The population of Youngstown has declined nearly 65 percent since 1960. According to the real estate website Zillow, the average home price in the city as of November 2025 was $66,086.

=== Racial and ethnic composition ===
Youngstown, Ohio – racial and ethnic composition Note: the US Census treats Hispanic/Latino as an ethnic category. This table excludes Latinos from the racial categories and assigns them to a separate category. Hispanics/Latinos may be of any race.
Race / ethnicity (NH = non-Hispanic)	Pop. 1990	Pop. 2000	Pop. 2010	Pop. 2020	% 1990	% 2000	% 2010	% 2020
White alone (NH)	55,250	40,100	28,918	24,308	57.68%	48.89%	43.17%	40.47%
Black or African American alone (NH)	36,067	35,440	29,448	25,326	37.65%	43.21%	43.96%	42.16%
Native American or Alaska Native alone (NH)	204	195	183	149	0.21%	0.24%	0.27%	0.25%
Asian alone (NH)	281	260	283	257	0.29%	0.32%	0.42%	0.43%
Pacific Islander alone (NH)	—	22	7	24	—	0.03%	0.01%	0.04%
Other race alone (NH)	110	150	128	317	0.11%	0.18%	0.19%	0.53%
Mixed race or multiracial (NH)	—	1,577	1,808	2,792	—	1.92%	2.70%	4.65%
Hispanic or Latino (any race)	3,820	4,282	6,207	6,895	3.99%	5.22%	9.27%	11.48%
Total	95,787	82,026	66,982	60,068	100.00%	100.00%	100.00%	100.00%

=== 2020 census ===
As of the 2020 census, there were 60,068 people, 24,852 households, and 13,072 families residing in the city. The population density was 1,770.40 inhabitants per square mile (683.6/km^{2}). There were 28,675 housing units at an average density of 845.15 per square mile (326.3/km^{2}). The median household income was $30,129.

The median age was 38.5 years. 22.0% of residents were under the age of 18, and 17.7% of residents were 65 years of age or older. For every 100 females, there were 97.8 males, and for every 100 females age 18 and over, there were 96.0 males age 18 and over.

99.3% of residents lived in urban areas, while 0.7% lived in rural areas.

There were 24,852 households in Youngstown, of which 25.4% had children under the age of 18 living in them. Of all households, 22.0% were married-couple households, 26.9% were households with a male householder and no spouse or partner present, and 43.4% were households with a female householder and no spouse or partner present. About 41.4% of all households were made up of individuals, and 17.0% had someone living alone who was 65 years of age or older.

There were 28,675 housing units, of which 13.3% were vacant. The homeowner vacancy rate was 1.8%, and the rental vacancy rate was 10.7%.

Racial composition as of the 2020 census
Race	Number	Percent
White	25,827	43.0%
Black or African American	26,072	43.4%
American Indian and Alaska Native	258	0.4%
Asian	266	0.4%
Native Hawaiian and Other Pacific Islander	28	0.0%
Some other race	2,988	5.0%
Two or more races	4,629	7.7%
Hispanic or Latino (of any race)	6,895	11.5%

=== 2010 census ===
As of the 2010 census, there were 66,982 people, 26,839 households, and 15,150 families residing in the city. The population density was 1,972.38 inhabitants per square mile (761.5/km^{2}). There were 33,123 housing units at an average density of 975.35 per square mile (376.6/km^{2}). The racial makeup of the city was 47.04% White, 45.17% African American, 0.35% Native American, 0.44% Asian, 0.03% Pacific Islander, 3.27% from some other races and 3.69% from two or more races. Hispanic or Latino people of any race were 9.27% of the population.

Youngstown's vacant-housing rate in 2010 was twenty times the national average.

The European ancestry included had 10.8% Italian, 10.8% Irish, 10.0% German, and 4.2% English ancestries. Among the Hispanic population, 5.7% were Puerto Rican, 1.9% Mexican, 0.1% Cuban, and 0.7% some other Hispanic or Latino.

Records suggest that 28.6% of households had children under 18. Of these, 25.6% were married couples living together, 24.8% had a female householder with no husband present, and 43.6% were non-families. Meanwhile, 37.8% of all households comprised a single person, and 14.5% of households comprised a person over 65 years of age living alone. The average household size was 2.28, and the average family size was 3.02.

22.8% of the city's population was under the age of 18, 10.8% was from age 18 to 24, 24.3% was from age 25 to 44, 26.2% was from age 45 to 64, and 15.8% was age 65 or older. The median age was 38 years old. For every 100 females, there were 96.9 males. For every 100 females age 18 and over, there were 95 males.

== Economy ==
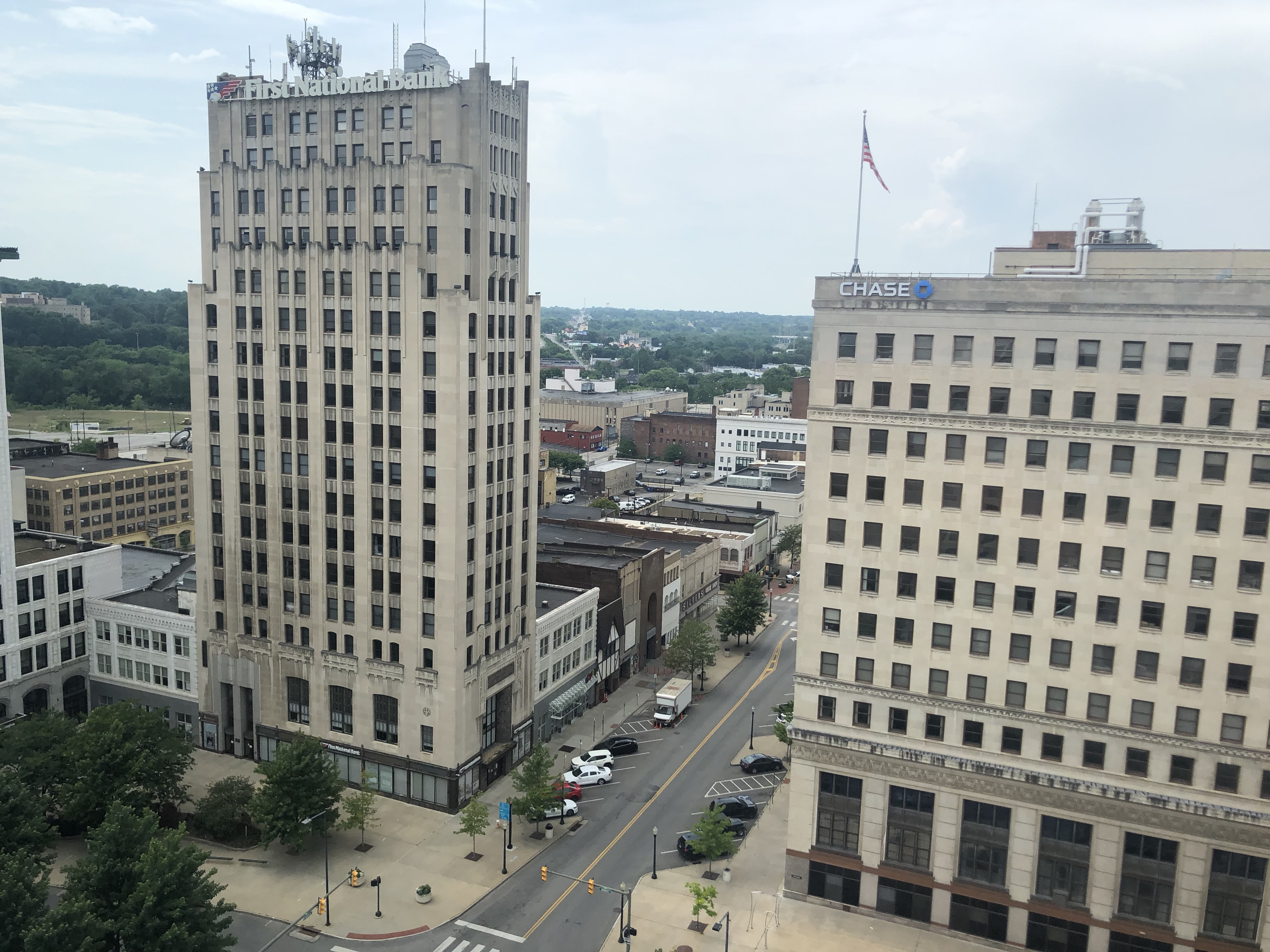
Federal Street in downtown Youngstown, with the Metropolitan Tower on the left

The city's largest employer is Youngstown State University, a public, urban university that serves about 11,000 students, just north of downtown. Youngstown is the site of several steel and metalworking operations, though not to the extent of the past. The largest industrial employers within the city limits are Vallourec Star Steel Company, in the Brier Hill district, and Trivium Packaging. Steelite, a British ceramics manufacturer, has its U.S. headquarters based in Youngstown.

The Youngstown Business Incubator (YBI) houses several start-up technology companies that have received office space, furnishings, and access to utilities. To keep such companies downtown, the YBI secured approval to demolish a row of nearby vacant buildings to clear space for expansion. The YBI had been ranked among the most successful business incubators in the world in the 2010s by the Sweden-based University Business Incubator Index. One of its most successful companies was Turning Technologies, which was named the fastest-growing privately held software company in the United States in 2007.

A number of products and enterprises introduced in Youngstown became national household names. Among them is Schwebel's Bakery, which was established in neighboring Campbell in the 20th century and held its nationwide production in Youngstown's South Side. In the 1920s, Youngstown was the birthplace of the Good Humor brand of ice cream novelties, and the popular franchise of Handel's Homemade Ice Cream & Yogurt was established there in the 1940s. In the 1950s, Youngstown-born developer Edward J. DeBartolo Sr. established one of the country's first modern shopping plazas in the suburban Boardman. The fast-food chain, Arby's, opened the first of its restaurants in Boardman in 1964, and Arthur Treacher's was headquartered in Youngstown in the late 1970s. More recently, the city's downtown hosted the corporate headquarters of the now-defunct pharmacy chain store Phar-Mor, which was established by Youngstown native Michael I. Monus.

McGuffey Plaza, also known as McGuffey Mall, was an indoor shopping center on Youngstown's East Side. The center had become vacant by 2007 and was demolished in 2014.

=== Steel and automotive industries ===
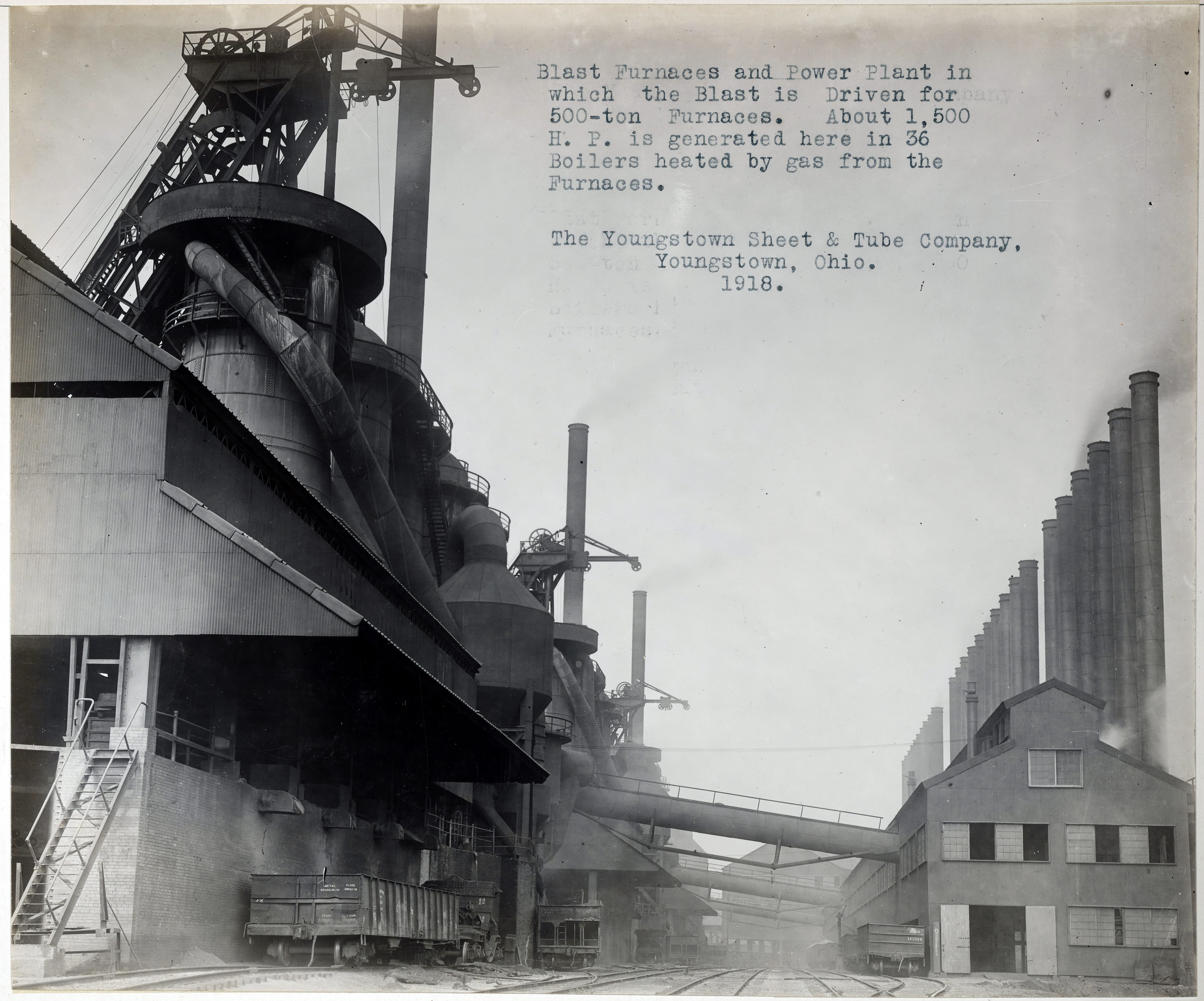
Youngstown Sheet and Tube works in 1918

Endowed with large deposits of coal and iron as well as "old growth" hardwood forests needed to produce charcoal, the Youngstown area developed a thriving steel industry, starting with the area's blast furnace in 1803 by James and Daniel Heaton. By the mid-19th century, Youngstown was the site of several iron industrial plants, and because of easy rail connections to adjacent states, the iron industry continued to expand in the 1890s despite the depletion of local natural resources. At the turn of the 20th century, local industrialists began to convert to steel manufacturing, amid a wave of industrial consolidations that placed much of the Mahoning Valley's industry in the hands of national corporations.

In the late 1930s, the community's steel sector again gained national attention when Youngstown became a site of the so-called "Little Steel Strike", an effort by the Steel Workers Organizing Committee, a precursor to United Steelworkers, to secure contract agreements with smaller steel companies. On June 21, 1937, strike-related violence in Youngstown resulted in two deaths and 42 injuries. Despite the violence, historian William Lawson observed that the strike transformed industrial unions from "basically local and ineffective organizations into all-encompassing, nationwide collective bargaining representatives of American workers".

Between the 1920s and 1960s, the city was known as an important industrial hub that featured the massive furnaces and foundries of such companies as Republic Steel and U.S. Steel. At the same time, Youngstown never became economically diversified, as did larger industrial cities such as Chicago, Pittsburgh, Akron, or Cleveland. Hence, when economic changes forced the closure of plants throughout the 1970s, the city was left with few substantial economic alternatives. The September 19, 1977, announcement of the closure of a large portion of Youngstown Sheet and Tube, an event still referred to as "Black Monday", is widely regarded as the death knell of the old area steel industry in Youngstown. In the wake of the steel plant shutdowns, the community lost an estimated 40,000 manufacturing jobs, 400 satellite businesses, $414 million in personal income, and from 33 to 75 percent of the school tax revenues. The Youngstown area has yet to fully recover from the loss of jobs in the steel sector.

The blow dealt to the community's industrial economy in the 1970s was slightly mitigated by automotive production in the metropolitan area. A mainstay of Youngstown's industrial economy had long been the General Motors Lordstown Assembly, which was the area's largest industrial employer in the decades following the decline of the steel industry. Once one of the nation's largest auto plants in terms of square feet, the Lordstown facility was home to production of the Chevrolet Impala, Chevrolet Vega, and Chevrolet Cavalier. The Lordstown Assembly was shuttered in March 2019 and is currently owned by Foxconn. In the late 1980s, the Avanti, an automobile with a fiberglass body originally designed by Studebaker to compete with the Chevrolet Corvette, was manufactured by the Avanti Motor Corporation in an industrial complex on Youngstown's Albert Street. Production was moved to Youngstown by John J. Cafaro; production ended in 1991.

== Arts and culture ==
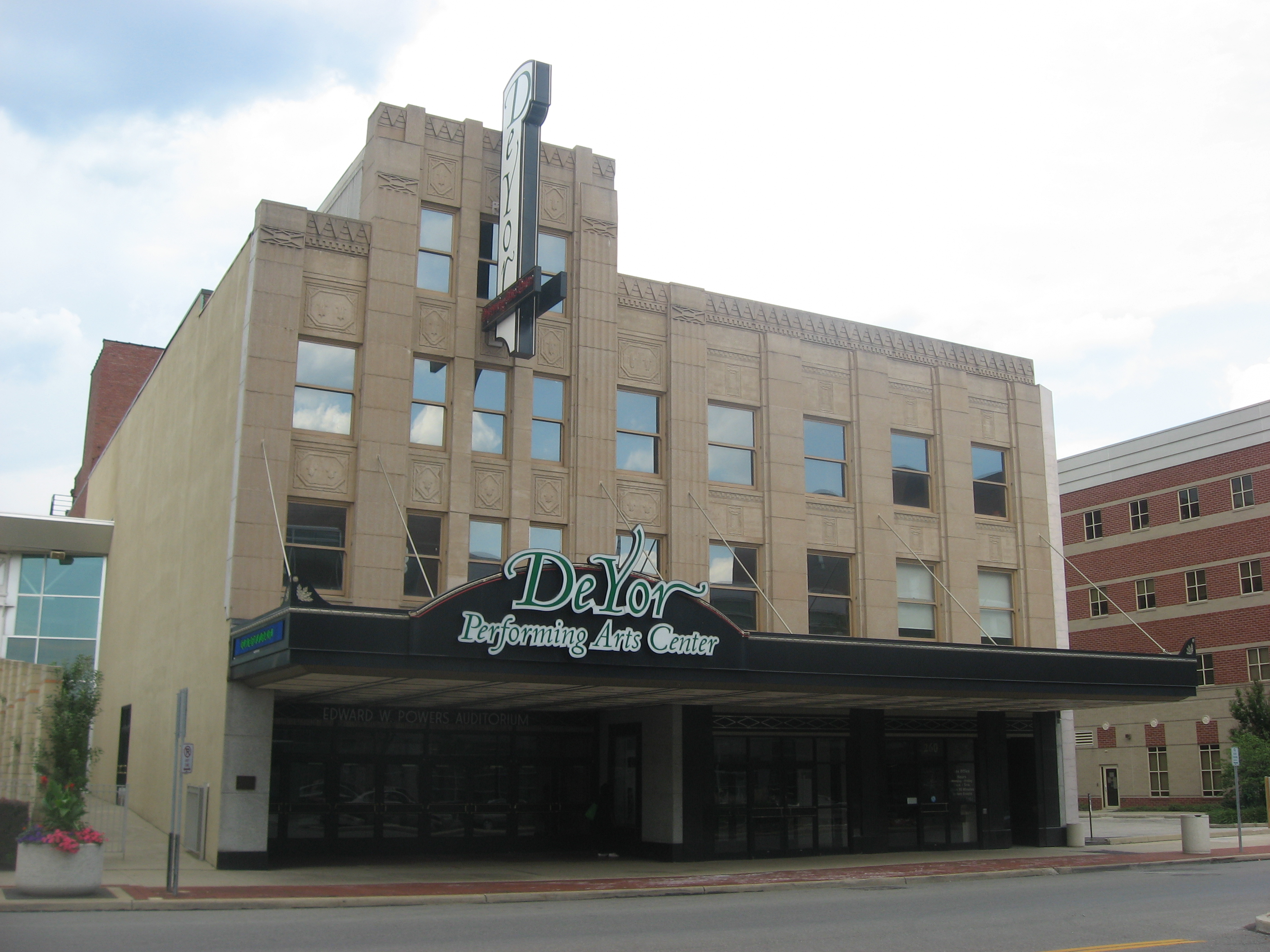
Powers Auditorium at DeYor Performing Arts Center

Despite the impact of regional economic decline, Youngstown offers an array of cultural resources. The Youngstown Symphony Orchestra has been based in the city since 1926. It performs at Powers Auditorium, a former Warner Bros. movie palace that serves as the area's primary music hall. This downtown landmark is one of five auditoriums within the city. Ford Recital Hall was built in 2006 as an addition to Powers Auditorium.

Stambaugh Auditorium, located on the city's north side, is an imposing neo-classical structure that has served for decades as a site for concerts and private events. The facility also hosts the Stambaugh Youth Concert Band. Bruce Springsteen, who sang about the decline of Youngstown's steel industry and its adverse effects on local workers in his ballad "Youngstown", played at Stambaugh Auditorium on January 12, 1996, as part of his solo Ghost of Tom Joad Tour.

Youngstown's newest venue is the Youngstown Foundation Amphitheatre, an outdoor venue opened in 2019 upon former industrial grounds downtown that hosts various musicians. Artists also perform at the Covelli Centre arena downtown. Historically, one of the area's most popular attractions was Idora Park in the Idora neighborhood on Youngstown's south side. An urban amusement park, it operated from 1899 until it was closed after a large fire destroyed many of its premier rides in 1984.

=== Theater ===
The Youngstown Playhouse, Mahoning County's primary community theater, has served the area for more than 100 years, established in 1924, despite intermittent financial problems. Believed by some observers to be the nation's oldest continuously operating community theater, the Youngstown Playhouse was the only community theater in Ohio to ever receive major institutional support from the Ohio Arts Council. The Oakland Center for the Arts, formerly in the downtown area, was a well-known venue for locally produced plays before it closed in 2015 due to poor management. In late 2016. the Oakland Center for the Arts was re-established with a new focus on youth and kids theatre.

Several community theaters have risen in the area such as The Rustbelt Theater Company, The Hopewell (formally Victorian Players), and Millennial Theatre Company who are known for their regional premieres and larger theatrical experiences.

Well known theatrical personalities from the Youngstown area include comedic actor Joe Flynn, screen actress Elizabeth Hartman, singer and Broadway performer Maureen McGovern, and television and screen actor Ed O'Neill.

=== Museums ===
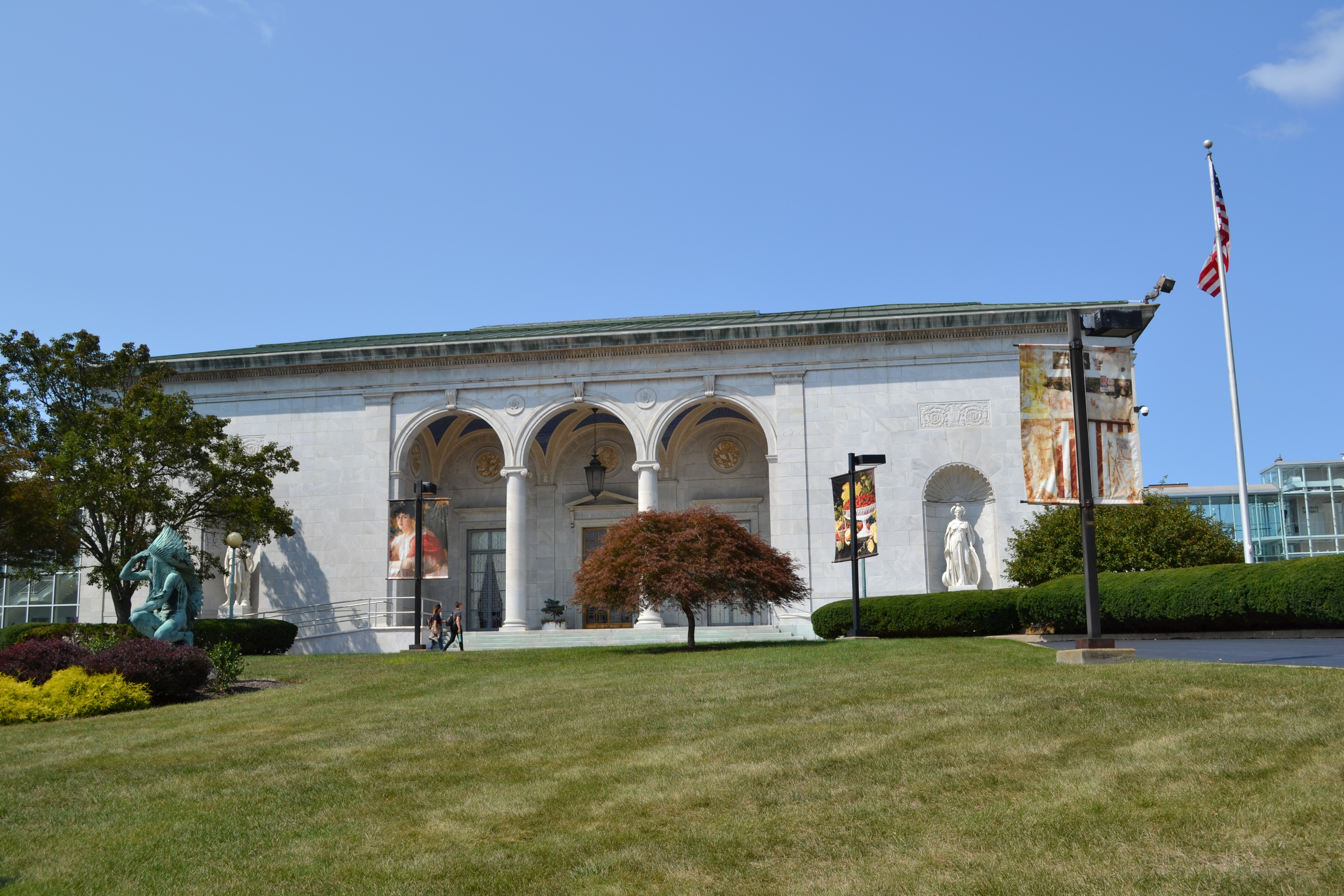
The Butler Institute of American Art was the first museum in the country dedicated to American art.

The Butler Institute of American Art is on the northeastern edge of the Youngstown State University campus. Established by industrialist Joseph G. Butler Jr., in 1919, it was the first museum in the country dedicated to American art. Across the street from the Butler Institute stands the McDonough Museum of Art, YSU's University Art Museum and the Mahoning Valley's center for contemporary art. The McDonough, established in 1991, features changing exhibitions by regional, national and international artists and provides public access to the work of students, faculty and alumni from the Department of Art. The Clarence R. Smith Mineral Museum, also on the YSU campus, is operated by the university's geology department and housed in a campus building.

To the immediate north of YSU is the Arms Family Museum of Local History. The museum, housed in a 1905 mansion on the main artery of Wick Avenue, is managed by the Mahoning Valley Historical Society. Once the estate of a local industrialist, it maintains period rooms that showcase the household's original contents, including furnishings, art objects, and personal artifacts. The museum mounts rotating exhibits on topics related to local history.

The Youngstown Historical Center of Industry and Labor sits south of the YSU campus. This museum, owned and operated by the Ohio Historical Society, focuses on the Mahoning Valley's history of steel production. Other museums include the Children's Museum of the Valley, an interactive educational center in the downtown area, and the Davis Education and Recreation Center, a small museum that showcases the history of Youngstown's Mill Creek Park.

On the city's north side the Youngstown Steel Heritage Foundation is constructing the Tod Engine Heritage Park, featuring a collection of steel industry equipment and artifacts. The main exhibit is a 1914 William Tod Co. rolling mill steam engine that was built in Youngstown and used at the Youngstown Sheet and Tube Brier Hill Works. The Tod Engine is one of three remaining rolling mill engines in the United States and is a Mechanical and Materials Engineering Landmark.

== Parks and recreation ==
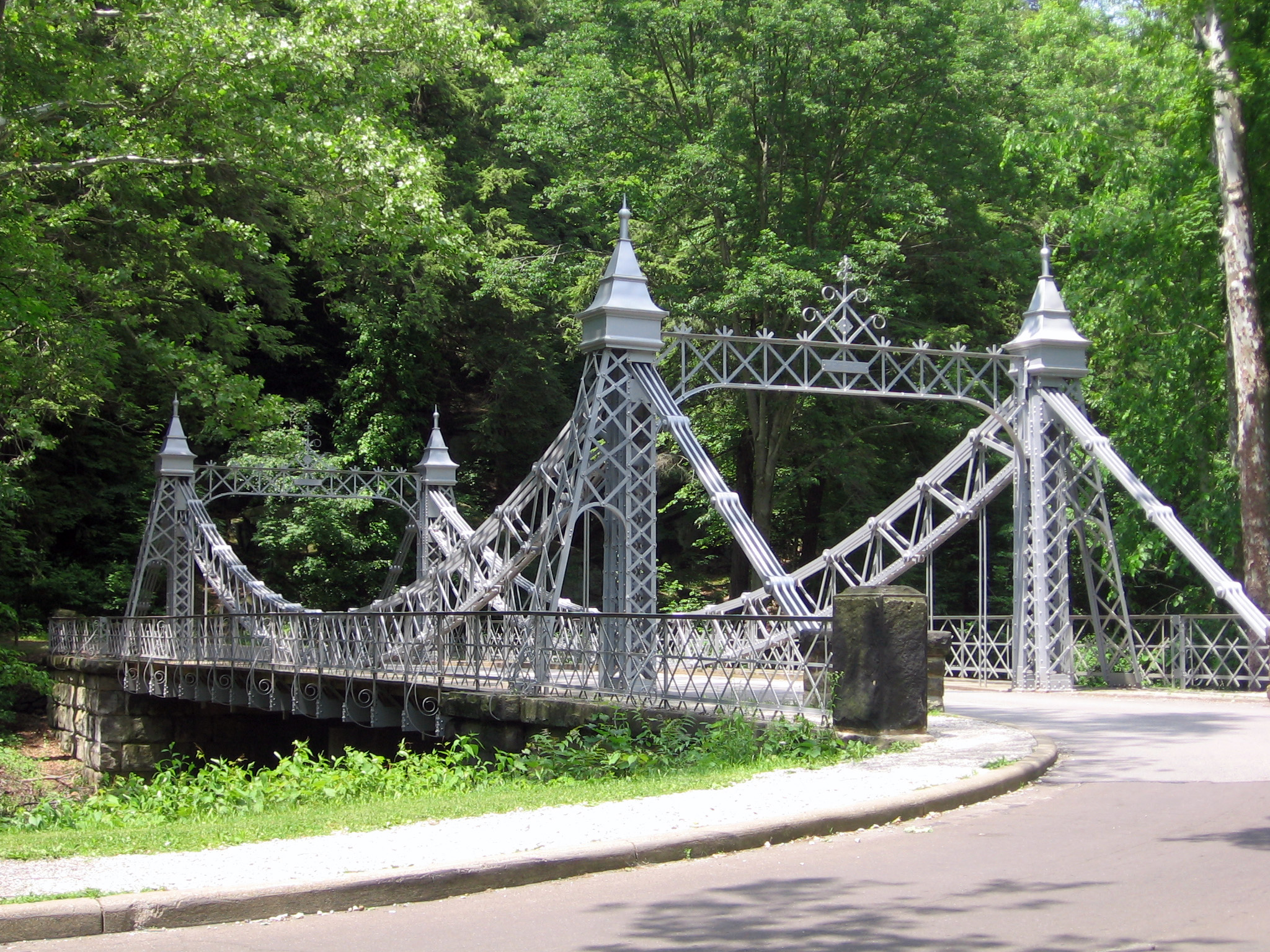
Mill Creek Park "Cinderella" suspension bridge

Youngstown's most popular resource is Mill Creek Park, a five-mile (8 km)-long stretch of woodland along the eponymous Mill Creek. Mill Creek Park is the oldest park district in Ohio, established as a township park in 1891. The park's highlights include the restored 19th century Lanterman's Mill, the rock formations of Bear's Den, scores of nature trails, the Fellows Riverside Gardens and Education Center, the "Cinderella" suspension bridge, and two 18-hole Donald Ross golf courses. Mill Creek Park encompasses approximately 2,600 acres (1,100 ha), 20 miles (32 km) of drives and 15 miles (24 km) of foot trails. Its attractions include gardens, streams, lakes, woodlands, meadows, and wildlife.

Fellows Riverside Gardens' lookout point offers visitors contrasting views of the area. From the south side, the canopied woodlands overlooking Lake Glacier are visible; from the north side, visitors are presented with a view of downtown Youngstown. The park features two 18-hole golf courses. The North Course is on rolling terrain, while the South Course features narrow, tree-lined fairways. Other features include playgrounds, athletic fields, and picnic areas.

In 2005, Mill Creek Park was placed on the National Register of Historic Places. A plaque commemorating this event is near a memorial statue of Volney Rogers, the Youngstown attorney who set aside land for the creation of Mill Creek Park.

A smaller recreational area called Wick Park is on the city's north side. Wick Park's periphery is lined with early 20th-century mansions built by the city's industrialists, business leaders, and professionals during Youngstown's boom years. Stambaugh Auditorium, a popular venue for concerts and other public events, is near the park's southwestern edge. Another small recreational area called Crandall Park is also on the north side. Crandall Park is surrounded by landscaped homes, tree-lined streets, and walkable access to shopping and recreation. Several cemeteries (notably historic Oak Hill Cemetery) and small recreational spaces are scattered throughout the city, including Homestead Park, John White Park, Lynn Park, Borts Pool and the Northside Pool.

== Sports ==
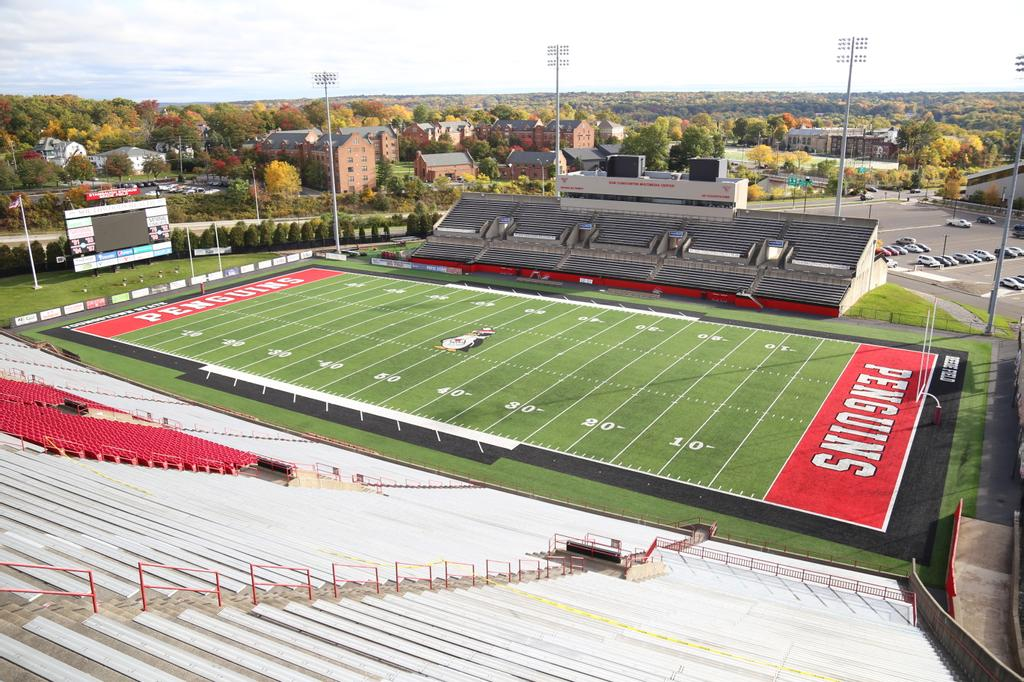
Stambaugh Stadium is located on the campus of Youngstown State University.

Club	League	Venue	Established	Championships
Youngstown Phantoms	USHL, ice hockey	Covelli Centre	2003	2

Youngstown has enjoyed a long tradition of professional and semi-professional sports. The Youngstown Phantoms of the United States Hockey League have played at the Covelli Centre since 2003. The Mahoning Valley Scrappers, an MLB Draft League affiliate, have played at Eastwood Field in Niles since 1999. The Youngstown Nighthawks of the Major Arena Soccer League 3, play in Cortland. Amateur soccer club Mahoning Trumbull United SC has competed in the Northern Ohio Soccer League since 2023. Amateur flat-track roller derby team Youngstown Area Roller Derby was established in 2008 and plays against other teams within the Women's Flat Track Derby Association.

In earlier decades, the city produced scores of minor league baseball teams, including the Youngstown Ohio Works, Youngstown Champs, Youngstown Indians, Youngstown Steelmen, Youngstown Browns, Youngstown Gremlins, and Youngstown Athletics. Local enthusiasm for baseball was such that the community hosted championship games of the National Amateur Baseball Federation throughout the 1930s and 1940s. The area's minor league baseball teams were supplemented by semi-professional football teams, including the Youngstown Patricians, who won the 1915 championship of the informal "Ohio League" (a direct predecessor to the National Football League), and the Youngstown Hardhats, who competed in the Middle Atlantic Football League in the 1970s and early 1980s. For three seasons, Youngstown was home to the Mahoning Valley Thunder of the now-defunct af2, the minor league for the Arena Football League until 2009 when the franchise ceased operations. In 2005, the Ohio Red Bulls semi-pro football team of the United States Football Association won their first championship. Local minor league basketball teams included the Youngstown Pride of the WBA from 1987 to 1992, the Youngstown Hawks of the IBA in 1999, and the Mahoning Valley Wildcats of the IBL in 2005. The Youngstown SteelHounds hockey team played in the Central Hockey League from 2005 until 2008.

Youngstown has produced many prominent athletes with connections to the city, including former world boxing champions Greg Richardson, IBF lightweight champion Harry Arroyo, IBF cruiserweight champion Jeff Lampkin, WBA lightweight champion Ray "Boom Boom" Mancini, WBC and WBO middleweight champion Kelly Pavlik, College Football Hall of Fame end Bob Dove, Hall of Fame umpire Billy Evans, major league pitcher Dave Dravecky, NFL quarterback Bernie Kosar, NFL Running back Lynn Bowden Jr., major league manager Jimmy McAleer, legendary baseball trainer "Bonesetter" Reese, major league outfielder George Shuba, and Heisman Trophy recipient Frank Sinkwich.

=== Youngstown State Penguins ===
The community has a lengthy tradition of collegiate sports. The Youngstown State Penguins football team competes in the Missouri Valley Football Conference. The Penguins, four-time champions in FCS (I-AA) football, play their games at Stambaugh Stadium and enjoy one of the more supportive fan bases. All other YSU athletic teams compete in the Horizon League, which does not sponsor football. The Youngstown State men and women's basketball teams hold their games at Youngstown State's Beeghly Center. The teams average about 2,500 fans per game, a number that rose with a new style of play under former head coach Jerry Slocum. In addition, the YSU baseball and softball teams have enjoyed local support and success. The baseball team reached the NCAA super-regionals in 2005, and the softball team did so in 2006.

== Government and politics ==
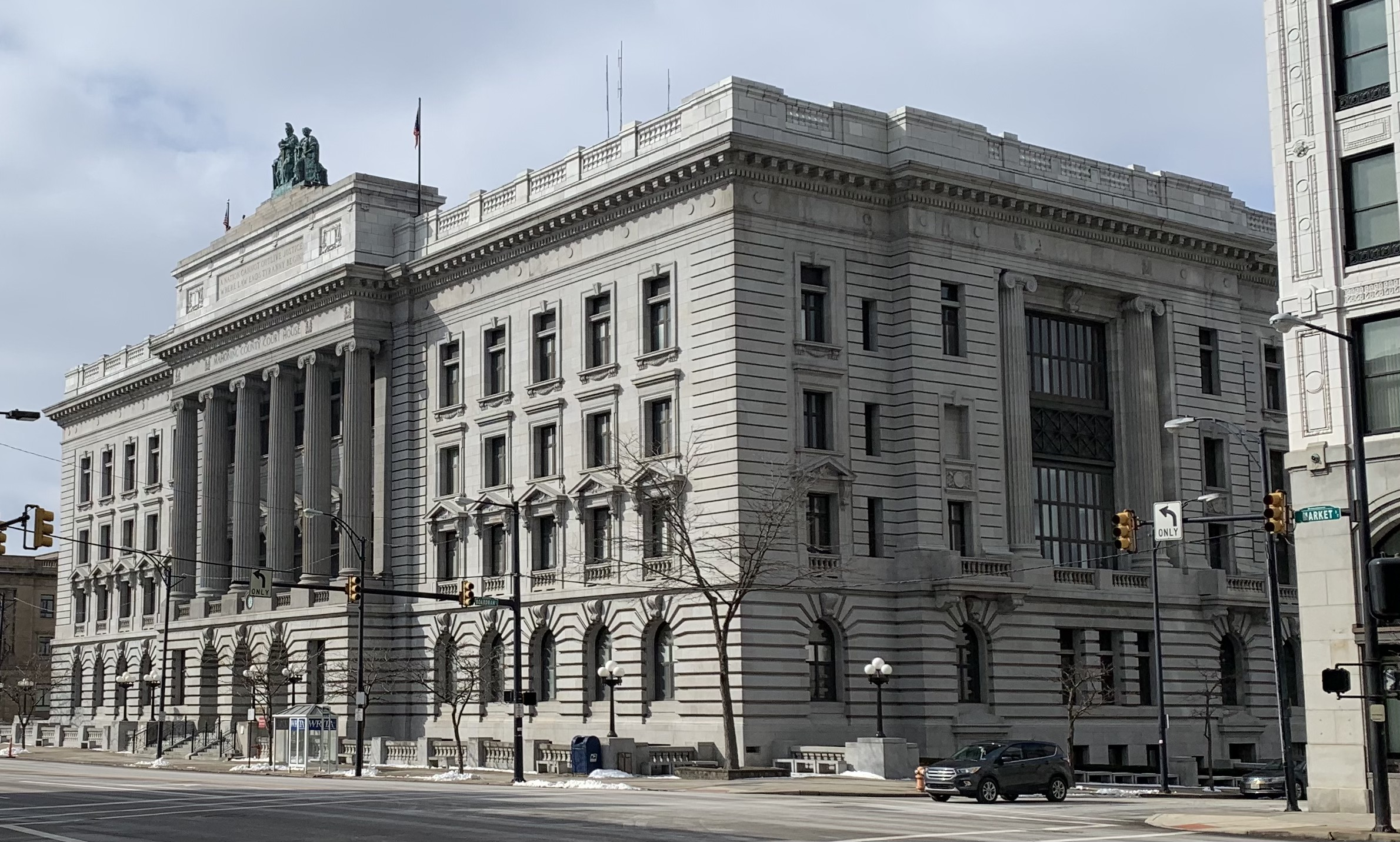
Mahoning County Courthouse

Youngstown is governed by a mayor who is elected every four years. Youngstown's mayor is Derrick McDowell, who was elected in 2025. The city has tended to elect Democratic mayors since the late 1920s because the local unions supported Democratic candidates for office. Residents elect an eight-member city council composed of representatives of the city's seven wards and a council president. The council traditionally meets every first and third Wednesday of the month. Meanwhile, the board of control, chaired by the mayor, oversees contracts for public projects within the municipal limits.

In the Ohio General Assembly, Youngstown is located in the 59th State Representative District, represented by Democrat Lauren McNally, and in the 33rd Senate District, represented by Republican Alessandro Cutrona. Federally, Youngstown has been located in Ohio's 6th congressional district since 2023 after being redistricted. The Ohio Seventh District Court of Appeals is based in the city, as is one of four courthouses of the United States District Court for the Northern District of Ohio.

Like many urban areas in the U.S., Youngstown is a Democratic stronghold, although the remainder of Mahoning County has been trending to the right in recent elections. Youngstown has become a political backdrop for both Democrats and Republicans who go to the area to campaign on economic development and jobs. Circa 1972 to 2016, the majority of voters in Mahoning County and Youngstown chose Democratic Party candidates in U.S. presidential elections. Tex Fischer stated that during the 2012 U.S. presidential election, area residents perceived Mitt Romney as being inauthentic, which contributed to his loss.

However, in the 2020 U.S. presidential election, the majority in Mahoning County selected Donald Trump. Andrew Gumbell of The Observer stated that Trump gained popularity from 2017 to 2020 even though the Youngstown area economy declined in the same period; Trump in 2017 made statements saying that he would revive the area economically. In the 2024 U.S. presidential election, Trump won the county by 13 points. Gumbell cited "disillusioned working-class voters" and their feelings for the rising popularity of Trump in the area; according to Gumbell, the voters perceive all politicians to be corrupt, but Trump to be honest about being a corrupt person. Gumbell added that the voters believe that Trump would abolish a system that disadvantages them, but that the majority of area voters do not believe that, in Gumbell's words, that Trump will "fix everything or believe him when he says he will."

=== Crime ===
Crime has been a lingering problem in many of the Rust Belt's big and small urban communities, hampering economic recovery. In the late 1950s and early 1960s, Youngstown was nationally identified with gangland slayings often committed with car bombs. The town gained the nicknames "Murdertown, USA" and "Bomb City, USA," while the phrase "Youngstown tune-up" became a nationally popular slang term for car-bomb assassination. The image of Youngstown's association with crime was reinforced by the construction of prisons inside the metropolitan area. As of 2012, three adult correctional facilities continue to operate within city limits: the Mahoning County Justice Center the Northeast Ohio Correctional Center, and the Ohio State Penitentiary.

For decades, Youngstown was a haven for organized crime, and related corruption was ingrained into the fabric of its society. A 2000 publication in The New Republic listed a "chief of police, the outgoing prosecutor, the sheriff, the county engineer, members of the local police force, a city law director, several defense attorneys, politicians, judges, and a former assistant U.S. attorney" as controlled by the Mob. The city accelerated measures to limit the influence of organized crime upon all sectors of municipal life. In 2006, Youngstown was ranked by Morgan Quitno Press, a Kansas-based publishing and research company, as the 9th most dangerous city in the United States. After The Saturday Evening Post framed Youngstown as "Crimetown U.S.A.", there was an interest by many to create documentaries or podcasts to get in-depth information about the corruption unfolding in the city. Released in July 2022, Marc Smerling released a podcast titled "Crooked City" to share some of those stories.

== Education ==
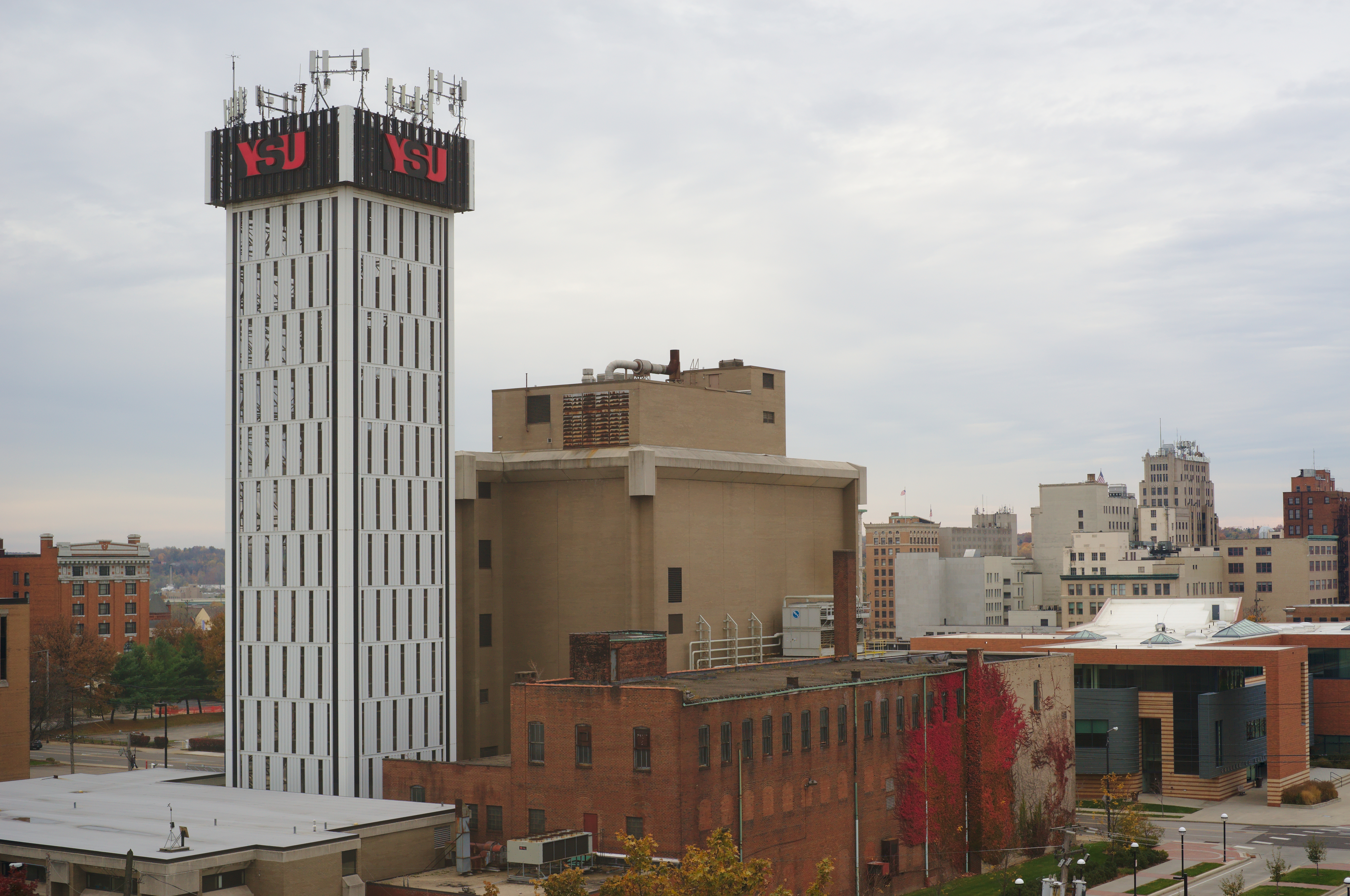
The campus of Youngstown State University is located north of downtown Youngstown.

Youngstown is served by the Public Library of Youngstown and Mahoning County system, with libraries located in the Downtown (Main), Brownlee Woods, East High, Newport, and Schenley (Michael Kusalaba) neighborhoods.

=== Primary and secondary ===
The Youngstown City School District manages public education within the city and covers almost all of the city limits. Since 2015, the state government has overseen the district's operation due to district mismanagement. The district's high school graduation rate has improved since the takeover, from 65% in 2015 to 88% in 2020. YCSD operates five elementary schools, two middle schools, and two high schools, as well as one alternative school and one technical school. The district extensively built new schools throughout the late 2000s, and sold many of its older buildings to local private schools.

At one time, the school district had eight dedicated public high schools (including now-defunct Chaney, East, North, Rayen, South, and Wilson), but mergers since the 1990s have resulted in three secondary schools: Youngstown High School, Choffin Career and Technical Center, and Youngstown Rayen Early College. The early college program, in cooperation with Youngstown State University, enables middle and high school students to attend classes both on campus and at YCSD schools and earn college credit.

The Diocese of Youngstown once oversaw more than 20 schools within the city. As a result of dwindling enrollment, only four Catholic schools now operate within Youngstown proper. These include two primary schools—St. Christine's School and St. Joseph the Provider School—and two secondary schools, Cardinal Mooney High School and Ursuline High School. Several additional Catholic schools operate in the region which accept Youngstown students.

Youngstown hosts a small number of private schools. These include Valley Christian School, a nondenominational K-12 school; Akiva Academy, a progressive K–8 school in the Jewish Community Center; and the Montessori School of the Mahoning Valley, which offers alternative learning environments for students ranging from preschool to eighth grade. There are also various smaller, K-8 charter academies in the city, such as the Stambaugh Charter Academy and South Side Academy.

=== Higher education ===
Youngstown State University, the primary institution of higher learning in the Youngstown metropolitan area, traces its origins to a local YMCA program that began offering college-level courses in 1908. YSU joined the Ohio system of higher education in 1967. The university has an enrollment of about 11,000 undergraduate and graduate students within its seven colleges. The campus is just north of the city's downtown and south of Youngstown's historic Fifth Avenue district, a neighborhood of Tudor-, Victorian-, and Spanish Colonial Revival-style homes.

Eastern Gateway Community College operated a campus in downtown Youngstown from 2009 to 2024.

== Media ==
=== Print ===
The Vindicator is the sole daily newspaper in the city, currently published as a zoned edition of Warren's Tribune Chronicle in broadsheet. It formerly competed with the Warren-based paper, and the Lisbon-based Morning Journal, although they primarily covered their respective counties, with limited coverage of Mahoning County and Youngstown, until in June 2019 it was announced that The Vindicator would cease publication by mid-August of the same year. Although this newspaper carries the name of the old Vindicator, its scope is comparatively limited, with the majority of previous Vindicator journalists not being carried over to the new edition.

Other newspapers that print in Youngstown include bi-monthly The Business Journal, The Metro Monthly, and the weekly The Jambar, published by the students of Youngstown State University on Wednesdays while classes are in session.

=== TV ===
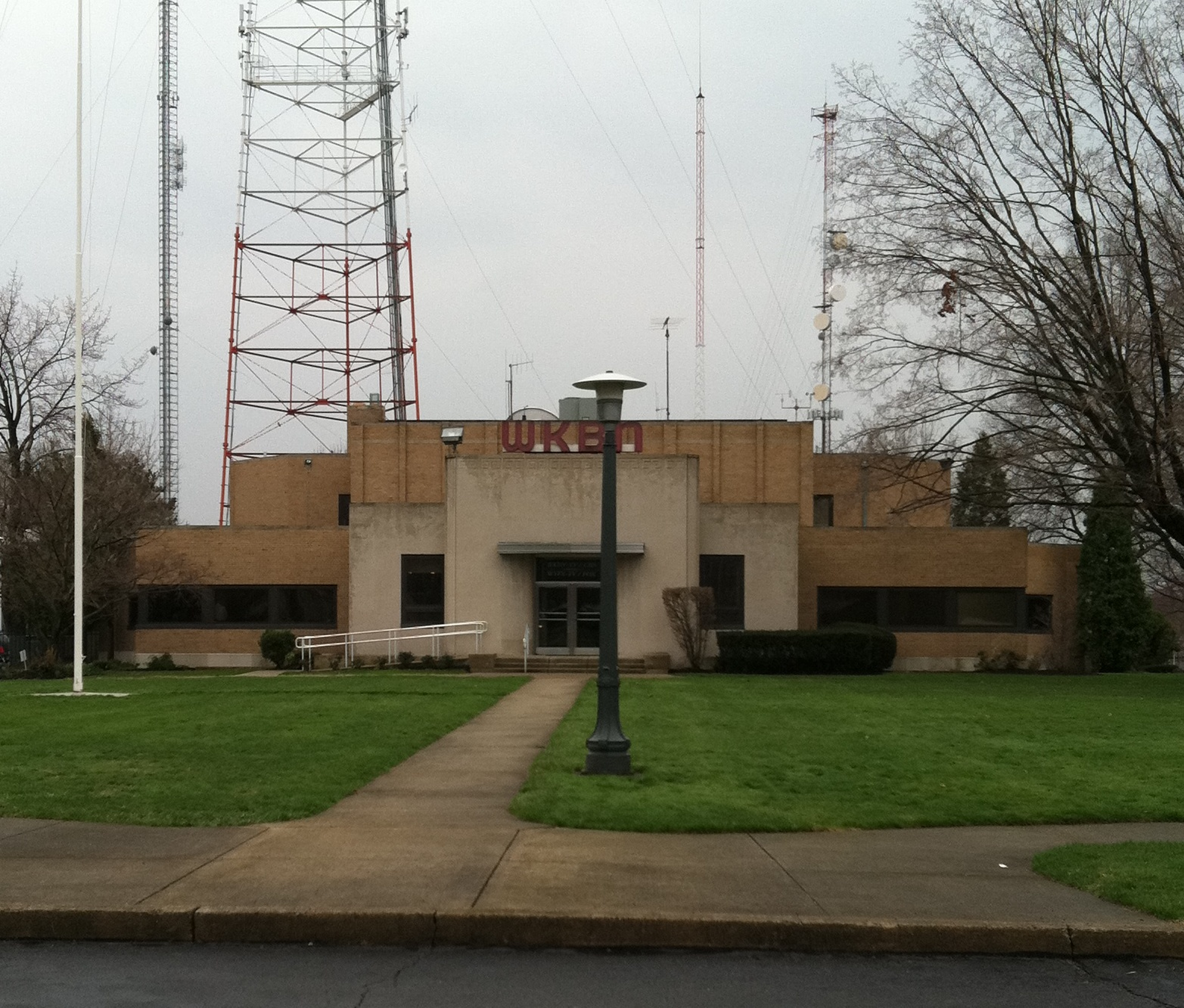
WKBN-TV studio

With 273,480 television households, the Youngstown market is the nation's 106th largest, according to Nielsen Media Research.

The market is served is served by four full power television stations, all of which are UHF stations. The Youngstown market's stations include: WFMJ-TV (channel 21, NBC, with The CW channel 21.2 under the WBCB call letters), WKBN-TV (channel 27, CBS), WYTV (channel 33, ABC, with MNTV on 33.2), and WNEO channel 45 (PBS).

Low power station WYFX-LD channel 62 serves as Youngstown's Fox affiliate, and is simulcast on WKBN 27.2.

=== Radio ===
==== AM ====
- 570 WKBN (News/talk)
- 1240 WBBW (Sports - Infinity)
- 1390 WNIO (Sports)

==== FM ====
- 88.5 WYSU (NPR)
- 91.7 WYTN (Christian - Family Radio)
- 93.3 WNCD (Classic rock)
- 95.9 WAKZ (Hip Hop and R&B)
- 98.9 WMXY (Adult contemporary)
- 101.1 WHOT (Contemporary hit radio)

== Transportation ==
=== Road ===
The city is directly served by Interstate 680, which connects the city with Interstate 80, Interstate 76 (the Ohio Turnpike), and Ohio State Route 11. I-680 begins at a junction with I-80 and SR 11, the start of the latter two routes' concurrency, in Austintown Township. Traveling southeast, I-680 passes through Youngstown, exiting southward from the city.

At I-680 exit 4A in the city, a freeway called the "Madison Avenue Expressway" begins. It first carries SR 193; at its second exit, the state route leaves the freeway and U.S. Route 422 joins. The Madison Avenue Expressway continues until reaching a junction with U.S. 62 and SR 7; after the junction, U.S. 422 comes to an at-grade intersection with Oak Street. At I-680 southbound exit 6B (northbound exit 6) in the city, a freeway called the "Himrod Avenue Expressway" begins; it carries US 62 and SR 7. The Himrod Avenue Expressway continues for over 1 mile (1.6 km) until reaching the same junction with the Madison Avenue Expressway (US 422); after the junction, U.S. 62 and SR 7 come to an at-grade intersection with Albert Street. Taken together, the Madison Avenue Expressway, the Himrod Avenue Expressway and the section of I-680 between the two form a freeway loop around Downtown Youngstown and the Youngstown State University campus.

The SR 711 freeway begins at a junction with I-680 in Youngstown and runs northeast and north out of the city and Mahoning County before terminating at a junction with I-80 and SR 11, the end of the latter two routes' concurrency, in Liberty Township. In addition to non-freeway sections of US 62, US 422, SR 7 and SR 193, state routes SR 170, SR 289, SR 616 and SR 625 serve the city. Ohio State Route 11, a north–south freeway, runs to the west of Youngstown. The Ohio Turnpike passes to the west and south of Youngstown.

In January 2025, the Eastgate Regional Council of Governments metropolitan planning organization received a $979,000 federal grant to study the possible conversion of a 1.5-mile (2.4 km) stretch of the Madison Avenue Expressway between Martin Luther King Jr. Boulevard (SR 289) and Andrews Avenue from a trenched freeway to a low-speed surface boulevard suitable for motorized vehicles, bicycles and pedestrians. The council says that the roadway infrastructure is deteriorating, the neighborhood split by the freeway would be reconnected and that 25 to 30 acres (10 to 12 ha) of land would be made available for new purposes. The plan could take 10 to 15 years to implement. Critics suggest that the council is not operating in the best interests of the city and that the transportation options provided by the freeway are beneficial to residents.

=== Public transit ===
The Youngstown area is served by the Western Reserve Transit Authority (WRTA) bus system, which is supported through Mahoning County property and sales taxes. WRTA, whose main terminal is in the downtown area, provides service throughout the city and into surrounding Mahoning and Trumbull counties. The downtown terminal serves as the Youngstown area's Greyhound terminal.

=== Air ===
The Youngstown-Warren Regional Airport is the primary airport for the region. As of 2022, no commercial airlines serve the airport, with Allegiant Air ending service on January 4, 2018. The airport is home to the Youngstown Air Reserve Station and 910th Airlift Wing. Smaller general aviation airports in the city and vicinity include Lansdowne Airport and Youngstown Elser Metro Airport.

=== Rail ===
In the vicinity of the WRTA terminal is a former Baltimore and Ohio Railroad station. The historic terminal building served B&O trains until 1971. Since converted into a banquet hall, it was a station along Amtrak's Three Rivers between Chicago and New York from 1995 to 2005. The nearest Amtrak service is the Capitol Limited at Alliance station 42 miles to the southwest. Freight rail lines owned by CSX Transportation, Norfolk Southern Railway, and the Youngstown and Southeastern Railroad still go through the area.

== Sister cities ==
- Spišská Nová Ves, Slovakia, since 1991

== See also ==
- List of people from Youngstown, Ohio
- "Youngstown" (Bruce Springsteen song)
- USS Youngstown

== Bibliography ==
- Aley, Howard C. (1975). A Heritage to Share: The Bicentennial History of Youngstown and the Mahoning Valley. Youngstown, OH: The Bicentennial Commission of Youngstown and Mahoning County, Ohio.
- Blue, Frederick J.; Jenkins, William D.; Lawson, William H.; Reedy, Joan M. (1995). Mahoning Memories: A History of Youngstown and Mahoning County. Virginia Beach, VA: The Donning Company. ISBN 0-89865-944-2.
- Brody, David (1960). Steelworkers in America. Cambridge, Massachusetts: Harvard University Press.
- Bruno, Robert (1999). Steelworker Alley: How Class Works in Youngstown. Ithaca, NY: Cornell University Press. ISBN 0-8014-3439-4.
- Fuechtmann, Thomas G. (1989). Steeples and Stacks: Religion and Steel Crisis in Youngstown. New York: Cambridge University Press. ISBN 0-521-33481-0.
- Jenkins, William D. (1990). Steel Valley Klan: The Ku Klux Klan in Ohio's Mahoning Valley. Kent, OH: Kent State University Press. ISBN 0-87338-415-6.
- Knepper, George W. (1989). Ohio and Its People. Kent, OH: Kent State University Press. ISBN 0-87338-377-X.
- Lemann, Nicholas (1991). The Promised Land: The Great Black Migration and How It Changed America. New York: Vintage Books. ISBN 0-679-73347-7.
- Linkon, Sherry Lee; Russo, John (2002). Steeltown U.S.A.: Work & Memory in Youngstown. Lawrence, KS: University Press of Kansas. ISBN 0-7006-1161-4.
- Warner, Jack L. (1964). My First Hundred Years in Hollywood. New York: Random House.
