= Schenley =

Neighborhood in Youngstown, Ohio, United States

- Neighborhood
- Schenley
- Location within Ohio Location within the United States
- Coordinates: 41.0922°N 80.6495°W
- Country: United States
- State: Ohio
- County: Mahoning County
- City: Youngstown
- Northern portion established: 1900-01-01
- Southern portion annexed from Youngstown Township: 1929-05-16

Area
  - Total: 2.2 sq mi (5.6 km^{2})
- Elevation: 982.589814 ft (299.4933752 m)

Population
  - Total: 4,546
  - Density: 2,100/sq mi (810/km^{2})
- Demonym: Schenlian
- Time zone: UTC-5 (Eastern Standard Time)
  - Summer (DST): UTC-4

Schenley (/ˈʃεnli/) is a neighborhood on the West Side of Youngstown, Ohio, United States. It is bordered by Belle Vista to the north, Mahoning Commons to the northeast, Oak Hill to the east, Warren to the southeast, Idora to the south, Kirkmere to the south, southwest, and west, and Austintown to the northwest.

The neighborhood's northwestern, northern, and eastern boundaries are defined by roads. (South Meridian Road, Mahoning Avenue, and Glenwood Avenue, respectively.) Schenley is home to the northernmost portion of Mill Creek Park, including Lake Glacier, the Wick Recreational Area, and the Lily Pond.

== History ==
The land that comprises Schenley was originally part of the Connecticut Western Reserve. Youngstown was founded in 1797, but the neighborhood of Schenley wasn't established until the 19th century. Schenley's development began at the confluence of Mill Creek and the Mahoning River, and the northern portion was a part of Youngstown before 1900, whereas the southern portion was part of Youngstown Township. However, when Youngstown Township was annexed by and incorporated into Youngstown in the 1929 annexation, a portion of it was added to Schenley's land area, creating its present-day borders.

== Geography ==
Schenley's borders are with the West Side neighborhoods of Kirkmere and Belle Vista, the Central neighborhood of Mahoning Commons, the South Side neighborhoods of Oak Hill, Warren, and Idora, and the census-designated place of Austintown, Ohio. Schenley is situated southwest of the Mahoning River, and its most northeastern point on Interstate 680 is just southeast of the Mahoning River - Mill Creek confluence. Schenley has a total area of 5.6 square kilometers, or 2.16217 square miles.

== Demographics ==
Schenley had a population of 4,546 in 2018, and the density was 810/km^{2} (2,100/sq mi). There were 2,140 households in the neighborhood with 2.1243 residents per house on average. Children under the age of 18 made up 17.7% of the population, while 18.4% were aged 50 or older. Schenley's population was 75.4% white, 13.7% black, 8.3% Hispanic, 1% mixed, 0.2% Asian, and 1.5% other races. 41.5% of households were inhabited by only one person, 31.1% had married couples, 14.4% were single women, 6.9% were single men, and 6.1% of households were identified as Other Non-Family.
