= Mill Creek =

Mill Creek or Millcreek may refer to:

== Communities ==
=== Canada ===
- Mill Creek, Cape Breton, Nova Scotia, in the Cape Breton Regional Municipality
- Mill Creek, Cumberland, Nova Scotia, in Cumberland country

=== United States ===
- Millcreek Township (disambiguation), several places
- Mill Creek, Pope County, Arkansas, an unincorporated community
- Mill Creek, Bakersfield, a district in Downtown Bakersfield, California
- Lundy, California, formerly known as Mill Creek
- Mill Creek, California, a town in Tehama County
- Mill Creek, Delaware, an unincorporated community in New Castle County
- Mill Creek Hundred, an unincorporated subdivision of New Castle County, Delaware
- Mill Creek, Georgia, an unincorporated community
- Mill Creek, Illinois, a village
- Mill Creek, Indiana, an unincorporated community in Lincoln Township, LaPorte County
- Millcreek, Missouri, an unincorporated community in Castor Township, Madison County
- Mill Creek, Oklahoma, a town
- Mill Creek, Pennsylvania, a borough in Huntingdon County
- Mill Creek, Philadelphia, a neighborhood
- Millcreek, Utah, a city in Salt Lake County
- Mill Creek, Washington, a city in Snohomish County
- Mill Creek East, Washington, a CDP in Snohomish County
- Mill Creek, West Virginia, a town in Randolph County
- Mill Creek, Wisconsin, a ghost town
- Mill Creek Community, Wisconsin, an unincorporated community

== Streams ==
=== Canada ===
- Mill Creek Ravine, Edmonton, Alberta, on a tributary of the North Saskatchewan River

=== United States ===
==== California ====
- Mill Creek (Los Angeles County, California), a mountain stream in the Angeles National Forest and a major tributary of Big Tujunga Creek
- Mill Creek (Mono Lake), in the endorheic Mono-Mojave subregion
- Mill Creek (Napa County), a tributary to the Napa River
- Mill Creek (San Bernardino County), a tributary of the Santa Ana River
- Mill Creek (Del Norte County, California) in the Del Norte Coast Redwoods State Park
- Mill Creek (San Vicente Creek tributary), a tributary of San Vicente Creek in Santa Cruz County
- Mill Creek (Tehama County), a tributary of the Sacramento River
- Mill Creek (Tulare County), a tributary of the Kaweah River
- Old Mill Creek (Arroyo Corte Madera del Presidio), a tributary to Arroyo Corte Madera del Presidio, and thence to Richardson Bay in Marin County

==== Colorado ====
- Mill Creek (San Juan River tributary)

==== Delaware ====
- Mill Creek (Blackbird Creek tributary), a stream in New Castle County
- Mill Creek (Smyrna River tributary), a stream in Kent County
- Mill Creek (White Clay Creek tributary), a stream in New Castle County

==== Georgia ====
- Mill Creek (Etowah River tributary)
- Mill Creek (Muckalee Creek tributary)

==== Indiana ====
- Mill Creek (Jackson County, Indiana), a tributary of the White River

==== Iowa ====
- Mill Creek (Jackson County, Iowa), a tributary of the Upper Mississippi River
- Mill Creek (Johnson County, Iowa)
- Mill Creek (Nodaway River tributary), a stream in Iowa and Missouri

==== Maryland ====
- Mill Creek (Marshyhope Creek tributary), a stream in Dorchester County

==== Michigan ====
- Mill Creek (Huron River tributary)
- Mill Creek (Paw Paw River tributary)

==== Missouri ====
- Mill Creek (Barren Fork)
- Mill Creek (Big River tributary)
- Mill Creek (Crane Pond Creek tributary)
- Mill Creek (Eleven Point River tributary), a stream in Arkansas and Missouri
- Mill Creek (Elk River tributary), a stream in Arkansas and Missouri
- Mill Creek (Grandglaize Creek tributary)
- Mill Creek (Little Piney Creek tributary), a stream in Phelps County in the Ozarks
- Mill Creek (Loutre River tributary)
- Mill Creek (Morgan County, Missouri)
- Mill Creek (Niangua River tributary)
- Mill Creek (Nodaway River tributary), a stream in Iowa and Missouri
- Mill Creek (River aux Vases)

==== New Jersey ====
- Mill Creek Marsh, flows into the Hackensack River

==== New York ====
- Mill Creek (Black Creek tributary), flows into Hinckley Reservoir
- Mill Creek (Black River tributary), flows into the Black River near Boonville
- Mill Creek (Black River, Lyons Falls), flows into the Black River near Lyons Falls
- Mill Creek (Black River, Watson), flows into the Black River in Watson
- Mill Creek (Fall Creek tributary), a tributary of Fall Creek
- Mill Creek (Gravesville, New York), a tributary of West Canada Creek
- Mill Creek (Hudson River tributary), in Rensselaer County
- Mill Creek (Jamaica Bay), a small stream in Brooklyn that empties into Jamaica Bay
- Mill Creek, a buried stream in Queens also called Kissena Creek
- Mill Creek (Nobleboro, New York), a tributary of West Canada Creek
- Mill Creek (Owasco Inlet), a tributary of Owasco Inlet in Cayuga County
- Mill Creek (Susquehanna River tributary, Otego), a tributary of the Susquehanna River
- Mill Creek (West Kill), converges with West Kill by North Blenheim
- Mill Creek (Wharton Creek tributary), a tributary of Wharton Creek

==== North Carolina ====
- Mill Creek (Pee Dee River tributary), a stream in Anson County
- Mill Creek (Coddle Creek tributary), a stream in Cabarrus and Rowan Counties
- Mill Creek (Trent River tributary), a stream in Jones County
- Mill Creek (Little River tributary), a stream in Moore County
- Mill Creek (Deep River tributary), a stream in Randolph County
- Mill Creek (Uwharrie River tributary), a stream in Randolph County
- Mill Creek (Lanes Creek tributary), a stream in Union County
- Mill Creek (Richardson Creek tributary), a stream in Union County

==== Ohio ====
- Mill Creek (Ohio), a tributary of the Ohio River
- Mill Creek (Scioto River tributary), a stream in central Ohio

==== Oregon ====
- Mill Creek (Marion County, Oregon), a tributary of the Willamette River
- Mill Creek (Mohawk River tributary), a tributary of the Mohawk River in Lane County

==== Pennsylvania ====
- Mill Creek (Delaware River tributary), a stream in Bucks County
- Mill Creek (Neshaminy Creek tributary, Doylestown Township), a stream in Bucks County
- Mill Creek (Neshaminy Creek tributary, Northampton Township), a stream in Bucks County
- Mill Creek (Neshaminy Creek tributary, Wrightstown Township), a stream in Bucks County
- Mill Creek (Clarion River tributary), a stream in Clarion and Jefferson Counties
- Mill Creek (Roaring Creek tributary), a stream in Columbia County
- Mill Creek (Lake Erie), a tributary of Lake Erie and a stream in Erie County
- Mill Creek (Juniata River tributary), a stream in Huntingdon County
- Mill Creek (Lackawanna River tributary), a stream in Lackawanna and Lycoming Counties
- Mill Creek (Conestoga River tributary), a stream in Lancaster County
- Mill Creek (Reilly Creek tributary), a stream in Luzerne County
- Mill Creek (Loyalsock Creek tributary), a stream in Lycoming and Sullivan Counties
- Mill Creek (Susquehanna River tributary), a stream in Luzerne County
- Mill Creek (French Creek tributary), a stream in Mercer and Venango Counties
- Mill Creek (Lower Merion, Pennsylvania), a tributary of the Schuylkill River upstream of Philadelphia
- Mill Creek (Philadelphia), a tributary of the Schuylkill River and a stream in Montgomery County and Philadelphia City
- Mill Creek (Tioga River tributary), a stream in Tioga County
- Mill Creek (Whitelock Creek tributary), a tributary of Whitelock Creek and a stream in Wyoming County

==== Tennessee ====
- Mill Creek (Davidson County, Tennessee), a tributary of the Cumberland River

==== Texas ====
- Mill Creek (Brazos River tributary), a river draining into the Brazos River

==== Virginia ====
- Mill Creek (Whitethorn Creek tributary), a stream in Pittsylvania County

==== West Virginia ====
- Mill Creek (North Fork South Branch Potomac River tributary), a tributary of the North Fork South Branch Potomac River
- Mill Creek (Opequon Creek tributary)
- Mill Creek (Patterson Creek tributary), a tributary of Patterson Creek
- Mill Creek (South Branch Potomac River tributary), a tributary of the South Branch Potomac River
- Mill Creek (western West Virginia), a tributary of the Ohio River

==== Washington ====
- Mill Creek (Thurston County, Washington)
- Mill Creek (Walla Walla River tributary)

==== Wisconsin ====
- Mill Creek (Wisconsin River tributary)

== Other uses ==
- Dousman's Mill, formerly Historic Mill Creek Discovery Park, Historic Mill Creek State Park and Old Mill Creek State Historic Park in Michigan
- Mill Creek (Bakersfield), a linear park in downtown Bakersfield, California; adjacent to the Kern Island Canal
- Millcreek Canyon (Salt Lake County, Utah)
- Mill Creek chert, a type of stone from southern Illinois used extensively by the Mississippian culture
- Mill Creek Correctional Facility, Salem, Oregon
- Mill Creek Expressway, Ohio
- Mill Creek Generating Station, a coal-fired power plant in Louisville, Kentucky
- Mill Creek Elementary School, Warrington, Pennsylvania
- Mill Creek High School, in Hoschton, Georgia
- Mill Creek Park, in Youngstown, Ohio
- Millcreek Mall, shopping center in Erie, Pennsylvania
- The Mall at Mill Creek, Secaucus, New Jersey
- Millcreek (UTA station), a transit station in South Salt Lake, Utah
- Mill Creek Zanja, California

== See also ==
- Mill River (disambiguation)
- Mill (disambiguation)
- Mills Creek (disambiguation)
- Mill Creek Bridge (disambiguation)
- Mill Brook (disambiguation)
- Mill Creek Valley, a former neighborhood in St. Louis, Missouri
- Mill Rock Creek, a stream in Crawford and Iron counties, Missouri; a tributary of Huzzah Creek
- Mill Spring Creek, a small stream in Wayne County, Missouri; a tributary of the Black River
- Mill Valley Creek in Pickleweed Inlet, a small bay in Marin County
