= Collins Creek =

Collins Creek may refer to:

- Collins Creek (Idaho), a stream in Idaho
- Collins Creek (Haw River tributary), a stream in Chatham and Orange Counties, North Carolina
- Collins Creek (Pennsylvania), a stream in Pennsylvania
- Collins Creek (Kentucky), a tributary of Goose Creek
- Collin Creek, a now-defunct mall in Plano, TX
