= Mill Creek Township, Ohio =

Mill Creek Township, Ohio may refer to several places:

- Mill Creek Township, Coshocton County, Ohio
- Mill Creek Township, Hamilton County, Ohio
- Mill Creek Township, Williams County, Ohio

== See also ==
- Mill Creek (disambiguation)
- Millcreek Township (disambiguation)
