= Millbrook =

Millbrook may refer to:

== Geographic places ==
=== Australia ===
- Millbrook, Victoria
- Millbrook, Western Australia, a locality of the City of Albany

=== Canada ===
- Millbrook First Nation, including the community Millbrook 27, Nova Scotia
- Millbrook, Ontario

=== New Zealand ===
- Millbrook Resort, a luxury resort near Queenstown

=== United Kingdom ===
- Millbrook, Bedfordshire, a village
  - Home to the Millbrook Proving Ground
- Millbrook, Cornwall, a village
  - Home to Millbrook AFC, who play at Jenkins Park
- Millbrook, Southampton, a district of Southampton, England
  - Home to Millbrook FC, who play at Test Park
- Millbrook, Axminster, an area of Axminster, Devon
- Millbrook, North Molton, a location in Devon
- Millbrook, Greater Manchester, an area of Stalybridge

=== United States ===
- Millbrook, Alabama
- Millbrook, Illinois
- Millbrook, Kansas
- Millbrook, Missouri
- Millbrook, New Jersey
- Millbrook, New York
- Millbrook, North Carolina
- Millbrook, Ohio
- Millbrook, Pennsylvania
- Millbrook, West Virginia
- Millbrook, Wyoming

== People ==
- Millbrook (musician), a music record producer and video game developer

== Other ==
- Millbrook, common designation for the Hitchcock Estate in Millbrook, New York, associated with Timothy Leary
- Millbrook Commonwealth Action Programme, a programme of the Commonwealth of Nations agreed at Millbrook Resort
- Millbrook (Crewe, Virginia), listed on the National Register of Historic Places in Nottoway County, Virginia
- Millbrook High School (disambiguation)
- Millbrook, Indiana, fictional town in the 2005 film A History of Violence
- Millbrook Primary School, Grove, Oxfordshire, England
- Millbrook, Toowoomba, a heritage house in Queensland, Australia
- Millbrook Winery, a winery and restaurant at Jarrahdale, in the Perth Hills wine region of Western Australia
- Millbrook Press, an American children's book publisher

== See also ==
- Mill Brook (disambiguation)
- Molenbeek (disambiguation)
