= Walnut Valley Branch =

Stream in the U.S. state of Missouri

Walnut Valley Branch is a stream in Oregon County in the Ozarks of southern Missouri.

The stream headwaters are at 36°42′30″N 91°30′05″W and its confluence with Mill Creek is at 36°45′37″N 91°30′43″W. The source area for the stream lies about 5.5 miles west of Alton. The stream flows generally north passing under U.S. Route 160 and through an area of deeply incised meanders prior to entering Mill Creek.

A variant name was "Walnut Branch". The stream was so named on account of walnut trees near its course.

== See also ==
- List of rivers of Missouri
