= Mill River =

Mill River may refer to:

== Rivers in the United States ==
- Mill River (Connecticut), in New Haven County
- Mill River (Fairfield, Connecticut)
- Mill River, in Stamford, Connecticut, part of the Rippowam River
- Mill River (Harrington Bay), in Washington County, Maine
- Mill River (Saint George River tributary), in Thomaston, Maine
- Mill River (Massachusetts–Rhode Island)
- Mill River (Northampton, Massachusetts)
- Mill River (Springfield, Massachusetts)
- Mill River (Taunton River tributary), in Taunton, Massachusetts
- Mill River (Otter Creek tributary), in Rutland County, Vermont

== Other uses ==
- Mill River, New Haven, Connecticut, U.S.
- Mill River, Massachusetts, U.S.
  - Mill River Historic District
- Mill River East, Prince Edward Island, Canada
- Mill River Union High School, in Clarendon, Vermont, U.S.

== See also ==
- Mill (disambiguation)
- Mill Creek (disambiguation)
- Mills River
