= Morven Township, Anson County, North Carolina =

Coordinates: 34.85375°N 79.96893°W

- Township
- Location of Morven Township in Anson County

- Location of Anson County in North Carolina
- Country: United States
- State: North Carolina
- County: Anson

Area
  - Total: 48.54 sq mi (125.72 km^{2})
- Highest elevation (high point at northwest part of township): 434 ft (132 m)
- Lowest elevation (Pee Dee River where it flows out of the township (se side)): 86 ft (26 m)

Population (2010)
  - Total: 2,065
  - Density: 42.67/sq mi (16.47/km^{2})
- Time zone: UTC-4 (EST)
  - Summer (DST): UTC-5 (EDT)
- Area code: 704

Morven Township, population 2,065, is one of eight townships in Anson County, North Carolina, United States. Morven Township is 48.39 square miles (125.3 km^{2}) in size and located in southeastern Anson County. Morven Township contains the towns of Morven and McFarlan within it.

== Geography ==
Jones Creek and North Fork of Jones Creek forms the northern boundary of Morven Township. The central part of the township is drained by the Pee Dee River and its tributary, Mill Creek. The southeastern part of the township is drained by another Pee Dee River tributary, Whortenberry Creek.
