= Mill Creek Park Suspension Bridge =

- U.S. National Register of Historic Places
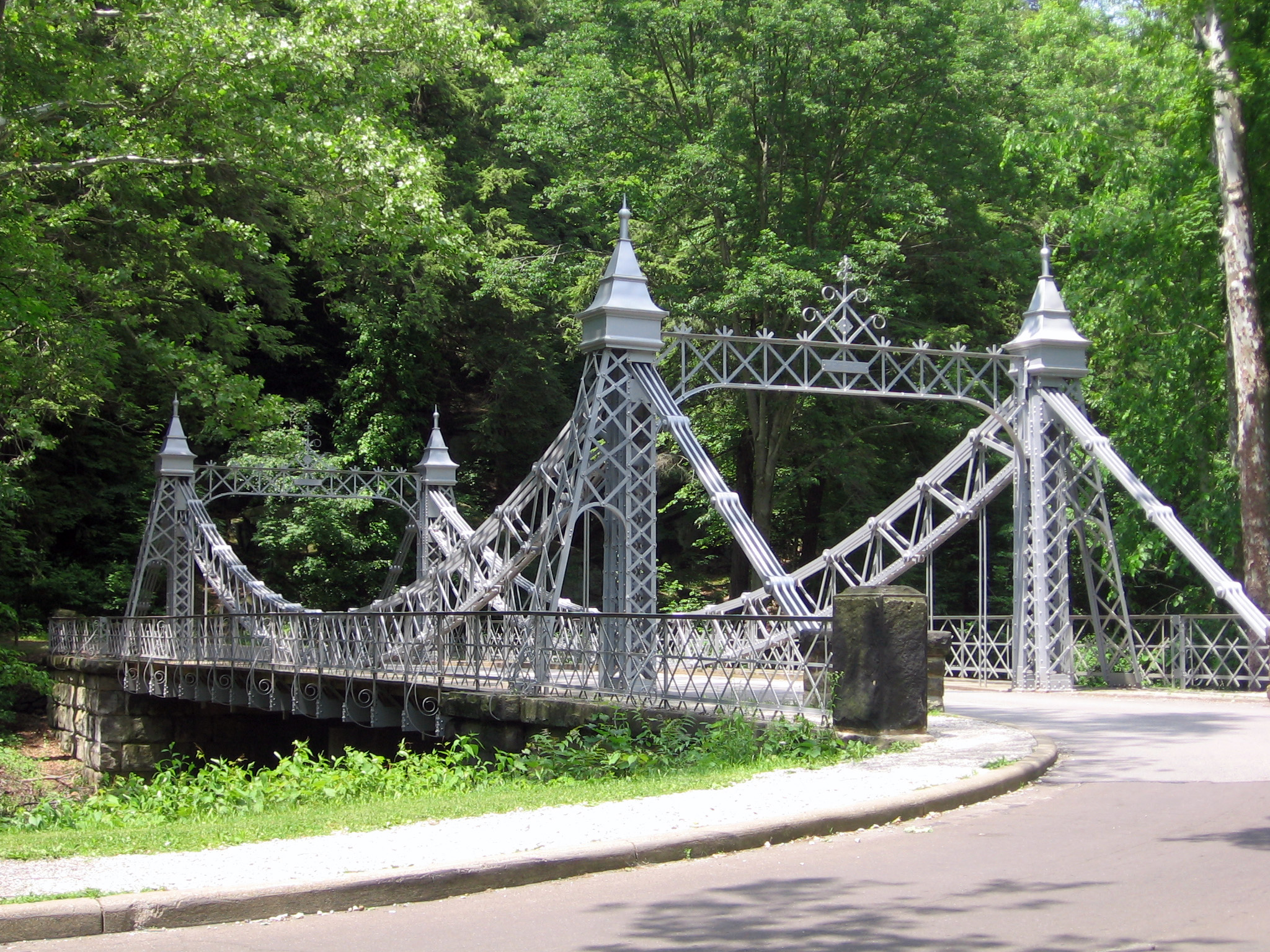

- Location within Ohio Location within the United States
- Location: Mill Creek Park, Youngstown, Ohio
- Coordinates: 41°4′24″N 80°41′21″W
- Area: less than one acre
- Built: 1895
- Built by: Youngstown Bridge Co.
- NRHP reference No.: 76001482
- Added to NRHP: October 29, 1976

The Mill Creek Park Suspension Bridge is a bridge in Youngstown, Ohio, United States. The 1895 bridge carries Valley Drive across Mill Creek to connect the east and west sides of Mill Creek Park. Following the wishes of Volney Rogers to create fanciful park entrances, Charles Fowler of the Youngstown Bridge Co. designed the structure. The Suspension Bridge is the oldest of six bridges in Mill Creek Park. It measures 86 feet long and 32 feet wide and was listed on the National Register of Historic Places in 1976. It has been called the Silver Bridge, the Cinderella Bridge, the Castle Bridge, and the Walt Disney Bridge. In the summer and fall of 2007, the Suspension Bridge went through a major rehabilitation project to repair the historic structure, restore its visual prominence and improve its structural integrity. The project was coordinated through consultation with the Mahoning Valley Historical Society, Youngstown State University, the Ohio Historic Preservation Office and additional agencies. A Federal Highway Administration Enhancement Grant, secured through the Eastgate Regional Council of Governments, covered 80% of the total project cost. The bridge has been restored to its original splendor, reflecting its history, legacy, aesthetic appeal, cultural prominence and regional character.
