= Millcreek Township, Clarion County, Pennsylvania =

Township in Pennsylvania, US

Coordinates: 41°16′07″N 79°14′40″W

- Township
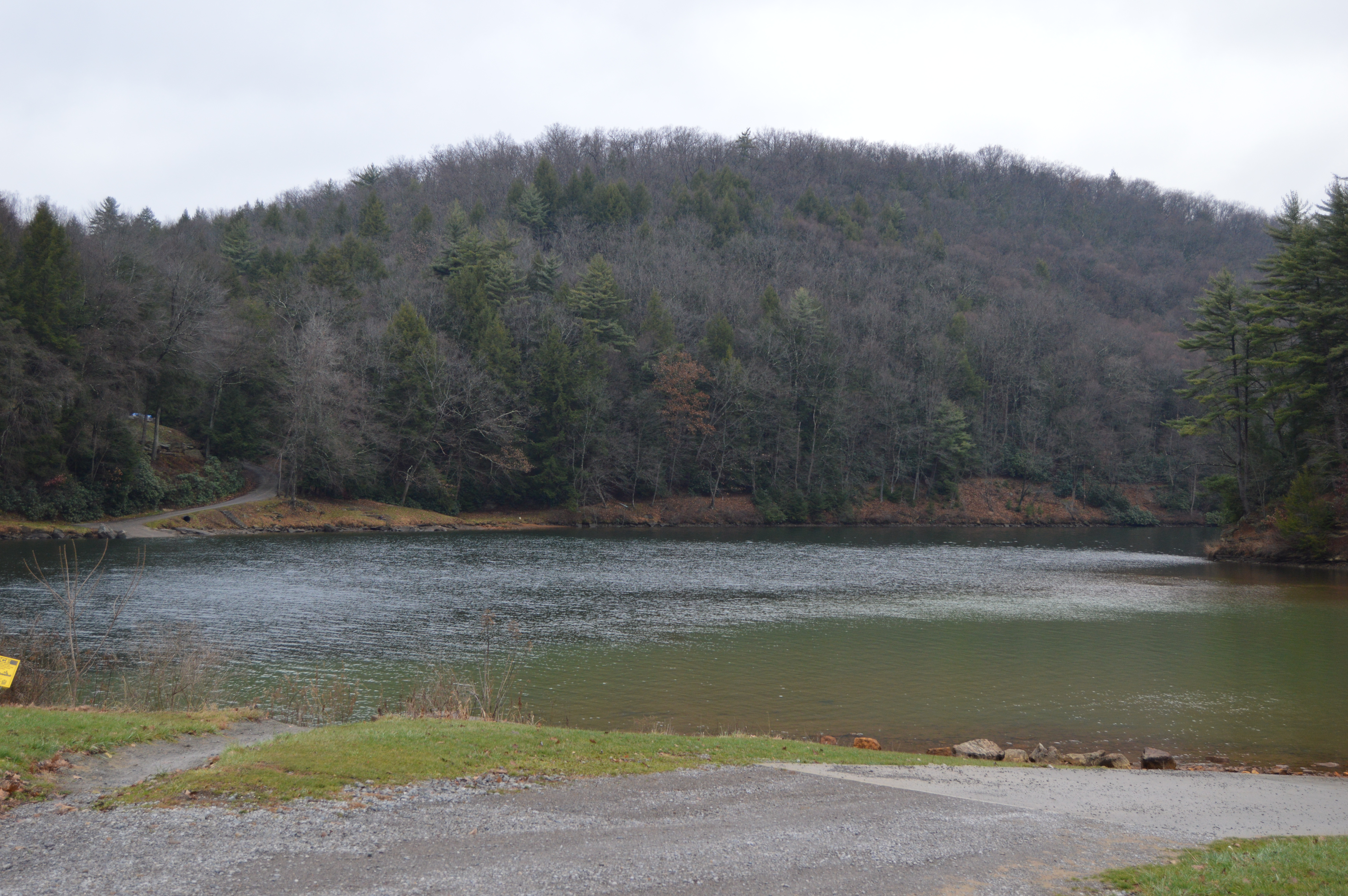
- Confluence of the namesake Mill Creek with the Clarion River

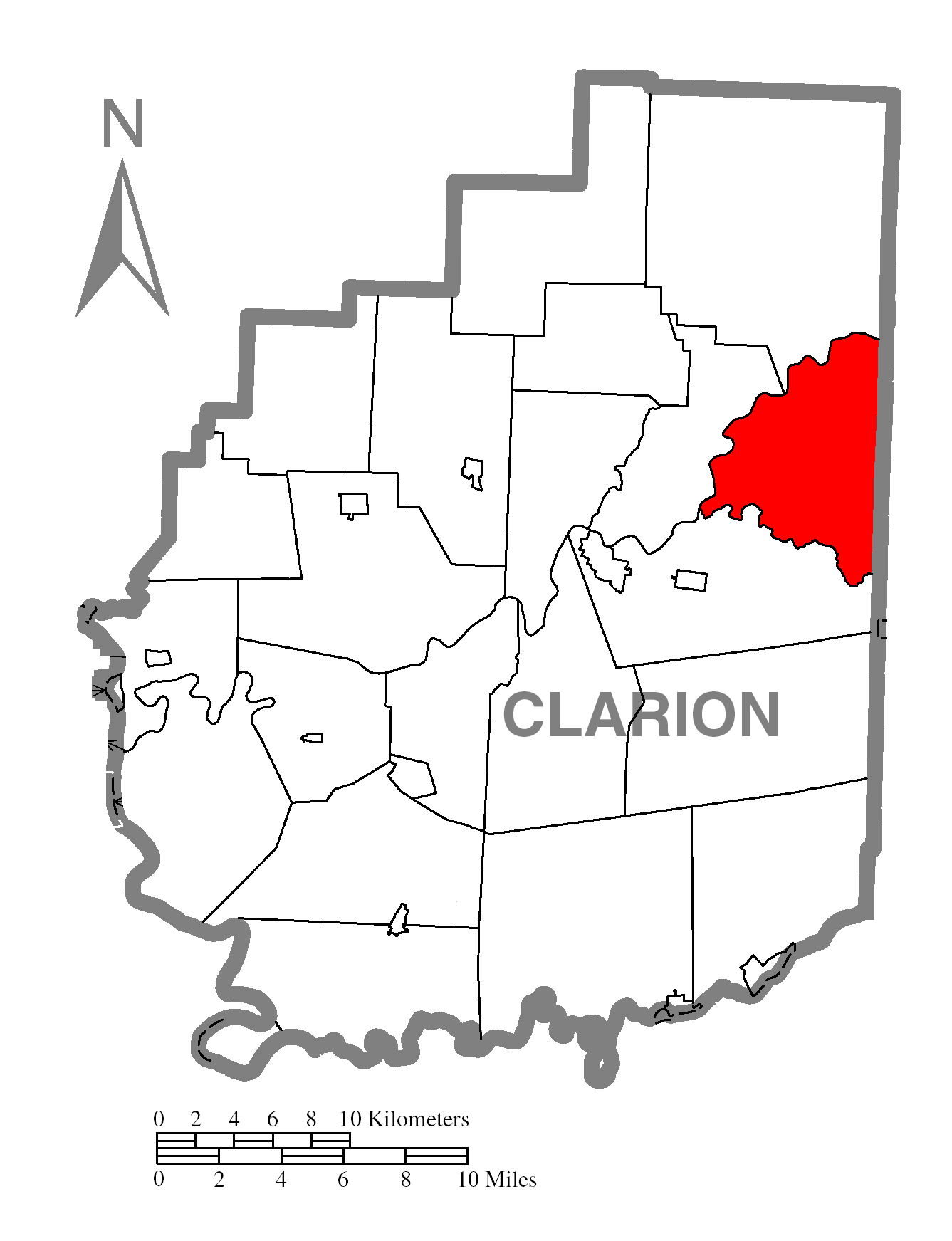
- Map of Clarion County, Pennsylvania highlighting Millcreek Township

- Map of Clarion County, Pennsylvania
- Country: United States
- State: Pennsylvania
- County: Clarion
- Settled: 1820

Area
  - Total: 29.25 sq mi (75.76 km^{2})
  - Land: 28.94 sq mi (74.96 km^{2})
  - Water: 0.31 sq mi (0.80 km^{2})

Population (2020)
  - Total: 361
  - Estimate (2022): 359
  - Density: 12.5/sq mi (4.82/km^{2})
- Time zone: UTC-5 (Eastern (EST))
  - Summer (DST): UTC-4 (EDT)
- FIPS code: 42-031-49536
- Website: https://www.millcreektwpclarion.com/

Millcreek Township is a township in Clarion County, Pennsylvania, United States. The population was 361 at the 2020 census, a decrease from the figure of 396 tabulated in 2010.

== Geography ==
The township is in northeastern Clarion County, bordered on the east by Jefferson County, on the northwest by the Clarion River, and on the southwest by its tributaries Mill Creek and Little Mill Creek. The unincorporated community of Fisher is near the center of the township. According to the United States Census Bureau, the township has a total area of 29.3 square miles (75.8 km^{2}), of which 29.0 square miles (75.0 km^{2}) is land and 0.31 square miles (0.8 km^{2}), or 1.06%, is water.

== Demographics ==
Historical population
Census	Pop.	Note	%±
2010	396		—
2020	361		−8.8%
2022 (est.)	359		−0.6%
U.S. Decennial Census

As of the census of 2000, there were 415 people, 178 households, and 126 families residing in the township. The population density was 14.3 people per square mile (5.5 people/km^{2}). There were 496 housing units at an average density of 17.1 per square mile (6.6/km^{2}). The racial makeup of the township was 98.55% White, 0.48% African American, and 0.96% from two or more races.

There were 178 households, out of which 20.8% had children under the age of 18 living with them, 64.6% were married couples living together, 2.8% had a female householder with no husband present, and 28.7% were non-families. 24.7% of all households were made up of individuals, and 7.9% had someone living alone who was 65 years of age or older. The average household size was 2.33 and the average family size was 2.76.

In the township the population was spread out, with 18.8% under the age of 18, 6.7% from 18 to 24, 28.7% from 25 to 44, 28.9% from 45 to 64, and 16.9% who were 65 years of age or older. The median age was 43 years. For every 100 females there were 111.7 males. For every 100 females age 18 and over, there were 108.0 males.

The median income for a household in the township was $40,625, and the median income for a family was $46,500. Males had a median income of $38,281 versus $17,143 for females. The per capita income for the township was $22,329. None of the families and 0.9% of the population were living below the poverty line, including no under eighteens and 2.9% of those over 64.
