= Fisher, Pennsylvania =

Unincorporated community in Pennsylvania, US

- Unincorporated community
- Motto: "Everything Leans Towards Fisher"
- Location within Pennsylvania
- Coordinates: 41°15′59″N 79°14′33″W
- Country: United States
- State: Pennsylvania
- County: Clarion
- Township: Millcreek

Area
  - Total: 0.245 sq mi (0.63 km^{2})
- Elevation: 1,594 ft (486 m)
- Time zone: UTC-5 (Eastern (EST))
  - Summer (DST): UTC-4 (EDT)
- ZIP code: 16225
- Area code: 814
- GNIS feature ID: 1174812

Fisher is an unincorporated community in Clarion County, Pennsylvania, United States. The community is 8.3 miles (13.4 km) east-northeast of Clarion. Fisher formerly had a post office with ZIP code 16225. The village was founded in 1835.
