= Lidy Creek =

Lidy Creek Leidys Creek, Lidy's Creek

Physical characteristics
- Source
  - location: hill in Pittston Township, Pennsylvania
  - elevation: between 1,020 and 1,040 feet (310 and 320 m)
- Mouth
  - location: Mill Creek in Dupont, Luzerne County, Pennsylvania
  - coordinates: 41°19′33″N 75°44′49″W
  - elevation: 709 ft (216 m)
- Length: 1.9 mi (3.1 km)
- Basin size: 1.50 mi^{2} (3.9 km^{2})

Basin features
- Progression: Mill Creek → Lackawanna River → Susquehanna River → Chesapeake Bay

Lidy Creek (also known as Leidys Creek or Lidy's Creek) is a tributary of Mill Creek in Luzerne County, Pennsylvania, in the United States. It is approximately 1.9 miles (3.1 km) long and flows through Pittston Township and Dupont. The watershed of the creek has an area of 1.50 square miles (3.9 km^{2}). It is a Coldwater Fishery and is not impaired. The creek is in the vicinity of the Wilkes-Barre/Scranton International Airport and the International Trade Zone Industrial Park.

== Course ==
Lidy Creek begins on a hill in Pittston Township. It flows north-northwest for a short distance before turning northwest for a few tenths of a mile, crossing Interstate 476 and entering Dupont. It then turns west-northwest before turning west-southwest. Several tenths of a mile further downstream, the creek turns west-northwest and crosses Interstate 81. Several tenths of a mile further downstream, it reaches its confluence with Mill Creek.

Lidy Creek joins Mill Creek 2.46 miles (3.96 km) upstream of its mouth.

== Hydrology ==
Lidy Creek is not considered to be impaired. However, it loses some water to mine pools, as does the nearby Collins Creek. The borough of Dupont has a permit to discharge stormwater into the creek.

== Geography and geology ==
The elevation near the mouth of Lidy Creek is 709 feet (216 m) above sea level. The elevation near the creek's source is between 1,020 and 1,040 feet (310 and 320 m) above sea level.

The headwaters of Lidy Creek are on a ridge above the Wilkes-Barre/Scranton International Airport. The creek also flows through the International Trade Zone Industrial Park.

== Watershed and biology ==
The watershed of Lidy Creek has an area of 1.50 square miles (3.9 km^{2}). The watershed is in the southwestern part of the Lackawanna River watershed. It occupies parts of Pittston Township and Dupont. The stream is entirely within the United States Geological Survey quadrangle of Avoca. It is one of the two major tributaries of Mill Creek.

Lidy Creek is considered to be a Coldwater Fishery. The habitats in the upper reaches of the creek's watershed are "high quality" and mountainous (as is the case with Collins Creek).

== History ==
Lidy Creek was entered into the Geographic Names Information System on August 2, 1979. Its identifier in the Geographic Names Information System is 1179320. The creek is also known as Leidys Creek. This name has appeared on county highway maps published by the Pennsylvania Department of Transportation.

Bank restoration work on Lidy Creek was planned in 2009. Future runway expansions of the Wilkes-Barre/Scranton International Airport may lead to the relocation of the creek.

== See also ==
- Collins Creek, next tributary of Mill Creek going upstream
- List of rivers of Pennsylvania
- List of tributaries of the Lackawanna River
