= Mills Creek =

Mills Creek may refer to:

- Mills Creek (Missouri), a stream in Missouri
- Mills Creek, a San Francisco Bay Area stream with mouth at Arroyo León (37.4460518°N 122.4052519°W)
- Mills Creek, a California stream with headwaters on the Sierra Crest at the Mills Creek cirque (37.348872°N 118.786583°W)
- Mills Creek (San Mateo County), a stream flowing through Burlingame to the San Francisco Bay
