= Mill Creek Park =

Metropolitan park in Ohio, United States

Coordinates: 41°2′N 80°42′W

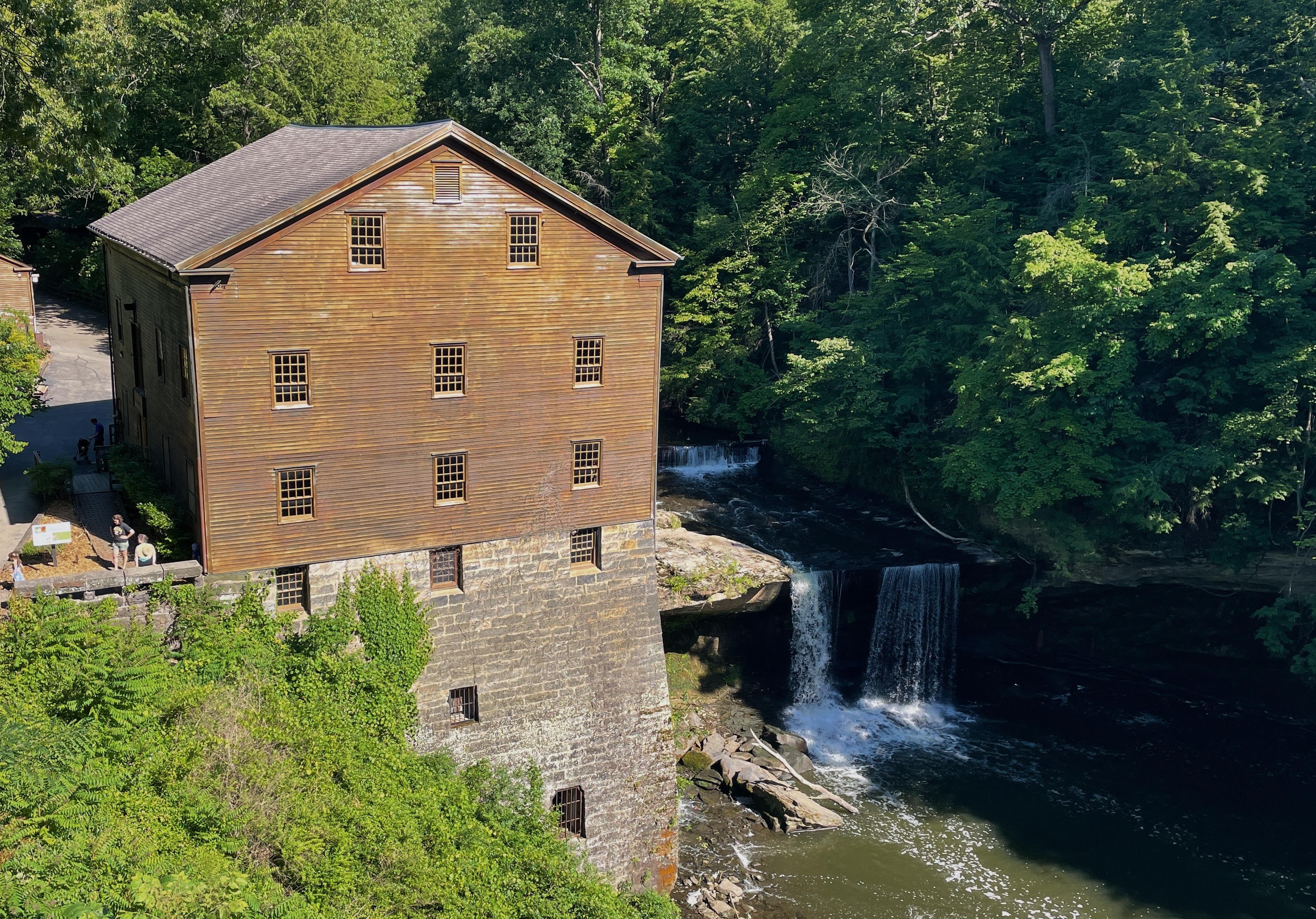
- Lanterman's Mill
- Interactive map of Mill Creek Park
- Type: Metropolitan park
- Location: Youngstown and Boardman, Ohio, US
- Area: 2,658 acres (1,076 ha)
- Created: 1891
- Operator: Mill Creek MetroParks

Mill Creek Park is an urban park in Youngstown and Boardman, Ohio. It stretches from the near west side of Youngstown through unincorporated Boardman Township. The park encompasses 2,658 acres (1,076 ha), including three lakes and 45 miles (72 km) of recreational trails. The Trust for Public Land ranks one part of Mill Creek as the 142nd largest park located within the limits of a US city.

== History ==
Mill Creek Park was founded in 1891 by Youngstown attorney Volney Rogers. Rogers secured options on much of the land and was able to purchase tracts of it from more than 90 landowners. Once the land was secured, Rogers framed and promoted what he called the "Township Park Improvement Law". Upon the law's passage, Rogers turned over all of the land he had secured for park purposes. Rogers had the area declared a park by the Ohio General Assembly. It officially opened in 1893.

Rogers enlisted the help of his brother Bruce, who had studied landscape architecture and became the first park superintendent. In 1899, the project benefited from the contributions of well-known landscape architect Charles Eliot. The Olmsted Brothers firm provided extensive design work from 1923 to 1962.

The same year that the park opened, the Mahoning County commissioners issued bonds to pay for the parkland, and Rogers purchased $25,000 of them, with the understanding that they would be the last ones paid. Ironically, the financial panic of 1893 facilitated the park's development. As a later newspaper account observed: "Unemployed men found work there. A second bond issue paid for their wages. The men cut trails, established drives, restored Pioneer Pavilion (a renovated factory building that was the oldest structure in the park) and built Lake Cohasset Dam".

== Recreational areas ==
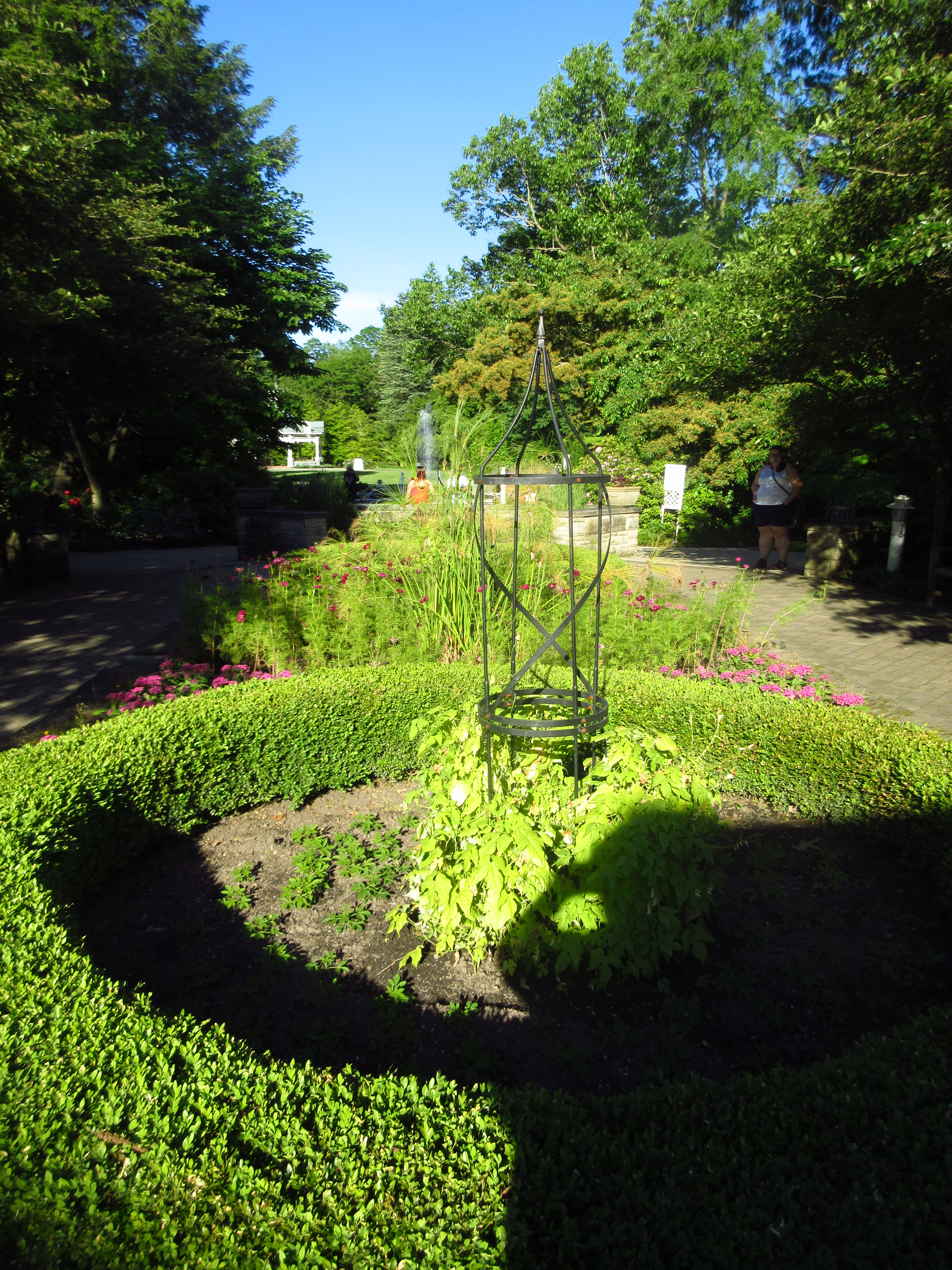
Formal entrance to Fellows Riverside Gardens

Fellows Riverside Gardens is a public garden located at the northern end of Mill Creek Park.

The Ford Nature Education Center opened to the public in 1972 as the headquarters for the Park's nature education programs in the northern part of Mill Creek Park. The education center is housed within the stone mansion donated to the Park in 1968.

Lanterman's Mill was built in 1845–46 by German Lanterman and Samuel Kimberly, and restored in 1982–85.

Mill Creek Golf Course features two 18-hole courses designed by Donald Ross that opened to the public in 1928.

== Lakes, ponds and wetlands ==
Mill Creek Park contains three man-made lakes, a pond and a wetland. Lake Cohasset, the oldest of Mill Creek Park's lakes, was built in 1897 and is known for its hemlocks. The name comes from the Algonquin word "Conahasset", meaning "long rocky place". This 28-acre lake offers visitors a secluded place to view wildlife in their natural habitats. Boating and fishing are not permitted on Lake Cohasset.

Lake Glacier was created in 1906 by the damming of Mill Creek at the "narrows" as it approached the Mahoning River.

In 1924, Alice Baldwin Lewis donated 70 acres of land specifying that part of the land was to be used for creating a lake. Mill Creek meandered through this shallow valley making it a suitable site for a man-made lake. In 1928 a dam was built, creating what is now known as Lake Newport, the largest of Mill Creek Park's three lakes.

== See also ==
- Mill Creek Park Suspension Bridge
- Mill Creek (disambiguation)
