= Easton Creek =

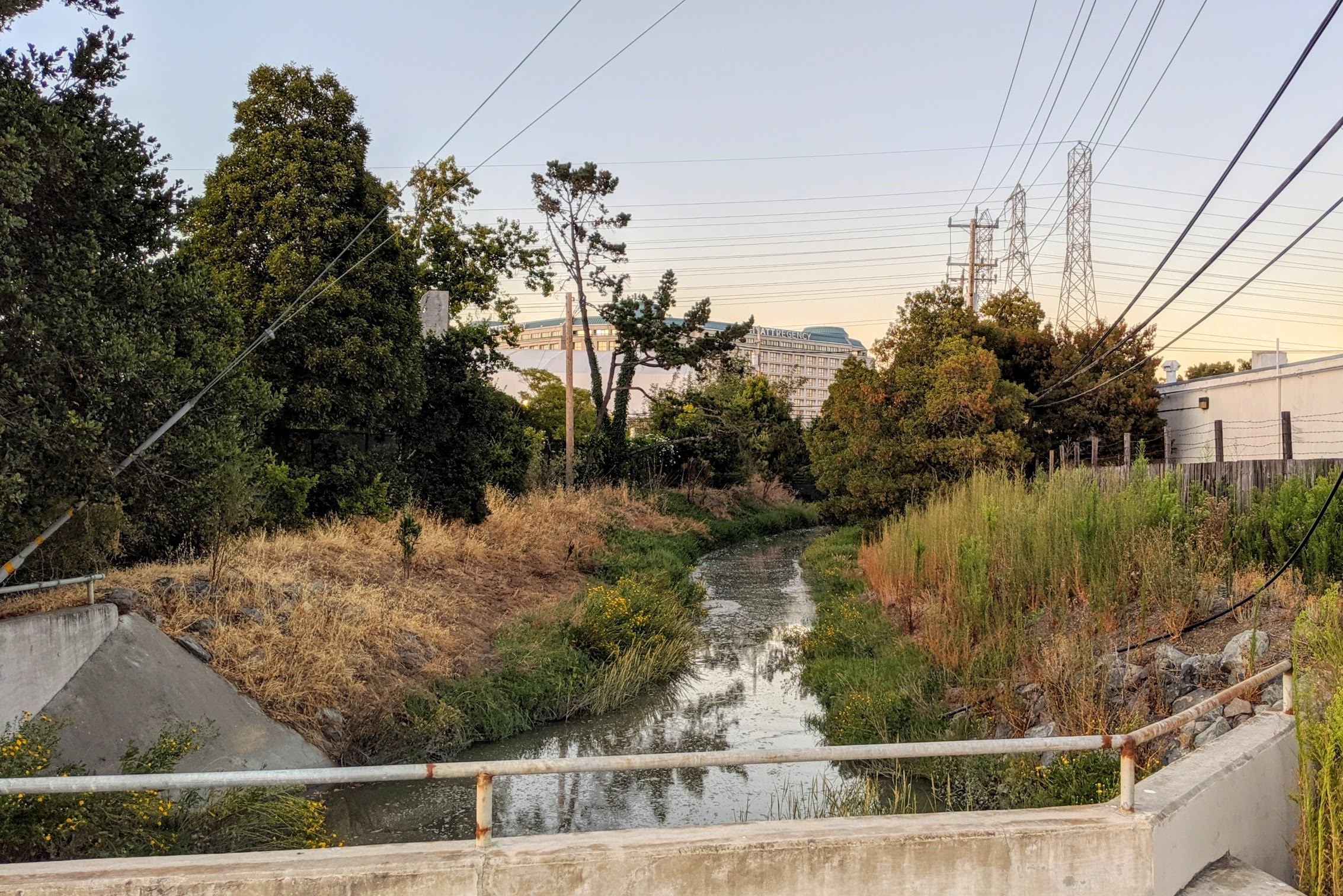
- Easton Creek channel as it approaches the bay

- Location of the mouth of Easton Creek in California

Location
- Country: United States
- State: California
- Region: San Mateo County
- City: Burlingame

Physical characteristics
- Source
  - location: San Mateo County, California
- Mouth
  - elevation: 29 ft (8.8 m)

Easton Creek is a short eastward-flowing stream whose watershed originates in Burlingame's foothills in San Mateo County, California, United States. The creek runs south of the Mills Creek and north of the Sanchez Creek watercourses.

The creek is predominantly underground, with storm drains through the hills and residential flatlands of Burlingame, roughly following Canyon Road and Easton Drive. Starting at the Caltrain tracks, towards the former marshlands adjacent to the San Francisco Bay, it is culverted or channelized into the bay.

== Watercourse gallery ==
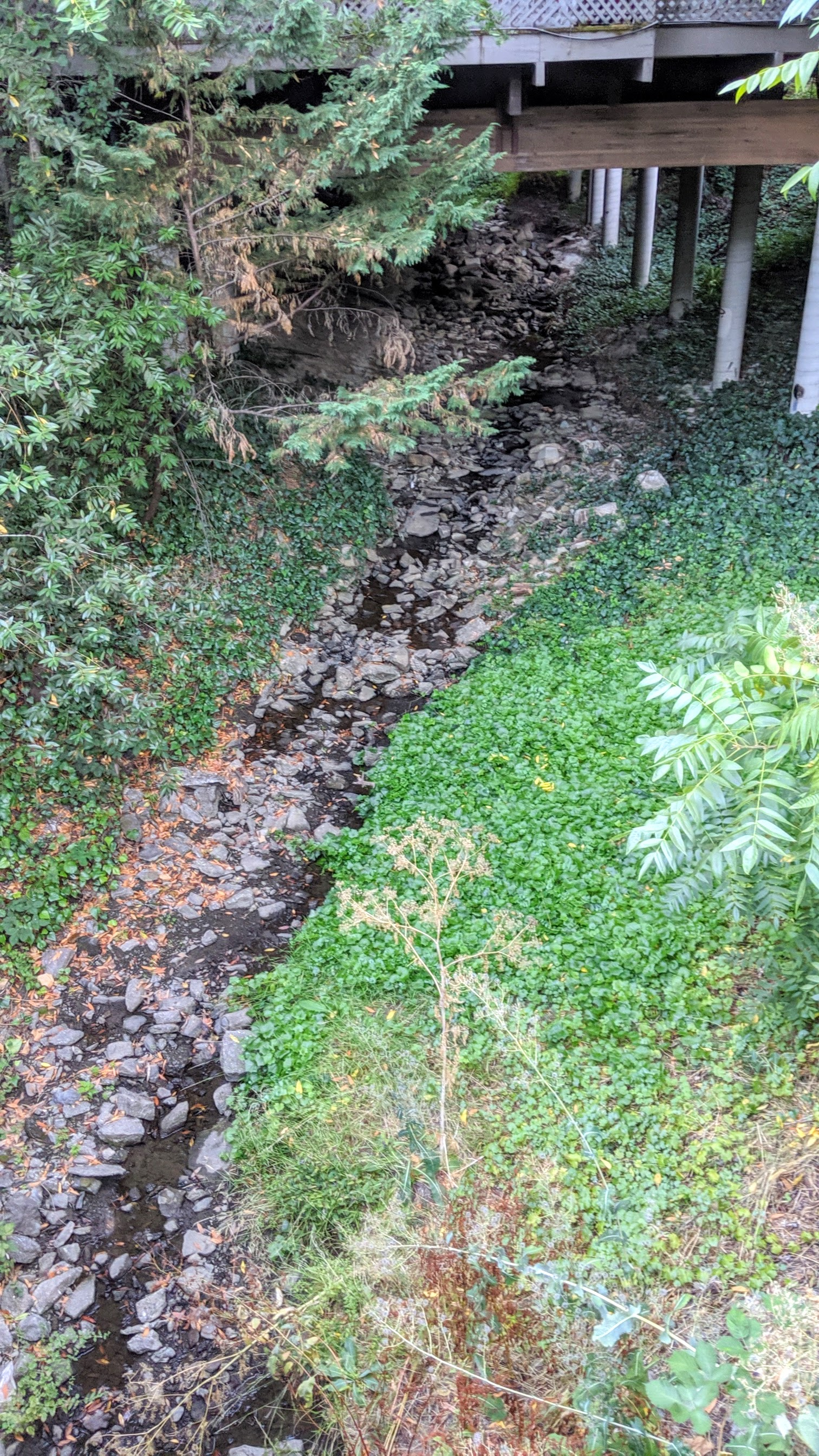
Along Canyon Road

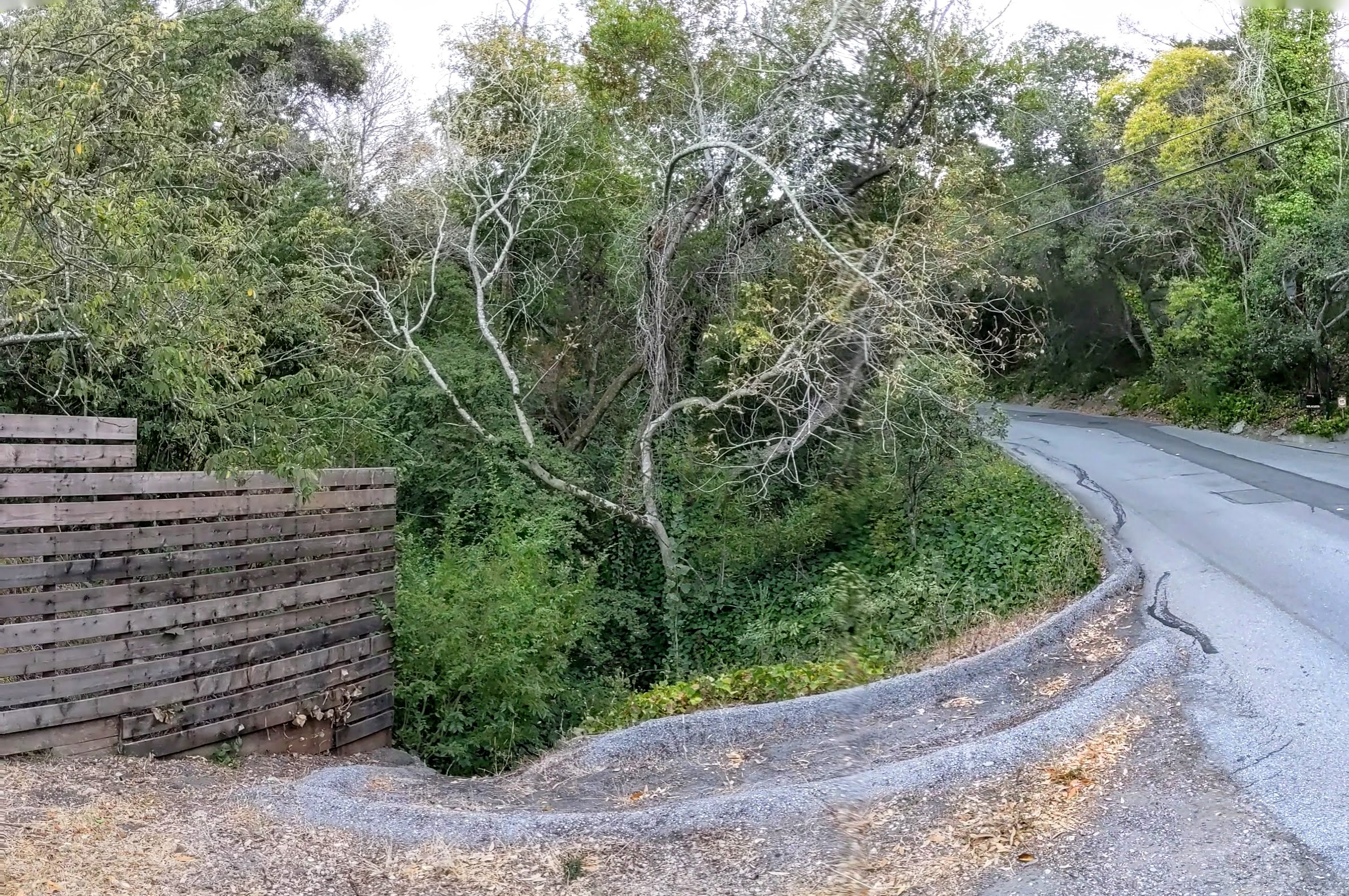
Crossing under Canyon Road

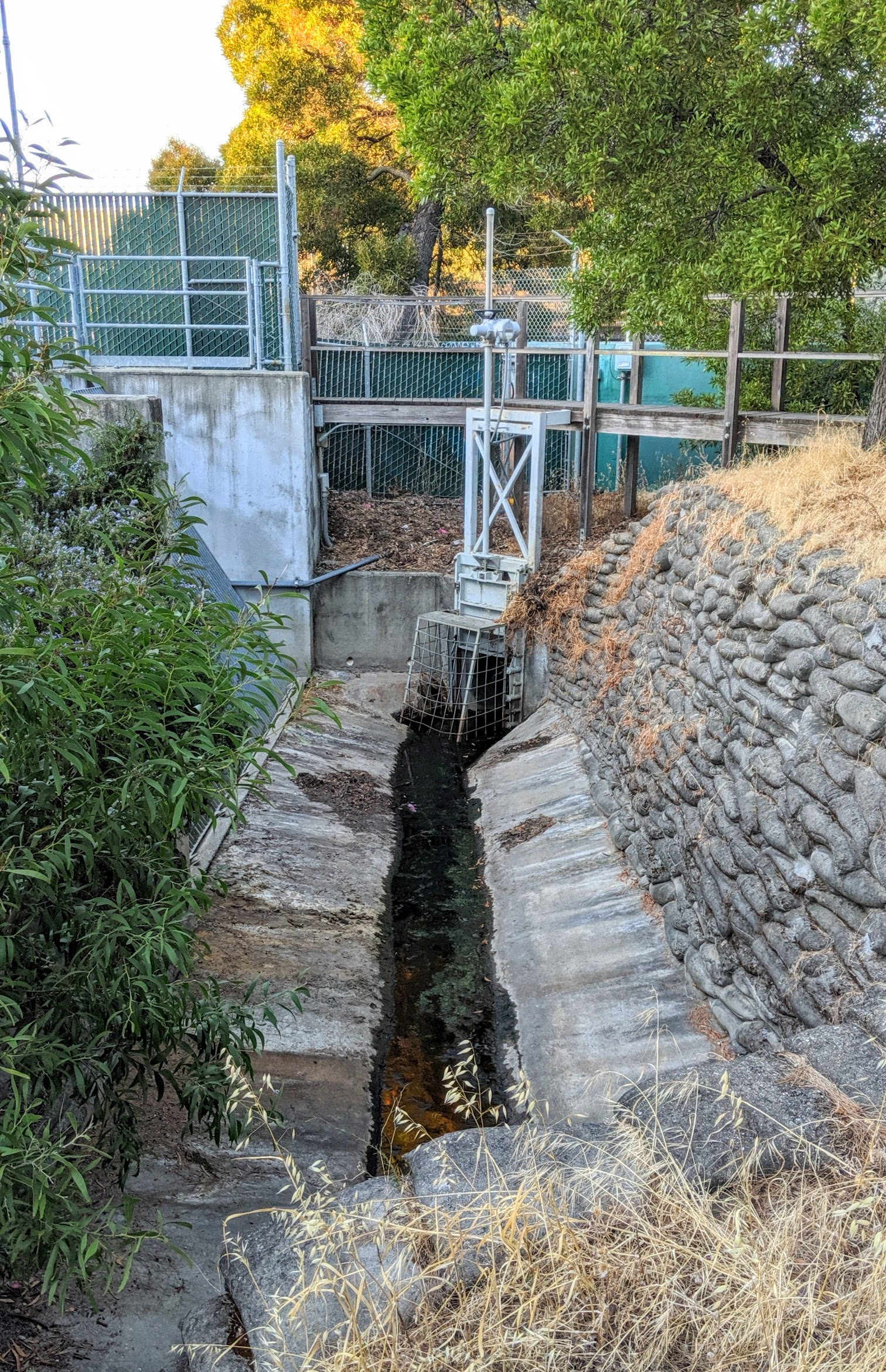
At the California–Grove Storm Station

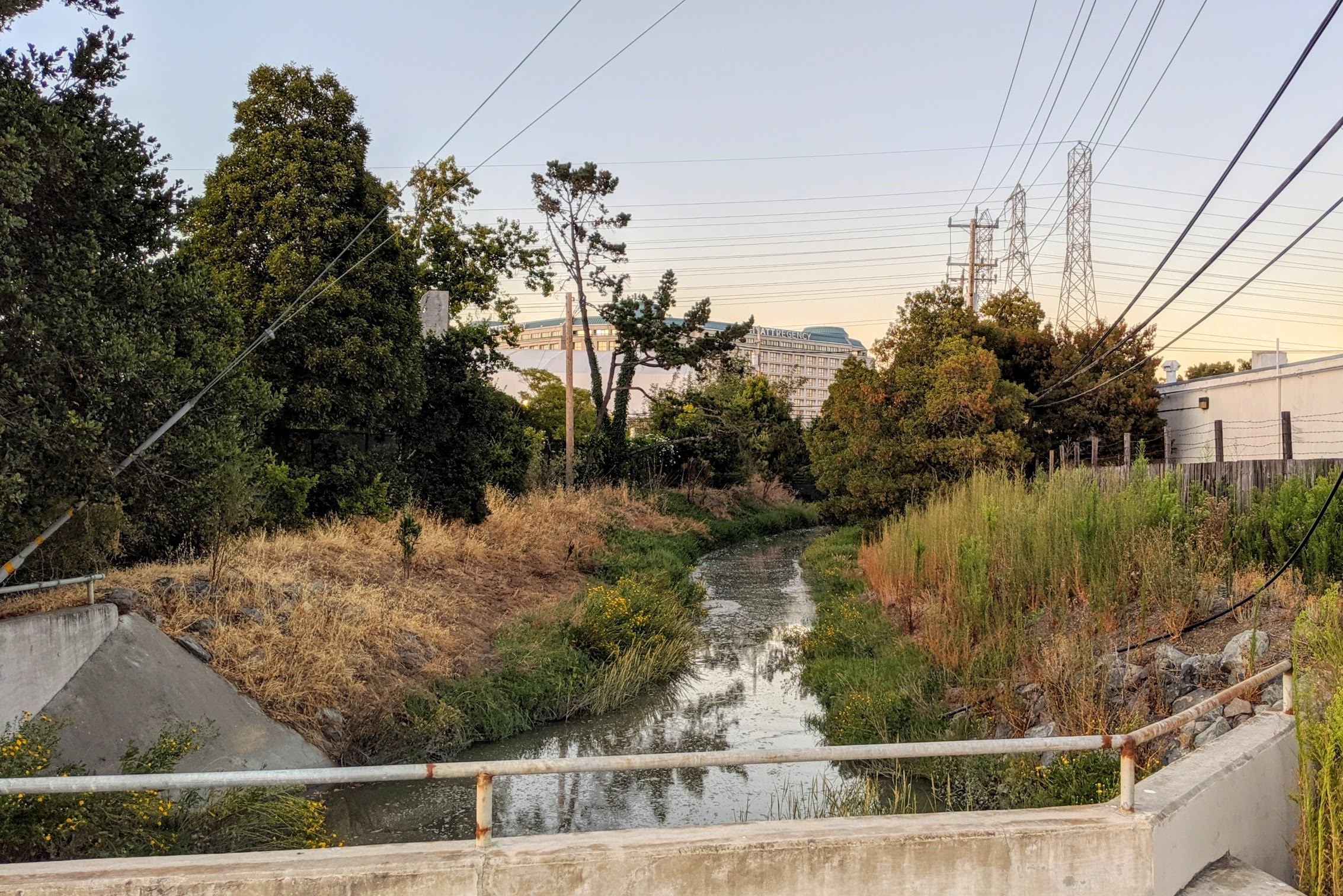
At Rollins Road, approaching the bay

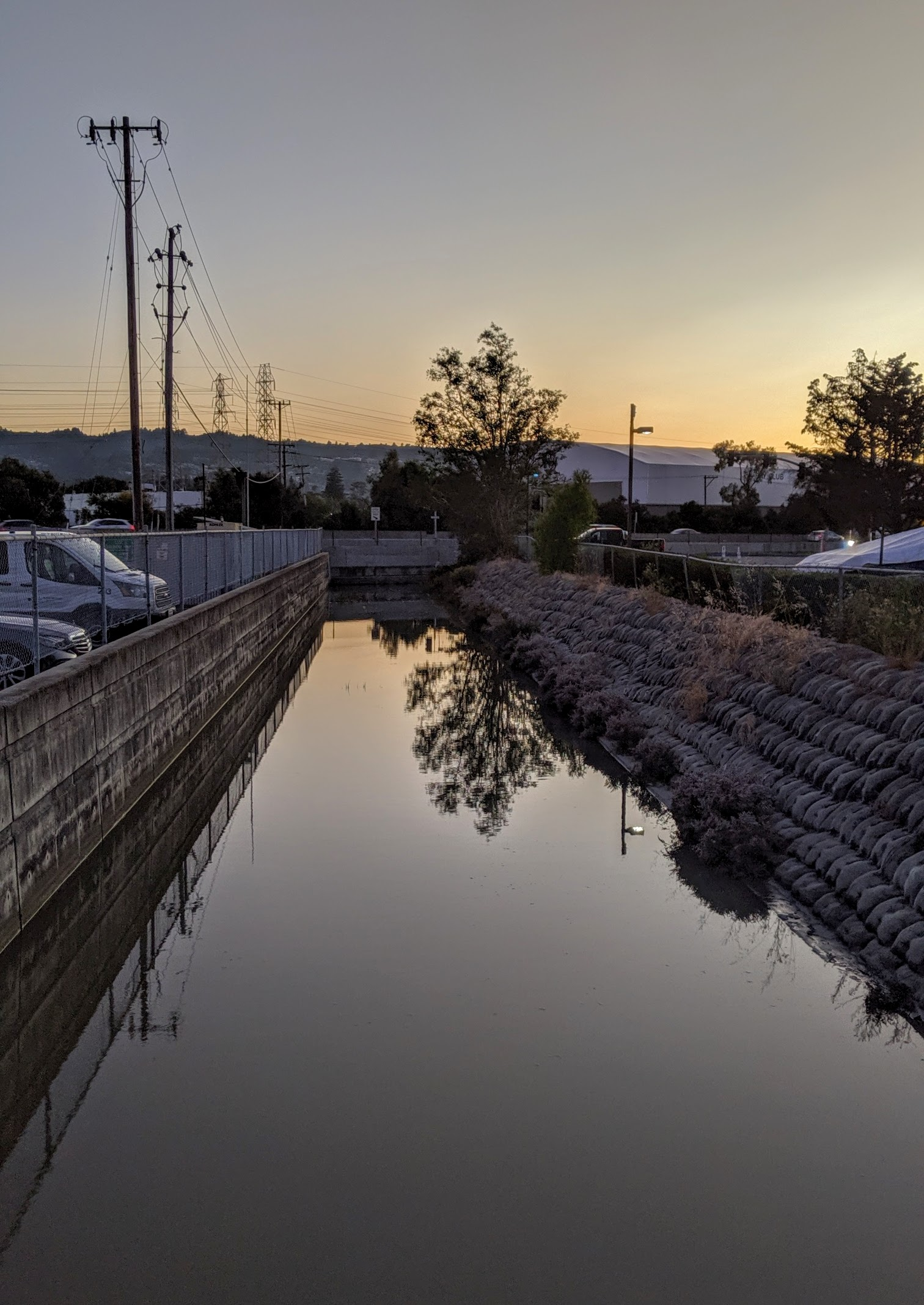
Looking upstream from Old Bayshore Highway

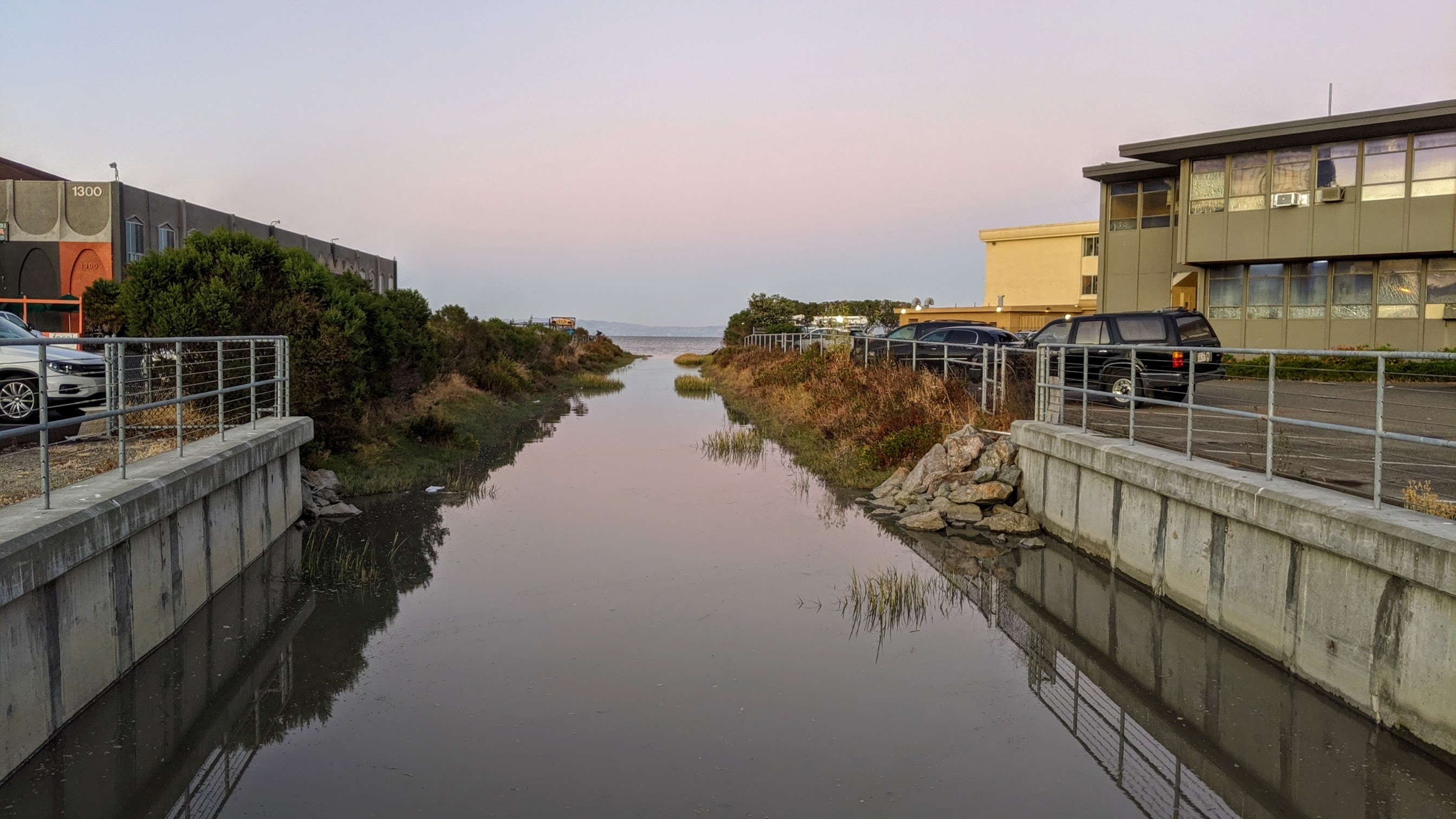
Slough entering the bay

== See also ==
- List of watercourses in the San Francisco Bay Area
