= Mill Creek Bridge =

Mill Creek Bridge may refer to:

- Bridge in City of Wilkes-Barre, documented by the Historic American Engineering Record as "Mill Creek Bridge"
- Mill Creek Covered Bridge, near Rockville, Indiana
- Mill Creek Bridge (Cherokee, Iowa)
- Mill Creek Bridge (Clarence, Iowa)
- Mill Creek Park Suspension Bridge, Youngstown, Ohio
- Mill Creek Bridge (The Dalles, Oregon), on the Historic Columbia River Highway
