= Mill Brook =

Mill Brook may refer to:

== United Kingdom ==
- Mill Brook, Shropshire, a tributary of the River Rea, Shropshire in England

== United States ==
- Mill Brook (Swift River tributary), a tributary of the Swift River in New Hampshire
- First River, formerly known as Mill Brook, a tributary of the Passaic River in New Jersey
- Mill Brook (Pepacton Reservoir tributary), a river in Delaware and Ulster Counties, New York
- Mill Brook (Unadilla River tributary), a river in Chenango County, New York
- Mill Brook (West Canada Creek tributary), a river in Herkimer County, New York
- Mill Brook community, historic community in Vermont

== See also ==
- Mill Creek (disambiguation)
- Millbrook (disambiguation)
