= Mill Creek (Morgan County, Missouri) =

Stream in the U.S. state of Missouri

Mill Creek is a stream in Morgan County in the U.S. state of Missouri. It is a tributary to the Gravois Creek arm of the Lake of the Ozarks.

The stream headwaters arise at 38°14′23″N 92°53′10″W just northeast of Missouri Route 135 at an elevation of approximately 920 ft (280 m). The stream meanders northeast and east passing under Missouri Route 5 and enters the Lake of the Ozarks at 38°14′37″N 92°48′02″W at an elevation of 663 ft (202 m). Previous to the impoundment of the lake the confluence of Mill Creek with Gravois Creek was located 2.3 miles to the northeast at 38°15′32″N 92°45′15″W and an elevation of 620 ft (190 m) and about one mile north of the community of Gladstone.

Mill Creek was so named on account of watermills near its course.

== See also ==
- List of rivers of Missouri
