= Collins Creek (Idaho) =

Stream in Idaho, U.S.

Coordinates: 46°51′46″N 115°26′09″W

Collins Creek is a stream in the U.S. state of Idaho.

Collins Creek was named after Private John Collins of the Lewis and Clark Expedition.
