= Mill Creek (Lackawanna River tributary) =

Mill Creek Little Mill Creek

Physical characteristics
- Source
  - location: valley near Dark Hollow in Pittston Township, Pennsylvania
  - elevation: between 1,200 and 1,220 feet (370 and 370 m)
- Mouth
  - location: Lackawanna River in Moosic, Lackawanna County, Pennsylvania
  - coordinates: 41°21′22″N 75°44′32″W
  - elevation: 604 ft (184 m)
- Length: 5.5 mi (8.9 km)
- Basin size: 10.6 mi^{2} (27 km^{2})

Basin features
- Progression: Lackawanna River → Susquehanna River → Chesapeake Bay
- Tributaries
  - right: Collins Creek, Lidy Creek

Mill Creek (also known as Little Mill Creek) is a tributary of the Lackawanna River in Luzerne County and Lackawanna County, in Pennsylvania, in the United States. It is approximately 5.5 miles (8.9 km) long and flows through Pittston Township, Dupont, Avoca, and Duryea in Luzerne County and Moosic in Lackawanna County. The watershed of the creek has an area of 10.6 square miles (27 km^{2}). It is designated as a Coldwater Fishery and a Migratory Fishery. The creek has two named tributaries: Collins Creek and Lidy Creek. The surficial geology in its vicinity includes urban land, coal dumps, surface mining land, Wisconsinan Ice-Contact Stratified Drift, Wisconsinan Till, and bedrock.

== Course ==
Mill Creek begins in a valley near Dark Hollow in Pittston Township, Luzerne County. It flows west for several tenths of a mile before turning north for several tenths of a mile and leaving the valley. The creek then turns west-southwest for a few tenths of a mile before turning north. It receives Collins Creek, its first named tributary, from the right and continues flowing north for more than a mile. It crosses Interstate 476 and Interstate 81 before entering Dupont, where it crosses Pennsylvania Route 315. The creek eventually turns north-northeast and receives Lidy Creek, its last named tributary, from the right. It then turns north again and enters Avoca, where it turns north-northwest for a few tenths of a mile. It then turns northeast for a few tenths of a mile before turning northwest and then northeast again. The creek then turns north, passes through Duryea, and exits Luzerne County.

Upon exiting Luzerne County, Mill Creek enters Moosic, Lackawanna County. It flows north for several tenths of a mile before reaching its confluence with the Lackawanna River.

Mill Creek joins the Lackawanna River 3.30 miles (5.31 km) upriver of its mouth.

=== Tributaries ===
Mill Creek has two named tributaries: Lidy Creek and Collins Creek, both of which are "high quality" watersheds. Lidy Creek joins Mill Creek 2.46 miles (3.96 km) upstream of its mouth. Its watershed has an area of 1.50 square miles (3.9 km^{2}). Collins Creek joins Mill Creek 3.66 miles (5.89 km) upstream of its mouth. Its watershed has an area of 1.39 square miles (3.6 km^{2}). Mill Creek also has one unnamed tributary known as "Unnamed trib 1". This tributary is 1.0 mile (1.6 km) long.

== Hydrology ==
In 2001, Mill Creek was noted to have total flow loss. The creek begins to lose its flow near O'Hara Road. It is also affected by urban stormwater in this reach. The tributaries Lidy Creek and Collins Creek also lose flow to mine pools.

== Geography and geology ==
The elevation near the mouth of Mill Creek is 604 feet (184 m) above sea level. The elevation of the creek's source is between 1,200 and 1,220 feet (370 and 370 m) above sea level.

The floodplain of Mill Creek has extensive deposits of culm and silt left over from former mining operations.

The upper reaches of Mill Creek are in the vicinity of Suscon Mountain, a mountain in the Moosic Mountain range. The creek also flows through a steep ravine alongside Sucson Road. There are several cliff faces, splash pools, and waterfalls in this ravine.

Mill Creek passes through the Llewellyn coal formation at an elevation of approximately 1,200 feet (370 m) above sea level. There is no evidence of strip mining in the creek's upper reaches. However, there is evidence of it downstream of Interstate 81. The surficial geology in the vicinity of the creek mainly consists of urban land. However, coal dumps, surface mining land, Wisconsinan Ice-Contact Stratified Drift, and bedrock are also present. Further upstream, the surficial geology consists of Wisconsinan Till and bedrock, as well as other things.

== Watershed ==
The watershed of Mill Creek has an area of 10.6 square miles (27 km^{2}). The watershed is in the southwestern part of the Lackawanna River watershed. It occupies portions of Moosic, Avoca, Dupont, Duryea, Hugestown, Pittson Township, and Jenkins Township. The creek is entirely within the United States Geological Survey quadrangle of Avoca.

There are two small dams on Mill Creek. Both have been breached and converted to wetlands.

== History ==
Mill Creek was entered into the Geographic Names Information System on August 2, 1979. Its identifier in the Geographic Names Information System is 1181131. The creek is also known as Little Mill Creek. This name appears in Patton's Philadelphia and Suburbs Street and Road Map, which was published in 1984.

The Erie Railroad historically passed through the watershed of Mill Creek. The abandoned railroad grade still remains.

Channelization work was done on 1 mile (1.6 km) of Mill Creek in Dupont in 1938 by the Works Progress Administration. In 1958, the United States Bureau of Mines channelized 0.5 miles (0.80 km) of the creek in Dupont. In 2000, the Pennsylvania Department of Environmental Protection channelized 0.5 miles (0.80 km) of the creek in Avoca.

In 2001, the Lackawanna River Watershed Conservation Plan recommended cleaning up coal waste sediments along Mill Creek.

== Biology ==
The drainage basin of Mill Creek is designated as a Coldwater Fishery and a Migratory Fishery.

Mill Creek has a riparian buffer in its floodplain. In the ravine that the creek flows through, there is a hemlock canopy and an understory consisting of rhododendron. The creek also passes through a mixed oak forest with an area of at least 1,200 acres (490 ha).

== See also ==
- Saint Johns Creek (Pennsylvania), next tributary of the Lackawanna River going downriver
- Spring Brook (Lackawanna River), next tributary of the Lackawanna River going upriver
- List of rivers of Pennsylvania
- List of tributaries of the Lackawanna River
