= Millbrook High School =

Millbrook High School can refer to:

- Millbrook High School (New York), a public high school in Millbrook, New York
- Millbrook High School (North Carolina), Raleigh, North Carolina
- Millbrook High School (Virginia), Winchester, Virginia

== See also ==
- Millbrook Community School, a secondary school, Southampton, England
- Millbrook School, a private, coeducational secondary school, Millbrook, New York
