= Mill River Historic District =

Historic district in Massachusetts, United States

- U.S. National Register of Historic Places
- U.S. Historic district
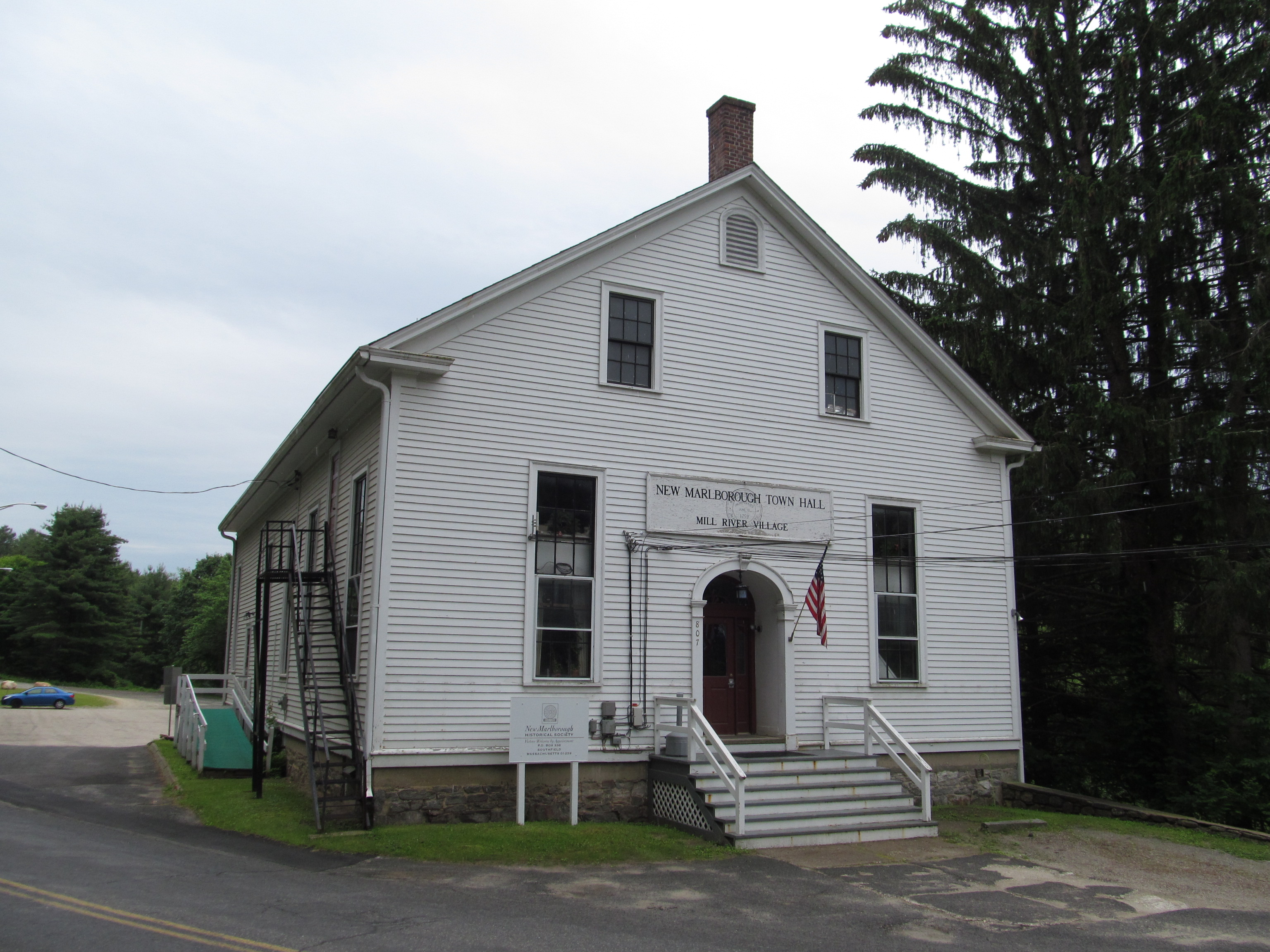
- New Marlborough Town Hall

- Location within Massachusetts Location within the United States
- Location: Mill River, Massachusetts
- Coordinates: 42°6′49″N 73°16′6″W
- Built: 1742
- Architectural style: Federal, Greek Revival, Gothic Revival
- NRHP reference No.: 94000423
- Added to NRHP: May 17, 1994

Mill River Historic District is a historic district encompassing the traditional center of government and a former industrial mill village along the Konkapot River in the village of Mill River in New Marlborough, Massachusetts. The district is roughly bounded by Main Street and River Church, Southfield, Clayton, School, and Hayes Hill Roads. It encompasses about 425 acres (172 ha), and contains mostly 19th century residential and civic buildings, as well as remnants of 19th century industrial activity.

The principal defining feature of the district is its narrow setting along the Konkapot River. The significant drop of the river in the area (129 feet (39 m) over a 1.5 miles (2.4 km) stretch of the river) prompted the construction of many dams and mills, of which remnants of eight survive. The housing stock in the village was built mainly in the first half of the 19th century, during the height of industrial activity, and features simple two story wood frame housing, usually with Greek Revival styling. Some houses predate the industrial period, and a number of houses were built later in the 19th century. The village declined in importance as an industrial center after the railroad was built through town, but not near the village, and most of its industrial infrastructure was eventually abandoned.

The civic buildings in the district include two Romanesque churches built in the 1860s, as well as the town hall, library, and school. A few commercial buildings from the era have also survived, including the current general store. The district was listed on the National Register of Historic Places in 1994.

== See also ==
- National Register of Historic Places listings in Berkshire County, Massachusetts
