= Millcreek Township =

Millcreek Township or Mill Creek Township may refer to:

== Arkansas ==
- Mill Creek Township, Ashley County, Arkansas, in Ashley County, Arkansas
- Mill Creek Township, Franklin County, Arkansas, in Franklin County, Arkansas
- Mill Creek Township, Izard County, Arkansas, in Izard County, Arkansas
- Mill Creek Township, Lincoln County, Arkansas, in Lincoln County, Arkansas
- Mill Creek Township, Madison County, Arkansas
- Mill Creek Township, Polk County, Arkansas, in Polk County, Arkansas
- Mill Creek Township, Scott County, Arkansas, in Scott County, Arkansas
- Mill Creek Township, Sevier County, Arkansas, in Sevier County, Arkansas

== Indiana ==
- Millcreek Township, Fountain County, Indiana

== Kansas ==
- Mill Creek Township, Bourbon County, Kansas
- Mill Creek Township, Pottawatomie County, Kansas, in Pottawatomie County, Kansas
- Mill Creek Township, Wabaunsee County, Kansas, in Wabaunsee County, Kansas
- Mill Creek Township, Washington County, Kansas, in Washington County, Kansas

== Missouri ==
- Mill Creek Township, Morgan County, Missouri

== Ohio ==
- Mill Creek Township, Coshocton County, Ohio
- Mill Creek Township, Hamilton County, Ohio
- Mill Creek Township, Union County, Ohio
- Mill Creek Township, Williams County, Ohio

== Pennsylvania ==
- Mill Creek Township, Lycoming County, Pennsylvania
- Mill Creek Township, Mercer County, Pennsylvania
- Millcreek Township, Clarion County, Pennsylvania
- Millcreek Township, Erie County, Pennsylvania
- Millcreek Township, Lebanon County, Pennsylvania

== Utah ==
- Millcreek Township, Utah
