= Mill Creek (Muckalee Creek tributary) =

Stream in Georgia, U.S.

Coordinates: 32°2′4.59″N 84°13′55.67″W

Mill Creek is a stream in the U.S. state of Georgia. It is a tributary to Muckalee Creek.

Mill Creek was so named for a watermill on its course.
