= Mills Creek (San Mateo County) =

- Location within San Francisco Bay Area Location within California Location within the United States

Location
- Country: United States
- State: California
- Region: San Mateo County
- City: Burlingame

Physical characteristics
- Source
  - location: San Mateo County, California
- Mouth
  - location: Burlingame, California
  - coordinates: 37°35′50″N 122°21′57″W
  - elevation: 29 ft (8.8 m)

Mills Creek is a short eastward-flowing stream whose watershed originates in and around Mills Canyon Park in Burlingame's foothills in San Mateo County, California, United States. The creek runs south of Millbrae Creek and north of Easton Creek watercourses respectively.

The creek is in a mostly natural channel through the hills and residential flatlands of Burlingame. Starting near the Caltrain tracks, it is partially culverted and channelized into the San Francisco Bay.

== Watercourse gallery ==
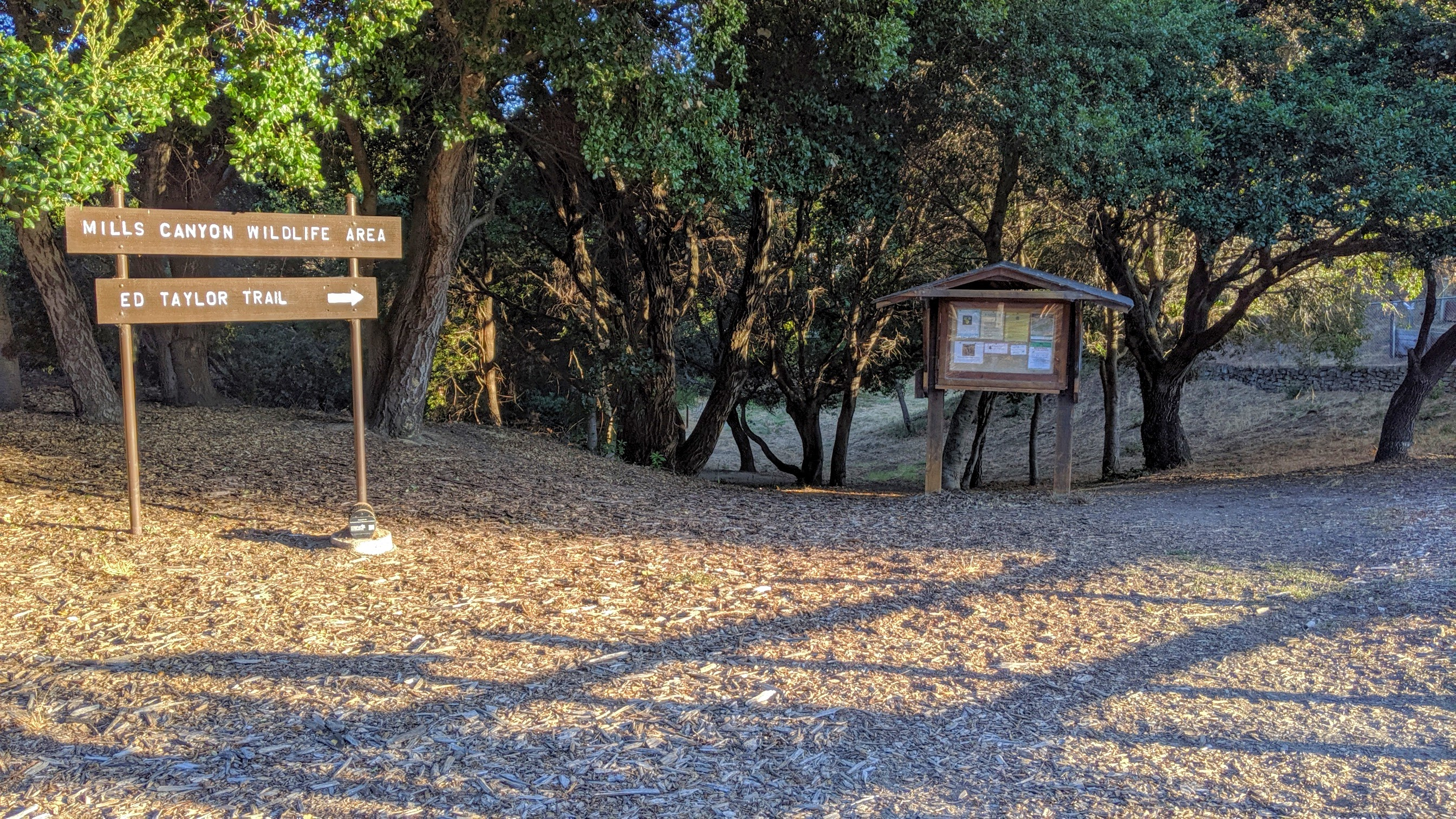
Mills Canyon Wildlife Area headwaters region

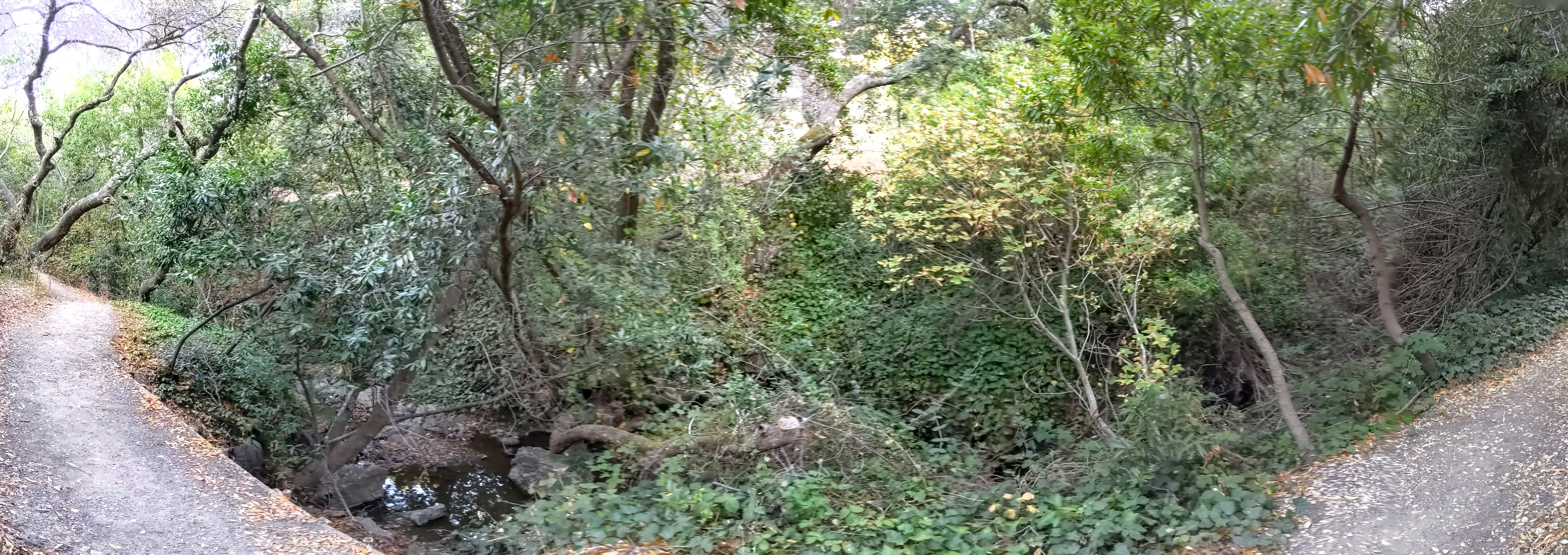
In Mills Canyon

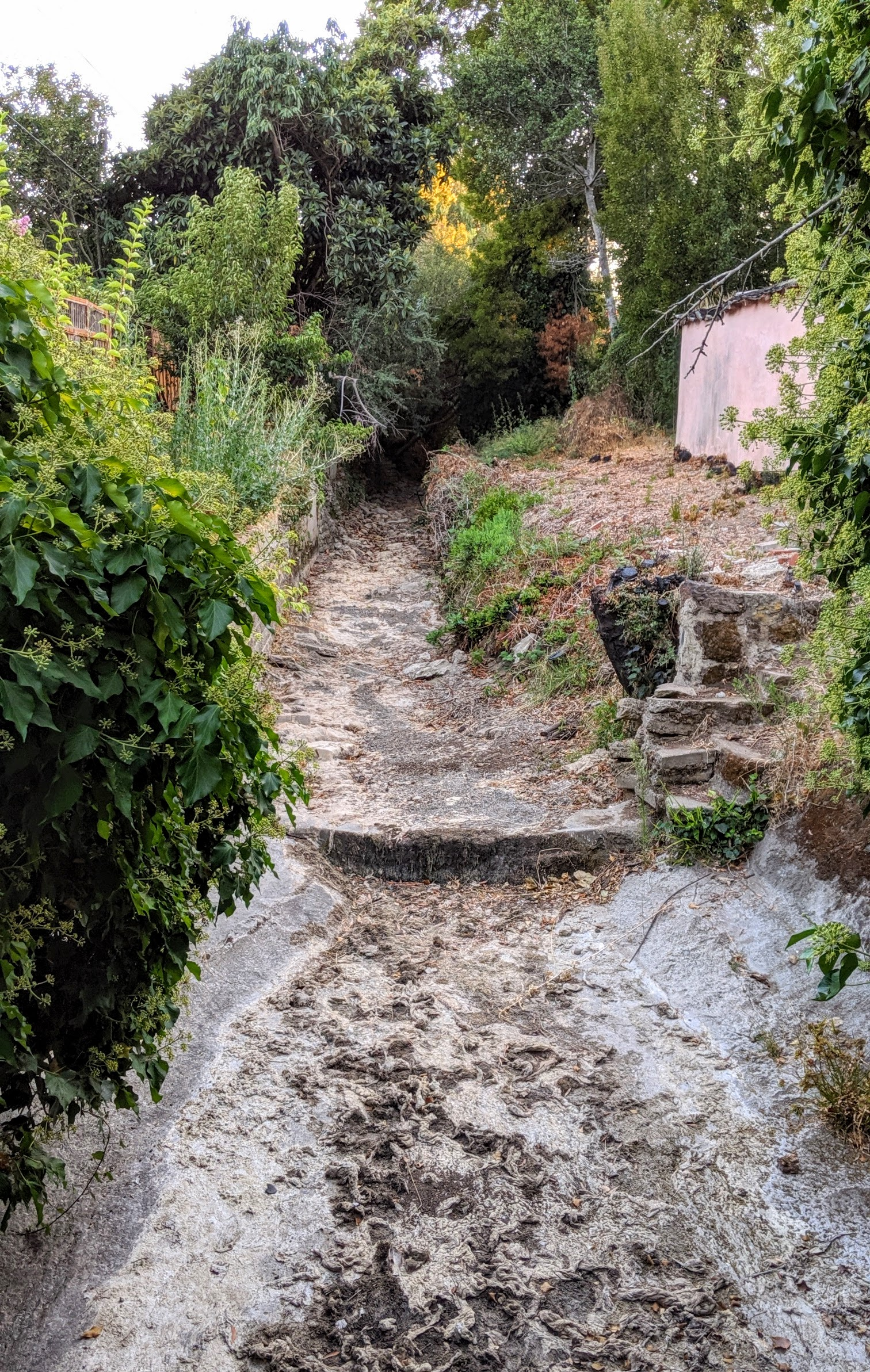
upstream of railroad tracks

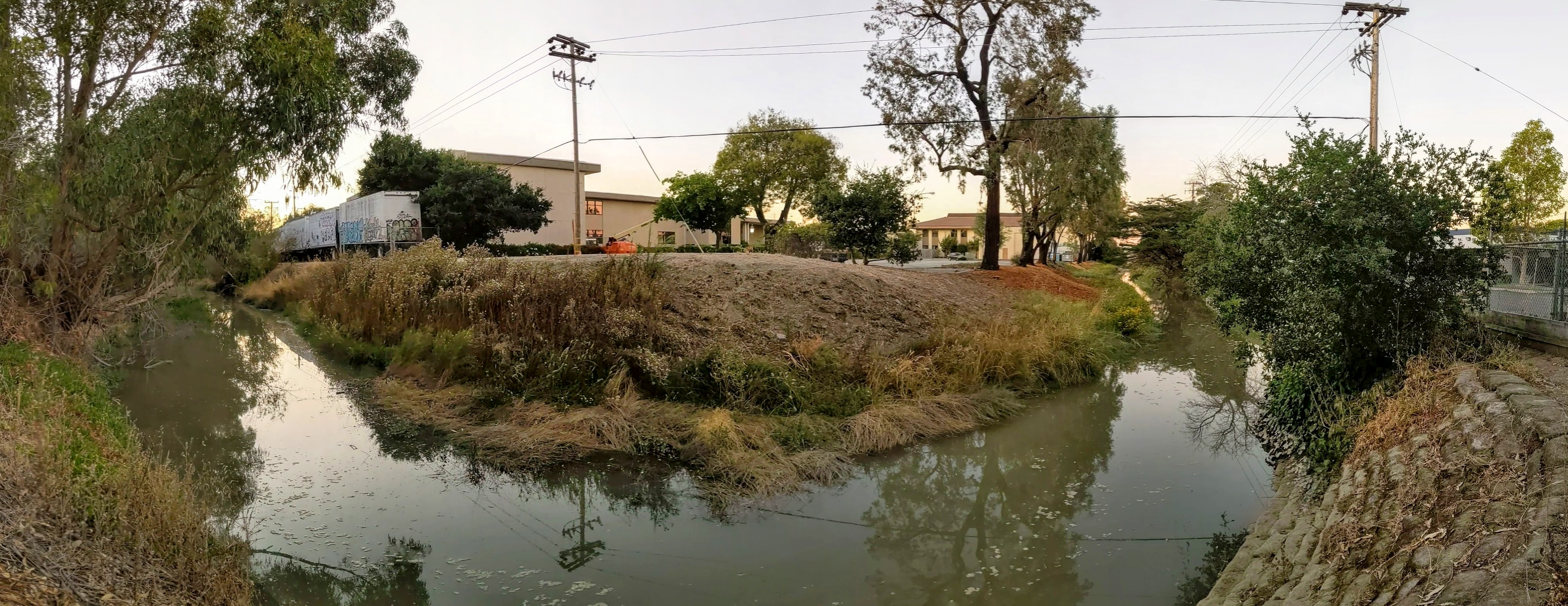
Pano along railroad tracks (left) and Rollins Road (right)

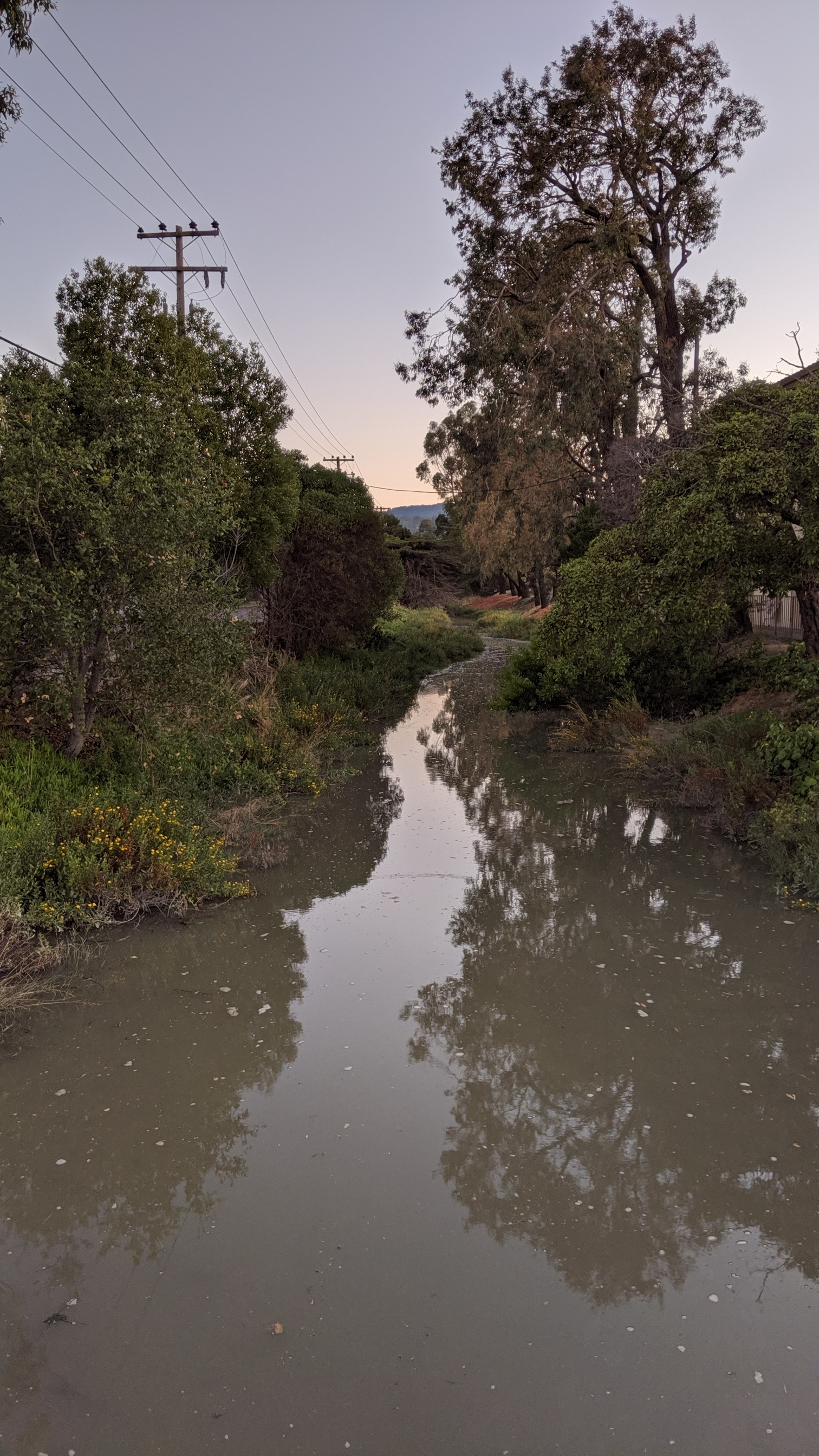
At Rollins Road

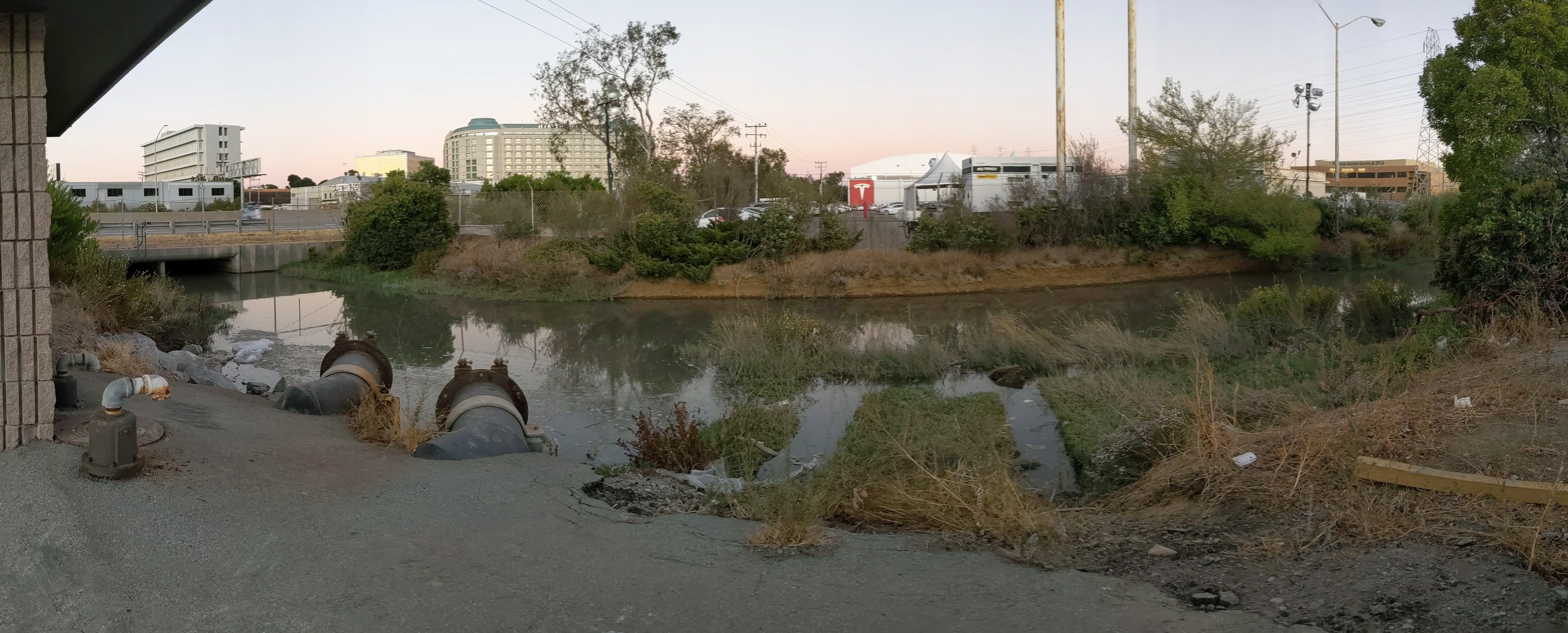
Behind the Adrian Storm Station

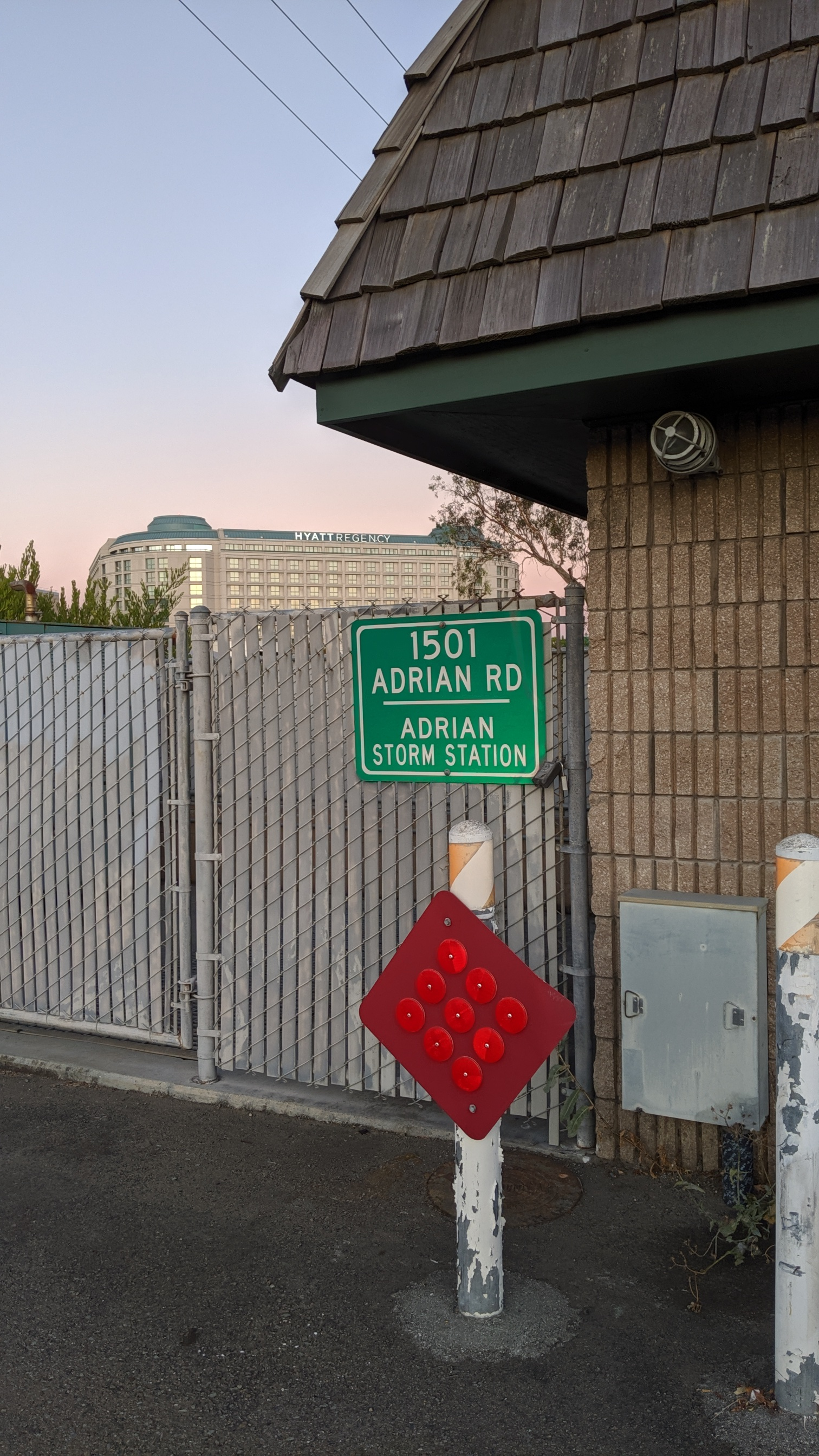
Adrian Storm Station

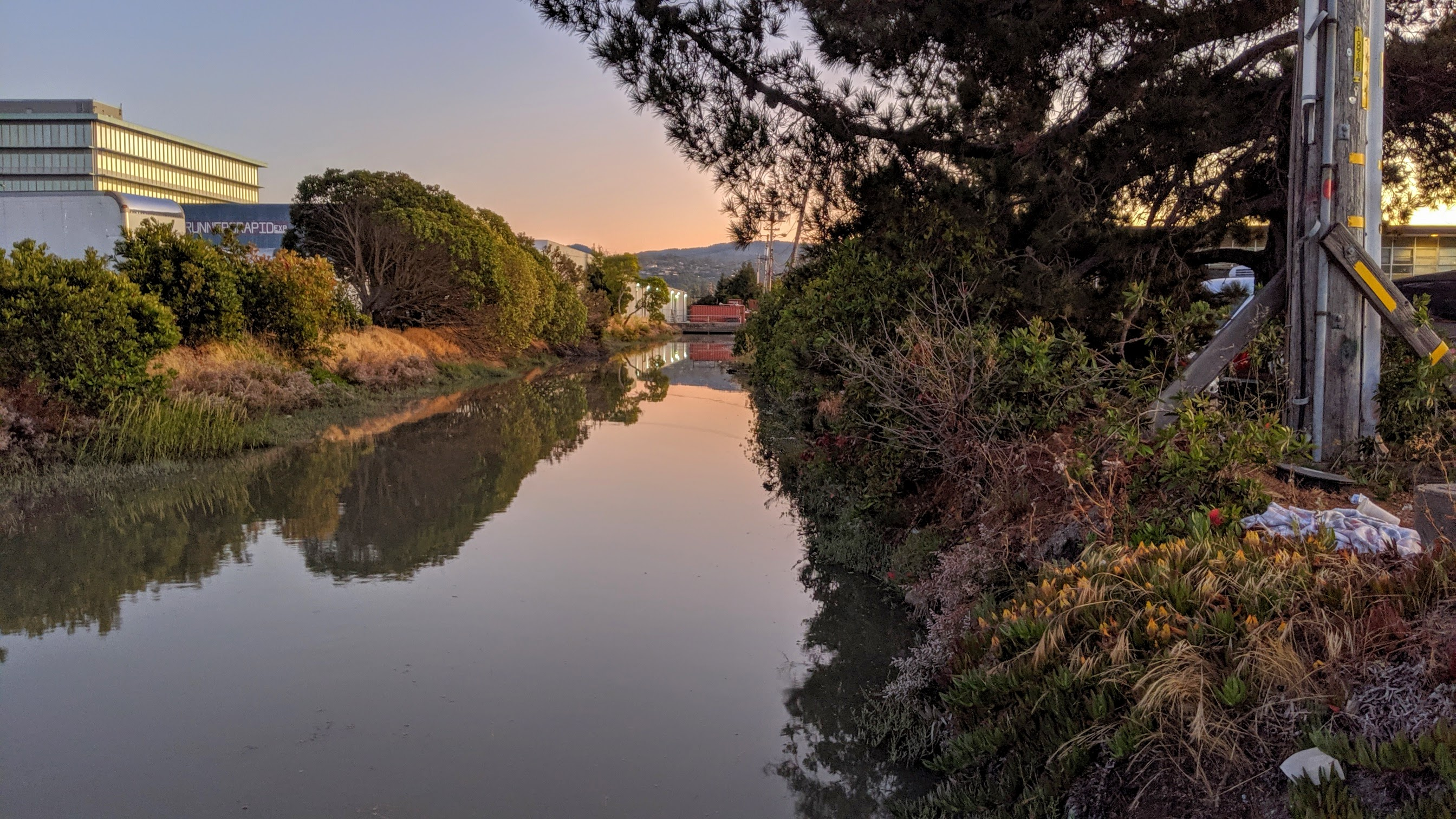
Upstream from Old Bayshore Highway

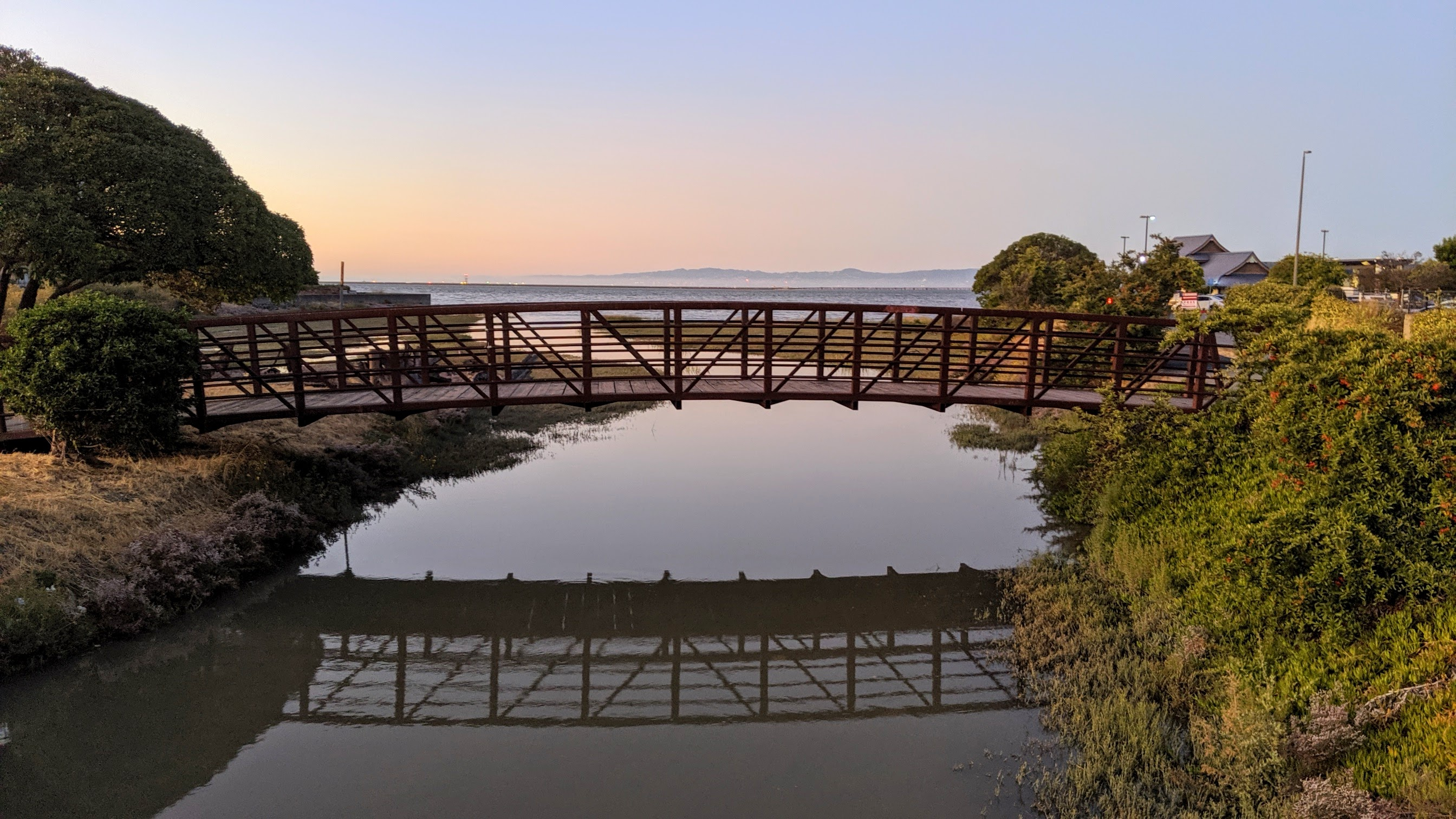
Slough entering the Bay

== See also ==
- List of watercourses in the San Francisco Bay Area
