= Mill Creek (Etowah River tributary) =

Stream in Georgia, U.S.

Coordinates: 34°21′59.34″N 84°6′1.69″W

Mill Creek is a stream in the U.S. state of Georgia. It is a tributary to the Etowah River.

Mill Creek was so named for a watermill on its course.
