= Mill Creek (Loutre River tributary) =

Stream in the American state of Missouri

Coordinates: 38.807543°N 91.483775°W

Mill Creek is a stream in Montgomery County in the U.S. state of Missouri.

Mill Creek (also called "Mill Branch") was named for a watermill near its course.

== See also ==
- List of rivers of Missouri
