= Mill Creek (Johnson County, Iowa) =

Stream in Johnson County, Iowa, U.S.

Coordinates: 41.809734°N 91.515728°W

Mill Creek is a stream in Johnson County, Iowa, in the United States. Mill Creek was named from the presence of a saw mill built in 1839.

== See also ==
- List of rivers of Iowa
