= Mill Creek (Susquehanna River tributary, Otego) =

- Location of the mouth of Mill Creek

Location
- Country: United States
- State: New York
- County: Otsego

Physical characteristics
- Source
  - coordinates: 42°28′39″N 75°09′29″W
- Mouth: Susquehanna River
  - coordinates: 42°25′07″N 75°08′16″W
  - elevation: 1,047 ft (319 m)

Mill Creek is a river in Otsego County, New York. It converges with the Susquehanna River in the town of Otego, southwest of Oneonta.
