= Volney Rogers =

American lawyer (1846–1919)

- Born: December 1, 1846; East Palestine, Ohio
- Died: December 3, 1919 (aged 73); Cañon City, Colorado
- Known for: Mill Creek Park

Volney Rogers (December 1, 1846 – December 3, 1919) was a lawyer in Youngstown, Ohio, United States, who is known for his role in transforming Mill Creek "hollow" into one of the nation's most celebrated metropolitan parks. Rogers, a seminal figure in the history of America's state park system, served as counsel for the American Civic Association, a group dedicated to the preservation of Niagara Falls.

== Early life ==
Rogers was born and raised in the farming community of East Palestine, in Columbiana County. After finishing school, he taught for one term and then studied telegraphy. Rogers took a position as an operator in Brownsville, Pennsylvania, and later served on a construction crew that strung a wire along the old National Pike from Pittsburgh to Baltimore. While employed as a telegrapher for the Pennsylvania legislature in Harrisburg, Rogers decided to study law. He was admitted to the bar in 1871, and formed a partnership with his brother, Disney Rogers. The business partners set up an office in downtown Youngstown.

== Birth of Mill Creek Park ==
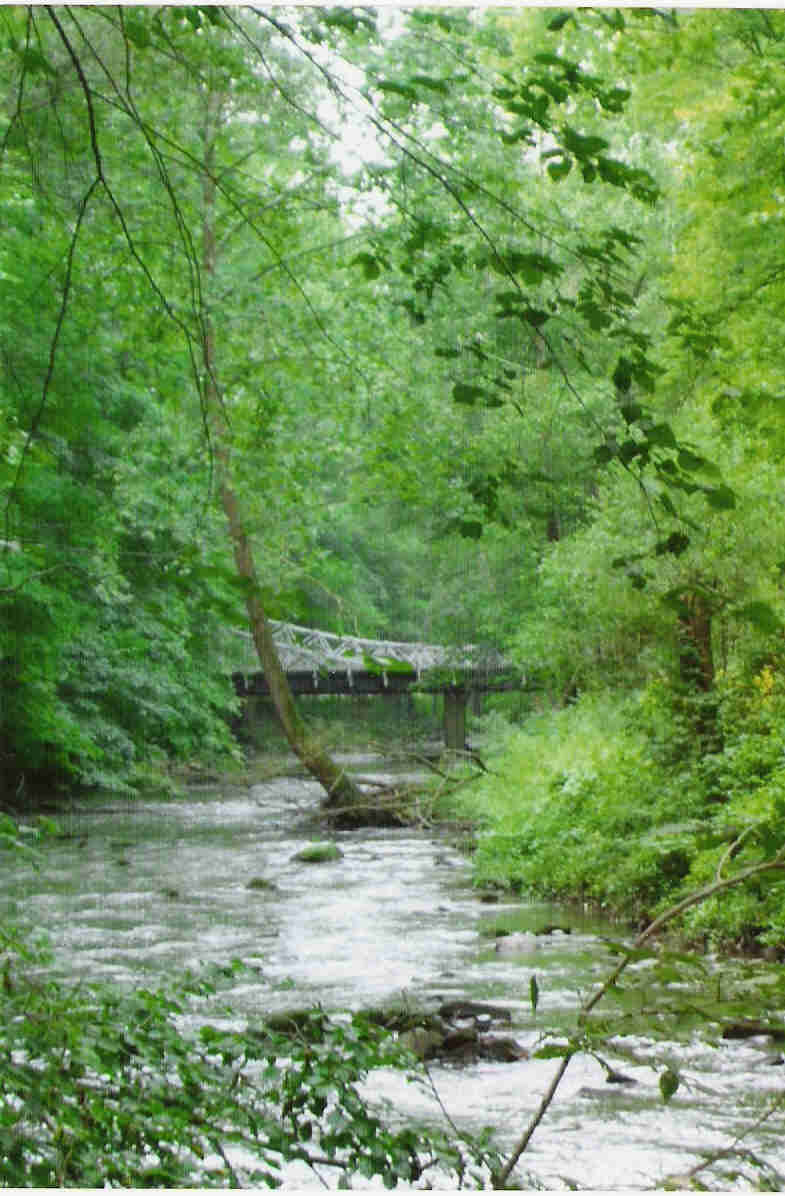
Mill Creek Park

An avid horseback rider, Rogers encountered Mill Creek Gorge during a jaunt through Youngstown Township in 1890. He was so impressed with its natural beauty that he took steps to preserve the gorge, which was then becoming a locus of timber production and the site of numerous stone quarries. An account published after Rogers' death describes the scene as follows: "Already, the sound of sawmill buzz saws could be heard in the distance, and Volney Rogers resolved to secure Mill Creek for a park for Youngstown for then, for now, and for the evercoming future".

Rogers secured options on much of the land and was able to purchase large tracts of it. This was no small task given that he was compelled to deal with more than 90 landowners. Once the land was secured, Rogers framed and promoted what he called the "Township Park Improvement Law". Upon the law's passage, Rogers turned over all of the land he had secured for park purposes. Rogers enlisted the help of his brother Bruce, who had studied landscape architecture; and Bruce Rogers became the first Mill Creek Park superintendent. The project also benefited from the contributions of well-known landscape architect Charles Eliot, and the park is considered one of his notable works.

The Mahoning County commissioners issued bonds to pay for the parkland, and Rogers purchased $25,000 of them, with the understanding that they would be the last ones paid. Ironically, the financial panic of 1893 facilitated the park's development. As a later newspaper account observed: "Unemployed men found work there. A second bond issue paid for their wages. The men cut trails, established drives, restored Pioneer Pavilion (a renovated factory building that was the oldest structure in the park) and built Lake Cohasset Dam".

== Challenges ==
Yet, Rogers' struggle to preserve the Mill Creek gorge was hardly over. He battled continuous efforts by various interest groups to employ the park for purposes other than those he intended. In one instance, the Rogers brothers successfully rolled back a push by local water works trustees to use Mill Creek as a source of water supply. According to one account, this was achieved "by going through the park and nailing boards on the trees showing where the water level would be if dams were built to provide the water".

Not all of Rogers' efforts on behalf of the park were successful. In 1913, a public sewer was run through Mill Creek Park, contaminating the water and leaving Rogers demoralized. The consequences were very much as Rogers had predicted, and swimming was soon inadvisable in many of the parks once pristine lakes. In the wake of this reversal, Rogers became interested in traveling. In 1919, he embarked on what he envisioned as a world tour. While exploring Colorado's Royal Gorge, Rogers caught a cold that eventually progressed into pneumonia.

== Death and legacy ==
Rogers died in Cañon City, Colorado. On November 26, 1919, about a week before his passing, he wrote matter-of-factly of his impending death to brother Bruce: "Unless there is some change, you will have a brother to bury. Better go to Orr's undertaking establishment and learn what should be done at this end of the line.... This is a sad message, but I have thought it best you know everything. I don't want any of you to worry about me. We all have to go sometime".

In 1920, less than a year after Volney Rogers' death, Youngstown Mayor Fred J. Warnock presided over the public unveiling of a massive bronze likeness of Rogers that was designed to honor his achievements. Rogers had been alerted to plans for the tribute before his death and was deeply moved. The Volney Rogers Memorial still stands near the main entrance of Mill Creek Park. At the time of its unveiling, Warnock captured the sentiments of many community residents when he stated: "We do not erect monuments to selfishness.... We erect monuments to those who live for the community and whose high ideal is the welfare of the many. That is why we are honoring Volney Rogers today". In 2000, Volney Rogers was inducted into Ohio's Natural Resources Hall of Fame for his principal role in establishing Ohio's park districts.

A middle school in the Youngstown City School District is named for Volney Rogers.
