= Molenbeek (disambiguation) =

Molenbeek-Saint-Jean (French) or Sint-Jans-Molenbeek (Dutch) is a municipality in the Brussels-Capital Region, Belgium.

Molenbeek may also refer to:

== Rivers ==
Molenbeek literally means "Mill brook" in English and is a very common name for brooks in the Netherlands and Belgium, such as:

- Molenbeek (Erpe-Mere Bovenschelde), a river in the Denderstreek, Belgium
- Molenbeek-Ter Erpenbeek, a river in the Denderstreek, Belgium
- Molenbeek or Maalbeek, a brook flowing within the municipality of Molenbeek-Saint-Jean

== Sports ==
- R. White Daring Molenbeek, a former Belgian football club
- R. Daring Club Molenbeek, a former Belgian football club
- F. C. Molenbeek Brussels Strombeek, a former Belgian football club
- R. Crossing Club Molenbeek, a former Belgian football club

== See also ==
- Molenbeek-Wersbeek, a sub-municipality of Bekkevoort, Belgium
- Molenbaix, a former municipality of Celles, Hainaut, Belgium
