= Mill Creek (Tioga River tributary) =

Watercourse in Pennsylvania, US

Coordinates: 41°52′44″N 77°07′34″W

Mill Creek is an 18.7-mile-long (30.1 km) tributary of the Tioga River in Tioga County, Pennsylvania in the United States.

Mill Creek joins the Tioga River approximately 6.0 miles (9.7 km) downstream of the borough of Mansfield.

== See also ==
- List of rivers of Pennsylvania
