= Mill Creek (Grandglaize Creek tributary) =

Stream in the American state of Missouri

Mill Creek is a stream in southern Miller County in the U.S. state of Missouri. It is a tributary of Grandglaize Creek.

The stream headwaters arise just west of Missouri Route U about 1.2 miles south of Missouri Route 42 at 38°03′50″N 92°25′21″W and it flows generally west passing just south of Brumley and under Missouri Route C to its confluence with the Grandglaize at 38°04′41″N 92°31′36″W just within the southeastern boundary of Lake of the Ozarks State Park.

Mill Creek was named for the fact a watermill operated at its bank.
