= Mill Creek (Crane Pond Creek tributary) =

Stream in the US state of Missouri

Mill Creek is a stream in southwestern Madison County and the northwest corner of Wayne County in the U.S. state of Missouri. It is a tributary of Crane Pond Creek.

The stream headwaters arise in Madison County at 37°22′01″N 90°32′51″W and the stream flows south to its confluence with Crane Pond Creek in the northwest corner of Wayne County at 37°18′49″N 90°32′38″W. The community of Brunot lies just west of the stream junction.

Mill Creek received its name on account of a gristmill on its course.

== See also ==
- List of rivers of Missouri
