= Collins Creek (Pennsylvania) =

Physical characteristics
- Source
  - location: near the base of a hill in Pittston Township, Pennsylvania
  - elevation: between 1,260 and 1,280 feet (380 and 390 m)
- Mouth
  - location: Mill Creek in Dupont, Luzerne County, Pennsylvania
  - coordinates: 41°18′35″N 75°44′55″W
  - elevation: 873 ft (266 m)
- Length: 2.8 mi (4.5 km)
- Basin size: 1.39 mi^{2} (3.6 km^{2})
- Discharge
  - average: 0.10 to 3.70 cubic feet per second (0.0028 to 0.1048 m^{3}/s)

Basin features
- Progression: Mill Creek → Lackawanna River → Susquehanna River → Chesapeake Bay

Collins Creek is a tributary of Mill Creek in Luzerne County, Pennsylvania, in the United States. It is approximately 2.8 miles (4.5 km) long and flows through Pittston Township and Dupont. The watershed of the creek has an area of 1.39 square miles (3.6 km^{2}). The creek has no named tributaries, but several drainage ditches flow into it. It is a Coldwater Fishery and is not impaired. The creek is one source of flooding in Pittston Township.

== Course ==
Collins Creek begins near the base of a hill in Pittston Township. It flows north for a short distance before turning northwest for several tenths of a mile. It then turns west before turning southwest and then west again. Several tenths of a mile further downstream, the creek enters Dupont and turns southwest for a few tenths of a mile, reentering Pittston Township. It then turns west-southwest for several tenths of a mile before reaching its confluence with Mill Creek.

Collins Creek joins Mill Creek 3.66 miles (5.89 km) upstream of its mouth.

=== Tributaries ===
Collins Creek has no named tributaries. However, a number of drainage ditches lead into the creek.

== Hydrology ==
Collins Creek is not considered to be impaired. Pittston Township and the borough of Dupont have permits to discharge stormwater into the creek.

The peak annual discharge of Collins Creek at its mouth has a 10 percent chance of reaching 230 cubic feet per second. It has a 2 percent chance of reaching 390 cubic feet per second and a 1 percent chance of reaching 470 cubic feet per second. It has a 0.2 percent chance of reaching 680 cubic feet per second.

The peak annual discharge of Collins Creek at the border between Pittston Township and Dupont has a 10 percent chance of reaching 200 cubic feet per second. It has a 2 percent chance of reaching 340 cubic feet per second and a 1 percent chance of reaching 400 cubic feet per second. It has a 0.2 percent chance of reaching 580 cubic feet per second.

The discharge of Collins Creek was measured several times in the middle of the 20th century. The values ranged from 0.10 to 3.70 cubic feet per second.

== Geography and geology ==
The elevation near the mouth of Collins Creek is 873 feet (266 m) above sea level. The elevation near the creek's source is between 1,260 and 1,280 feet (380 and 390 m) above sea level.

The headwaters of Collins Creek are on a ridge near the Wilkes-Barre Scranton International Airport. It also passes by the International Trade Zone Industrial Park and loses water to a mine pool, as does the nearby Lidy Creek.

== Watershed and biology ==
The watershed of Collins Creek has an area of 1.39 square miles (3.6 km^{2}). The stream is entirely within the United States Geological Survey quadrangle of Avoca. The creek is one of the main tributaries of Mill Creek. Its watershed is "high quality" and mountainous (as is the case with Collins Creek). According to the Lackawanna River Watershed Conservation Plan, the creek's location on United States Geological Survey quadrangle maps is erroneous.

Collins Creek is designated as a Coldwater Fishery. There is a stream site operated by the United States Geological Survey on the creek in Dupont.

Collins Creek is a source of flooding in Pittston Township.

== History ==
Collins Creek was entered into the Geographic Names Information System on August 2, 1979. Its identifier in the Geographic Names Information System is 1172217.

A storm in 1955 caused high waters on Collins Creek. However, there was little flooding in Pittston Township during that storm. In 1990, a tanker truck spilled 8000 gallons of gasoline in the area, causing emergency operations to be performed in the watershed of the creek. In 2002, the replacement of a bridge carrying Interstate 81 over the creek in Dupont was authorized for $1,100,000. Collins Creek and Lidy Creek were subjected to a restoration project that was approved in 2007. It was carried out by Sikora Brothers Paving Co. for $46,709. The Federal Emergency Management Agency funded $45,000.

== See also ==
- Lidy Creek, next tributary of Mill Creek going downstream
- List of rivers of Pennsylvania
- List of tributaries of the Lackawanna River
