= Mill Creek (Clarion River tributary) =

Mill Creek Tributary to Clarion River
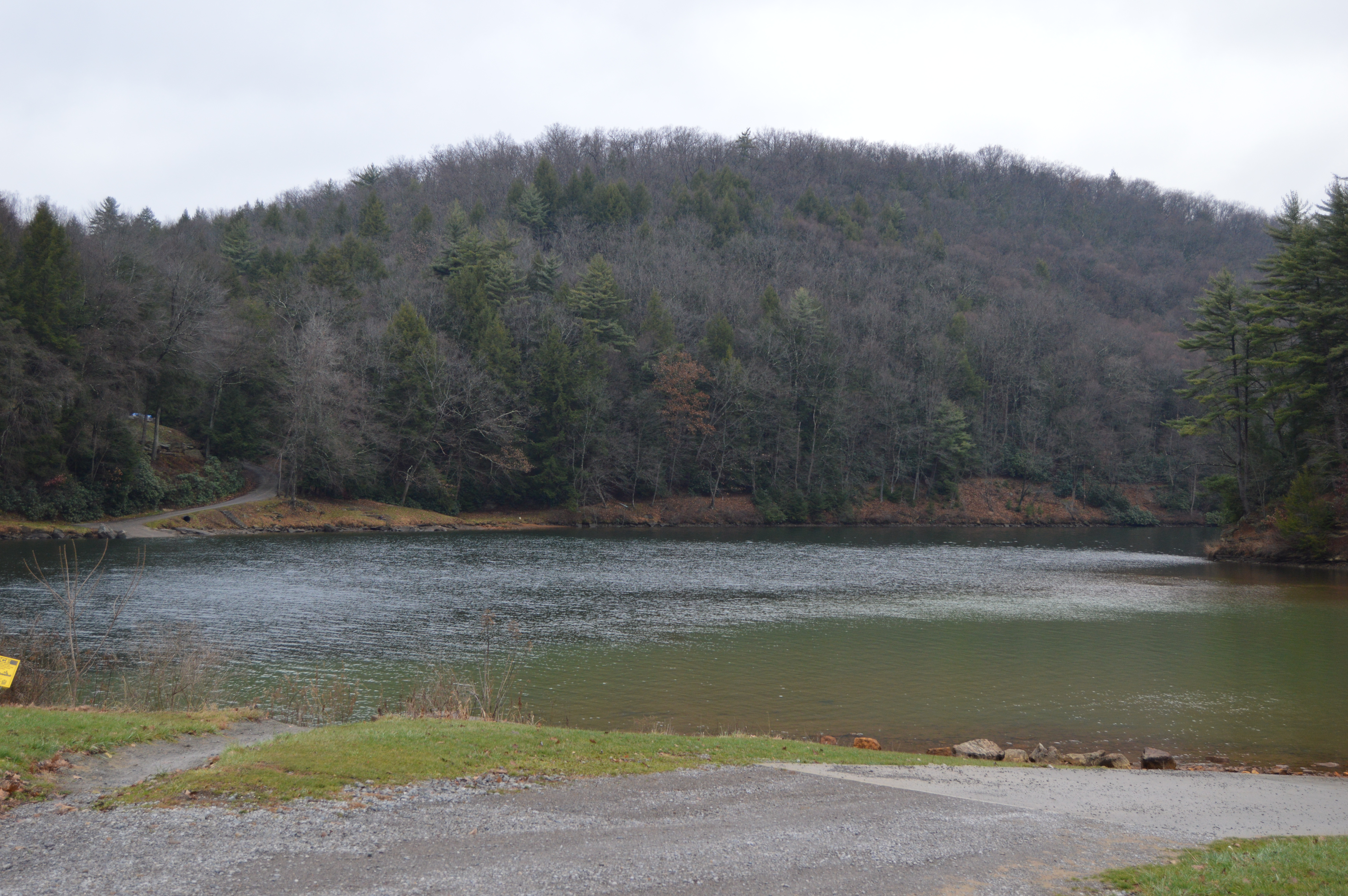
- Mill Creek confluence with the Clarion River

- Location of Mill Creek mouth Mill Creek (Clarion River tributary) (the United States)

Location
- Country: United States
- State: Pennsylvania
- Counties: Clarion; Jefferson

Physical characteristics
- Source: pond on the divide between Mill Creek and North Fork River
  - location: about 1.5 miles southwest of Sigel, Pennsylvania
  - coordinates: 41°15′32″N 079°06′35″W
  - elevation: 1,710 ft (520 m)
- Mouth: Clarion River
  - location: Millcreek, Pennsylvania
  - coordinates: 41°14′08″N 079°19′16″W
  - elevation: 1,089 ft (332 m)
- Length: 20.39 mi (32.81 km)
- Basin size: 58.98 sq mi (152.8 km^{2})
- Discharge
  - average: 105.53 cu ft/s (2.988 m^{3}/s)

Basin features
- Progression: south, then west
- River system: Clarion River (Allegheny River tributary)
- Tributaries
  - left: Parks Run; Steele Run; Little Mill Creek; Douglass Run; Whites Run
  - right: Hugh Run; Martin Run; Rankin Run; Updike Run; Pendleton Run; Woods Run; Stroup Run; Trap Run
- Bridges: PA 949, Park Road, McManigle Road, Caldwell Corners Road, Bottom Road, Jefferson County 4001, PA 949, Howe Road, Old State Road, Hudson Drive, Fisher-Strattonville Road, Millcreek Drive

Mill Creek is a tributary of the Clarion River in Clarion and Jefferson counties, Pennsylvania in the United States.

Mill Creek joins the Clarion River near the borough of Strattanville.

== Fishing ==
The Pennsylvania Fish and Boat Commission stocks the creek with brook trout three times per year, first in the spring before the opening day of the Pennsylvania trout season then two in-season stockings during May.

== See also ==
- List of rivers of Pennsylvania
- List of tributaries of the Allegheny River
