= Mill Creek (Barren Fork) =

Stream in the American state of Missouri

Mill Creek is a stream in Oregon County in the Ozarks of southern Missouri. It is a tributary of Barren Fork.

The stream headwaters are at 36°42′19″N 91°30′24″W and the confluence with Barren Fork is at 36°46′21″N 91°30′46″W.

Mill Creek was so named because a sawmill and a grist mill were located along its course.

== See also ==
- List of rivers of Missouri
