= Mill Creek (Pee Dee River tributary) =

Stream in North Carolina, USA

Mill Creek Tributary to Pee Dee River
- Location of Mill Creek mouth Mill Creek (Pee Dee River tributary) (the United States)

Location
- Country: United States
- State: North Carolina
- County: Anson

Physical characteristics
- Source: Westfield Creek divide
  - location: about 3 miles southwest of Morven, North Carolina
  - coordinates: 34°50′16″N 080°03′01″W
  - elevation: 375 ft (114 m)
- Mouth: Pee Dee River
  - location: about 1.5 miles northeast of Old Sneedsboro, North Carolina
  - coordinates: 34°51′03″N 079°54′20″W
  - elevation: 97 ft (30 m)
- Length: 10.77 mi (17.33 km)
- Basin size: 19.12 square miles (49.5 km^{2})
- Discharge
  - location: Pee Dee River
  - average: 20.46 cu ft/s (0.579 m^{3}/s) at mouth with Pee Dee River

Basin features
- Progression: east-northeast
- River system: Pee Dee River
- Tributaries
  - left: unnamed tributaries
  - right: unnamed tributaries
- Bridges: NC 145, Previtte Road, Peru Road, US 52, Sneedsboro Road, Diggs Road, Cairo Road

Mill Creek is a 10.77 mi (17.33 km) long 3rd order tributary to the Pee Dee River in Anson County, North Carolina.

== Course ==
Mill Creek rises about 3 miles southwest of Morven, North Carolina. Mill Creek then flows east-northeast to meet the Pee Dee River about 1.5 miles northeast of Old Sneedsboro.

== Watershed ==
Mill Creek drains 19.12 square miles (49.5 km^{2}) of area, receives about 48.0 in/year of precipitation, has a topographic wetness index of 480.70 and is about 45% forested.
