= Interstate 80 in Ohio =

Section of Interstate Highway in Ohio, United States

Interstate 80
- I-80 highlighted in red

Route information
- Maintained by OTIC and ODOT
- Length: 237.48 mi (382.19 km)
- Existed: 1956–present
- NHS: Entire route

Major junctions
- West end: I-80 Toll / I-90 Toll / Indiana Toll Road at the Indiana state line near Montpelier
- I-75 in Perrysburg; I-90 near Elyria; I-480 in North Ridgeville; I-71 in Strongsville; I-77 in Richfield; I-480 in Streetsboro; I-76 / Ohio Turnpike near Youngstown; I-680 / SR 11 near Youngstown
- East end: I-80 at the Pennsylvania state line in Hubbard

Location
- Country: United States
- State: Ohio
- Counties: Williams, Fulton, Lucas, Wood, Ottawa, Sandusky, Erie, Lorain, Cuyahoga, Summit, Portage, Mahoning, Trumbull

Highway system
- Interstate Highway System; Main; Auxiliary; Suffixed; Business; Future; Ohio State Highway System; Interstate; US; State; Scenic
← SR 79	→ SR 80

Interstate 80 (I-80) in the US state of Ohio runs across the northern part of the state. Most of the route is part of the Ohio Turnpike; only an 18.78-mile (30.22 km) stretch is not part of the toll road. That stretch of road is the feeder route to the Keystone Shortway, a shortcut through northern Pennsylvania that provides access to New York City.

== Route description ==
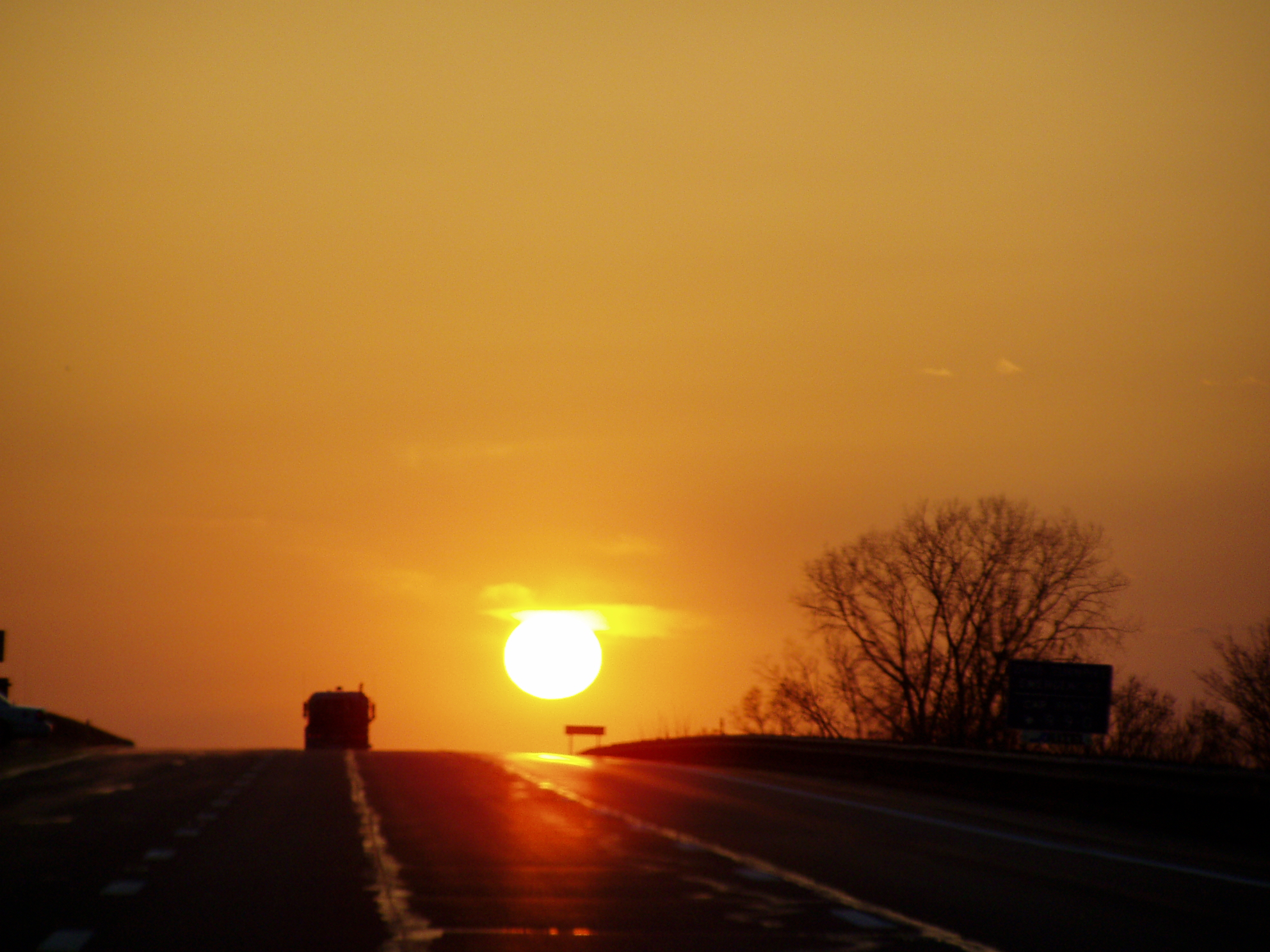
I-80 westbound Ohio Turnpike

In Ohio, I-80 enters with I-90 from the Indiana Toll Road and immediately becomes the Ohio Turnpike. The two Interstates cross rural northwest Ohio and run just south of the Toledo metropolitan area. In Rossford, the turnpike intersects with I-75 in an area known as the Crossroads of America.

In Elyria Township, Lorain County, just west of Cleveland, I-90 splits from I-80 (leaving the turnpike and running northeast as a freeway). I-80 runs east-southeast through the southern suburbs of Cleveland and retains the Ohio Turnpike designation. Just northwest of Youngstown, the Ohio Turnpike continues southeast onto I-76, while I-80 exits the turnpike and runs east to the north of Youngstown, entering Pennsylvania south of Sharon, Pennsylvania.

== History ==
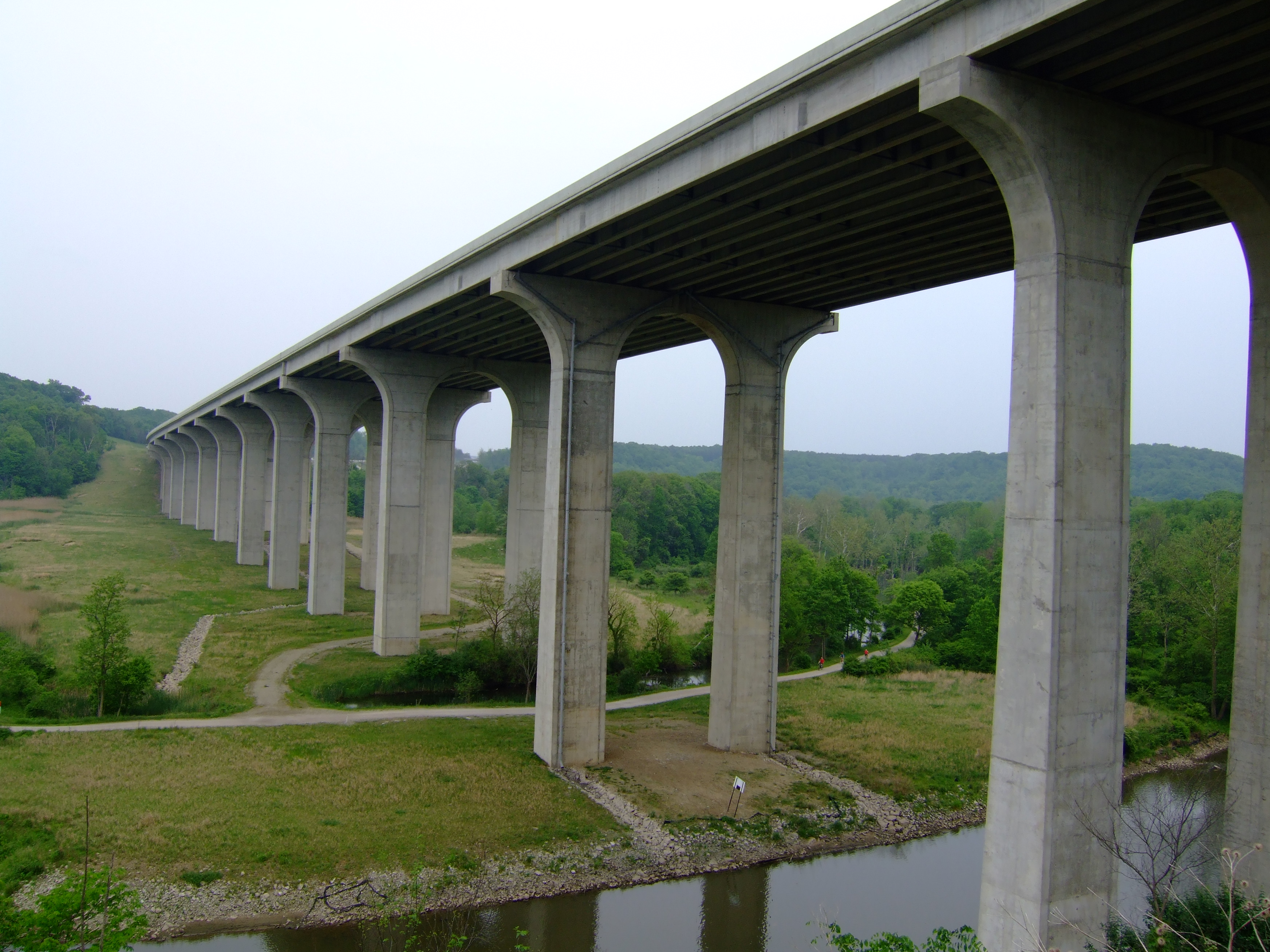
I-80 over the Cuyahoga River

I-80 was constructed as part of the Ohio Turnpike (with the exception of modern I-76 and I-480), the origins of which predate the establishment of the Interstate Highway System in 1956. The Ohio General Assembly created the Ohio Turnpike Commission in 1949, which was the first step in designing and constructing the east–west freeway. Construction began on October 27, 1952, and the freeway was completed on October 1, 1955 (a total of 38 months).

Although I-80 presently uses the Ohio Turnpike across most of the state, it was once planned to split between Norwalk and Edinburg Township, with I-80N passing through Cleveland and I-80S passing through Akron.

== Exit list ==
County	Location	mi	km	Old exit	New exit	Destinations	Notes
Williams	Northwest Township	0.0	0.0			I-80 Toll west / I-90 Toll west / Indiana Toll Road west – Chicago	Continuation into Indiana
Williams	Northwest Township	2.0	3.2	—	2	SR 49 – Edon, Edgerton	Diamond interchange with no ramp tolls, opened December 29, 1992
Williams	Northwest Township	4.0	6.4	Westgate Toll Barrier			
Williams	Holiday City	13.5	21.7	2	13	SR 15 – Bryan, Montpelier	Last westbound exit before toll; US 20A not listed on signage
Williams	Brady Township	20.8	33.5	Indian Meadow Service Plaza (westbound); Tiffin River Service Plaza (eastbound)			
Fulton	Franklin Township	25.5	41.0	2A	25	SR 66 – Archbold, Fayette	Opened November 13, 1998
Fulton	Dover Township	34.9	56.2	3	34	SR 108 – Wauseon	
Fulton	Pike Township	39.8	64.1	3B	39	SR 109 – Delta, Lyons	Opened December 20, 1996; last eastbound exit before toll
Lucas	Swanton Township	49.0	78.9	Oak Openings Service Plaza (westbound); Fallen Timbers Service Plaza (eastbound); Demolished (Note: Demolished in 2011; no plans to rebuild)			
Lucas	Swanton Township	49.0	78.9	Swanton Toll Barrier (western end of ticket system)			
Lucas	Monclova Township	52.6	84.7	3A	52	SR 2 – Swanton, Toledo Airport	Opened November 21, 1991
Lucas	Maumee	59.5	95.8	4	59	US 20 to I-475 / US 23 – Maumee, Toledo, Ann Arbor	
Wood	Rossford	64.9	104.4	4A	64	I-75 – Toledo, Dayton	Opened December 4, 1991; I-75 exit 195
Wood	Lake Township	71.7	115.4	5	71	I-280 north / SR 420 south – Toledo, Detroit, Stony Ridge	I-280 exit 1A
Ottawa	No major junctions						
Sandusky	Woodville Township	76.9	123.8	Blue Heron Service Plaza (westbound); Wyandot Service Plaza (eastbound)			
Ottawa	Elmore	81.8	131.6	5A	81	SR 51 – Elmore, Woodville, Gibsonburg	Opened February 6, 1997
Sandusky	Sandusky Township	91.6	147.4	6	91	SR 53 – Fremont, Port Clinton	
Sandusky	Riley Township	100.0	160.9	Erie Islands Service Plaza (westbound); Commodore Perry Service Plaza (eastbound)			
Erie	Groton Township	110.2	177.3	6A	110	SR 4 – Sandusky, Bellevue	Opened December 15, 1994
Erie	Milan Township	118.5	190.7	7	118	US 250 – Sandusky, Norwalk	
Lorain	Brownhelm Township	135.9	218.7	7A	135	To SR 2 / Baumhart Road – Vermilion	Opened December 13, 1995; SR 2 not signed on eastbound side
Lorain	Amherst Township	139.5	224.5	Middle Ridge Service Plaza (westbound); Vermillion Valley Service Plaza (eastbound)			
Lorain	Amherst Township	140.6	226.3	7B	140	SR 58 – Amherst, Oberlin	Opened November 30, 2004
Lorain	Elyria Township	142.8	229.8	8A	142	I-90 east / SR 2 east – Cleveland	Eastbound exit and westbound entrance; eastern end of I-90 concurrency
Lorain	Elyria	145.5	234.2	8	145	SR 57 – Lorain, Elyria	
Lorain	North Ridgeville	151.8	244.3	9A	151	I-480 east – North Ridgeville, Cleveland	Eastbound exit and westbound entrance
Lorain	North Ridgeville	152.2	244.9	9	152	To SR 10 – North Ridgeville, North Olmsted, Fairview Park, Cleveland	
Cuyahoga	Strongsville	161.8	260.4	10	161	I-71 / US 42 – Strongsville, Columbus, Cleveland	I-71 exit 233
Cuyahoga	Broadview Heights	170.1	273.7	Great Lakes Service Plaza (westbound); Towpath Service Plaza (eastbound)			
Summit	Richfield	173.2	278.7	11	173	I-77 / SR 21 – Akron, Cleveland	Direct access to I-77 opened December 3, 2001 I-77 exit 146
Summit	Boston Heights	180.3	290.2	12	180	SR 8 – Akron	
Portage	Streetsboro	187.2	301.3	13	187	I-480 west / SR 14 – Streetsboro	
Portage	Shalersville Township	193.9	312.1	13A	193	SR 44 – Ravenna	Opened December 1, 1994
Portage	Freedom Township	197.0	317.0	Portage Service Plaza (westbound); Brady's Leap Service Plaza (eastbound)			
Trumbull	Braceville Township	209.2	336.7	14	209	SR 5 – Warren	
Trumbull	Braceville Township	211	340	Newton Falls Toll Barrier (eastern end of ticket system)			
Trumbull	Lordstown	215.0	346.0	14A	215	Ellsworth–Bailey Road – Lordstown West	Eastbound exit and westbound entrance; opened June 1993
Trumbull	Lordstown	216.4	348.3	14B	216	Hallock–Young Road – Lordstown East	Westbound exit and eastbound entrance; last westbound exit before toll
Mahoning	Jackson Township	219.47	353.20		218 (EB); 219 (WB)	I-76 / Ohio Turnpike east to Penna Turnpike east – Akron, Pittsburgh	Eastern end of Ohio Turnpike concurrency; Penna Tpk. not signed eastbound
Mahoning	Jackson Township	219.47	353.20		—	CR 18 (Mahoning Avenue)	Eastbound exit only
Mahoning	Austintown Township	223.01	358.90		223	SR 46 – Niles, Canfield	
Mahoning	Austintown Township	223.91	360.35		224A	SR 11 south – Canfield	Western end of SR 11 concurrency; signed as exit 224 westbound
Mahoning	Austintown Township	224.25	360.90		224B	I-680 south – Youngstown	Northern terminus of I-680; eastbound exit and westbound entrance
Trumbull	Weathersfield Township	225.94	363.62		226	Salt Springs Road – McDonald	
Trumbull	Girard	227.15	365.56		227	US 422 – Girard	
Trumbull	Liberty Township	228.32	367.45		228B	SR 11 north – Warren, Ashtabula	Eastern end of SR 11 concurrency; signed as exit 228 eastbound
Trumbull	Liberty Township	228.48	367.70		228A	SR 711 south – Youngstown	Northern terminus of SR 711; westbound exit and eastbound entrance
Trumbull	Liberty Township	228.82– 229.47	368.25– 369.30		229	SR 193 (Belmont Avenue) / East Liberty Street	
Trumbull	Hubbard Township	234.43	377.28		234	US 62 / SR 7 – Hubbard, Sharon, PA	
Trumbull	Hubbard Township	237.28	381.87			I-80 east – New York City	Continuation into Pennsylvania
1.000 mi = 1.609 km; 1.000 km = 0.621 mi: Concurrency terminus; Incomplete access; Tolled

== Auxiliary routes ==
- I-280: A connector route that connects the Ohio Turnpike to I-75 in Toledo and its southeast suburbs
- I-480: A connector route that connects the Ohio Turnpike through the south suburbs of Cleveland
- I-480N: A spur route of I-480 to I-271 north and US 422
- I-680: A connector route that connects I-80 to the Ohio Turnpike (I-76) through Youngstown

== Notes ==
Interstate 80
Previous state: Indiana	Ohio	Next state: Pennsylvania
