= Austintown, Ohio =

- Census-designated place
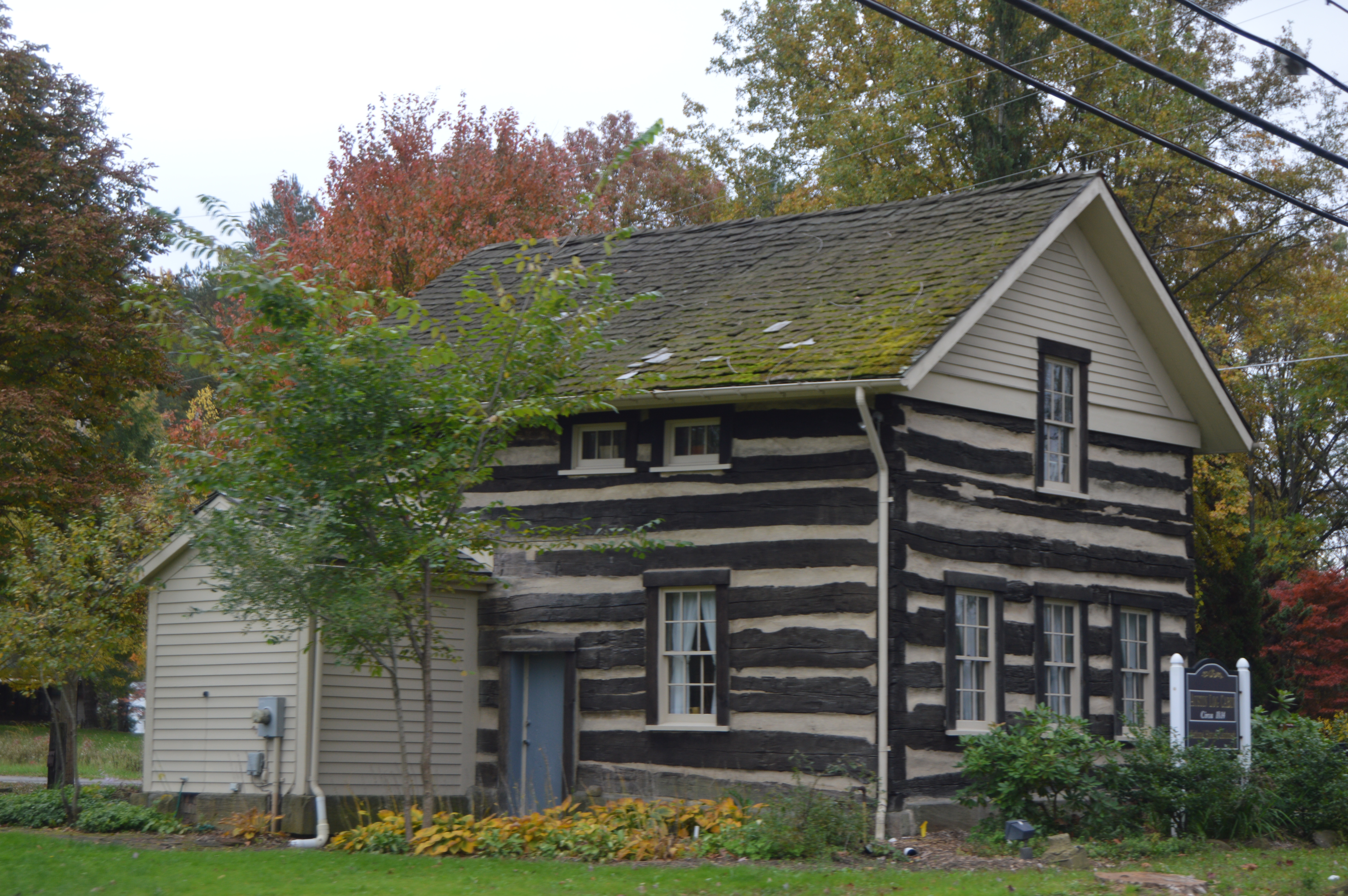
- Austintown Log House

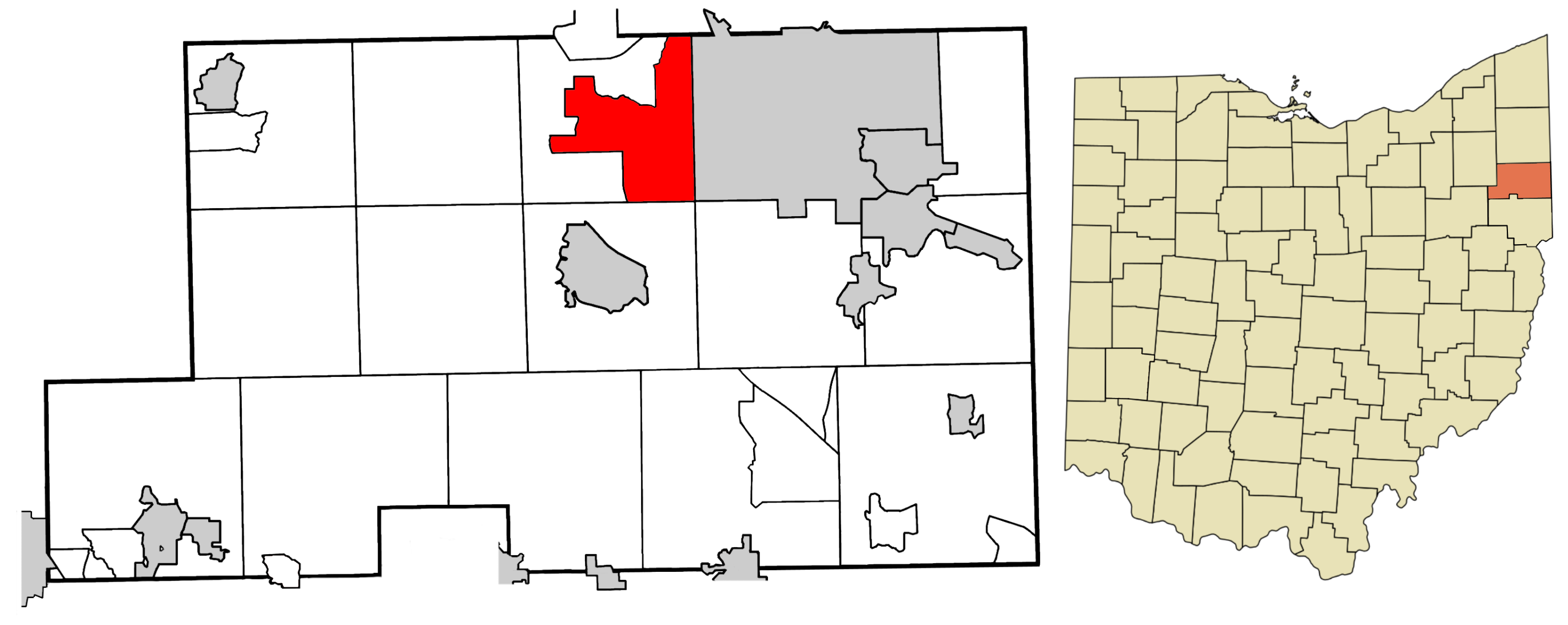
- Location in Mahoning County, Ohio

- Location within Ohio Location within the United States
- Coordinates: 41°06′10″N 80°44′37″W
- Country: United States
- State: Ohio
- County: Mahoning
- Township: Austintown

Area
  - Total: 11.65 sq mi (30.18 km^{2})
  - Land: 11.62 sq mi (30.09 km^{2})
  - Water: 0.035 sq mi (0.09 km^{2})
- Elevation: 1,135 ft (346 m)

Population (2020)
  - Total: 29,594
  - Density: 2,547.4/sq mi (983.56/km^{2})
- Time zone: UTC-5 (Eastern (EST))
  - Summer (DST): UTC-4 (EDT)
- ZIP Codes: 44515 (Austintown); 44511, 44509 (Youngstown); 44406 (Canfield)
- Area codes: 330, 234
- FIPS code: 39-03184
- GNIS feature ID: 2393324

Austintown is an unincorporated community and census-designated place in Mahoning County, Ohio, United States. It lies within Austintown Township. The population was 29,594 at the 2020 census. Located directly west of Youngstown, it is a suburb in the Youngstown–Warren metropolitan area.

== History ==
Austintown Township was founded in 1793 as township 2, range 3 of the Connecticut Western Reserve by purchase from the Connecticut Land Company. It was surveyed as a parcel of land 5 miles (8 km) on each side, as were other townships of the Connecticut Western Reserve. Austintown was named for Warren resident and Western Reserve judge Calvin Austin. In 1794, John McCollum of New Jersey became the first settler.

Throughout the 19th century, the township slowly grew; by 1880, coal miners and their families increased the population to 2,502. Some of the earliest historic sites in the community include the Austintown Log House, built in 1814, and the Judge William Shaw Anderson House, built in 1831. A post office called Orange was established on November 15, 1815, and its name was changed to Austintown on May 6, 1872. It ceased operation on May 15, 1917, forwarding mail to West Austintown, Ohio.

After World War II, Austintown experienced a population boom as suburban spillover from neighboring Youngstown extended into the eastern part of the township, while a central Austintown community developed along Ohio State Route 46. In 1980, the U.S. Census Bureau formally designated the census-designated place (CDP) of Austintown, comprising the township's urban areas.

== Geography ==
The Austintown CDP takes up slightly less than half of the area of Austintown Township, largely on the eastern side of the township, where it abuts the western border of the city of Youngstown. According to the United States Census Bureau, the CDP has a total area of 11.7 square miles (30.2 km^{2}), of which 11.6 square miles (30.1 km^{2}) is land and 0.04 square miles (0.1 km^{2}), or 0.29%, is water.

== Demographics ==
Historical population
Census	Pop.	Note	%±
1970	29,393		—
1980	33,636		14.4%
1990	32,371		−3.8%
2000	31,627		−2.3%
2010	29,677		−6.2%
2020	29,594		−0.3%

=== 2020 census ===
As of the 2020 census, Austintown had a population of 29,594. The median age was 43.6 years. 18.0% of residents were under the age of 18 and 22.6% of residents were 65 years of age or older. For every 100 females there were 89.6 males, and for every 100 females age 18 and over there were 87.2 males age 18 and over.

100.0% of residents lived in urban areas, while 0.0% lived in rural areas.

There were 13,838 households in Austintown, of which 22.4% had children under the age of 18 living in them. Of all households, 36.1% were married-couple households, 21.5% were households with a male householder and no spouse or partner present, and 34.3% were households with a female householder and no spouse or partner present. About 37.7% of all households were made up of individuals and 16.1% had someone living alone who was 65 years of age or older.

There were 14,930 housing units, of which 7.3% were vacant. The homeowner vacancy rate was 1.6% and the rental vacancy rate was 10.2%.

Racial composition as of the 2020 census
Race	Number	Percent
White	24,627	83.2%
Black or African American	2,704	9.1%
American Indian and Alaska Native	52	0.2%
Asian	185	0.6%
Native Hawaiian and Other Pacific Islander	17	0.1%
Some other race	300	1.0%
Two or more races	1,709	5.8%
Hispanic or Latino (of any race)	1,169	4.0%

=== 2000 census ===
As of the census of 2000, there were 31,627 people, 13,419 households, and 8,762 families residing in the CDP. The population density was 2,709.3 inhabitants per square mile (1,046.1/km^{2}). There were 14,179 housing units at an average density of 1,214.6 per square mile (469.0/km^{2}). The racial makeup of the CDP was 92.51% White, 5.09% African American, 0.14% Native American, 0.59% Asian, 0.03% Pacific Islander, 0.43% from other races, and 1.21% from two or more races. Hispanic or Latino of any race were 1.83% of the population.

There were 13,419 households, out of which 25.8% had children under the age of 18 living with them, 49.6% were married couples living together, 12.1% had a female householder with no husband present, and 34.7% were non-families. 30.2% of all households were made up of individuals, and 11.4% had someone living alone who was 65 years of age or older. The average household size was 2.32 and the average family size was 2.90.

In the CDP the population was spread out, with 20.9% under the age of 18, 9.0% from 18 to 24, 27.3% from 25 to 44, 25.5% from 45 to 64, and 17.2% who were 65 years of age or older. The median age was 40 years. For every 100 females there were 90.8 males. For every 100 females age 18 and over, there were 87.7 males.

The median income for a household in the CDP was $38,216, and the median income for a family was $47,507. Males had a median income of $36,797 versus $23,733 for females. The per capita income for the CDP was $19,087. About 6.2% of families and 8.8% of the population were below the poverty line, including 14.4% of those under age 18 and 6.9% of those age 65 or over.

=== 2005–2007 American Community Survey ===
Estimates produced by the Census Bureau's American Community Survey program revealed that, by 2007, the percentage of individuals below the poverty line had risen to 13.8%.

== Economy ==
Hollywood Gaming at Mahoning Valley Race Course opened in Austintown in 2014.

== Education ==
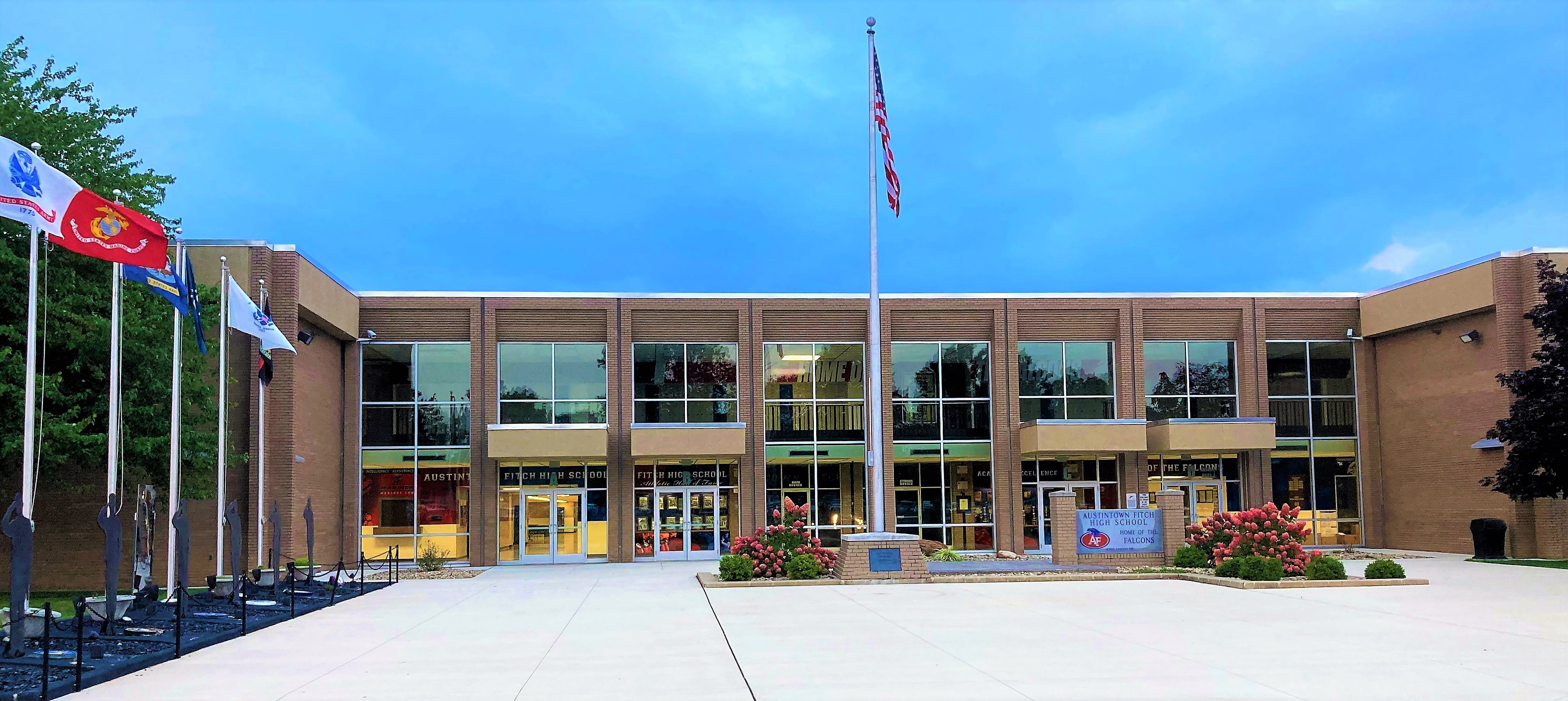
Austintown Fitch High School

Children in Austintown are served by the public Austintown Local School District, which includes one elementary school, one intermediate school, one middle school, and Austintown Fitch High School. Austintown has a public library, a branch of the Public Library of Youngstown and Mahoning County.

== Transportation ==
Ohio State Route 11 is a north–south freeway which passes through the CDP, with access from Exit 39. Interstate 680 passes east-to-west through the northern part of the CDP but provides no access. Interstate 80 passes to the north of the CDP, with access from Exit 223.

== Notable people ==
- Kenneth Carano, member of the Ohio House of Representatives from the 59th district
- Aylett R. Cotton, member of the U.S. House of Representatives from Iowa's 2nd district
- Ron Gerberry, member of the Ohio House of Representatives from the 59th district
- Irv Holdash, National Football League center and linebacker
- Laura Liu, judge for the Illinois Appellate Court for the 1st District
- Mike McGlynn, former National Football League guard
- Munnycat, indie pop duo
- Brian O'Nora, Major League Baseball umpire
- Jasper Packard, member of the U.S. House of Representatives from Indiana's 11th & At-large district
- Billy Price, active National Football League center for the New York Giants
- George Shuba, Major League Baseball outfielder and pinch hitter, remembered for breaking down the league color barrier by shaking hands with Jackie Robinson
- Davanzo Tate, former National Football League and Canadian Football League defensive back
