= Interstate 680 (Ohio) =

Highway in Ohio

Interstate 680
- Korean War Veterans Memorial Highway
- I-680 highlighted in red

Route information
- Auxiliary route of I-80
- Maintained by ODOT
- Length: 16.43 mi (26.44 km)
- Existed: 1964–present
- NHS: Entire route

Major junctions
- South end: I-76 Toll / Ohio Turnpike in North Lima
- US 224 in Boardman; US 62 / SR 7 in Youngstown; SR 711 in Youngstown
- North end: I-80 / SR 11 near Mineral Ridge

Location
- Country: United States
- State: Ohio
- Counties: Mahoning

Highway system
- Interstate Highway System; Main; Auxiliary; Suffixed; Business; Future; Ohio State Highway System; Interstate; US; State; Scenic
← SR 678	→ SR 680

Interstate 680 (I-680) in the US state of Ohio is an auxiliary Interstate Highway passing through Youngstown. Its northern terminus is at I-80, and its southern terminus is at I-76, the Ohio Turnpike.

== Route description ==
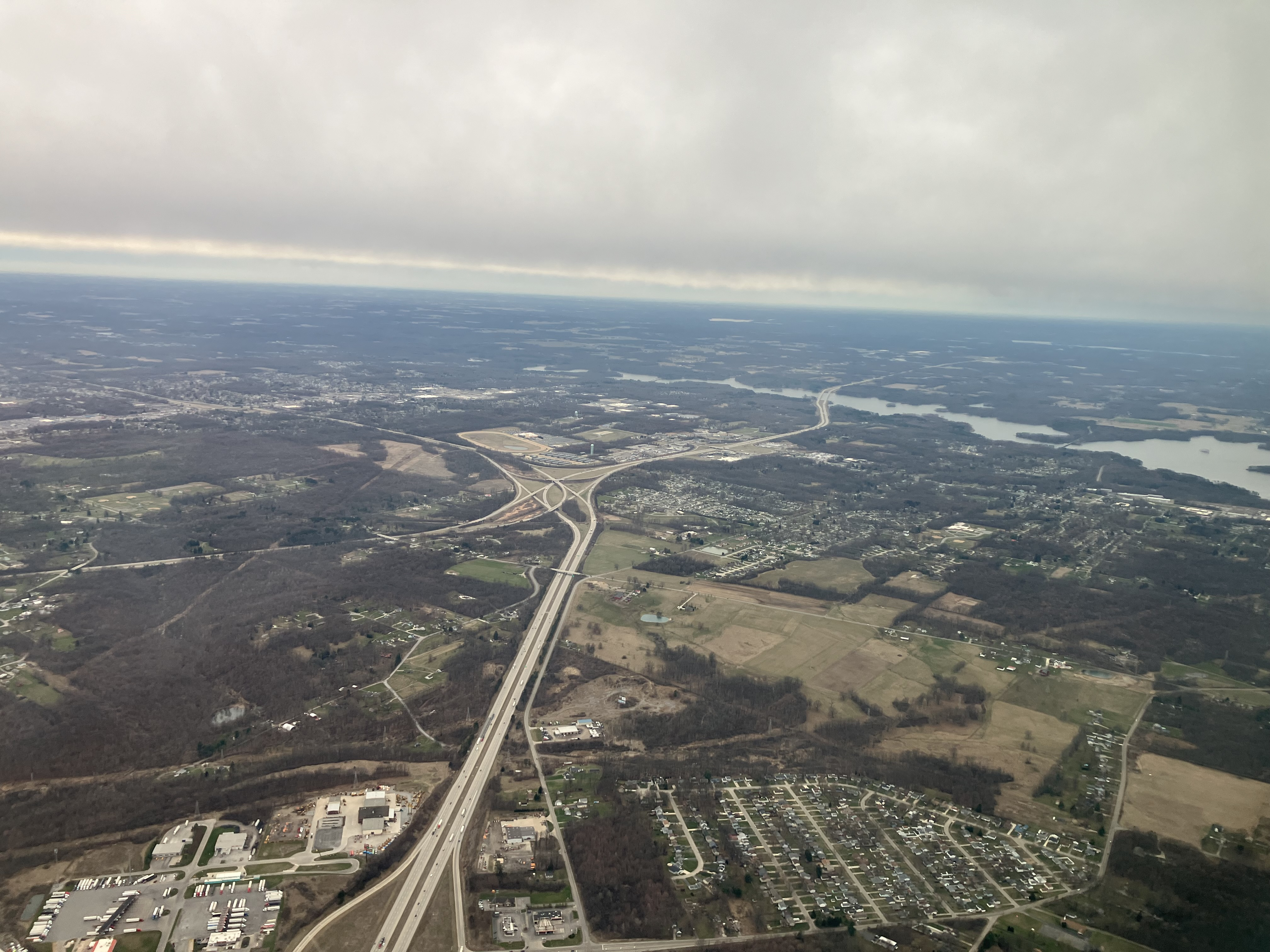
Northern terminus: top right, I-80; bottom, I-80 and SR 11; left, I-680; top left, SR 11

I-680 begins at a junction with I-80 and State Route 11 (SR 11) in Austintown. It verges southeast through a residential area in northeastern Austintown until crossing into Youngstown at milepost 2. The Interstate continues through residential areas until meeting the southern edge of Downtown Youngstown. Once leaving downtown, the roadway turns south, bound for I-76. I-680 passes through residential Boardman Township and finally Beaver Township in southern Mahoning County. Once passing the SR 164 interchange, the Interstate reaches its southern terminus at the Ohio Turnpike, allowing travel to the east on the turnpike (I-76) only.

== Exit list ==
The entire route is in Mahoning County.

Location	mi	km	Exit	Destinations	Notes
Beaver Township	16.43	26.44		I-76 Toll / Ohio Turnpike east – Pittsburgh	Southern terminus; exit 234 on I-76 / Turnpike
Beaver Township	16.05	25.83	16	SR 164 – Columbiana	Interchange opened November 27, 2019; last southbound exit before toll
Boardman Township	14.37	23.13	14	SR 164 / Western Reserve Road	
Boardman	11.81	19.01	11	US 224 – Canfield, Poland	Signed as exits 11A (west) and 11B (east) southbound
Boardman–Youngstown line	9.23	14.85	9	SR 170 – Struthers	Signed as exits 9A (west) and 9B (east) southbound
Youngstown	8.18	13.16	8	Shirley Road / Indianola Avenue	
Youngstown				Powersdale Avenue	Northbound entrance only
Youngstown	7.05	11.35	7	South Avenue to US 62 / SR 7 – Downtown	
Youngstown	6.28	10.11	6B	US 62 east / SR 7 north (Madison Avenue Expressway) / Market Street – Hubbard, Downtown	Signed as exit 6 northbound; semi-directional T interchange
Youngstown	6.03	9.70	6A	Market Street to US 62 west / SR 7 south	Southbound exit and northbound entrance
Youngstown	5.08	8.18	5	Glenwood Avenue / Mahoning Avenue	
Youngstown	4.40	7.08	4B	Salt Springs Road	Northbound exit and southbound entrance
Youngstown	4.29	6.90	4A	SR 193 to US 422 – New Castle	Trumpet interchange
Youngstown	3.74	6.02	3C (NB); 3B (SB)	Connecticut Avenue / Belle Vista Avenue	
Youngstown	3.02	4.86	3A	SR 711 north to I-80 east / M.L. King Boulevard (US 422) – Girard, New York	
Youngstown–Austintown line	2.06	3.32	2	Meridian Road	
Austintown Township	0.07	0.11	1	SR 11 south / I-80 Alt. – Canfield	Northbound left exit and southbound entrance
Austintown Township	0.00	0.00		I-80 west – Cleveland	Northern terminus; exit 224B on I-80
1.000 mi = 1.609 km; 1.000 km = 0.621 mi: Incomplete access; Tolled
