= Ohio State Route 11 =

North-south state highway in Ohio, US

State Route 11
- Lake to River Highway
- SR 11 highlighted in red

Route information
- Maintained by ODOT
- Length: 99.60 mi (160.29 km)
- Existed: c. 1967–1969–present

Major junctions
- South end: US 30 in East Liverpool
- SR 7 / SR 39 in East Liverpool; US 30 / SR 45 in West Point; US 224 in Canfield; I-80 / I-680 near Youngstown; US 422 in Girard; I-80 / SR 711 near Girard; US 322 near Orwell; US 6 near Cherry Valley; I-90 near Ashtabula; US 20 in Ashtabula
- North end: SR 531 in Ashtabula

Location
- Country: United States
- State: Ohio
- Counties: Columbiana, Mahoning, Trumbull, Ashtabula

Highway system
- Ohio State Highway System; Interstate; US; State; Scenic
← SR 10	→ SR 12

State Route 11 (SR 11) is a north–south freeway in the northeastern portion of the U.S. state of Ohio. Its southern terminus is at U.S. Route 30 (US 30) in East Liverpool at the West Virginia state line on the Jennings Randolph Bridge over the Ohio River from that state's northern panhandle; its northern terminus is at SR 531 in Ashtabula. The route is concurrent with US 30 through East Liverpool and with Interstate 80 (I-80) near Youngstown. The first section of the route to be completed, from Canfield to Austintown, opened in 1969. The entire current route was complete in 1972, and upgraded to a divided highway by 1980.

== Route description ==
The highest traffic count is at I-80 near Austintown, where 38,360 vehicles travel the highway on average each day. The lowest traffic count is near US 6, where 5,550 vehicles travel the highway on average each day.

SR 11 starts at Jennings Randolph Bridge, and becomes concurrent with US 30 and SR 39 as it turns southwest. The concurrency bends around East Liverpool, SR 39 leaves the concurrency, and SR 7 joins it. The route finally turns north and leaves East Liverpool. It turns northwest, near the southern terminus of SR 170. It intersects the concurrency termini of SR 7 and US 30 in these three miles. SR 11 travels through forests, passes by Lisbon, only connecting with SR 154 at an interchange. The highway travels north to near Leetonia, where it meets SR 344 at a diamond interchange. The forests slowly change into farmland, as it passes under SR 14 and into Mahoning County.

In Mahoning County, the route becomes part of the eastern city limits of Canfield, meeting US 224 at a parclo interchange. The highway crosses over the Ohio Turnpike, and becomes concurrent with I-80 few miles later. Here, most of the route is surrounded by urban areas. The interchange with I-80 and I-680 is incomplete, with ramps from I-680 west to I-80 east and I-80 west to I-680 east missing. I-80 and SR 11 travel northeast, leaves Mahoning County, and enters Trumbull County. SR 11 and I-80 split at the interchange at SR 711, east of Girard. This interchange is also incomplete, with ramps from I-80 east to SR 711 south and SR 711 to I-80 west missing.

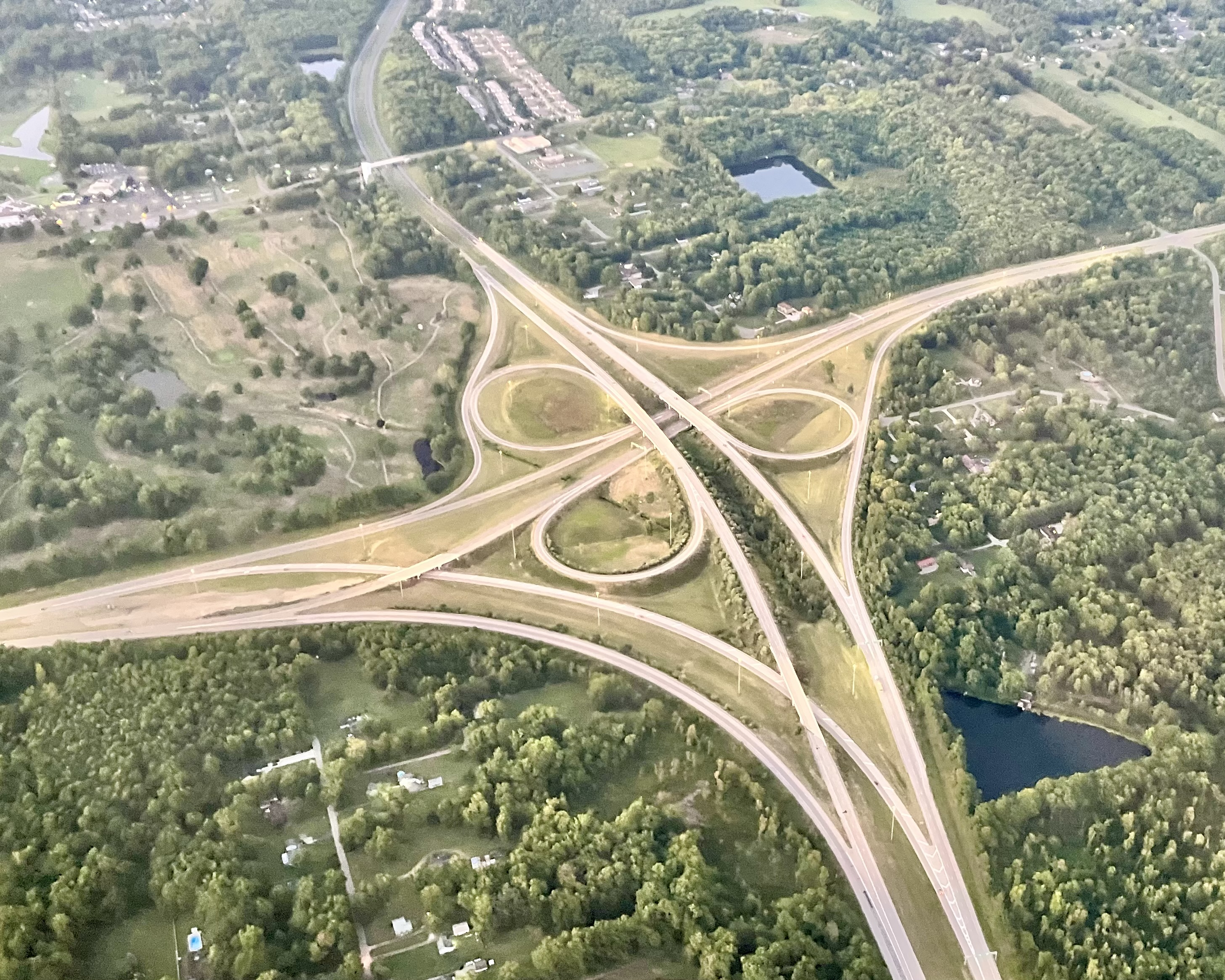
Aerial photograph of SR 11 (top to bottom) and SR 82 (left to right) interchange

SR 11 continues north toward Ashtabula, meeting interchanges for SR 82 and an access road to the Youngstown-Warren Regional Airport. Urban areas transition back into rural areas here. It later intersects SR 305 and SR 5 at diamond interchanges near Cortland. The route then enters Ashtabula County, and travels in a straight line, passing through US 322, a rest area, US 6, and SR 307. Mostly forests and fields are between the highway. The route slowly bends northwest, and meets I-90 at a cloverleaf interchange. The route crosses over Ashtabula River, and bypasses Ashtabula. It ends at SR 531, part of the Lake Erie Circle Tour, at a pair of stop signs.

== History ==
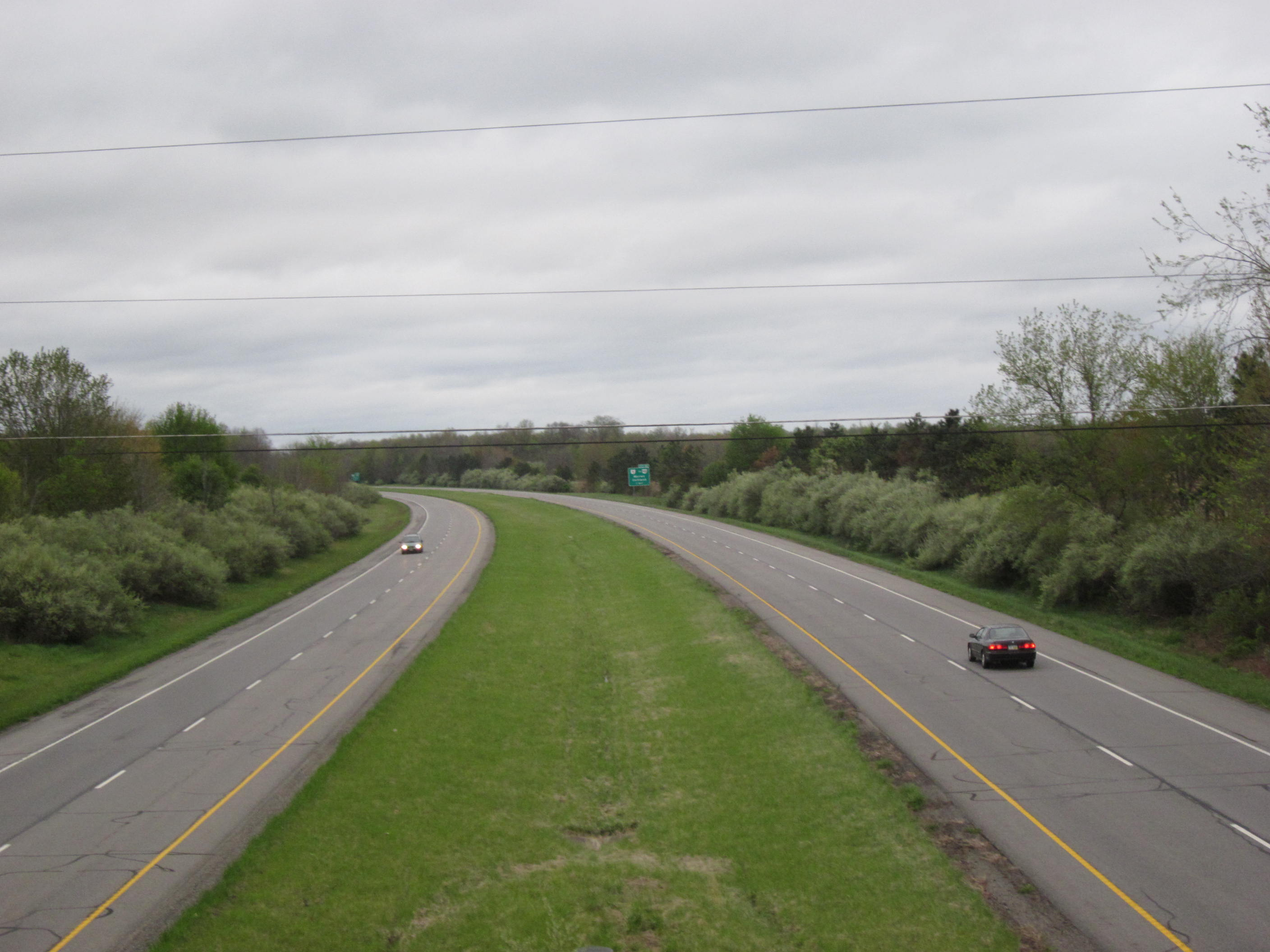
SR 11 near SR 5

SR 11 was designated between 1967–1969 as a connector between Canfield and Austintown. Two years later, it was extended north to I-80, and south to SR 7, five miles (8.0 km) north of East Liverpool. A section from SR 531 to SR 307 was also completed. Those two sections were later connected. By 1972, all parts of the route were complete. SR 11 was upgraded to a limited access highway, from SR 82 to SR 307, between 1972 and 1981. In 2000, construction began for the King Graves Road interchange, which opened a year later. On October 24, 2005, the interchange at SR 711 and I-80/SR 11 opened, after it was modified to connect SR 711. The only rest area on SR 11 received turn lanes in 2011.

SR 11 was designated as the "Lake to River highway" on September 28, 1973. The section in Ashtabula County was also designated as the "Marine Private Henry Kalinowski Memorial Highway" on April 7, 2009. Around 2002, the section in East Liverpool, starting from Newell Street, and ending at the state line, was designated as the "Lou Holtz Freeway".

The original routing of SR 11 in the modern 1923 system went from western Ohio to southeastern Ohio via Dayton and Chillicothe. It was replaced in its entirety by a portion of U.S. Route 35 by 1935, with a concurrency of the routes lasting briefly.

=== Chemical spills ===
There have been three chemical spills on SR 11. The first one happened on November 30, 1984. A tanker truck leaked titanium tetrachloride at the I-80/SR 11 interchange at Girard. About 200 residents who lived near the highway were evacuated. No injuries were reported, and the chemicals were soon contained. A spill was reported on July 7, 1996. A tanker truck spilled methyl alcohol onto SR 11 northbound, in Fairfield Township. The spill was contained, and charges were filed against the driver. The third and most recent one, happened on September 9, 2003. A tanker spilled one US gallon (3.8 L) of a flammable solvent between SR 344 and SR 154. There were no evacuations.

== Exit list ==
At present, Columbiana County does not have exit numbers on some destination signage.

County	Location	mi	km	Exit	Destinations	Notes
Ohio River		0.00	0.00		US 30 east – Pittsburgh	Continuation into West Virginia
Ohio River		0.00	0.00	Jennings Randolph Bridge; southern terminus of SR 11 and its concurrency with US 30 at the West Virginia state line		
Columbiana	East Liverpool	0.14	0.23	—	SR 39 east – Midland	Southern end of SR 39 concurrency
Columbiana	East Liverpool	0.85– 1.18	1.37– 1.90	—	Downtown East Liverpool	
Columbiana	East Liverpool	1.78	2.86	245	SR 7 (West Eighth Street) / SR 39 – Wellsville	Southern end of SR 7 concurrency; northern end of SR 39 concurrency; no access from north to east
Columbiana	St. Clair Township	4.77	7.68	242	SR 170 – Calcutta, East Palestine	Southern terminus of SR 170, Exit number based upon US 30 mileage.
Columbiana	St. Clair–Madison township line	7.39	11.89	239	SR 7 (Lisbon Street) / SR 267 – Rogers	Northern end of SR 7 concurrency; northern terminus of SR 267
Columbiana	Madison Township	10.82	17.41	11	US 30 (East Liverpool Road) to SR 45 – West Point, Lisbon	Northern end of US 30 concurrency
Columbiana	Elkrun Township	15.38	24.75	15	SR 154 to US 30 – Rogers, Lisbon	
Columbiana	Fairfield Township	23.78	38.27	23	SR 344 – Columbiana, Leetonia	
Mahoning	Beaver Township	27.14	43.68	27	SR 46 (Columbiana–Canfield Road) to SR 14	
Mahoning	Canfield Township	34.06	54.81	34	US 224 (Boardman–Canfield Road) – Canfield, Poland	
Mahoning	Austintown Township	39.32	63.28	39	CR 18 (Mahoning Avenue) – Austintown	
Mahoning	Austintown Township	41.24	66.37	41A 224	I-80 west – Cleveland	Northbound exit and southbound entrance; I-80 east exit 224A
Mahoning	Austintown Township	41.24	66.37	41B	I-680 south – Youngstown	Northbound exit and southbound entrance; I-680 exit 1
Trumbull	Weathersfield Township	43.08	69.33	226	Salt Springs Road	Exit numbers follow I-80
Trumbull	Girard	44.29	71.28	227	US 422 (South State Street) – Girard	Exit numbers follow I-80
Trumbull	Liberty Township	45.22	72.77	228 46A	I-80 east – New York City	Left entrance southbound; northern end of I-80 concurrency; I-80 west exit 228B; southbound access via SR 711 exit 46A
Trumbull	Liberty Township	45.71	73.56	—	SR 711 – Youngstown	Southbound exit and northbound entrance
Trumbull	Liberty Township	48.31	77.75	48	Tibbetts-Wick Road	
Trumbull	Vienna Township	51.67	83.15	51	SR 82 – Warren, Sharon	Modified cloverleaf interchange
Trumbull	Vienna–Fowler township line	54.68	88.00	54	King Graves Road	Access to Youngstown-Warren Regional Airport and Air Reserve station
Trumbull	Fowler Township	57.41	92.39	57	SR 305 (Wilson Sharpsville Road) – Cortland, Hartford	
Trumbull	Johnston Township	61.47	98.93	61	SR 5 (Warren Road) to SR 88 – Cortland	
Trumbull	Greene–Gustavus township line	67.97	109.39	68	SR 87 (Kinsman Road) – Middlefield, Jamestown	
Ashtabula	Colebrook Township	73.05	117.56	73	US 322 – Orwell, Jamestown	
Ashtabula	New Lyme Township	77.96	125.46	78	US 6 – Chardon, Andover	
Ashtabula	Lenox–Dorset township line	84.56	136.09	84	SR 307 – Jefferson	
Ashtabula	Denmark Township	87.97	141.57	87	SR 167 – Jefferson	
Ashtabula	Plymouth Township	92.62	149.06	92	SR 46 (State Road)	Northern terminus of SR 46
Ashtabula	Plymouth Township	94.02	151.31	94	I-90 – Cleveland, Erie	I-90 exit 228
Ashtabula	Plymouth Township	95.18	153.18	95	CR 329 (Seven Hills Road)	
Ashtabula	Ashtabula Township	96.51	155.32	96	SR 84 (South Ridge Road)	
Ashtabula	Ashtabula Township	97.43	156.80	97	US 20 (North Ridge Road) – Ashtabula	
Ashtabula	Ashtabula	98.77	158.95	98	21st Street	
Ashtabula	Ashtabula	99.60	160.29		SR 531 (East Sixth Street) / LECT – North Kingsville	Northern terminus of SR 11 at a T-intersection with stop signs
1.000 mi = 1.609 km; 1.000 km = 0.621 mi: Concurrency terminus
