= Ohio State Route 711 =

State highway in northeastern Ohio, US

State Route 711

Route information
- Maintained by ODOT
- Length: 3.35 mi (5.39 km)
- Existed: 1974–present

Major junctions
- South end: I-680 in Youngstown
- US 422 in Youngstown; I-80 near Girard
- North end: SR 11 near Girard

Location
- Country: United States
- State: Ohio
- Counties: Mahoning, Trumbull

Highway system
- Ohio State Highway System; Interstate; US; State; Scenic
| ← SR 710 | → SR 714 |

State Route 711 (SR 711), also known as the "Robert E. Hagan Memorial Highway" between its southern terminus and US 422, is a three-mile (5 km), four-lane, north–south, limited access freeway. It is located in Mahoning and Trumbull counties. Its termini are I-680 to the south and the I-80 / SR 11 interchange to the north. The north-end ramps are directional, only serving travelers to and from the east via Interstate 80 and the north via State Route 11.

== History ==
Local leaders first suggested a highway linking Girard and Youngstown in 1968. Originally the four-lane divided highway ended at US 422 and Burlington Street when it was completed in 1971. Money wasn't made available for the US 422 to I-80 connector until 1999, and construction on the section began in 2002. The project was finished in 2005, opening October 24 of that year, with a total cost of about $60 million.

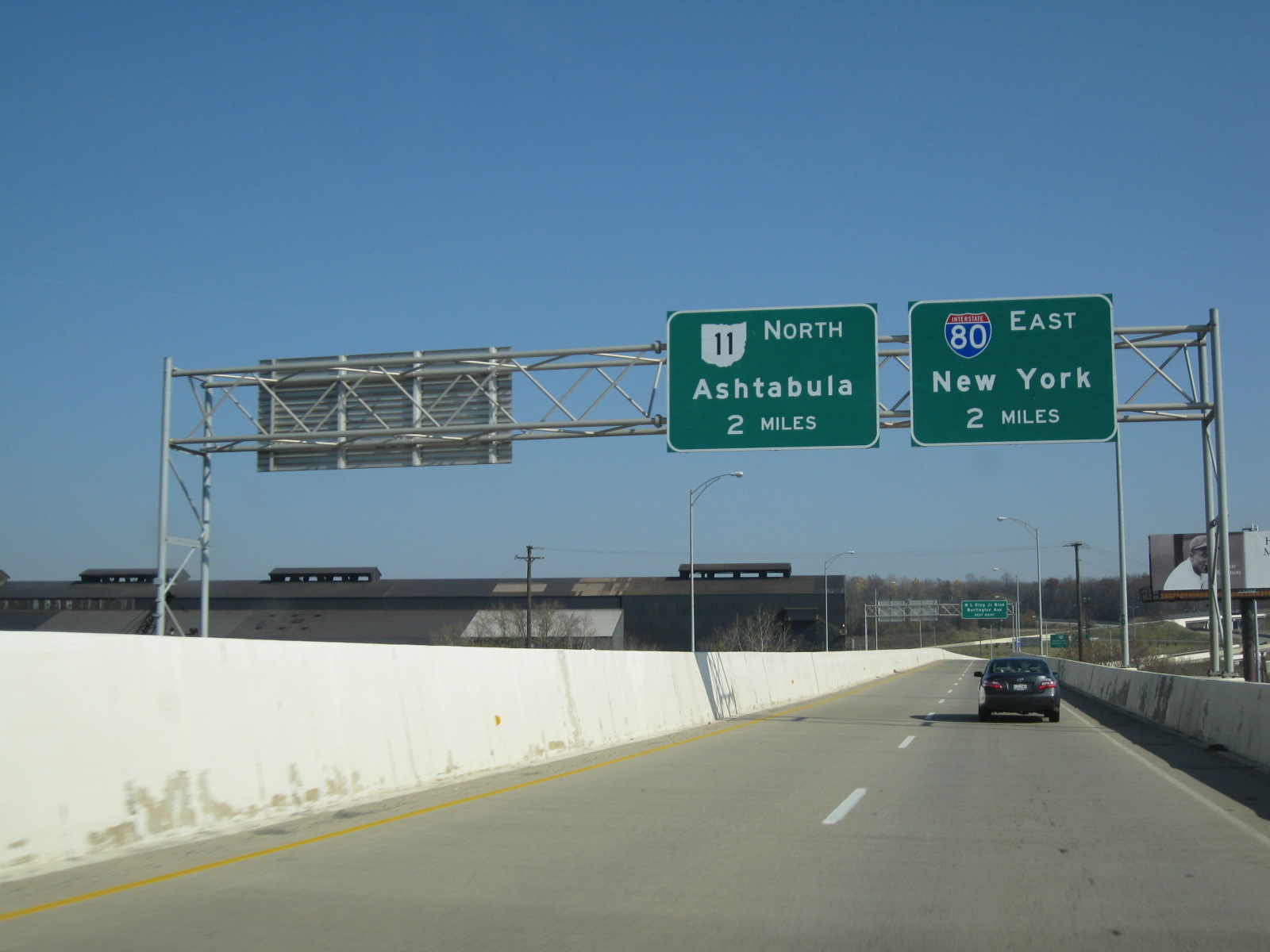
Northbound State Route 711 near its southern terminus with Interstate 680 in Youngstown

== Exit list ==
| County | Location | mi | km | Exit | Destinations | Notes |
|---|---|---|---|---|---|---|
| Mahoning | Youngstown | 0.00– 0.38 | 0.00– 0.61 | — | I-680 – Cleveland, Pittsburgh | Southern terminus; exit 3A on I-680 |
| Mahoning | Youngstown | 0.67 | 1.08 | — | Stephens Street / Salt Springs Road | No northbound exit |
| Mahoning | Youngstown | 1.24 | 2.00 | — | US 422 (Martin Luther King Boulevard) / Burlington Street – Youngstown, Girard | |
| Mahoning–Trumbull county line | Youngstown–Girard line | 2.00 | 3.22 | — | To SR 193 (Belmont Avenue) / Gypsy Lane | |
| Trumbull | Liberty Township | 3.16 | 5.09 | 46A | I-80 east – New York | Left entrance southbound; no northbound entrance; exit number follows SR 11 mileage; exit unnumbered northbound; exit 228A on I-80 |
| Trumbull | Liberty Township | 3.35 | 5.39 | | SR 11 north – Ashtabula, Warren | Northern terminus; exit 46B on SR 11; access to Youngstown-Warren Regional Airport |
1.000 mi = 1.609 km; 1.000 km = 0.621 mi: Concurrency terminus; Incomplete access
