= James W. Shocknessy =

American politician

James W. Shocknessy (November 26, 1906 - July 15, 1976) was a politician from Columbus, Ohio of the Democratic Party.

Shocknessy was the first chairman of the Ohio Turnpike Commission, and was a delegate to the Democratic National Convention from Ohio in 1956 and 1960. He was appointed to the Ohio Board of Regents for a term from September 21, 1975 to September 20, 1976, and served as Regent for just under a year before his death, after which Governor James A. Rhodes appointed N. Victor Goodman.

The position of James W. Shocknessy Professor of Law exists at Ohio State University. In his memory, the Ohio Turnpike was named the James W. Shocknessy Ohio Turnpike.
