= Davanzo Tate =

American gridiron football player (born 1984)

Profile
- Position: Defensive back

Personal information
- Born: January 15, 1985 (age 41); Austintown, Ohio
- Listed height: 5 ft 10 in (1.78 m)
- Listed weight: 185 lb (84 kg)

Career information
- College: Akron
- NFL draft: 2008: undrafted

Career history
- New York Giants (2008)*; Calgary Stampeders (2009)
- * Offseason or practice squad member only

Career CFL statistics
- Tackles: 22
- Sacks: 0
- Interceptions: 1
- Stats at CFL.ca (archived)

Davanzo Tate (born January 15, 1985) is a former American and Canadian football defensive back free agent. He was signed by the New York Giants as an undrafted free agent in 2008. He played college football for the Akron Zips.

Tate has also played for the Calgary Stampeders.
