= George Cappuzzello =

American baseball player (born 1954)

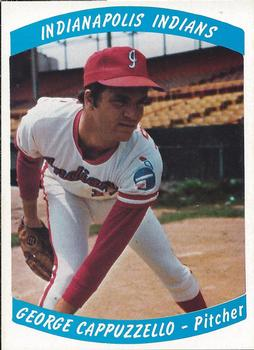
- Pitcher
- Born: January 15, 1954 (age 72); Girard, Ohio, U.S.
- Batted: Right Threw: Left

MLB debut
- May 31, 1981, for the Detroit Tigers

Last MLB appearance
- August 5, 1982, for the Houston Astros

MLB statistics
- Win–loss record: 1–2
- Earned run average: 3.23
- Strikeouts: 32
- Stats at Baseball Reference

Teams
- Detroit Tigers (1981); Houston Astros (1982)

George Angelo Cappuzzello (born January 15, 1954) is an American former professional baseball player who pitched for the Detroit Tigers and Houston Astros. He played with two different teams over two seasons and ended his playing career in 1982.

== Early years ==
Cappuzzello was born in Girard, Ohio, and attended Youngstown State University. He completed his studies at Florida State University, where he played baseball. Cappuzzello was drafted by the Detroit Tigers in the 27th round of the 1972 Major League Baseball draft.

Cappuzzello spent a good number of years in the farm system before he was traded to the Cincinnati Reds on March 6, 1978, along with John Valle, in exchange for Reds pitcher Jack Billingham. Just two years later, Cappuzzello was released by the Reds and subsequently picked up by his former team, the Detroit Tigers. After sparkling in Triple-A ball that season, Cappuzzello was called up to the big leagues.

== Major League debut ==
Cappuzzello made his debut with the Tigers on May 31, 1981, against the Baltimore Orioles. Cappuzzello did not fare well, giving up three earned runs and walking three batters in an inning of work. Nonetheless, Cappuzzello stayed with the team for the remainder of the season, starting in three games and coming in relief during 15 others. He posted a 3.48 earned run average (ERA) and went 1–1 for the season.

== Later career ==
Before the start of the 1982 season, Cappuzzello was released by the Tigers and picked up a week later by the Houston Astros. With the Astros, Cappuzzello worked in relief and pitched brilliantly in 19 1/3 innings of work, giving up 16 hits, and striking out 13 while posting a 2.79 ERA. This high point, however, turned out to be Cappuzzello's final performance as a major league pitcher. His professional baseball career came to an unexpected end.
