= Austintown Township, Ohio =

Township in Ohio, US

- Township
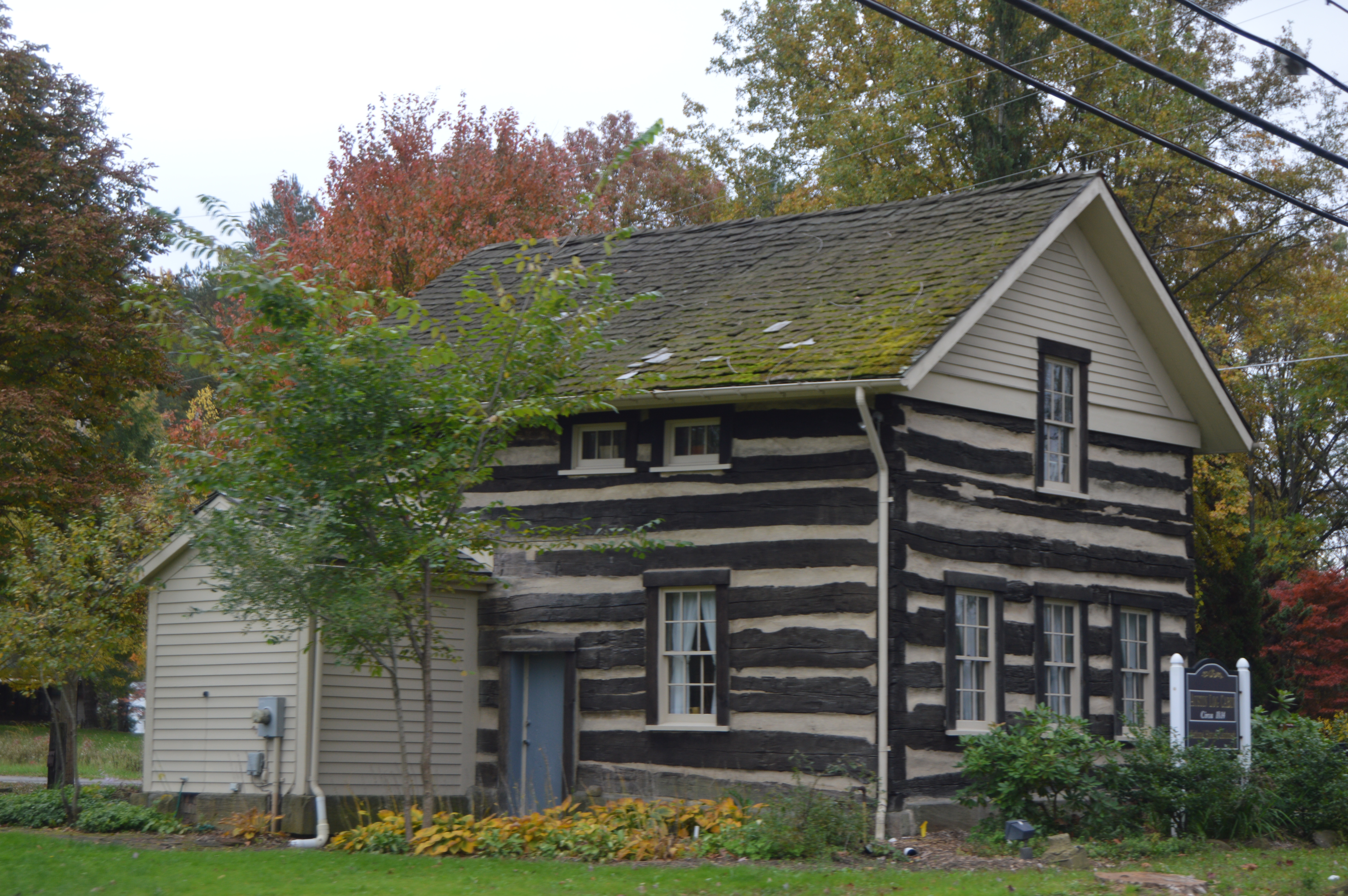
- The Austintown Log House

- Flag

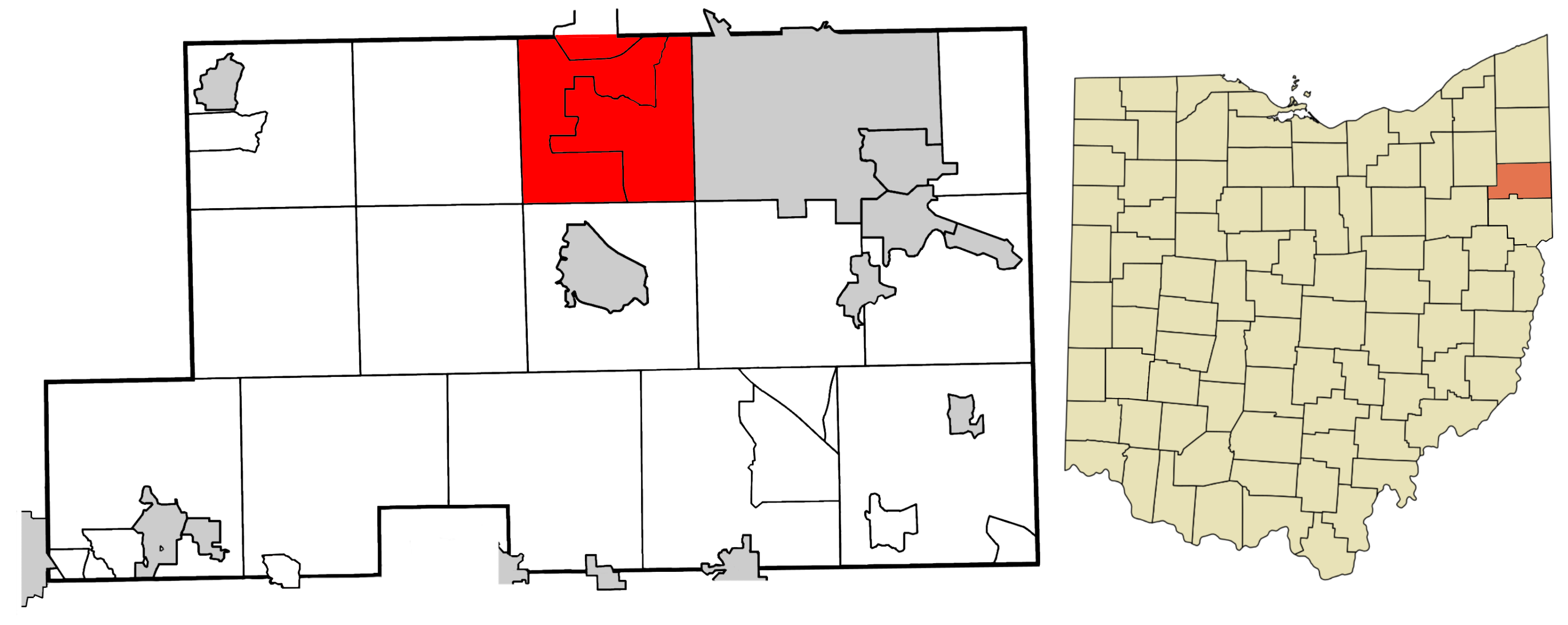
- Location of Austintown Township in Mahoning County
- Coordinates: 41°5′46″N 80°44′46″W
- Country: United States
- State: Ohio
- County: Mahoning

Area
  - Total: 26.3 sq mi (68.1 km^{2})
  - Land: 24.8 sq mi (64.2 km^{2})
  - Water: 1.5 sq mi (3.9 km^{2})
- Elevation: 1,138 ft (347 m)

Population (2020)
  - Total: 36,049
  - Density: 1,450/sq mi (562/km^{2})
- Time zone: UTC-5 (Eastern (EST))
  - Summer (DST): UTC-4 (EDT)
- ZIP code: 44515
- Area codes: 234/330
- FIPS code: 39-03198
- GNIS feature ID: 1086555
- Website: www.austintowntwp.com

Austintown Township is one of the fourteen townships of Mahoning County, Ohio, United States. The 2020 census found 36,049 people in the township.

== Geography ==
Located in the northern part of the county, it borders the following townships:

- Weathersfield Township, Trumbull County - north
- Liberty Township, Trumbull County - northeast corner
- Youngstown - east
- Boardman Township - southeast corner
- Canfield Township - south
- Ellsworth Township - southwest corner
- Jackson Township - west
- Lordstown - northwest corner

No municipalities are located in Austintown Township, although two census-designated places are located there: Austintown in the east (with 44% of the township's area and 81% of its population), and part of Mineral Ridge in the north.

The Meander Creek Reservoir occupies the western portion of the township. Ax Factory Run creek flows west to east through central portion of the township with Woodside Lake forming a section of the creek.

Interstates 80 and 680 and State Route 11 are major traffic systems crossing Austintown. One exit on I-80 and one exit on State Route 11 serve the township.

== Name and history ==
It is the only Austintown Township statewide.

== Government ==
The township is governed by a three-member board of trustees, who are elected in November of odd-numbered years to a four-year term beginning on the following January 1. Two are elected in the year after the presidential election and one is elected in the year before it. There is also an elected township fiscal officer, who serves a four-year term beginning on April 1 of the year after the election, which is held in November of the year before the presidential election. Vacancies in the fiscal officership or on the board of trustees are filled by the remaining trustees.
