= Judge William Shaw Anderson House =

Historic house in Ohio, United States

- U.S. National Register of Historic Places
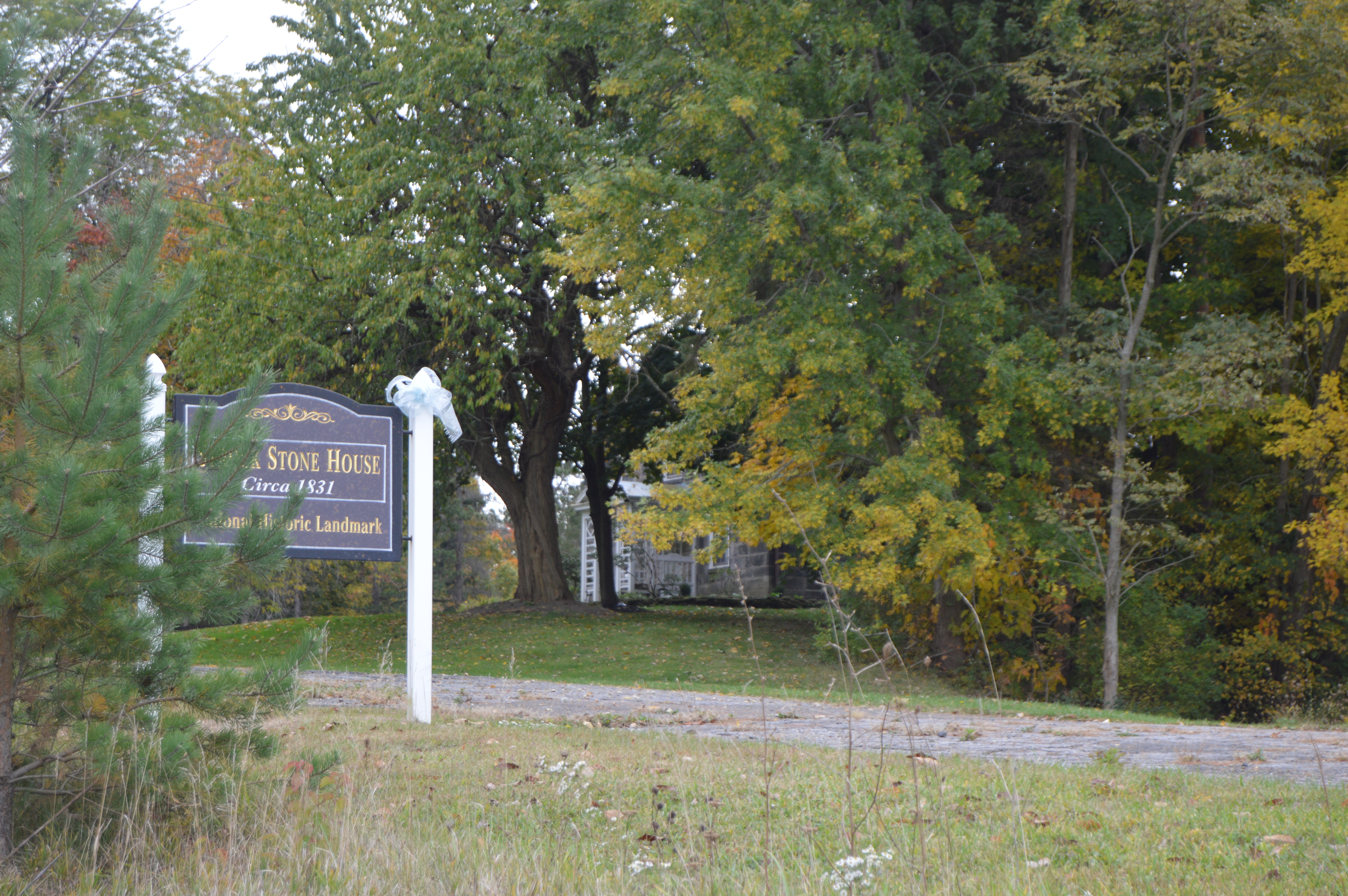
- Roadside view of the Judge William Shaw Anderson House, located at 7171 Mahoning Avenue in Austintown Township, Mahoning County, Ohio, United States. Built in 1830, it is listed on the National Register of Historic Places.

- Location within Ohio Location within the United States
- Location: 7171 Mahoning Ave., Austintown, Ohio
- Coordinates: 41°5′49.79″N 80°48′42.32″W
- Architect: William Strock
- Architectural style: Federal and Classical Revival
- NRHP reference No.: 76001479
- Added to NRHP: 1976-03-17

Judge William Shaw Anderson House is a building in Austintown, Ohio, United States, listed in the National Register of Historic Places on 1976-03-17. It is also known as the "Strock Stone House."

== Historic uses ==
- Single Dwelling

=== History of the Strock Stone house ===
==== 1831 to 1890 ====
The Judge William Shaw Anderson house, also known as the Strock Stone House, was built in 1831 of huge blocks of sandstone, some weighing as much as 750 pounds, quarried from Stony Ridge on South Turner Road in Austintown.

The 1921 publication, History of Youngstown and the Mahoning Valley, says the Strock Stone house was built in 1830 by William McClure. However, the first residents were William Strock and his family. Strock was born June 12, 1801, to Joseph Strock and Betsy Bensinger Strock in Tyrone Township, Pennsylvania. Strock's entire family migrated to Austintown in 1813 or 1815. The Strocks settled in the southern part of Austintown township near the Smiths Corner area. William became a carpenter and married Lydia Crum. The couple had three children, two of whom died as infants. In 1830, Strock bought 87 acres (350,000 m^{2}) of land in Great Lot 8, Township 2, Range 3 of the Western Reserve from John Jordan and had McClure build the house there.

In 1851, Strock sold the house and the accompanying 108 acres (0.44 km^{2}) to Francis Henry. Henry was active in the Restoration (reformed Baptist) movement. The Strock Stone house was reputedly a stop on the Underground Railroad that smuggled fugitive slaves to safety in Canada. This claim has yet to be proven, but some evidence appears to support it. Austintown was listed in Galbreath's History of Ohio as part of the path of the Underground Railroad that included "Salineville, New Lisbon, Canfield, Austintown, Edinburgh, Warren, Bloomfield, Rome, Lenox, Austinburg, Ashtabula Harbor." William Strock's brother, John Henry Strock, was described as one of the first abolitionists in Mahoning County. Additionally, Francis Henry appears on William Seibert's 1898 list of known underground railroad operators in Mahoning County. Finally, Heffelfinger's unpublished History of Meander says that slaves were hidden in a tunnel that connected the house basement with the barn. Henry lived in the Strock Stone house with his wife, Mary, and their four children. .

In 1863, Henry sold the Strock Stone house to David Anderson. Anderson was a native of Derry, Northern Ireland who immigrated to Philadelphia in 1831 or 1832. According to the History of Youngstown and the Mahoning Valley, Anderson worked setting curbstones for five years in Philadelphia. While in Philadelphia, he met Jonathan Wick who brought him to Brookfield area in 1839. Anderson and Wick eventually opened a store, Anderson and Wick, in Austintown. In 1843, Anderson opened a general store in Jackson Township, which he operated for 37 years. The 1870 census listed David Anderson as the wealthiest man in Austintown Township with a real estate value of $42,000 and a personal estate value of $24,570.

Anderson and his wife, Hannah L. Shaw Anderson, had four children including William Shaw Anderson, David Fitch Anderson, Julia E. Anderson, and Margaret J. "Maggie" Anderson. After Hannah died of an accidental fall in 1879, Anderson reportedly let the Strock Stone house fall into disrepair. Donald Heffelfinger's unpublished History of the Meander says that Anderson moved to a nearby frame house that was built during the American Civil War. The Strock Stone house became an animal shelter.

==== 1890 to present ====
In 1890, David Anderson's oldest son, William Shaw Anderson, acquired the property from his father. The younger Anderson originally used the Strock Stone house as a summer home. Anderson, who lived in the house from 1890 to 1925, was a prominent lawyer and judge in the Youngstown Court of Common Pleas. Anderson reportedly entertained President William McKinley at the house.

Anderson and his wife, Louise Shields Anderson, had four children: Blanche Anderson, William Noble Anderson, Randall H. Anderson, and Anna Anderson. Anderson restored the house and expanded it between 1912 and 1918. This addition included the sun porch, dining room, and dinette on first floor, three bedrooms and a bath on the second floor, and an enlarged cellar. Anderson also added central heat. Other buildings on the property at this time included three barns, a pump house, a poultry house, a bull barn, a log house, a milk house, an ice house, a tool house, a tool shop and a corn crib.

Anderson's children, Randall H. and Blanche Anderson, acquired the Strock Stone house upon their father's death in 1925. In 1929, they sold the house and lands to the Mahoning Valley Sanitary District (MVSD). The house served as the residence for the Chief Engineer of the MVSD until 1985.

=== The Strock Stone House today ===
The Austintown Historical Society maintains the Strock Stone House with help from the Mahoning Valley Sanitary District. The Society maintains and furnishes the interior using period rugs and furniture donated by residents of Austintown including a slave quilt from South Carolina.

The display includes a collection of antique washing machines in the basement. The parlor contains antique furniture including an organ. One bedroom of the Strock Stone House contains period children's games and clothing. Another room is set up as a lady's bedroom with antique clothes including a wedding dress, coats, bloomers, purses, woolen swimsuits, and a Depression sheet made from sugar sacks. The third bedroom, the man's bedroom, includes appropriate male furnishings including a man's shirt with a removable celluloid collar and collar keeper, a trunk circa 1890 from London, a wooden suitcase from Germany, and lift top commode. The fourth room, the quilting room, is furnished with an antique quilt rack complete with an antique quilt cover in the process of being made, a treadle sewing machine, a yarn winder, and a wooden ironing board accompanied by eight metal irons. The fifth bedroom, the office, includes an antique printing press, two 1920 Remington typewriters on an antique desk, five ledger books dated 1901 from local grocery stores, antique books, and pictures of early businesses in Austintown.

The back porch is arranged as a summer kitchen and includes an enamel top table; a Hoosier cabinet; an enamel wood fired stove; an antique enamel sink; antique dishes, cooking utensils and bake ware; pressure cookers and canning jars; and vintage spice and storage containers.

The house is open for free guided tours the first Sunday of every month from March–December from 1-3 and by appointment for other times.

== Notes ==
Galbreath, C. B..(1925). History of Ohio. Chicago: American Historical Society. Heffelfinger, Donald D. (1969). History of Meander. Unpublished manuscript. Pogany, J. (2007). Images of Austintown. Arcadia Publishing Company. Sanderson, T. W. (1920) 20th century history of Youngstown and Mahoning County, Ohio and Representative Citizens. Chicago, Illinois: Biographical Publishing Co. Siebert, W. (1898) The Underground Railroad from Slavery to Freedom. New York: MacMillan Strock, Ronald Wesley. (1984).The Descendants of Joseph Strock of 1757. Closson Press. Upton, Harriet Taylor. A Twentieth Century History of Trumbull County, Ohio: A Narrative Account of its Historical Progress, its People and its Principal Interests
