= Ohio Turnpike =

Toll highway in the United States

Ohio Turnpike
- James W. Shocknessy Ohio Turnpike
- Ohio Turnpike highlighted in green

Route information
- Maintained by OTIC (Note: The name of the agency was the Ohio Turnpike Commission until July 1, 2013, when the name was changed to its current form by the Ohio General Assembly.)
- Length: 241.26 mi (388.27 km)
- Existed: October 1, 1955–present
- Component highways: I-80 from Indiana state line to North Jackson; I-90 from Indiana state line to Elyria; I-76 from North Jackson to Pennsylvania state line

Major junctions
- West end: I-80 Toll / I-90 Toll / Indiana Toll Road at the Indiana state line
- I-75 in Rossford; I-280 in Stony Ridge; I-90 near Elyria; I-480 in North Ridgeville; I-71 in Strongsville; I-77 in Richfield; I-480 in Streetsboro; I-76 / I-80 near North Jackson; I-680 near Boardman
- East end: I-76 Toll / Penna Turnpike at the Pennsylvania state line

Location
- Country: United States
- State: Ohio

Highway system
- Ohio State Highway System; Interstate; US; State; Scenic

The Ohio Turnpike, officially the James W. Shocknessy Ohio Turnpike, is a controlled-access toll road in the U.S. state of Ohio, serving as a primary corridor between Chicago and Pittsburgh. The road runs east–west for 241 miles (388 km) in the northern section of the state, with the western end at the Indiana–Ohio border near Edon where it meets the Indiana Toll Road, and the eastern end at the Ohio–Pennsylvania border near Petersburg, where it meets the Pennsylvania Turnpike. The road is owned and maintained by the Ohio Turnpike and Infrastructure Commission (OTIC), headquartered in Berea.

Built from 1949 to 1955, construction for the roadway was completed a year prior to the Interstate Highway Act. The modern Ohio Turnpike is signed as three Interstate highways: I-76, I-80 and I-90.

== Route description ==
The entire length of the Ohio Turnpike is 241.3 miles (388.3 km), from the western terminus in Northwest Township near Edon, where it meets the Indiana Toll Road at the Ohio–Indiana border, to the eastern terminus in Springfield Township near Petersburg where it meets the Pennsylvania Turnpike at the Ohio–Pennsylvania border. Most of the turnpike, 218.7 miles (352.0 km) between the Indiana border and an interchange with Interstate 76 (I-76) near Youngstown, is signed as part of I-80, while the eastern 22.6 miles (36.4 km), between the I-80/I-76 interchange and the Pennsylvania border, is signed as part of I-76. For 142.8 miles (229.8 km), between the Indiana border and Elyria, I-90 is cosigned with I-80 as part of the turnpike.

The Ohio Turnpike does not pass directly into any major city, but does provide access to the four major metro areas in northern Ohio through connected routes. Two auxiliary Interstate highways, I-271 near Cleveland and I-475 near Toledo, cross the turnpike, but do not have direct connections. In Northwest Ohio, the turnpike passes through the southern part of the Toledo metropolitan area, with direct access to Toledo through I-75 and I-280.

In Northeast Ohio, the turnpike passes through the southern suburbs of Greater Cleveland and the northern edge of the Akron metro area, with direct access to Cleveland via I-71, I-77, I-90 and I-480. Akron is connected to the turnpike via I-77 and State Route 8 (SR 8) in the north and I-76 on the east. The turnpike is located on the western and southern edges of the Mahoning Valley, with direct access to Youngstown through the remaining portion of I-80 east of the Turnpike, and access to I-680 via the westbound lanes only.

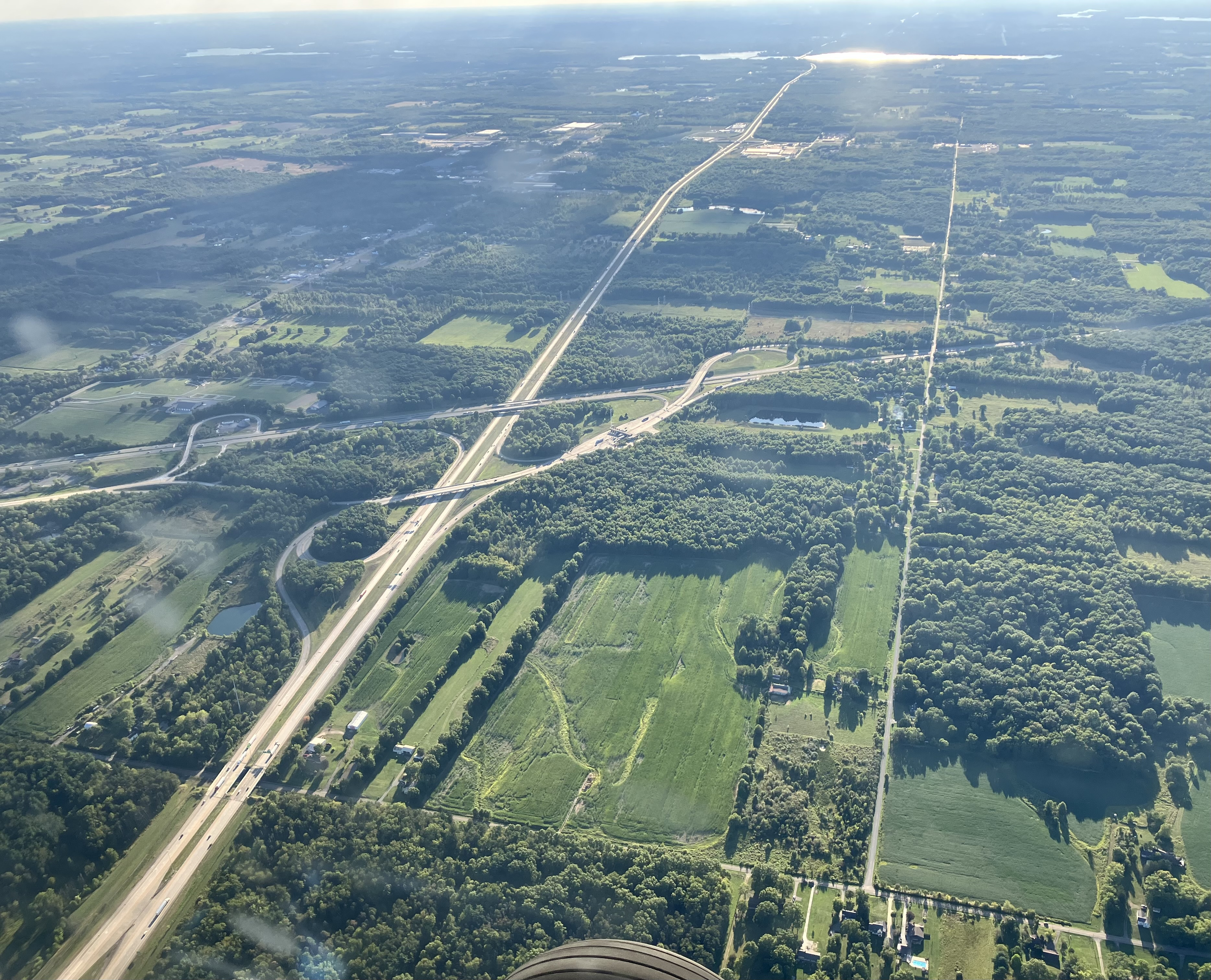
Aerial photograph of I-80 (bottom left to right) and I-76 (left to top) interchange

In North Jackson, I-80 and I-76 swap rights-of-way at a double trumpet interchange; I-76 continues east as I-80 and I-80 continues southeast as I-76, carrying the turnpike with it. In Petersburg, I-76 crosses the state line into Pennsylvania, automatically becoming the Pennsylvania Turnpike.

== History ==
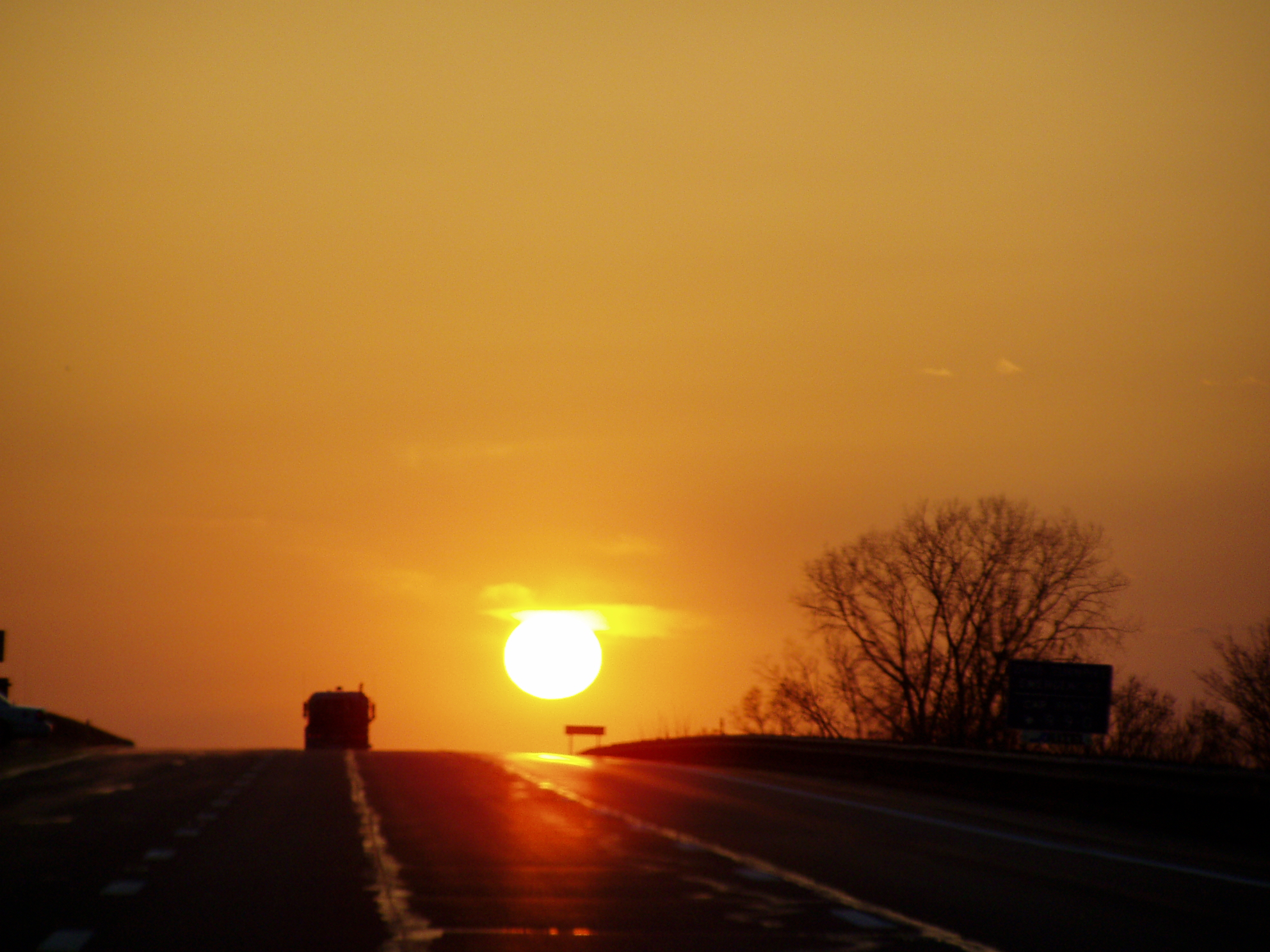
Westbound Ohio Turnpike

In 1947 a bill was introduced in the Ohio General Assembly authorizing a privately financed roadway. Originally consisting of a system of five highways, the turnpike was reduced to one when the other four were made redundant by the Federal Aid Highway Act of 1956. Construction for the road cost $326 million and was recorded as the biggest project in state history, with 10,000 employees, more than 2,300 bulldozers, graders, loaders and other machines over a 38-month period.

On December 1, 1954, the first 22-mile (35 km) stretch (the portion lying east of SR 18) opened near the present-day exit 218 for I-76 and I-80. Several motorists attended a dedication ceremony, with over 1,000 people joining a caravan, following a snow plow and a patrol cruiser, to become the first to drive the turnpike. The remaining section from exit 218 west to Indiana opened on October 1, 1955. A connecting ramp near the Indiana state line closed on August 16, 1956, the day before the Indiana Toll Road was opened; this ramp had been used to allow traffic access to US 20 to cross into Indiana. As originally built, the turnpike offered 18 access points.

The Ohio Turnpike originally had a 65 mph (105 km/h) limit for cars and 55 mph (89 km/h) limit for trucks. The automobile speed limit was increased on September 30, 1963, in concert with other Ohio rural Interstates to 70 mph (110 km/h).

Exit 10 was rebuilt to provide access to Interstate 71 when that road was built across the turnpike, while still retaining access to its original US 42 access point. This came with a relocated toll plaza and trumpet interchange. The existing overpass was not demolished, though the original trumpet ramps were abandoned. The work was completed in November 1966.

Exit 15 was rebuilt as part of construction of the ODOT maintained portion of interstate 80. Previously serving the surface alignment of Ohio State Route 18, upon the opening of the new ramps, it would instead serve the road. Work on the new interchange was completed in 1972; a connection to County Road 18 (old SR 18) using part of the original interchange was completed between 1997 and 1999.

In 1974, construction was completed on exit 8A, a new interchange with Interstate 90.

In 1974, construction began on exit 16A, a new interchange to serve Interstate 680. It was completed in 1975.

The turnpike was renamed in honor of original chairman James W. Shocknessy in 1976.

Due to the National Maximum Speed Law, a 55 mph speed limit took effect in 1974 for all vehicles. The 55 mph limit remained until 1987 when the Ohio General Assembly adopted the federally permitted 65 mph maximum speed limit, but for automobiles only.

In 1991, exit 4A was opened to serve Interstate 75.

On December 29, 1992, the unnumbered interchange at SR 49 was opened. There are no ramp tolls at this interchange; the Westgate toll barrier was, at the same time, demolished and replaced by a new Westgate Toll barrier, which is located east of SR 49.

In 1994, ticket dispensers were added to interchanges in order to reduce congestion.

Many infill interchanges were added in the 1990s. Exit 6A was opened on December 15, 1994, and exit 7A was opened the next year on December 13. This was followed by exit 3B on December 20, 1996, exit 5A on February 6, 1997, and exit 2A on November 18, 1998.

In December 2001, construction was completed on a project to reconstruct exit 11 to add new ramps to Interstate 77, in addition to replacing and expanding the toll plaza and ramps, the former of which was left in as truck parking space.

The Ohio Turnpike Commission began phasing in distance-based exit numbers in 1998. In September 2002, the sequential numbering system was retired.

Governor Taft asked the Ohio Turnpike Commission to work with ODOT and the OSHP to formulate a plan to encourage truck traffic to use the turnpike instead of parallel highways, improving the safety of those other roadways. The three organizations created a plan with three points. The truck speed limit was increased from 55 to 65 mph (89 to 105 km/h) for consistency with the automobile limits. Enforcement of truck weight and speed limits on parallel highways was increased, and truck toll rates were lowered in a trial. The speed limit increase took effect on September 8, 2004.

Exit 140 opened on November 30, 2004. It had first been proposed in 1993.

The Ohio Turnpike Commission had been hesitant to deploy an electronic tolling system, citing an apparent lack of commuter travel as well as significant implementation expenses. In December 2006, the commission indicated their intention to move forward with the implementation of an E-ZPass-compatible system as a "customer convenience". E-ZPass was activated on the turnpike on October 1, 2009. With this, variable message signs were added at all toll plazas to differentiate between E-ZPass lanes and traditional staffed toll lanes, and gates were installed to prevent motorists from evading tolls or causing accidents. They also added support for debit cards and credit cards for customers without E-ZPass, becoming the first publicly owned toll road in the U.S. (second overall) to allow users to pay tolls with a debit or credit card.

On December 20, 2010, the Ohio Turnpike Commission voted to increase the speed limit of the Ohio Turnpike to 70 mph. Despite opposition from the Ohio Trucking Association, the increase was approved by the commission by a vote of 4–1 and went into effect on April 1, 2011.

In July 2012, the way tickets were paid for was tweaked to deter truckers from trying to evade them, which had been an issue since the road opened. They also removed staffed toll lanes at the low-capacity interchanges.

Ken Blackwell, the defeated candidate in the 2006 Ohio gubernatorial election, had announced a plan for privatizing the turnpike, similar to plans enacted on the Chicago Skyway and Indiana Toll Road. In 2010 and 2011, Governor John Kasich stated that he would consider a turnpike lease, but only during a prosperous economic period. In August 2011, Kasich stated his intention to create a task force to produce a leasing plan and also considered the option of reassigning the maintenance of the highway to the Ohio Department of Transportation (ODOT). Ultimately he decided against both, instead proposing to issue more debt under the renamed Ohio Turnpike and Infrastructure Commission, with cash tolls raised annually over a ten-year period to compensate.

A project to add one lane in each direction from Toledo to Youngstown was started in 1996, using financing from increased tolls. It was originally projected to be finished in 2005, but was not completed until the end of the 2014 construction season.

In March 2019, the turnpike commission announced plans for a complete revamp of the toll barriers. The Westgate toll plaza was demolished and replaced with a new facility 1 mile (1.6 km) east of the original one. The new toll plaza features four cash lanes in each direction along with two express E-ZPass lanes, allowing E-ZPass users to travel through the toll areas at 70 mph (110 km/h). In addition, the Eastgate toll plaza was converted to serve only westbound traffic, with five cash lanes and two express E-ZPass lanes. Two additional mainline toll plazas were built at milepost 49 in Swanton Township (on the former site of the Oak Openings and Fallen Timbers service plazas) and at milepost 211 in Newton Falls, which became the new western and eastern ends of the ticket system, and tolls ceased to be collected at exits between each respective new barrier and the nearest existing toll plaza, creating a simplistic barrier toll system between those stretches. The construction also features new patron dynamic message signs that provide drivers with dynamic messaging. Part of the largest building program on the toll road since its original opening in 1955, the system was implemented on April 10, 2024. Driver confusion over the system prompted the OTIC to create a 60-day toll grace period on August 13, 2024. The Ohio State Highway Patrol cited in a report that a series of fatal accidents at the Swanton barrier on August 15, 2024, were caused in part by this confusion, and the National Transportation Safety Board has opened an investigation into them.

== Services ==
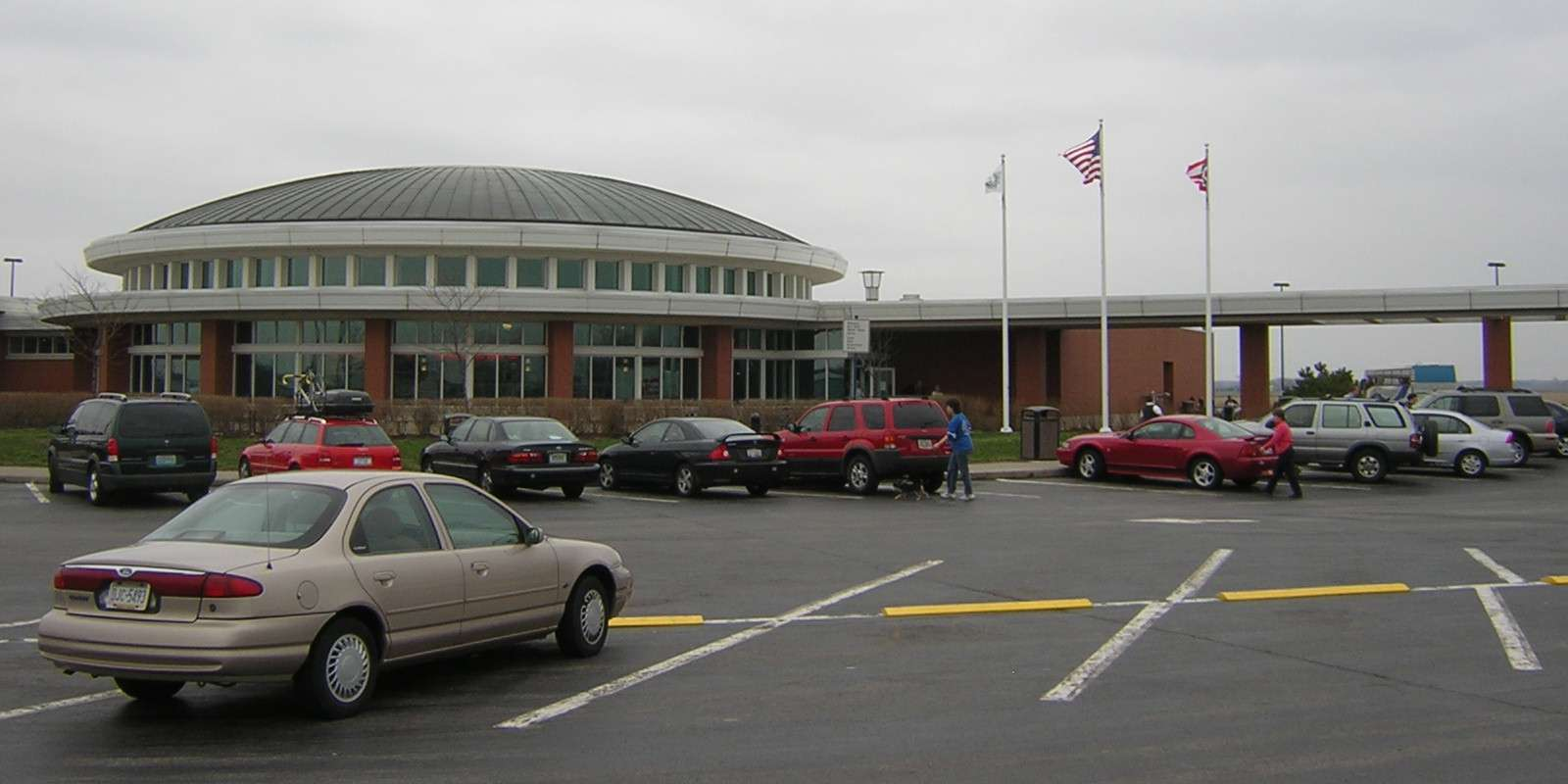
Commodore Perry Service Plaza

The Ohio Turnpike has had service plazas since its inception. Service plazas differ from typical freeway rest areas in that they offer amenities such as 24-hour food and fuel service; motorists do not have to pass through toll booths to re-fuel, use the restroom, or eat.

In 1998, the Ohio Turnpike Commission began modernizing the service plazas, first demolishing the original plazas and then reconstructing them from the ground up. Initially, the new plazas were rebranded by signage depicting them as "travel centers", but reverted to the original nomenclature.

In addition to modern restrooms, the new plazas offer several fast food choices, which vary between the plazas. They also include ATMs, gift shops, travel information counters, Wi-Fi internet access, and facilities for truck drivers, including shower facilities, lounge, and laundry areas. Sunoco fuel stations are provided at all service plazas along the Ohio Turnpike. The company signed a new contract to operate all 16 plazas on the Ohio Turnpike beginning in 2012. Facilities for overnight RV campers are provided at the service plazas located at mile markers 20, 76, 139, and 197.

Service plazas are located in pairs (one for each side of the turnpike) near mile markers 20, 76, 100, 139, 170, 197, and 237.

The Oak Openings and Fallen Timbers service plazas in Lucas County west of Toledo at mile marker 49 were the least utilized, so were closed and demolished; the Swanton toll barrier was later built at the site. A replacement pair of plazas had been planned to be built to the west in Fulton County, but ultimately were not built. Due to the lack of a municipal water/sewer system, the Indian Meadow and Tiffin River service plazas located near mile marker 20 in Williams County were demolished in 2006, though they were eventually rebuilt and reopened on June 29, 2011. The Glacier Hills and Mahoning Valley Service Plazas at mile 237 - also initially fated to be closed and demolished permanently - reopened in 2013.

Since the turnpike opened, the Ohio Turnpike Commission has contracted with the Ohio State Highway Patrol (OSHP) District 10 to provide law enforcement, as well as assistance to disabled or stranded motorists. It monitors Citizen's Band channel 9 for distress calls.

== Tolls ==
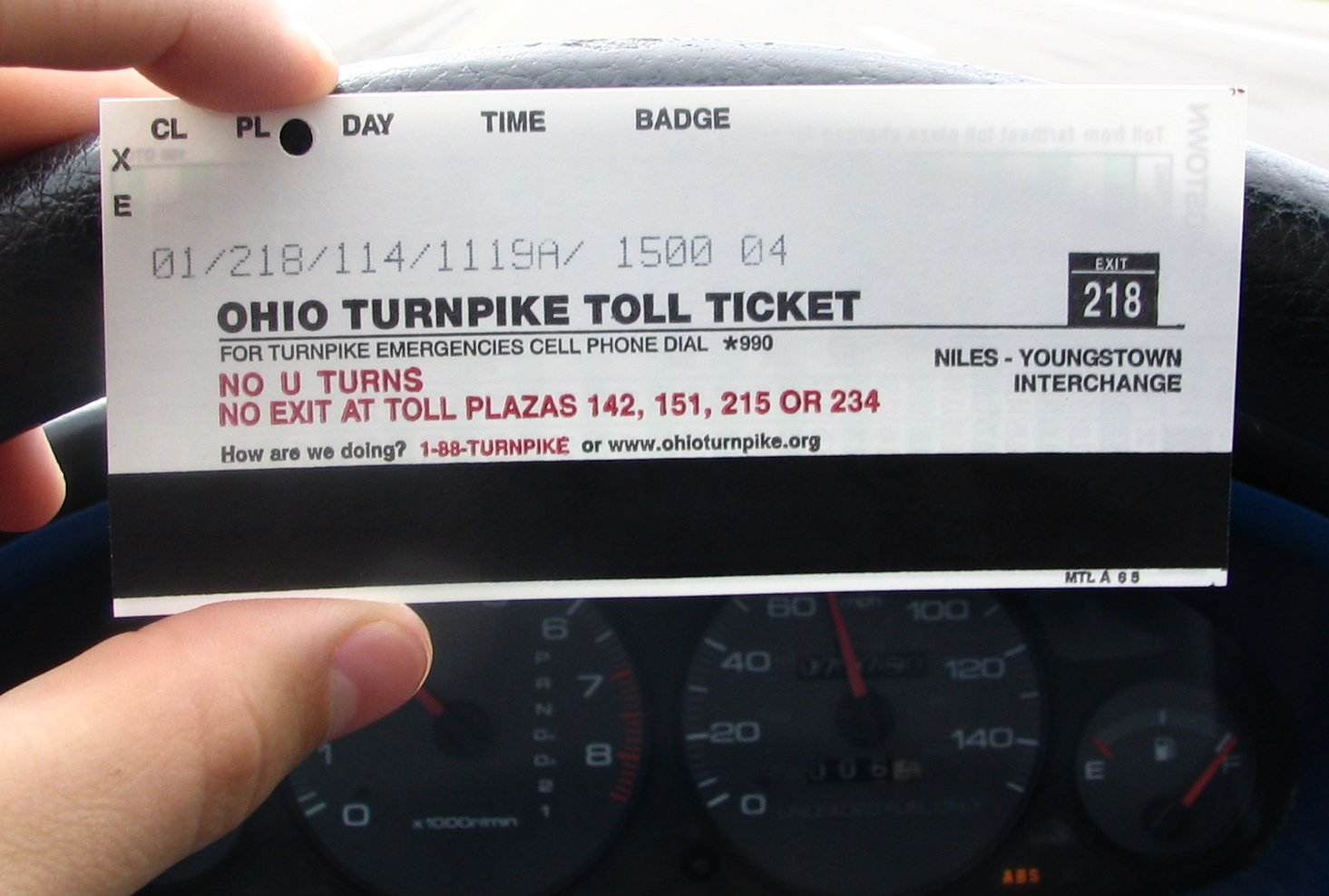
Standard Ohio Turnpike ticket, in this case for a Class 1 vehicle (two-axle car without trailer) entering at exit 218

The Ohio Turnpike uses a ticket and barrier toll system. The Westgate and Eastgate toll plazas charge flat rate tolls, with Westgate charging a toll for a 2-axle vehicle of $3.50 with cash and $2.25 with E-ZPass in both directions, while Eastgate charges a toll of $4.25 with cash and $3 with E-ZPass in the westbound direction only. Between Swanton and Newton Falls, the turnpike uses a ticket system, with tolls calculated based upon the distance traveled as well as the height and axle-count of vehicle driven. As of January 2026, the toll for a 2-axle vehicle to travel between Swanton and Newton Falls is $20 with cash and $13.75 with E-ZPass. There is no toll collection at exits between the Westgate and Swanton barriers, or between the Newton Falls and Eastgate barriers.

In April 2008, Governor Ted Strickland and legislative leaders announced a planned stimulus package that would redistribute Turnpike tolls to road projects throughout the state. On May 23, the Ohio Senate Finance Committee voted to pass a new version of the package which would not involve tolls collected.

== Exit list ==
County	Location	mi	km	Old exit	New exit	Destinations	Notes
Williams	Northwest Township	0.0	0.0			I-80 Toll west / I-90 Toll west / Indiana Toll Road west – Chicago	Continuation into Indiana; western end of I-80/I-90 concurrency
Williams	Northwest Township	2.0	3.2	—	2	SR 49 – Edon, Edgerton	Diamond interchange
Williams	Northwest Township	4.0	6.4	Westgate Toll Barrier			
Williams	Holiday City	13.5	21.7	2	13	SR 15 / US 20A – Bryan, Montpelier	Last westbound exit before toll
Williams	Brady Township	20.8	33.5	Indian Meadow Service Plaza (westbound); Tiffin River Service Plaza (eastbound)			
Fulton	Franklin Township	25.5	41.0	2A	25	SR 66 – Archbold, Fayette	
Fulton	Dover Township	34.9	56.2	3	34	SR 108 – Wauseon	
Fulton	Pike Township	39.8	64.1	3B	39	SR 109 – Delta, Lyons	Last eastbound exit before toll
Lucas	Swanton Township	49.0	78.9	Swanton Toll Barrier (western end of ticket system)			
Lucas	Monclova Township	52.6	84.7	3A	52	SR 2 – Swanton, Toledo Airport	
Lucas	Maumee	59.5	95.8	4	59	US 20 to I-475 / US 23 – Maumee, Toledo, Ann Arbor	
Wood	Rossford	64.9	104.4	4A	64	I-75 – Toledo, Dayton	I-75 exit 195
Wood	Lake Township	71.7	115.4	5	71	I-280 north / SR 420 south – Toledo, Detroit, Stony Ridge	I-280 exit 1A
Ottawa	Harris Township	76.9	123.8	Blue Heron Service Plaza (westbound); Wyandot Service Plaza (eastbound)			
Ottawa	Harris Township	81.8	131.6	5A	81	SR 51 – Elmore, Woodville, Gibsonburg	
Sandusky	Sandusky Township	91.6	147.4	6	91	SR 53 – Fremont, Port Clinton	
Sandusky	Riley Township	100.0	160.9	Erie Islands Service Plaza (westbound); Commodore Perry Service Plaza (eastbound)			
Erie	Groton Township	110.2	177.3	6A	110	SR 4 – Sandusky, Bellevue	
Erie	Milan Township	118.5	190.7	7	118	US 250 – Sandusky, Norwalk	
Lorain	Brownhelm Township	135.9	218.7	7A	135	To SR 2 / Baumhart Road – Vermilion	
Lorain	Amherst Township	139.5	224.5	Middle Ridge Service Plaza (westbound); Vermilion Valley Service Plaza (eastbound)			
Lorain	Amherst Township	140.6	226.3	7B (Note: Only in documents; never signposted)	140	SR 58 – Amherst, Oberlin	
Lorain	Elyria Township	142.8	229.8	8A	142	I-90 east / SR 2 east – Cleveland	Eastbound exit and westbound entrance; eastern end of I-90 concurrency
Lorain	Elyria	145.5	234.2	8	145	SR 57 – Lorain, Elyria	
Lorain	North Ridgeville	151.8	244.3	9A	151	I-480 east – North Ridgeville, Cleveland	Eastbound exit and westbound entrance
Lorain	North Ridgeville	152.2	244.9	9	152	To SR 10 – North Ridgeville, North Olmsted, Fairview Park, Cleveland	Westbound access to I-480
Cuyahoga	Strongsville	161.8	260.4	10	161	I-71 / US 42 – Strongsville, Columbus, Cleveland	I-71 exit 233
Cuyahoga	Broadview Heights	170.1	273.7	Great Lakes Service Plaza (westbound); Towpath Service Plaza (eastbound)			
Summit	Richfield	173.2	278.7	11	173	I-77 / SR 21 – Akron, Cleveland	
Summit	Boston Heights	180.3	290.2	12	180	SR 8 – Akron	
Portage	Streetsboro	187.2	301.3	13	187	I-480 west / SR 14 – Streetsboro	
Portage	Shalersville Township	193.9	312.1	13A	193	SR 44 – Ravenna	
Portage	Freedom Township	197.0	317.0	Portage Service Plaza (westbound); Brady's Leap Service Plaza (eastbound)			
Trumbull	Braceville Township	209.2	336.7	14	209	SR 5 – Warren	
Trumbull	Braceville Township	211.0	339.6	Newton Falls Toll Barrier (eastern end of ticket system)			
Trumbull	Lordstown	215.0	346.0	14A	215	Ellsworth–Bailey Road – Lordstown West	Eastbound exit and westbound entrance
Trumbull	Lordstown	216.4	348.3	14B	216	General Motors Parkway – Lordstown East	Westbound exit and eastbound entrance; to SR 45; last westbound exit before toll
Mahoning	Jackson Township	218.7	352.0	15	218	I-76 west / I-80 east to I-680 south – Akron, Canton, Youngstown, New York City	Eastern end of I-80 concurrency; western end of I-76 concurrency; I-680 not signed westbound
Mahoning	Beaver Township	232.9	374.8	16	232	SR 7 – Youngstown	Last eastbound exit
Mahoning	Beaver Township	234.1	376.7	16A	234	I-680 north – Youngstown, Poland	Westbound exit and eastbound entrance
Mahoning	Springfield Township	237.2	381.7	Mahoning Valley Service Plaza (westbound); Glacier Hills Service Plaza (eastbound)			
Mahoning	Springfield Township	239.1	384.8	Eastgate Toll Barrier (westbound)			
Mahoning	Springfield Township	241.3	388.3			I-76 Toll east / Penna Turnpike east – Pittsburgh	Continuation into Pennsylvania; eastern end of I-76 concurrency
1.000 mi = 1.609 km; 1.000 km = 0.621 mi: Closed/former; Concurrency terminus; Incomplete access; Tolled
