= New Castle, Ohio =

Unincorporated community in Ohio, U.S.

Coordinates: 39°53′30″N 81°4′33″W

New Castle is an unincorporated community in Belmont County, in the U.S. state of Ohio.

== History ==
New Castle was laid out in 1834. An old variant name was Pilcher. A post office called Pilcher was established in 1840, and remained in operation until 1907.
