= West Austintown, Ohio =

Unincorporated community in Ohio, U.S.

Coordinates: 41°5′59″N 80°47′31″W

West Austintown is an unincorporated community in Mahoning County, in the U.S. state of Ohio.

== History ==
West Austintown had its start in 1869 when the railroad was extended to that point. A post office called West Austintown was established in 1872, and remained in operation until 1929.
