= Austintown Log House =

Historic house in Ohio, United States

- U.S. National Register of Historic Places
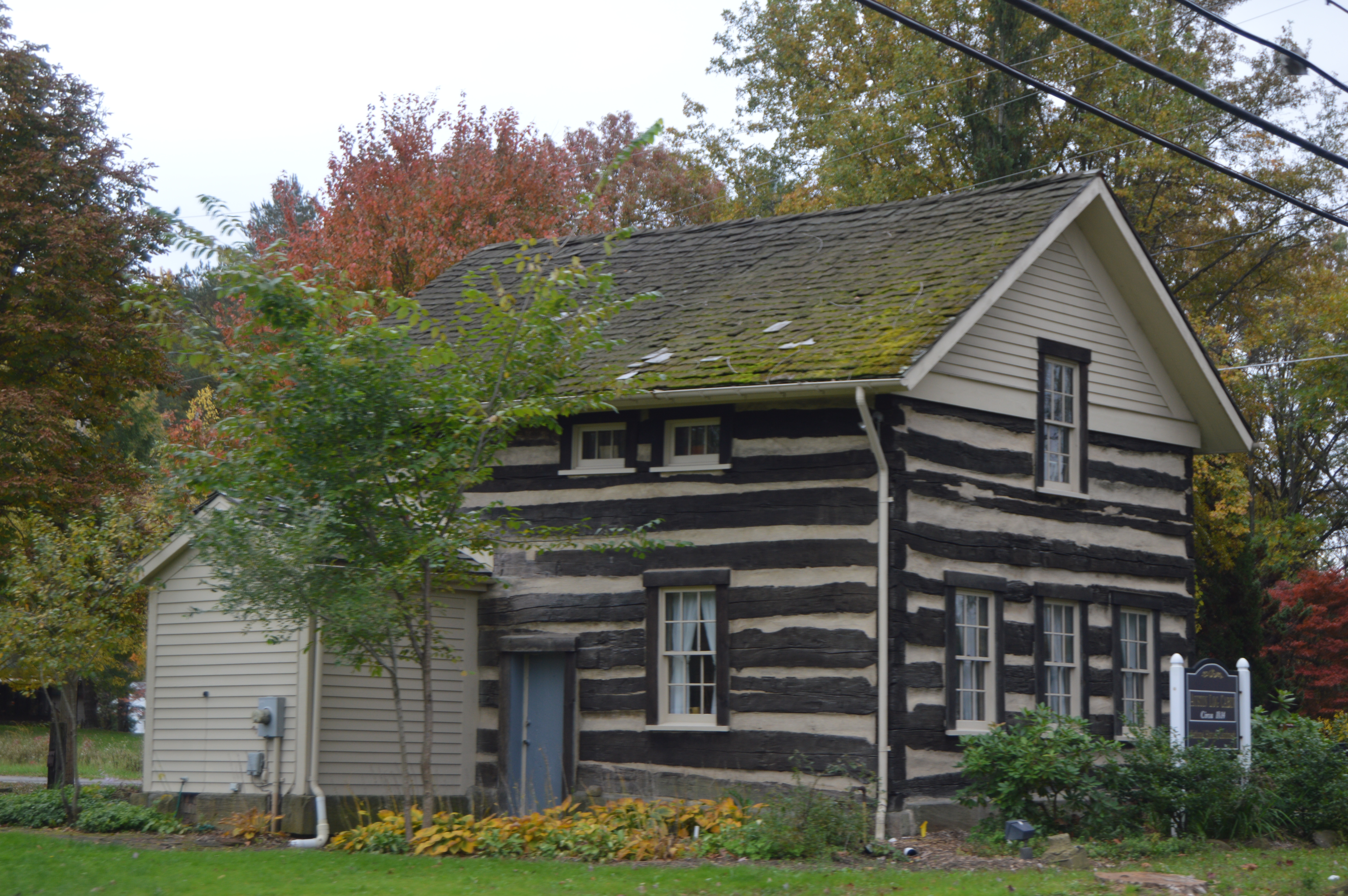

- Location within Ohio Location within the United States
- Nearest city: Youngstown, Ohio
- Coordinates: 41°3′42″N 80°43′56″W
- Built: 1814
- Architectural style: log cabin
- NRHP reference No.: 74001566
- Added to NRHP: 1974-07-30

Austintown Log House is a log cabin near Youngstown, Ohio, United States, listed on the National Register of Historic Places on July 30, 1974. It is managed by the Austintown Historical Society and commonly known as the "Austin Log Cabin".

== Historic uses ==
=== Discovery ===
In 1973, St. Andrew's Episcopal Church, in Austintown Township, Ohio, bought an abandoned house adjacent to the church property. In the process of tearing down the house, log-like beams were discovered. Demolition stopped. Volunteers removed the artificial brick and siding from the structure revealing a two-story log cabin. The steeple notch on the corner logs indicated that the cabin has been built prior to 1824. A deed search was undertaken. This title search revealed that Calvin Austin sold 150.5 acres (0.609 km^{2}) to John Packard on April 29, 1814, for $500.00. Further research indicated that Austintown Township, Ohio, was named for Calvin Austin who was a land agent for the Connecticut Land Company. It was obvious that this priceless treasure must be preserved.

=== Residents ===
The earliest residents of the house were John Harris Packard (listed as one 108 resident heads of household in Austintown in 1820 census) and his second wife, Mary Alfred (or Alford) Barnes Packard. John Harris Packard was born January 30, 1748, in North Bridgewater, Massachusetts. He and his second wife, Mary, and their 10 children migrated to Austintown in 1814. Upon John's death on January 7, 1827, in Austintown, Ohio, the log house and surrounding 120 acres (0.49 km^{2}) were willed to his son, William Packard. On January 14, 1828, deed records indicate a transfer of 30 acres (120,000 m^{2}) from William and Martha Packard to Samuel Dorwat (Dorworth) for $150. Records indicate that in 1829, Dorwat and his wife, Sarah "Ann" Burgett Dorwat, sold 10 acres (40,000 m^{2}) including the house to Henry Lawrence (alternately spelled Lorins) and his wife Polly for $50. In 1845, these 10 acres (40,000 m^{2}) were sold to Abraham Dustman and his wife, Rebecca Mauer Dustman, for $406. The Dustmans lived there with their five children. Dustman was a farmer and is thought to have built the barn that was destroyed in a fire in 1910. In 1850, Dustman sold the property to Henry Wehr and his wife Margaret for $510. Wehr dug the wells and added the hog shed. At some point, Henry sold the property to his nephew, Levi Wehr. In the "Archeology of Log Cabin," Dr. John White describes Levi as “a heavy and secretive drinker” because White found at least 183 whiskey bottles secreted in the foundation of the second barn built by Levi in 1910. Levi and his wife, Emma, raised two daughters in the house. The house was owned in the 1940s by Willard Wesley Stricklin. Stricklin is reported to have dug out the root cellar below the kitchen. The house was occupied from 1948 to 1963 by Joseph Hanko. Hanko dug out cellar under main house and added the small bathroom extension. The house sat vacant from 1964 until 1973 when it was acquired by St. Andrew's Episcopal Church.

=== Preservation ===
The Austintown Community Council worked with members of the community to raise funds for the restoration of the cabin. With the approval of township officials, the group developed an innovative fundraiser which involved standing at the busiest intersection in Austintown and collecting money from drivers in cars stopped at the red light. This, coupled with pennies collected from school children; donations from school PTAs, civic organization, and various church groups; bake sales, book sales, and a flea market yielded $50,000 with which to restore the cabin. While some volunteers were fundraising, other volunteers, under the guidance of an architect knowledgeable in historical preservation, were removing the cabin's roof and replacing it with a wood shake roof, removing interior walls, replacing windows with panes of glass from a 100-year-old school house, and adding a furnace and new plumbing. They sealed the logs with preservatives, and they replaced the chinking with a cement mixture to simulate the original clay, straw, mud and rock chinking. They restored the fireplace using century-old brick and an old barn beam for the mantel. As a result of their efforts, the Austin Log Cabin was designated a National Historic Landmark in 1975. A $2,500 grant from the Ohio American Revolution Bicentennial Commission allowed the dedication of the Austin Log Cabin on July 4, 1976, as Austintown's Bicentennial Project. The Austintown Historical Society was formed on July 21, 1976, for the purpose of maintaining the Austin Log Cabin. It became a 501(c)(3) in 1976 and was incorporated in 1979.

=== Modern status ===
The Austintown Historical Society continues to maintain the Austin Log Cabin and is responsible for the upkeep, utilities, and day-to-day maintenance. It has furnished the Austin Log Cabin through donations of period furnishing including a bed slept in by Frank Ohl, a historical figure in Austintown, a spinning wheel, yarn winder, two primitive tables, and Ohio Bicentennial memorabilia. One room of the Cabin is dedicated to the Bicentennial of the United States and memorabilia of that era. Another upstairs room of the Cabin is outfitted as a one-room school house replete with documents and photos of Austintown's 12 one-room school houses, a coal stove, desks, period books, and yearbooks from Austintown Fitch High School dating from 1917 to the present day. The basement is furnished with antique farm implements. A corn crib, a three-seat outhouse, a smokehouse, various farming implements, and a coal car from one of Austintown's earliest coal mines are located outside. The Austin Log Cabin has served as the site for an Archaeological Dig supervised by the late Dr. John White, professor emeritus of anthropology at Youngstown State University. In addition to the cabin, Dr. White's dig revealed the existence of a multipurpose shed which was at one time used as a chicken coop, a stock well dug in 1860-70 and abandoned by 1930, a chicken house, two outdoor privies—one dug in 1950 and one right before 1950, a barn, a second barn built circa 1910, a hog shed, a house well, a cistern, and a summer house. Relics collected during these digs are displayed throughout the Cabin as is the book, Archaeology of the Log House, produced by Dr. White. The cabin is open for free tours on the first Sunday of every month from March–December from 1-3 and by appointment other times.
