= Girard, Ohio =

- City
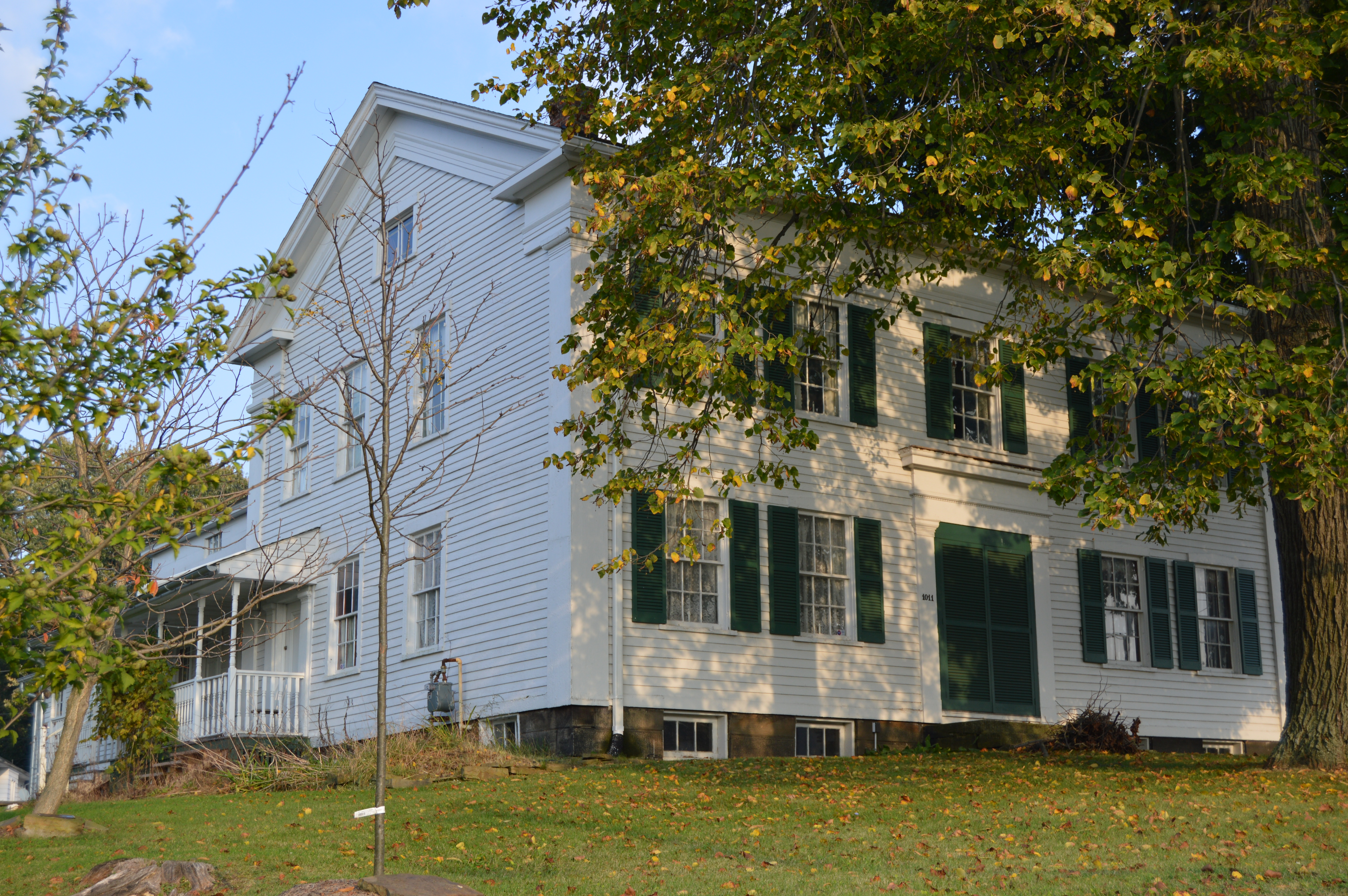
- Henry Barnhisel House
- Interactive map of Girard, Ohio
- Location within Ohio Location within the United States
- Coordinates: 41°09′58″N 80°41′46″W
- Country: United States
- State: Ohio
- County: Trumbull

Government
  - Mayor: Mark Zuppo

Area
  - Total: 6.10 sq mi (15.81 km^{2})
  - Land: 5.64 sq mi (14.61 km^{2})
  - Water: 0.46 sq mi (1.20 km^{2})
- Elevation: 1,001 ft (305 m)

Population (2020)
  - Total: 9,603
  - Estimate (2023): 9,469
  - Density: 1,702.3/sq mi (657.26/km^{2})
- Time zone: UTC-5 (EST)
  - Summer (DST): UTC-4 (EDT)
- ZIP code: 44420
- Area codes: 330, 234
- FIPS code: 39-30198
- GNIS feature ID: 2394903
- Website: http://www.cityofgirard.com/

Girard is a city in southern Trumbull County, Ohio, United States, along the Mahoning River. The population was 9,603 at the 2020 census. Located directly north of Youngstown, it is a suburb in the Youngstown–Warren metropolitan area.

== History ==
It is believed that Girard takes its name from Stephen Girard, a French American philanthropist who was the founder of the Girard Bank and Girard College in Philadelphia. It was first settled in 1800 but remained static until the Ohio and Erie Canal was completed.

== Geography ==
According to the United States Census Bureau, the city has a total area of 6.37 square miles (16.50 km^{2}), of which 5.88 square miles (15.23 km^{2}) is land and 0.49 square miles (1.27 km^{2}) is water.

== Demographics ==
Historical population
Census	Pop.	Note	%±
1900	2,630		—
1910	3,736		42.1%
1920	6,555		75.5%
1930	9,859		50.4%
1940	9,805		−0.5%
1950	10,113		3.1%
1960	12,997		28.5%
1970	14,119		8.6%
1980	12,517		−11.3%
1990	11,304		−9.7%
2000	10,902		−3.6%
2010	9,958		−8.7%
2020	9,603		−3.6%
2023 (est.)	9,469		−1.4%
U.S. Decennial Census; 2018 Estimate

=== 2020 census ===
As of the 2020 census, Girard had a population of 9,603. The median age was 41.1 years. 20.6% of residents were under the age of 18 and 19.8% of residents were 65 years of age or older. For every 100 females there were 91.4 males, and for every 100 females age 18 and over there were 89.9 males age 18 and over.

100.0% of residents lived in urban areas, while 0.0% lived in rural areas.

There were 4,304 households in Girard, of which 25.5% had children under the age of 18 living in them. Of all households, 34.1% were married-couple households, 23.3% were households with a male householder and no spouse or partner present, and 34.6% were households with a female householder and no spouse or partner present. About 37.0% of all households were made up of individuals and 15.8% had someone living alone who was 65 years of age or older.

There were 4,712 housing units, of which 8.7% were vacant. The homeowner vacancy rate was 2.5% and the rental vacancy rate was 9.2%.

Racial composition as of the 2020 census
Race	Number	Percent
White	8,279	86.2%
Black or African American	628	6.5%
American Indian and Alaska Native	30	0.3%
Asian	39	0.4%
Native Hawaiian and Other Pacific Islander	0	0.0%
Some other race	69	0.7%
Two or more races	558	5.8%
Hispanic or Latino (of any race)	320	3.3%

=== 2010 census ===
As of the 2010 census, there were 9,958 people, 4,307 households, and 2,663 families residing in the city. The population density was 1,693.5 inhabitants per square mile (653.9/km^{2}). There were 4,746 housing units at an average density of 807.1 per square mile (311.6/km^{2}). The racial makeup of the city was 93.2% White, 4.0% African American, 0.1% Native American, 0.3% Asian, 0.2% from other races, and 2.2% from two or more races. Hispanic or Latino of any race were 2.1% of the population.

There were 4,307 households, of which 28.6% had children under the age of 18 living with them, 39.9% were married couples living together, 16.4% had a female householder with no husband present, 5.5% had a male householder with no wife present, and 38.2% were non-families. 32.9% of all households were made up of individuals, and 14.1% had someone living alone who was 65 years of age or older. The average household size was 2.31 and the average family size was 2.92.

The median age in the city was 41.8 years. 21.9% of residents were under the age of 18; 8.9% were between the ages of 18 and 24; 23.1% were from 25 to 44; 28.9% were from 45 to 64; and 17.1% were 65 years of age or older. The gender makeup of the city was 46.7% male and 53.3% female.

== Government ==
Girard has a statutory form of government as drawn up by the Ohio Revised Code. It has 7 member City Council, and a Council President, of which all 8 serve 2 year terms and elected by the voters of the city. There are no term limits. Girard's other elected positions are Mayor, Auditor, Law Director and Treasurer, all of which serve 4 year terms, and are without term limits.

== Education ==
Children in Girard are served by the Girard City School District. Girard City Schools are overseen by a 5-member Board of Education chosen by the electorate of the school district to 4 year terms, without term limits. The current schools serving Girard are:

- Prospect Elementary School – grades PK-3; Blue Ribbon School
- Girard Intermediate Middle School – grades 4-6
- Girard Junior High School – grades 7-8
- Girard High School – grades 9-12

In addition, the St. Rose Elementary School is overseen by the Roman Catholic Diocese of Youngstown for children in grades PK-8 as a private option.

== Notable people ==
- Stiv Bators, punk rock musician
- Kathleen Bradley, Barker's Beauties member on The Price Is Right
- George Cappuzzello, Major League Baseball pitcher
- Kenneth J. David, Medal of Honor recipient, 101st Airborne Division, Vietnam
- Delos Drake, Major League Baseball outfielder
- Pat Meyer, National Football League offensive line coach & former player
- Bill Triplett, National Football League running back
- Mel Triplett, National Football League running back
