= National Register of Historic Places listings in Mahoning County, Ohio =

Location of Mahoning County in Ohio

There are 75 properties and districts listed on the National Register of Historic Places in Mahoning County, Ohio, United States, including one National Historic Landmark. Another property was once listed but has been removed. The locations of National Register properties and districts for which the latitude and longitude coordinates are included below, may be seen in an online map.

This National Park Service list is complete through NPS recent listings posted March 27, 2026.

== Current listings ==
	Name on the Register	Image	Date listed	Location	City or town	Description
1	Alliance Clay Product Company	Alliance Clay Product Company	December 8, 1978 (#78002130)	1500 S. Mahoning Ave., east of Alliance; 40°54′13″N 81°04′57″W	Smith Township	
2	Judge William Shaw Anderson House	Judge William Shaw Anderson House	March 17, 1976 (#76001479)	7171 Mahoning Ave. 41°05′55″N 80°48′14″W	Austintown Township	
3	Arlington Avenue District	Arlington Avenue District	August 13, 1974 (#74001565)	304-373 Arlington Ave. 41°06′29″N 80°39′14″W	Youngstown	
4	Austintown Log House	Austintown Log House	July 30, 1974 (#74001566)	West of Youngstown on Raccoon Rd. 41°03′42″N 80°43′56″W	Austintown Township	
5	Baltimore & Ohio Railroad Terminal	Baltimore & Ohio Railroad Terminal	July 10, 1986 (#86001565)	530 Mahoning Ave. 41°06′10″N 80°39′31″W	Youngstown	Served Amtrak's Three Rivers line until March 8, 2005
6	Burt Building	Burt Building	July 2, 2008 (#08000588)	325-327 West Federal St. 41°06′08″N 80°39′15″W	Youngstown	Commercial building with terra cotta facade, constructed ca. 1919. Original owner Harry Burt is credited with inventing the Good Humor Bar at this location.
7	Butler Institute Of American Art	Butler Institute Of American Art	October 29, 1974 (#74001567)	524 Wick Ave. 41°06′20″N 80°38′46″W	Youngstown	
8	Central Tower Building	Central Tower Building	February 8, 1980 (#80003146)	1 Federal Plaza West; 41°06′00″N 80°39′01″W	Youngstown	Designed by Morris Scheibel. Part of "Seven Early Buildings of Central Square" Thematic Resource.
9	City Hall Annex	City Hall Annex	July 23, 1986 (#86001918)	9 W. Front St. 41°05′54″N 80°39′05″W	Youngstown	
10	Crandall Park–Fifth Avenue Historic District	Crandall Park–Fifth Avenue Historic District	March 22, 1990 (#90000474)	Roughly bounded by Tod Ln., Ohio Ave., Redondo Rd., Catallina, and Guadalupe Ave., and 5th Ave. from Gypsy to Fairgreen; 41°07′35″N 80°39′14″W	Youngstown	
11	Damascus Grade School	Damascus Grade School	September 21, 1989 (#89001456)	14923 Morris St. in Damascus; 40°54′09″N 80°57′16″W	Goshen Township	
12	Erie Terminal Building–Commerce Plaza Building	Erie Terminal Building–Commerce Plaza Building	July 23, 1986 (#86001914)	112 W. Commerce St. 41°06′06″N 80°39′00″W	Youngstown	
13	Federal Building	Federal Building	February 8, 1980 (#80003147)	18 N. Phelps St. 41°06′03″N 80°39′03″W	Youngstown	Designed by Daniel Burnham. Part of "Seven Early Buildings of Central Square" Thematic Resource
14	First National Bank Building	First National Bank Building	February 8, 1980 (#80003148)	6 Federal Plaza West; 41°06′02″N 80°39′00″W	Youngstown	Designed by Walker and Weeks. Part of "Seven Early Buildings of Central Square" Thematic Resource.
15	Forest Glen Estates Historic District	Forest Glen Estates Historic District	May 20, 1998 (#98000565)	Roughly bounded by Homestead Dr., Glenwood Ave., Alburn Dr., and Market St. 41°03′15″N 80°40′00″W	Boardman Township	
16	Forest Lawn Memorial Park	Forest Lawn Memorial Park	December 18, 2018 (#100003244)	5400 Market St. 41°02′35″N 80°39′49″W	Boardman Township	
17	Gallagher Building	Gallagher Building	June 9, 2014 (#14000295)	23 N. Hazel and 131 Commerce Sts. 41°06′06″N 80°39′04″W	Youngstown	
18	Helen Chapel	Helen Chapel	July 23, 1986 (#86001923)	Northwestern corner of E. Wood and Champion Sts. 41°06′06″N 80°38′49″W	Youngstown	
19	Hopewell Furnace Site	Hopewell Furnace Site	November 10, 1975 (#75001481)	Along Yellow Creek below Lake Hamilton, northeast of the Lake Hamilton Dam; 41°02′14″N 80°35′26″W	Poland Township	The first blast furnace west of the Appalachians and the first industrial operation in the Connecticut Western Reserve; also an archeological site
20	Idora Park	Idora Park	September 13, 1993 (#93000895)	Southeast of the junction of McFarland and Parkview Aves. 41°04′20″N 80°41′06″W	Youngstown	Park was demolished and has been vacant land since 2001. Wooden carousel was relocated to Brooklyn, NY, in 1984.
21	Jay's Lunch	Jay's Lunch	July 23, 1986 (#86001925)	258 Federal Plaza West; 41°06′06″N 80°39′11″W	Youngstown	
22	Jones Hall, Youngstown State University	Jones Hall, Youngstown State University	October 18, 1984 (#84000151)	410 Wick Ave. 41°06′14″N 80°38′47″W	Youngstown	
23	Jared P. Kirtland House	Jared P. Kirtland House	May 13, 1976 (#76001481)	113 W. McKinley Way; 41°01′26″N 80°37′06″W	Poland	
24	Kress Building	Kress Building	July 23, 1986 (#86001926)	111-121 Federal Plaza West; 41°06′02″N 80°39′04″W	Youngstown	Local outpost of Samuel H. Kress' 5-, 10-, and 25-cent store chain. Demolished in 2014.
25	Lake Hamilton Dam	Lake Hamilton Dam	May 7, 1984 (#84003774)	1.5 miles (2.4 km) northeast of Poland off State Route 616; 41°02′13″N 80°35′31″W	Poland Township	
26	Lanterman Mill	Lanterman Mill	July 10, 1974 (#74001568)	Canfield Rd. (U.S. Route 62) in Mill Creek Park; 41°04′00″N 80°40′56″W	Youngstown	
27	Legal Arts Centre		February 12, 2024 (#100009920)	101 Market Street; 41°05′56″N 80°39′00″W	Youngstown	
28	Liberty Theatre	Liberty Theatre	February 9, 1984 (#84003776)	142 Federal Plaza West; 41°06′05″N 80°39′05″W	Youngstown	
29	Lowellville Railroad Station	Lowellville Railroad Station	July 30, 1976 (#76001480)	Along the former Penn Central Railroad line 41°02′07″N 80°32′14″W	Lowellville	
30	Mahoning County Courthouse	Mahoning County Courthouse	August 13, 1974 (#74001569)	120 Market St. 41°05′56″N 80°39′03″W	Youngstown	Designed by local architect Charles Henry Owsley.
31	Mahoning National Bank Building	Mahoning National Bank Building	February 8, 1980 (#80003149)	23 Federal Plaza West; 41°05′58″N 80°39′01″W	Youngstown	Designed by Albert Kahn. Part of "Seven Early Buildings of Central Square" Thematic Resource.
32	Maple–Dell	Maple–Dell	December 20, 1990 (#90001821)	14737 Garfield Rd., northwest of Salem; 40°54′46″N 80°55′39″W	Goshen Township	
33	Masonic Temple	Masonic Temple	June 13, 1997 (#86003830)	223-227 Wick Ave. 41°06′08″N 80°38′50″W	Youngstown	
34	McCrory Building	McCrory Building	July 23, 1986 (#86001928)	9-13 Federal Plaza West and 17-19 Central Sq. 41°06′00″N 80°38′08″W	Youngstown	White terra cotta facaded commercial building.
35	William H. McGuffey Boyhood Home Site	William H. McGuffey Boyhood Home Site	October 15, 1966 (#66000617)	McGuffey Rd., near State Route 616; 41°06′57″N 80°33′31″W	Coitsville Township	
36	McKelvey–Higbee Co. Buildings	McKelvey–Higbee Co. Buildings	July 23, 1986 (#86001930)	210-226 Federal Plaza West and 18-26 N. Hazel St. 41°06′06″N 80°39′07″W	Youngstown	Department store, demolished
37	Reuben McMillan Free Library	Reuben McMillan Free Library	March 27, 1986 (#86000526)	305 Wick Ave. 41°06′11″N 80°38′47″W	Youngstown	
38	Mill Creek Park Historic District	Mill Creek Park Historic District	March 15, 2005 (#05000178)	Mahoning Ave. to Boardman-Canfield Rd., Mill Creek, 960 Bears Den Rd. 41°03′28″N 80°38′46″W	Boardman Township and Youngstown	
39	Mill Creek Park Suspension Bridge	Mill Creek Park Suspension Bridge	October 29, 1976 (#76001482)	Mill Creek Park; 41°04′24″N 80°41′21″W	Youngstown	
40	Conrad Neff House	Conrad Neff House	October 9, 1974 (#74001561)	3967 Boardman-Canfield Rd., east of Canfield; 41°01′28″N 80°43′14″W	Canfield Township	
41	Newport Village Allotment Historic District	Newport Village Allotment Historic District	June 9, 2006 (#06000483)	Parts of Market St., Chester Dr., Jennette Dr., and Overhill Rd. 41°03′25″N 80°39′52″W	Boardman Township	
42	Judge Eben Newton House	Judge Eben Newton House	July 18, 1974 (#74001562)	105 N. Broad St. 41°01′39″N 80°45′37″W	Canfield	
43	Ohio One–Ohio Edison	Ohio One–Ohio Edison	July 23, 1986 (#86001931)	25 E. Boardman and 102-112 S. Champion; 41°05′55″N 80°38′58″W	Youngstown	
44	Old Mahoning County Courthouse	Old Mahoning County Courthouse	October 7, 1974 (#74001563)	7 Court St. 41°01′18″N 80°45′40″W	Canfield	
45	Our Lady of Mount Carmel Church	Our Lady of Mount Carmel Church	May 10, 1979 (#79001893)	Off State Route 289; 41°05′59″N 80°38′31″W	Youngstown	
46	Peggy Ann Building	Peggy Ann Building	July 23, 1986 (#86001937)	101 Federal Plaza West and 2-10 S. Phelps; 41°06′00″N 80°39′03″W	Youngstown	
47	Poland Center School	Poland Center School	May 31, 1984 (#84003779)	U.S. Route 224 and Struthers Rd. at Poland Center; 41°01′25″N 80°34′01″W	Poland Township	
48	Rayen School	Rayen School	October 22, 1974 (#74001570)	222 Wick Ave. 41°06′09″N 80°38′52″W	Youngstown	Public school building founded by Judge William Rayen.
49	Realty Building	Realty Building	February 8, 1980 (#80003150)	47 Federal Plaza; 41°05′58″N 80°38′57″W	Youngstown	Designed by local architects Morris Scheibel and Edgar Stanley. Part of "Seven Early Buildings of Central Square" Thematic Resource. Demolished after the Realty Building explosion in 2024.
50	George J. Renner Jr. House	George J. Renner Jr. House	October 8, 1976 (#76001483)	277 Park Ave. 41°06′47″N 80°38′58″W	Youngstown	
51	Republic Iron and Steel Office Building	Republic Iron and Steel Office Building	July 23, 1986 (#86001940)	415 S. Market St. 41°05′48″N 80°39′05″W	Youngstown	
52	Charles Ruggles House	Charles Ruggles House	August 1, 1975 (#75001480)	17 Court St. 41°01′19″N 80°45′42″W	Canfield	
53	St. James Episcopal Church	St. James Episcopal Church	June 20, 1979 (#79001892)	375 Boardman-Poland Rd. 41°01′24″N 80°38′59″W	Boardman Township	
54	St. John's Episcopal Church	St. John's Episcopal Church	February 3, 2012 (#11001093)	323 Wick Ave. 41°06′13″N 80°38′46″W	Youngstown	
55	Schulte-United Building-G.C. Murphy's Building		January 25, 2024 (#100009324)	27 West Federal St. 41°06′02″N 80°39′02″W	Youngstown	
56	Frank Sebring House	Frank Sebring House	September 21, 1989 (#88000545)	385 W. Ohio Ave. 40°55′22″N 81°01′30″W	Sebring	
57	South Main Street District	South Main Street District	October 1, 1974 (#74001564)	Both sides of S. Main St.; also 101 and 111 S. Main St. 41°01′16″N 80°36′32″W	Poland	Second set of addresses represents a boundary increase of October 18, 1984
58	Southern Park Stable	Southern Park Stable	July 10, 1986 (#86001564)	126 Washington Boulevard; 41°00′04″N 80°39′28″W	Boardman Township	
59	Stambaugh Building	Stambaugh Building	February 8, 1980 (#80003151)	44 Federal Plaza; 41°05′59″N 80°38′56″W	Youngstown	Designed by Albert Kahn. Part of "Seven Early Buildings of Central Square" Thematic Resource.
60	Henry H. Stambaugh Memorial Auditorium	Henry H. Stambaugh Memorial Auditorium	February 9, 1984 (#84003781)	1000 5th Ave. 41°06′49″N 80°39′07″W	Youngstown	Beaux-Arts auditorium designed by Helme & Corbett in 1926.
61	State Theater	State Theater	July 23, 1986 (#86001942)	213 Federal Plaza West; 41°06′04″N 80°39′08″W	Youngstown	
62	Strouss–Hirschberg Company	Strouss–Hirschberg Company	July 23, 1986 (#86001944)	14-28 Federal Plaza West; 41°06′02″N 80°39′01″W	Youngstown	
63	Tod Homestead Cemetery Gate	Tod Homestead Cemetery Gate	October 22, 1976 (#76001484)	Belmont Ave. 41°07′43″N 80°39′57″W	Youngstown	
64	Daniel Vaughn Homestead	Daniel Vaughn Homestead	July 18, 1980 (#80003145)	694 Pine Dr., west of Lake Milton; 41°06′04″N 80°59′07″W	Milton Township	
65	Warner Theater	Warner Theater	May 31, 1980 (#80003152)	260 Federal Plaza West; 41°06′07″N 80°39′12″W	Youngstown	Now the Powers Auditorium at the DeYors Center
66	Wells Building	Wells Building	July 23, 1986 (#86001946)	201-205 Federal Plaza West; 41°06′03″N 80°39′08″W	Youngstown	
67	Welsh Congregational Church	Welsh Congregational Church	July 23, 1986 (#86001947)	220 N. Elm St. 41°06′14″N 80°39′04″W	Youngstown	
68	West Federal Street Young Men's Christian Association		April 10, 2025 (#100011621)	962 Martin Luther King. Blvd; 41°06′39″N 80°39′53″W	Youngstown	
69	White Bridge	White Bridge	December 11, 1983 (#83004319)	Over Yellow Creek, 0.07 miles east of State Route 616; 41°01′39″N 80°36′33″W	Poland	
70	Wick Avenue Historic District	Wick Avenue Historic District	November 20, 1974 (#74001571)	Bounded by Wick, Bryson, expressway, Spring, and Wick Oval; 41°06′24″N 80°38′40″W	Youngstown	
71	Wick Building	Wick Building	February 8, 1980 (#80003153)	34 Federal Plaza West; 41°06′03″N 80°39′01″W	Youngstown	Designed by Daniel Burnham. Part of "Seven Early Buildings of Central Square" Thematic Resource.
72	Wick Park Historic District	Wick Park Historic District	April 5, 1990 (#90000601)	Roughly bounded by 5th and Elm Aves., Elm St. and Broadway; also roughly bounded by Broadway Ave., Wick Ave., Madison Ave., and Elm St. 41°06′54″N 80°38′53″W	Youngstown	Second set of boundaries represents a boundary increase of September 24, 2001
73	Youngstown Foundry and Machine East Boardman Works		August 15, 2024 (#100010679)	365 E. Boardman Street; 41°05′48″N 80°38′38″W	Youngstown	
74	Youngstown Sheet and Tube Company Housing	Youngstown Sheet and Tube Company Housing	June 1, 1982 (#82003611)	Jackson and Chambers St. 41°04′09″N 80°35′09″W	Campbell	
75	YWCA Building	YWCA Building	July 23, 1986 (#86001949)	25 W. Rayen Ave. 41°06′13″N 80°38′55″W	Youngstown	

== Former listing ==
	Name on the Register	Image	Date listed	Date removed	Location	City or town	Description
1	Idora Park Merry-Go-Round	Idora Park Merry-Go-Round	February 6, 1975 (#75001482)	October 29, 1985	Idora Park on Canfield Rd.	Youngstown	Wooden carousel designed by Daniel C. Muller, built in 1899. Formerly located at Idora Park on Canfield Rd., Youngstown, bought and moved to Brooklyn, New York in 1984.

== See also ==
- List of National Historic Landmarks in Ohio
- Listings in neighboring counties: Columbiana, Lawrence (PA), Mercer (PA), Portage, Stark, Trumbull
- National Register of Historic Places listings in Ohio
