= Welsh Congregational Church =

- U.S. National Register of Historic Places
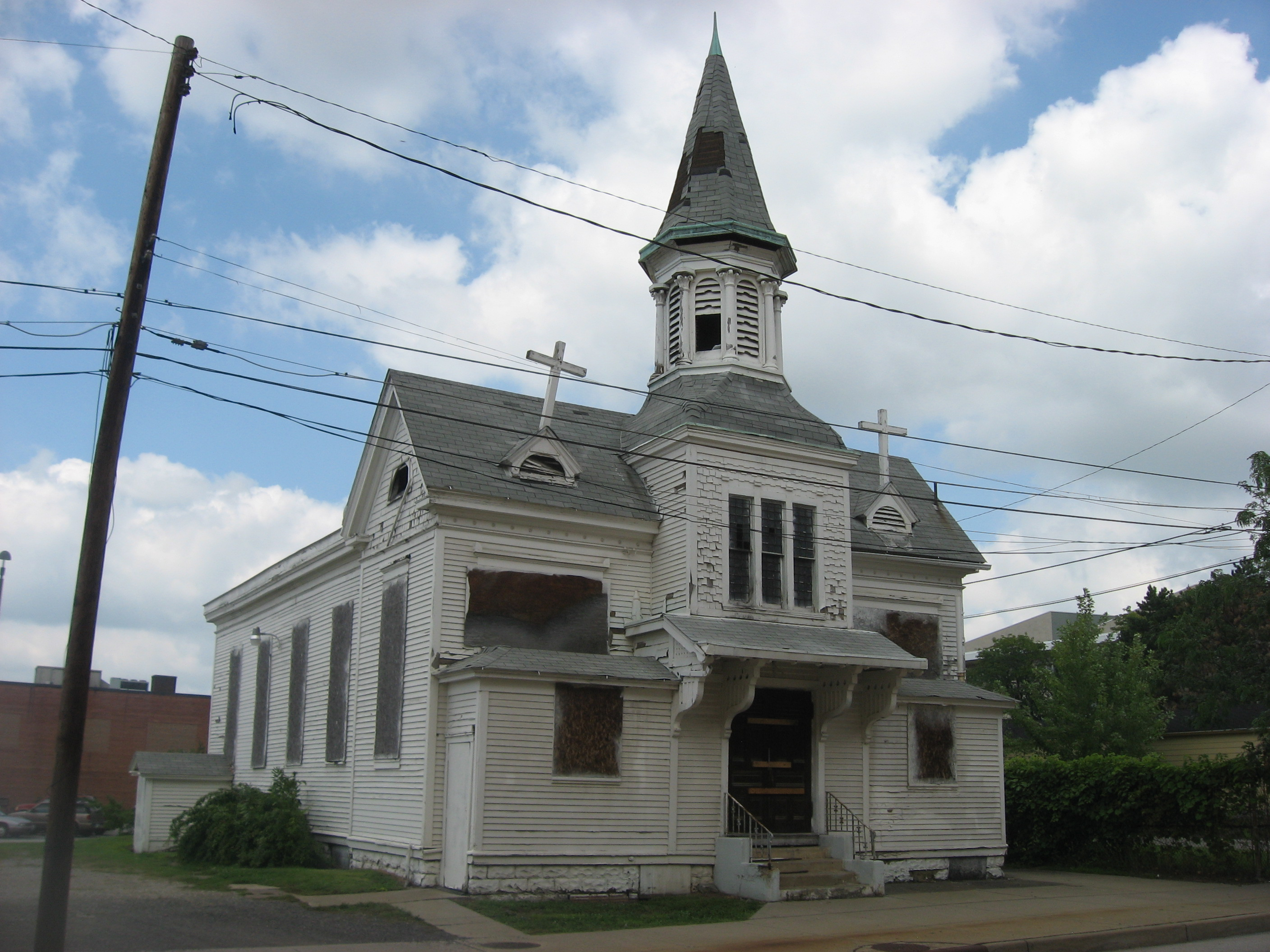
- Front and southern side in 2014

- Location within Ohio Location within the United States
- Location: 220 North Elm Street, Youngstown, Ohio, US
- Coordinates: 41°6′14″N 80°39′4″W
- Area: Less than 1 acre (0.40 ha)
- Built: 1861
- Architectural style: Greek Revival, Queen Anne
- Demolished: April 28, 2022
- MPS: Downtown Youngstown MRA
- NRHP reference No.: 86001947
- Added to NRHP: July 23, 1986

The Welsh Congregational Church was a historic church in Youngstown, Ohio, United States. Built in 1861 by Youngstown's Welsh American community, it was once the center of Welsh life in Youngstown, and was listed on the National Register of Historic Places. Despite efforts to preserve the church, the Roman Catholic Diocese of Youngstown demolished it in 2022 after decades of abandonment.

During the middle and late nineteenth century, Youngstown began to develop as an industrial powerhouse, and its population expanded with the arrival of thousands of Western European immigrants. The largest ethnic group was Welsh, many of whom came to work in coal mines at Brier Hill, west of the city. Some of the Welshmen founded a Congregational church at Brier Hill in 1845, but significant growth prompted the members to construct a new building in Youngstown itself, near downtown, in 1861. This building, the present structure, soon became an ethnic community center as well as a house of worship. Major reconstruction was performed on the building in 1887, completely changing its architectural style. Few other alterations were made over the next century, and by the 1980s, it was Youngstown's oldest church and the only frame house of worship without recent modifications.

One and a half stories tall, the church was composed of weatherboarded and shingled walls and an asbestos roof, set upon a stone foundation. It was originally a Greek Revival structure, although the Queen Anne style has dominated since 1887. The floor plan was vaguely cruciform, with the arms placed so near the street that they appear to form the facade, and the top of the cross protrudes only a slight distance from the arms. All sections were gable-roofed. Small dormer windows were placed in the arm roofs, and a polygonal tower with a steep roof sat atop the facade.

In 1986, the Welsh Congregational Church was listed on the National Register of Historic Places, qualifying both because of its historically significant architecture and because of its place in community history. It was part of a multiple property submission of downtown-area buildings, along with numerous commercial buildings, the Masonic Temple, and First Presbyterian Church. By this time, it was no longer occupied by its original owners, having become home instead to the Messiah Holiness Church.

By the late 2010s, the church had been left in a state of disrepair. Many efforts were made by locals to relocate the church to nearby sites such as Wick Park and "The Wedge" in downtown, however these efforts ultimately failed. Discouraged by the lengthy timeline of relocation and renovation plans, the Catholic Diocese of Youngstown decided to have the building demolished. On April 28, 2022, the church was demolished after standing for 161 years.
