= Metropolitan Tower =

Metropolitan Tower may refer to one of the following buildings:

- Metropolitan Tower (Chicago), Chicago, Illinois, United States
- Metropolitan Tower (New York), New York City, New York, United States
- Metropolitan Tower (Youngstown), Youngstown, Ohio, United States
- Metropolitan Life Insurance Company Tower, New York City
