= Realty Building explosion =

2024 fatal building explosion in a downtown area

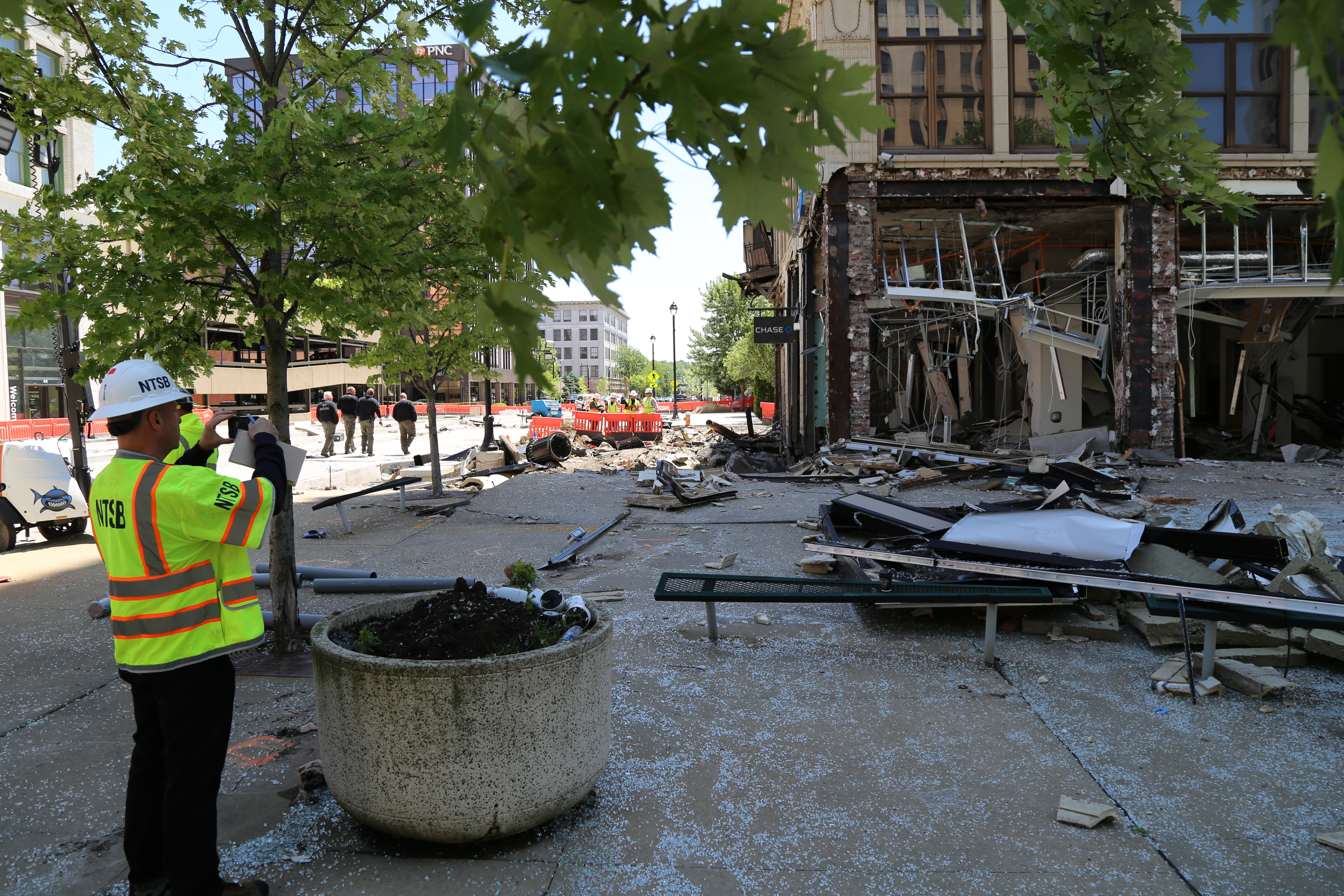
- Date: May 28, 2024
- Time: 2:45 p.m. (EDT)
- Location: Youngstown, Ohio, US; 41.09964°N 80.64902°W
- Cause: Gas leak
- Deaths: 1
- Injuries: 7

On May 28, 2024, a large and powerful explosion destroyed most of the first floor of the Realty Building in the downtown district of Youngstown, Ohio, US, and severely damaged the floors above it, killing one bank employee (Akil Drake, 27) and injuring seven. The explosion was determined to have been caused by a natural gas leak.

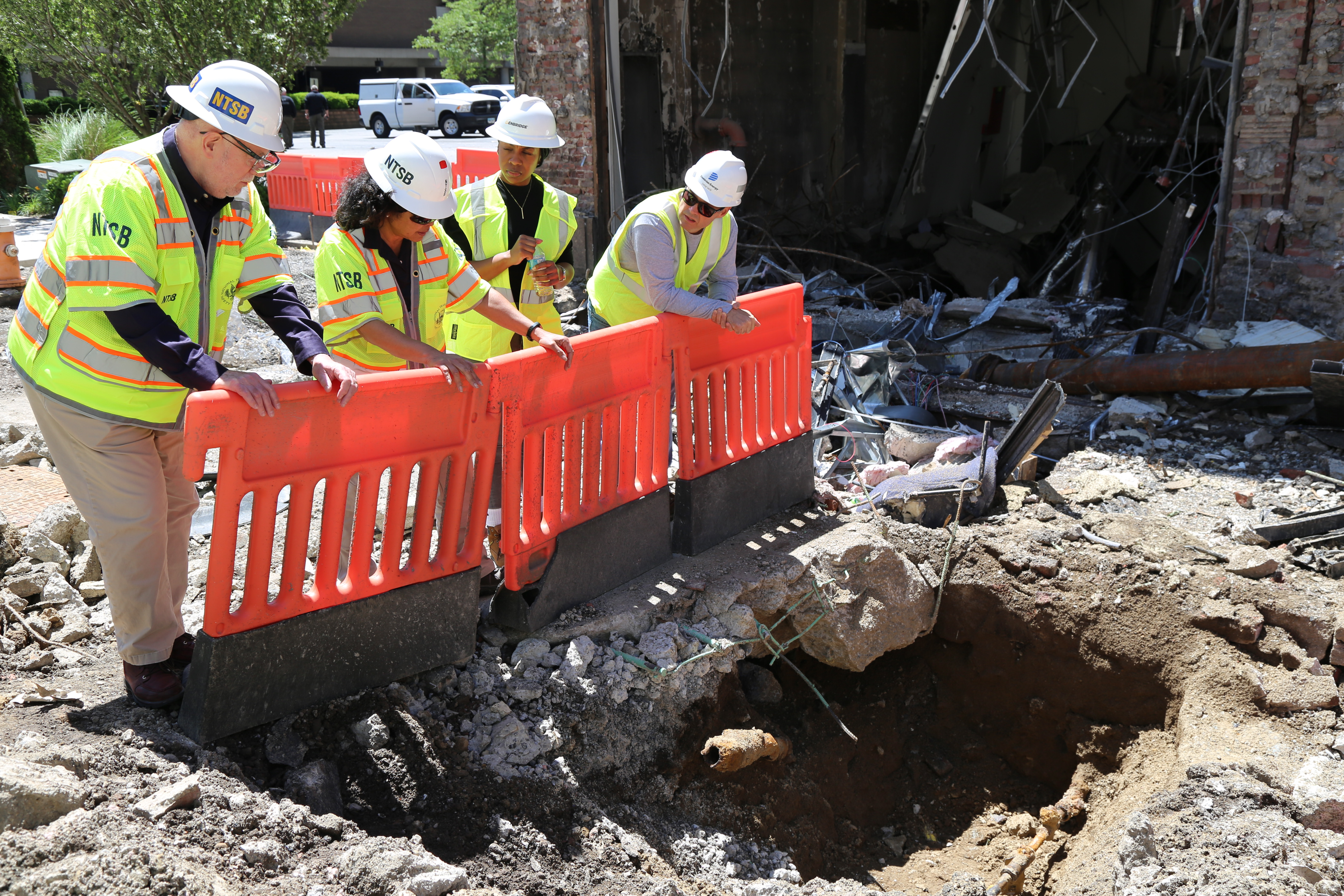
National Transportation Safety Board (NTSB) investigators walk the scene of the May 28 natural gas explosion in downtown Youngstown, Ohio on May 30, 2024.

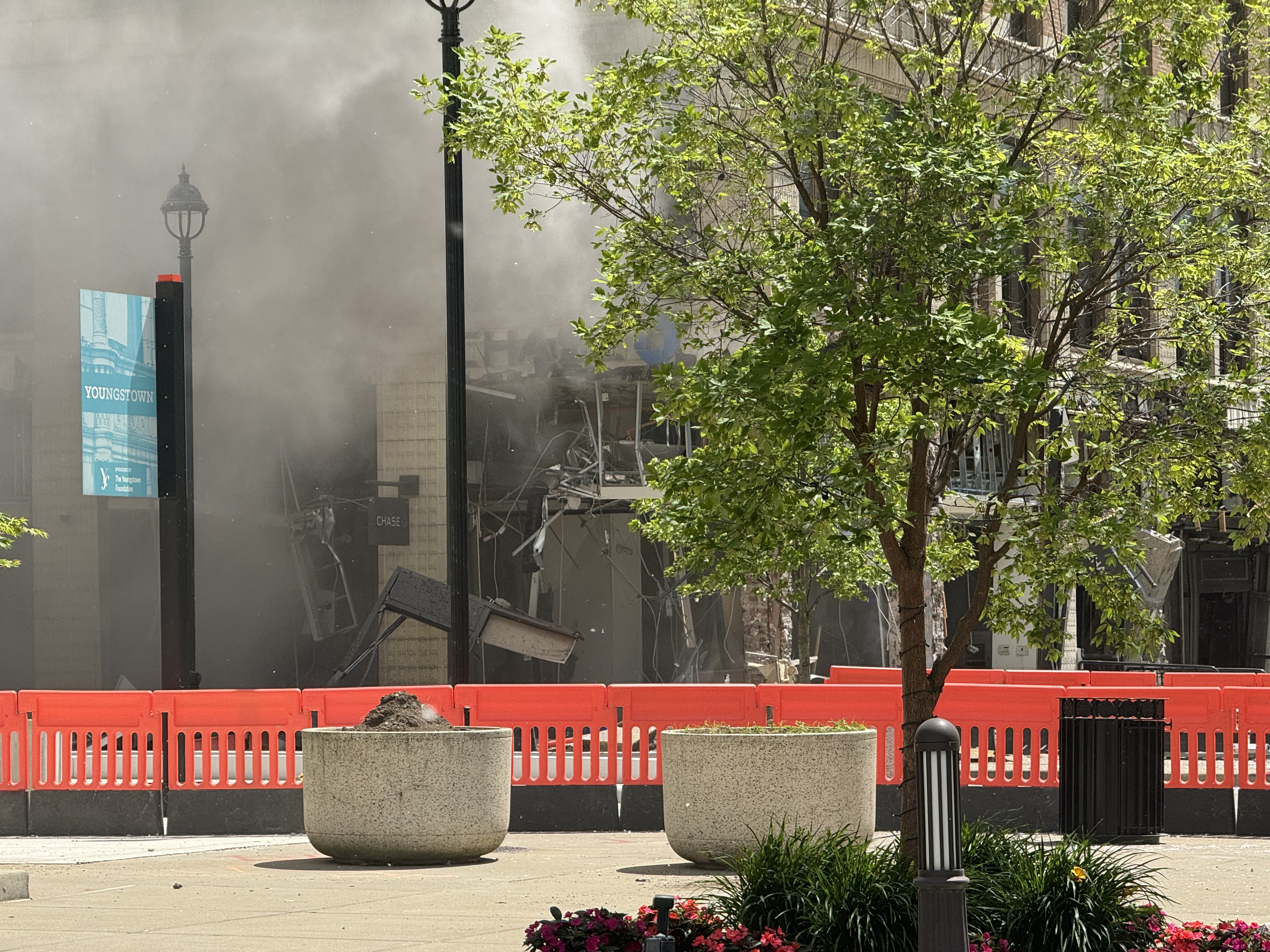
Image captured by videographer Ron Flaviano seconds after the explosion in Downtown Youngstown, Ohio on Tuesday, May 28, 2024 illustrates the complete destruction of the Chase Bank on the lower level of the Realty Building.

== Background ==
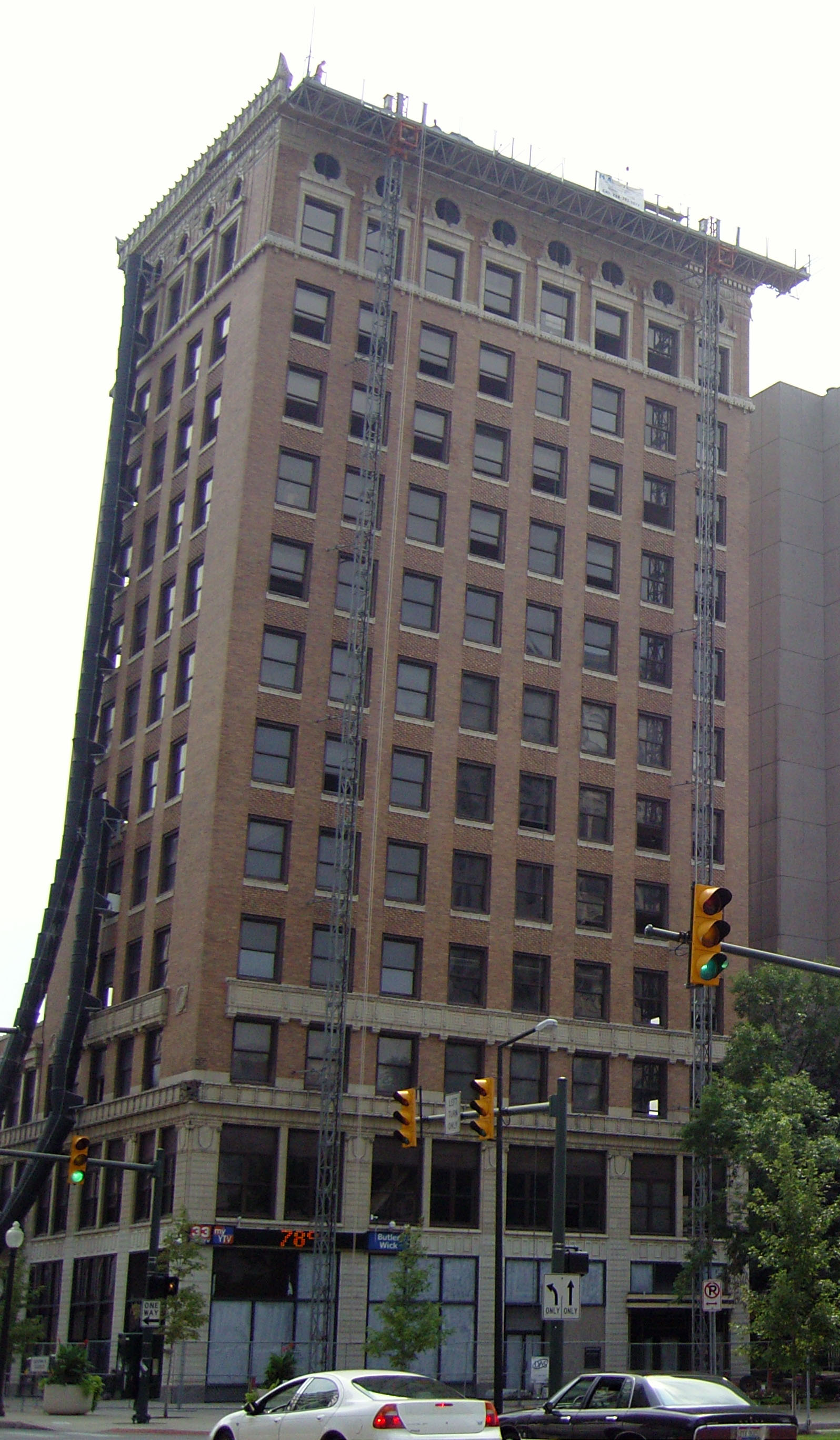
The Realty Building in 2008

The Realty Building was constructed in 1924 for the Realty Guarantee and Trust Company, and was designed by architect Morris W. Scheibel. In 1955, gale-force winds severely damaged and tore the roof off of the building, requiring $50,000 to repair. In 2009, the building was renovated into a 23-unit apartment complex. It is listed on the National Register of Historic Places.

On the day of the explosion, Greenheart Companies workers approved by the Youngstown Board of Control were present in the basement to clear debris, piping, and old utility lines for water, gas, electrical, data, and phone lines. They made three cuts onto a pipeline on the basement wall, with the third cut believed to have caused a gas leak six minutes prior to the explosion. After evacuating the basement, the crew immediately pulled the fire alarm, alerted the Chase Bank on the first floor, called 911, and tried to evacuate residents.

== Explosion ==
On May 28, 2024, at 2:45 p.m. EDT (18:45 UTC), a large explosion occurred at the base of the building, destroying the façade, throwing glass, brick, and other debris onto the sidewalk, caused the downtown area of Youngstown to rumble, and causing the first floor housing a Chase Bank to collapse into the basement. The explosion killed 27-year-old bank employee Akil Drake, who was found deceased in the basement. The explosion also injured seven people who were taken to Mercy Health Hospital, with one person in critical condition.

A security camera video taken inside the 12th floor of the building showed fire alarms going off and residents evacuating before the explosion occurred, which blew out walls and caused significant damage inside the elevator lobby.

Workers who were in the basement prior to the explosion played a significant role in evacuating several residents in the building after the explosion.

== Aftermath ==
Following the explosion, Youngstown city officials restricted access to the building due to the explosion possibly compromising its structural integrity. They hired consultant engineers Barber and Hoffman to collaborate with the building's owners and insurers on investigating the building to assess its safety and whether the building can be repaired or if it needs to be demolished. National Transportation Safety Board investigators were not able to access the building to investigate and collect evidence of what caused the blast until the structural integrity of the building was finished being assessed.

A celebration of life service was held for Akil Drake on June 7 and June 8.

Starbucks in Austintown partnered with the United Way of Youngstown and the Mahoning Valley to collect donations and essential items for those displaced by the explosion. The OH WOW! Children's Museum scheduled announced a community event for June 29 to aid collection for United Way and to make "thank you" cards for first responders.

On June 17, it was announced that due to structural instability, the Realty Building will be demolished.

== See also ==
- 2025 Taichung Shin Kong Mitsukoshi gas explosion
- 2019 Durham gas explosion
- 2015 East Village gas explosion
- 2014 East Harlem gas explosion
- Cleveland East Ohio Gas explosion
- List of explosions
