= Ralph Palmer Agnew =

American mathematician

- Born: December 29, 1900; Poland, Ohio, United States
- Died: October 16, 1986 (aged 85)

Academic background
- Education: Allegheny College (AB) Iowa State College (MS) Cornell University (PhD 1930)

Academic work
- Discipline: Mathematics
- Sub-discipline: Summability, probability theory
- Institutions: Cornell University

Ralph Palmer Agnew (December 29, 1900 – October 16, 1986) was an American mathematician. His research concerned summability of series; he also wrote textbooks on calculus and differential equations.

== Biography ==
Agnew was born in Poland, Ohio, and did his undergraduate studies at Allegheny College. After completing a master's degree at Iowa State College he moved to Cornell University, where he received a Ph.D. in 1930. He was appointed to the Cornell faculty in 1931. He chaired the mathematics department at Cornell from 1940 to 1950, and was responsible for bringing William Feller and Mark Kac to Cornell. He died in 1986.

== Research ==
=== Summability ===
In 1932, Agnew studied the notion of a "deferred Cesàro mean", which is a variant of a Cesàro mean in which the transformed sequence is of the form $D_n = \frac{s_{p_n + 1} + s_{p_n + 2} + \cdots + s_{q_n}}{q_n - p_n}$. In particular, he found that it was consistent with the Cesàro mean if the sequence $p_n/(q_n - p_n)$ is bounded.

In 1949, Agnew proved the following theorem relating the partial sums of a sequence to its Abel transform:
$${\lim\sup}_{t\to 1^-}|\sum_{k=1}^{\infty} t^ku_k - \sum_{k=1}^{[q/\log t^{-1}]} u_k|\leq A(q)\lim\sup |nu_n|.$$

=== Probability ===
In 1954, Agnew studied strengthening the central limit theorem. In particular, let $\xi_i$ denotes independent and identically distributed random variables with mean 0 and standard deviation 1, let $F_n(x)$ denote the cumulative distribution function (CDF) of the sum $\frac{\xi_1 + \cdots + \xi_n}{\sqrt{n}}$, and let $\Phi(x)$ denote the standard normal CDF. Then the central limit theorem says that $F_n(x)\to\Phi(x)$ for all values of x; Agnew proved the stronger result that the integral $\int_{-\infty}^{\infty} |F_n(x) - \Phi(x)|^p dx$ converges to zero for all values of p greater than one half. In 1956, he went on to estimate this integral when p = 2 in the case of the symmetric binomial distribution (where each term is +1 or -1 with equal probability) and in the case of each term following a continuous uniform distribution. In the former case, the integral is on the order of $1/n$; in the latter case, it converges faster, on the order of $1/n^2$.

== Textbooks ==
One well-known example for dealing with a system of elementary differential equations attributed to Agnew is the "snow plow problem", which is stated as:

It starts snowing in the morning and continues heavily and steadily throughout the day. A snow-plow starts plowing at noon and plows 2 miles in the first hour, and 1 mile in the second. What time did it start snowing?

The problem is deceptive for its paucity of information, and requires several common sense assumptions such as the instantaneous velocity of the plow is proportional to the depth of snow immediately in front of it, and there is no maximum or limiting velocity. These are arbitrary, but bear a particular relationship to each other. In the end, they cancel out of the equation and do not appear in the solution, which is a fixed time of day.

His textbook on differential equations also contains a rather humorous note on the difficulty of converting a Laplace equation directly from Rectangular (Cartesian) coordinates to Spherical coordinates:

Doing this can make you forget your troubles the next time you have a toothache at an airport and are informed that your plane is 3 hours late.
