= Poland, Ohio =

- Village
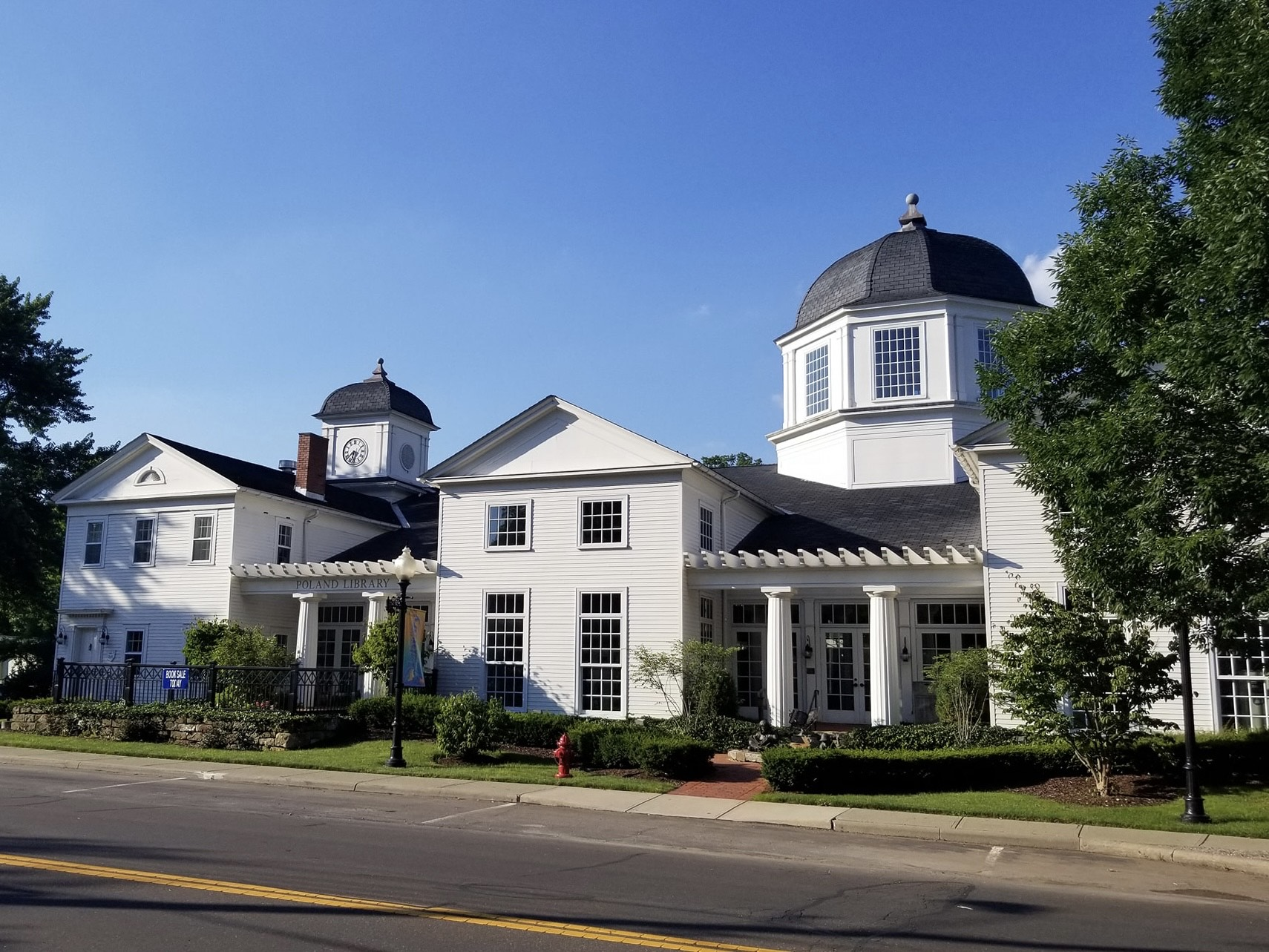
- Poland Library
- Interactive map of Poland, Ohio
- Location within Ohio Location within the United States
- Coordinates: 41°01′09″N 80°37′24″W
- Country: United States
- State: Ohio
- County: Mahoning
- Founded: 1798
- Incorporated: 1866

Government
  - Type: Mayor-council

Area
  - Total: 1.66 sq mi (4.29 km^{2})
  - Land: 1.63 sq mi (4.23 km^{2})
  - Water: 0.023 sq mi (0.06 km^{2})
- Elevation: 1,040 ft (320 m)

Population (2020)
  - Total: 2,463
  - Density: 1,507.0/sq mi (581.85/km^{2})
- Time zone: UTC-5 (Eastern (EST))
  - Summer (DST): UTC-4 (EDT)
- ZIP code: 44514
- Area codes: 234/330
- FIPS code: 39-63954
- GNIS feature ID: 2398992
- Website: https://polandvillage.org/

Poland is a village in eastern Mahoning County, Ohio, United States. The population was 2,463 at the 2020 United States census. A suburb about 7 miles (11 km) south of Youngstown, it is part of the Youngstown–Warren metropolitan area.

== History ==
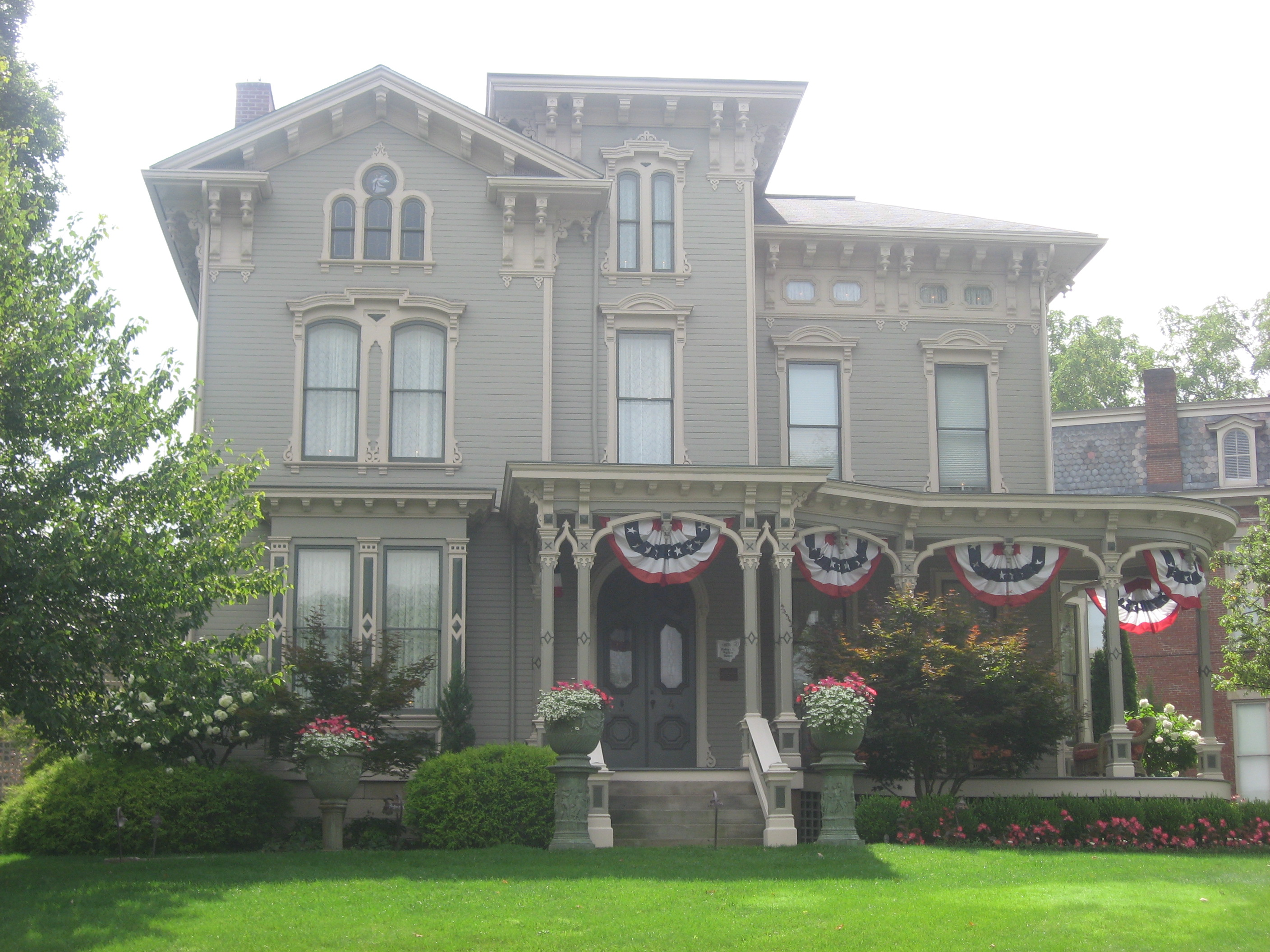
The South Main Street Historic District denotes a neighborhood of Poland's oldest structures

In 1796, Poland Township was surveyed and registered as township 1, range 1 of the Connecticut Western Reserve of the Connecticut Land Company. Turhand Kirtland was a member of a group of surveyors led by Moses Cleaveland, and is considered to have founded the community of Poland in 1798. The earliest settlers primarily originated from Connecticut and Pennsylvania. An early grist mill was built on the Yellow Creek in 1802 by Jonathan Fowler, whose family was the first to settle in the village.

Poland was named in honor of the country of Poland for its assistance during the American Revolutionary War, either due to a specific Polish hero or due to general gratitude towards the nation. An alternative legend from 1905 stated that the town instead takes its name from its original proprietor named George Poland. Poland was incorporated as a village in 1866.

Poland Seminary was originally a private secondary school, Poland Academy, and then a liberal arts college founded in 1849. Its main building has been incorporated into Poland Middle School on College Street. Its dormitory is incorporated into the Poland Public Library on Main Street. Former distinguished faculty include the journalist Ida Tarbell; graduates include William McKinley, the 25th President of the United States.

== Geography ==
According to the United States Census Bureau, the village has an area of 1.65 square miles (4.27 km^{2}), of which 1.63 square miles (4.22 km^{2}) is land and 0.02 square miles (0.05 km^{2}) is water.

== Demographics ==
Historical population
Census	Pop.	Note	%±
1850	583		—
1870	453		—
1880	452		−0.2%
1890	391		−13.5%
1900	370		−5.4%
1910	367		−0.8%
1920	561		52.9%
1930	968		72.5%
1940	1,240		28.1%
1950	1,652		33.2%
1960	2,766		67.4%
1970	3,097		12.0%
1980	3,084		−0.4%
1990	2,992		−3.0%
2000	2,866		−4.2%
2010	2,555		−10.9%
2020	2,463		−3.6%
U.S. Decennial Census

=== 2020 census ===
As of the census of 2020, there were 2,463 people and 1,090 households in the village. The population density was 1,483 inhabitants per square mile (572.6/km^{2}). There were 1,129 housing units at an average density of 680.1 per square mile (262.6/km^{2}). The village's racial makeup was 94.8% White, 0.4% African American, 0.4% Asian, and 2.8% from two or more races. Hispanic or Latino of any race were 2.4% of the population.

=== 2010 census ===
As of the census of 2010, there were 2,555 people, 1,066 households, and 765 families living in the village. The population density was 1,567.5 inhabitants per square mile (605.2/km^{2}). There were 1,135 housing units at an average density of 696.3 per square mile (268.8/km^{2}). The village's racial makeup was 98.5% White, 0.2% African American, 0.4% Asian, and 0.9% from two or more races. Hispanic or Latino of any race were 1.1% of the population.

There were 1,066 households, of which 27.8% had children under the age of 18 living with them, 59.8% were married couples living together, 8.4% had a female householder with no husband present, 3.5% had a male householder with no wife present, and 28.2% were non-families. 25.7% of all households were made up of individuals, and 13.6% had someone living alone who was 65 years of age or older. The average household size was 2.40 and the average family size was 2.88.

The median age in the village was 46.3 years. 21.4% of residents were under the age of 18; 5.9% were between the ages of 18 and 24; 21.1% were from 25 to 44; 30.4% were from 45 to 64; and 21.3% were 65 years of age or older. The village's gender makeup was 48.2% male and 51.8% female.

=== 2000 census ===
As of the census of 2000, there were 2,990 people, 1,086 households, and 822 families living in the village. The population density was 2,303.2 people per square mile (889.3 people/km^{2}). There were 1,123 housing units at an average density of 902.5 per square mile (348.5/km^{2}). The racial makeup of the village was 99.16% White, 0.24% African American, 0.10% Asian, 0.17% from other races, and 0.31% from two or more races. Hispanic or Latino of any race were 0.98% of the population.

There were 1,086 households, out of which 34.3% had children under the age of 18 living with them, 63.4% were married couples living together, 9.3% had a female householder with no husband present, and 24.3% were non-families. 22.5% of all households were made up of individuals, and 11.1% had someone living alone who was 65 years of age or older. The average household size was 2.57 and the average family size was 3.01.

In the village, the population was spread out, with 24.6% under the age of 18, 5.4% from 18 to 24, 25.6% from 25 to 44, 24.8% from 45 to 64, and 19.6% who were 65 years of age or older. The median age was 42 years. For every 100 females there were 92.2 males. For every 100 females age 18 and over, there were 87.3 males.

The median income for a household in the village was $47,273, and the median income for a family was $55,486. Males had a median income of $42,857 versus $23,603 for females. The per capita income for the village was $23,924. About 4.5% of families and 6.1% of the population were below the poverty line, including 8.8% of those under age 18 and 13.2% of those age 65 or over.

== Government ==
Poland operates under a mayor–council government, where there are six council members elected as a legislature in addition to an independently elected mayor who serves as an executive. The current mayor is Timothy Sicafuse.

== Education ==
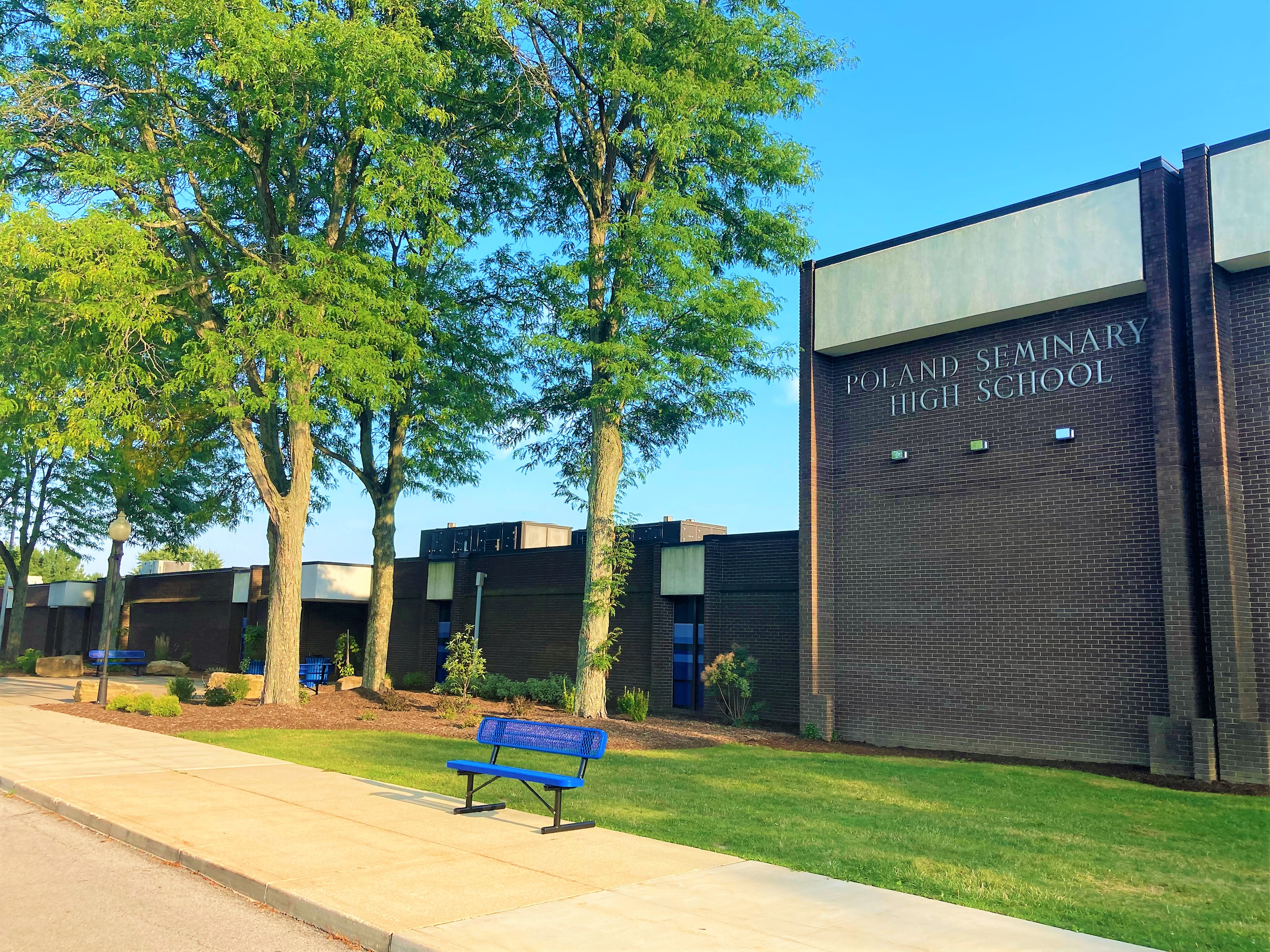
Poland Seminary High School

Poland is served by the public Poland Local School District, which includes one elementary school, one middle school, and Poland Seminary High School. The Roman Catholic Diocese of Youngstown operates the private Holy Family School, which serves children in pre-kindergarten through the 8th grade. Poland has a public library, a branch of the Public Library of Youngstown and Mahoning County.

== Notable people ==
- Ralph Palmer Agnew, mathematician
- Julian Kennedy, engineer and inventor
- Matt Marraccini, actor
- Vonda N. McIntyre, science fiction writer and biologist
- Jim Reynolds, Canadian Football League end
- Kate Brownlee Sherwood, 19th century poet and journalist

=== Politicians ===
- John Boccieri, member of the Ohio House of Representatives from the 59th district
- David S. Dennison Jr., member of the U.S. House of Representatives from Ohio's 11th district
- Jared Potter Kirtland, naturalist, malacologist, and politician
- William McKinley, 25th President of the United States
- Michael Rulli, member of the U.S. House of Representatives from Ohio's 6th district
- George Cookman Sturgiss, member of the U.S. House of Representatives from West Virginia's 2nd district
- James Traficant, member of the U.S. House of Representatives from Ohio's 17th district
