= North Heights =

Neighborhood in Youngstown, Ohio, United States

Coordinates: 41°07′35″N 80°39′05″W

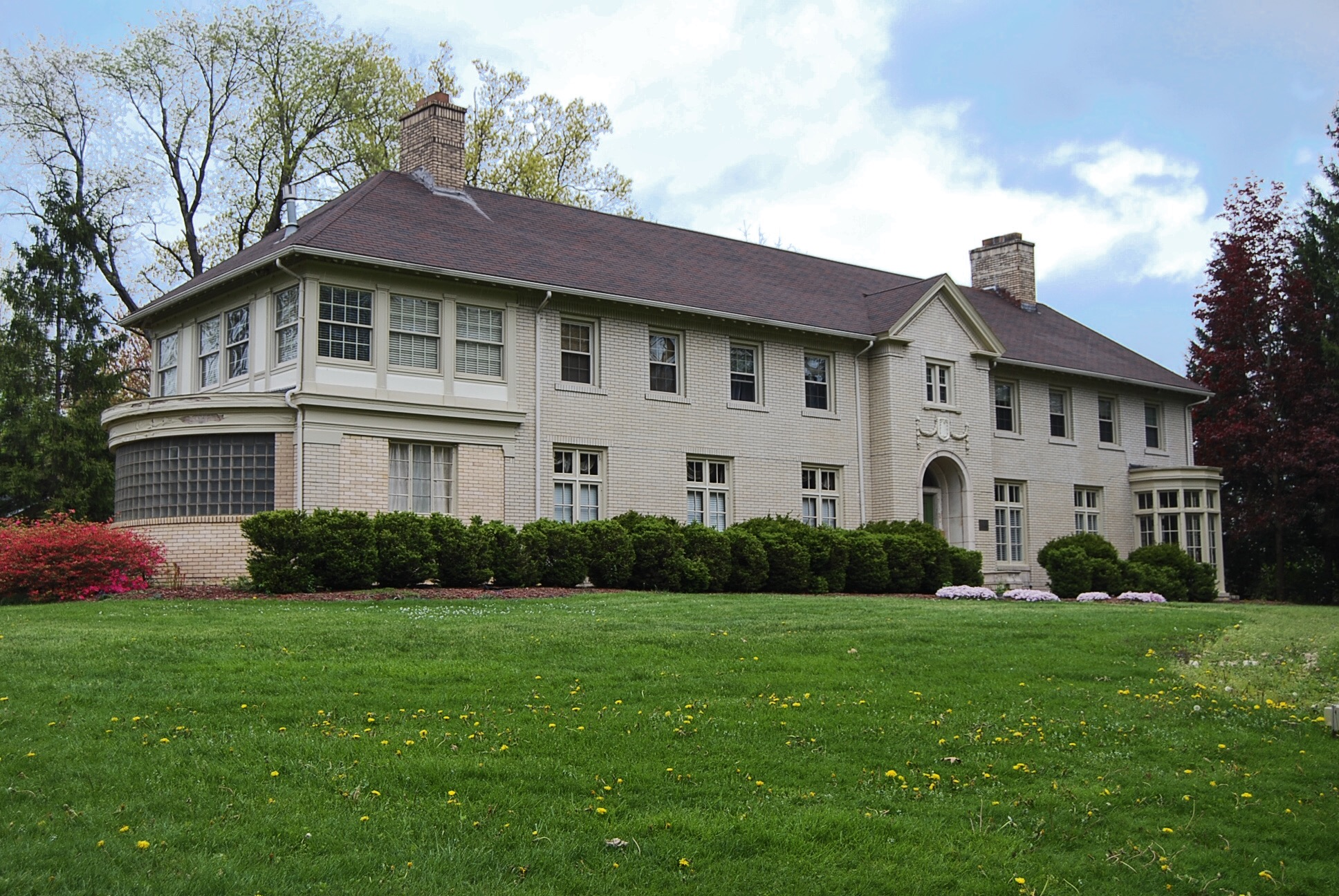
The Burt Printz Mansion on Tod Lane in North Heights

North Heights is a neighborhood in Youngstown, Ohio, located on the city's upper North Side. The neighborhood's name derives from the fact that it sits at a higher elevation than the Wick Park District, Youngstown State University, and Downtown Youngstown. The neighborhood is bordered on the north by Liberty Township, with Gypsy Lane marking the city limit (the Gypsy Line); Belmont Avenue to the west; Redondo Road and Crandall Park to the south; and Fifth Avenue to the east.

North Heights comprises a mixture of modestly scaled and larger homes. Residents of the neighborhood include African Americans, Italian Americans, Irish Americans, and Jewish Americans of various ethnic backgrounds. North Heights' traditionally large Jewish population is reflected by the presence in the neighborhood of institutions such as Heritage Homes and Levi Gardens, housing for Jewish senior citizens, the Youngstown Jewish Community Center, Noah's Park, and Akiva Academy. The neighborhood's origins as a development that featured good examples of Spanish Colonial Revival-style architecture is evident in street names such as Carlotta, Granada, Goleta, and Madera.

== History ==
The North Heights Neighborhood grew as the middle-class housing demand expanded with Youngstown's growing industrial base. The bulk of the neighborhood came into the city as part of the 1929 annexation with the rest of Youngstown Township. The landowners who developed Wick Park established the Mahoning Golf Club in 1900 on several farms north of Wick Park. It was this area that would later be North Heights.

Wealthy residents took advantage of the prestige of Fifth Avenue and frontages along Crandall Park as well as the Henry Stambaugh Golf Course. The working class resided along the hillside that rose from the Crab Creek industrial district up to Ohio Avenue (on the other side of Fifth), and middle-class residents filled in between. The stylish houses, many still remaining, reflect the tastes of the period (1903–20) and feature architecture such as Neo-Classical, Craftsman, Tudor, and Stone-Cottage design elements.

== Culture ==
Though the residents of North Heights lack a united sense of identity or self-consciousness, it is considered by many to be the nicest and most interracially blended neighborhood in the city. This diverse Northeast Ohio neighborhood strikingly resembles many parts of Cleveland Heights, Ohio.

== Revitalization Efforts ==
There have been numerous revitalization efforts within this neighborhood since 2000. A new Harding school opened in 2004. Next to Harding is The Rayen School. This high school was torn down and only its stadium remains. Hayes Middle School will be demolished.

Crandall Run flows east through Crandall Park and through several neighborhoods before entering Crab Creek. It is possible that Crandall Park will be expanded eastward and extend further toward Crab Creek as part of the 2010 Plan's citywide green network. There are three active neighborhood groups in the Crandall Park area: Crandall Park North Neighborhood Association, Crandall Park South Neighborhood association, and Fifth Avenue Boulevard Neighbors, .

Northside Pool is a local landmark, constructed in 1939. It has served the neighborhood's diverse residents through all the city's transitions, and attracts residents from throughout Youngstown.

The pool was recently remodeled and reopened late in the summer of 2007. It has, thus far, experienced expedient success in attendance and revived much needed life lacking on the Belmont-side of North Heights since the pool was closed and under construction throughout the summers of 2006 and 2007. The new Northside pool is tastefully landscaped, has a fenced public space, and benches. It should be considered by City officials a model for pools that need be placed and constructed on the east and south sides of Youngstown.

In the summer of 2007, residents from Carlotta Drive and the Planning Department's "City Script" program removed woody 1950s shrubs, litter and debris from the street-end (cal-de-sac). The Circle curb was painted Parks Department "Eco" green, and stylishly re-landscaped. A pear tree and tulips were planted, a bench was cemented by the fire hydrant on the devil's strip, and a peace pole with four languages representing the relative ethnic groups that make up the street's culture read, "May peace be in our homes and our communities." The languages chosen by the people of the western block were: Italian, Russian, Hebrew, and English (for the Irish and African-American residents).

The Carlotta Community Circle is now a local landmark and the city's first cultural garden. Every year in the early fall, the street organizes a small block party and multicultural potluck picnic at the Circle to cultivate the garden, then celebrate the street's diversity and unity. The event is called, "The Circle in September."
