= Wick Building =

- U.S. National Register of Historic Places
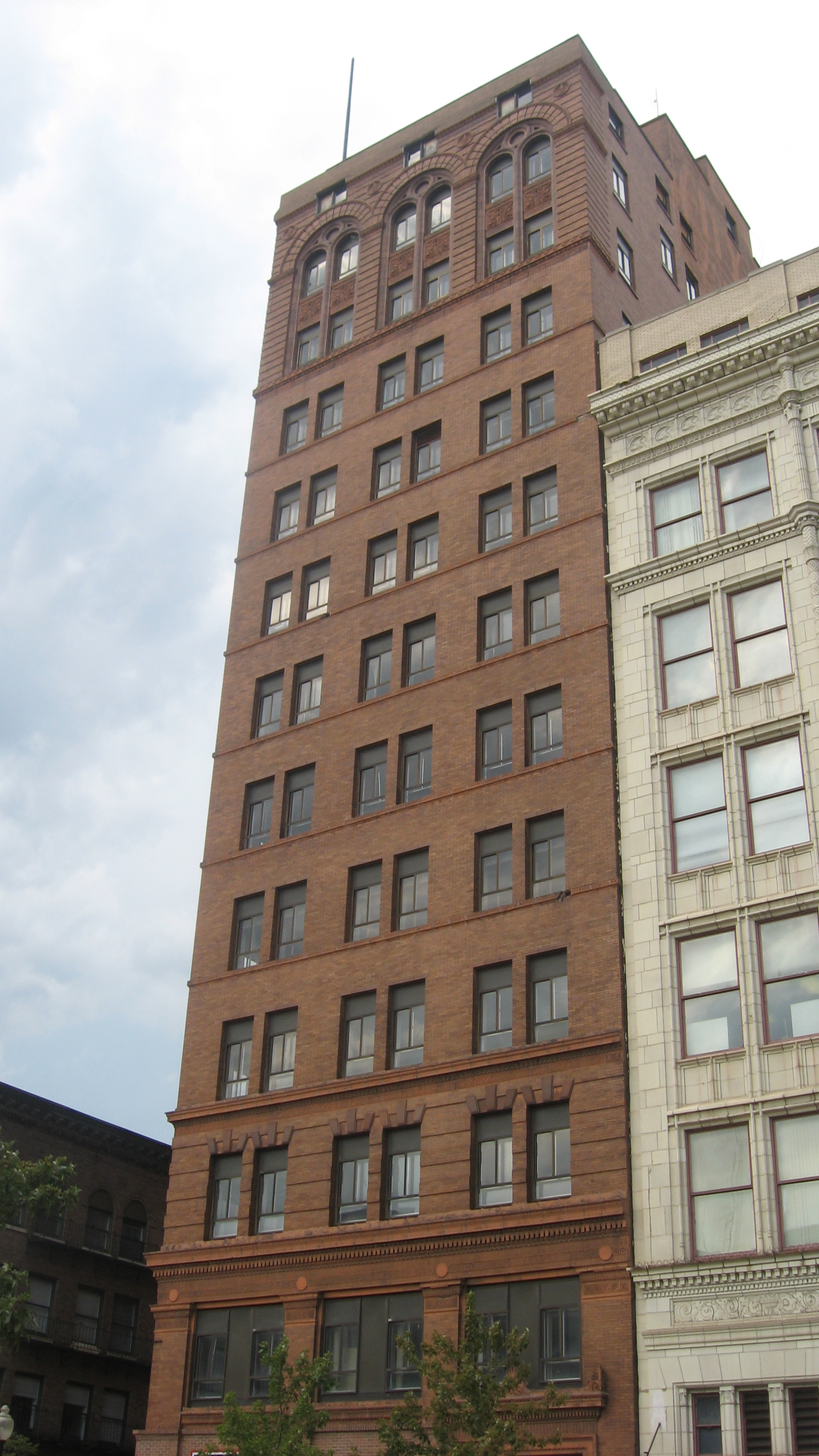
- Front of the building

- Location within Ohio
- Location: 34 Federal Plaza West, Youngstown, Ohio
- Coordinates: 41°6′2″N 80°39′2″W
- Area: less than one acre
- Built: 1910
- Architect: D. H. Burnham & Company
- Architectural style: Romanesque
- MPS: Seven Early Office Buildings at Central Square TR
- NRHP reference No.: 80003153
- Added to NRHP: February 8, 1980

The Wick Building, also known as The Wick Tower, is a high rise structure and second tallest building in Youngstown, Ohio. Constructed by D. H. Burnham & Company in 1910, the structure contains 13 floors and rises to a height of 184 feet. It is a classic example of Chicago School architecture, and contains a row of arches at the crown. The Wick Building was the tallest building in the city until the construction of Metropolitan Tower in 1929. It was listed on the National Register of Historic Places on February 8, 1980.

== Redevelopment ==
The NYO Property Group bought the Wick Building in 2012 with plans of redeveloping the building into apartments. In August 2015, the building was reopened as The Wick Tower, a mix of apartments and extended stay properties, with commercial space on the first floor.
