= Arlington Avenue Historic District =

Historic district in Ohio, United States

- Arlington Avenue District
- U.S. National Register of Historic Places
- U.S. Historic district
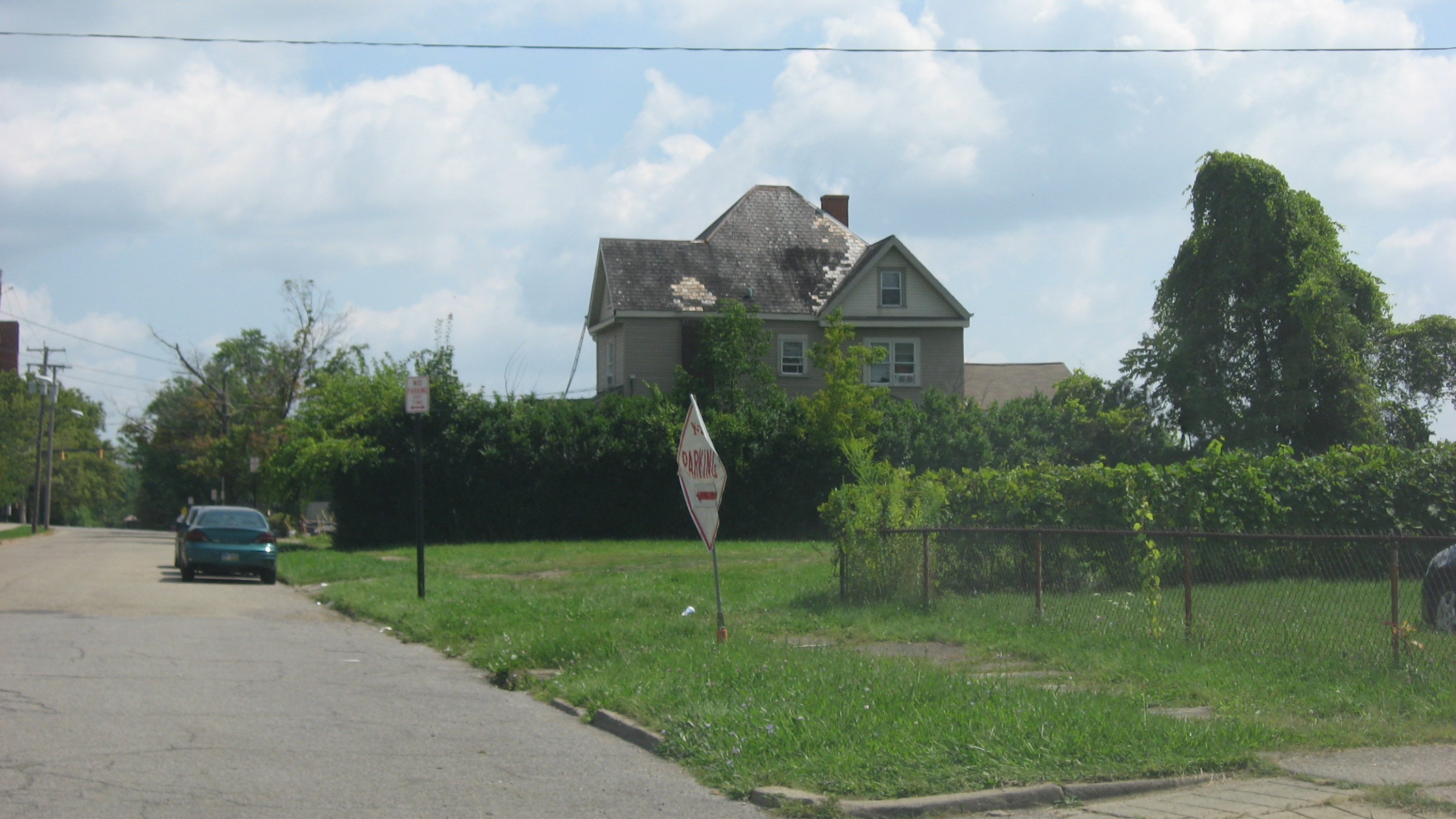
- A house and empty lots in the largely destroyed district

- Location within Ohio Location within the United States
- Location: Youngstown, Ohio
- Coordinates: 41°6′28″N 80°39′11″W
- Area: 40 acres (160,000 m^{2})
- Architectural style: Queen Anne
- NRHP reference No.: 74001565
- Added to NRHP: 1974-08-13

The Arlington Avenue Historic District is a historic district in Youngstown, Ohio, United States. It contained 38 contributing buildings when it was listed on the National Register of Historic Places in 1974. Due to various urban renewal projects beginning in the late 1970s, only two of the original structures remain today.

== Historic uses ==
- Single Dwelling
