= George J. Renner Jr. House =

Historic house in Ohio, United States

- U.S. National Register of Historic Places
- U.S. Historic district – Contributing property
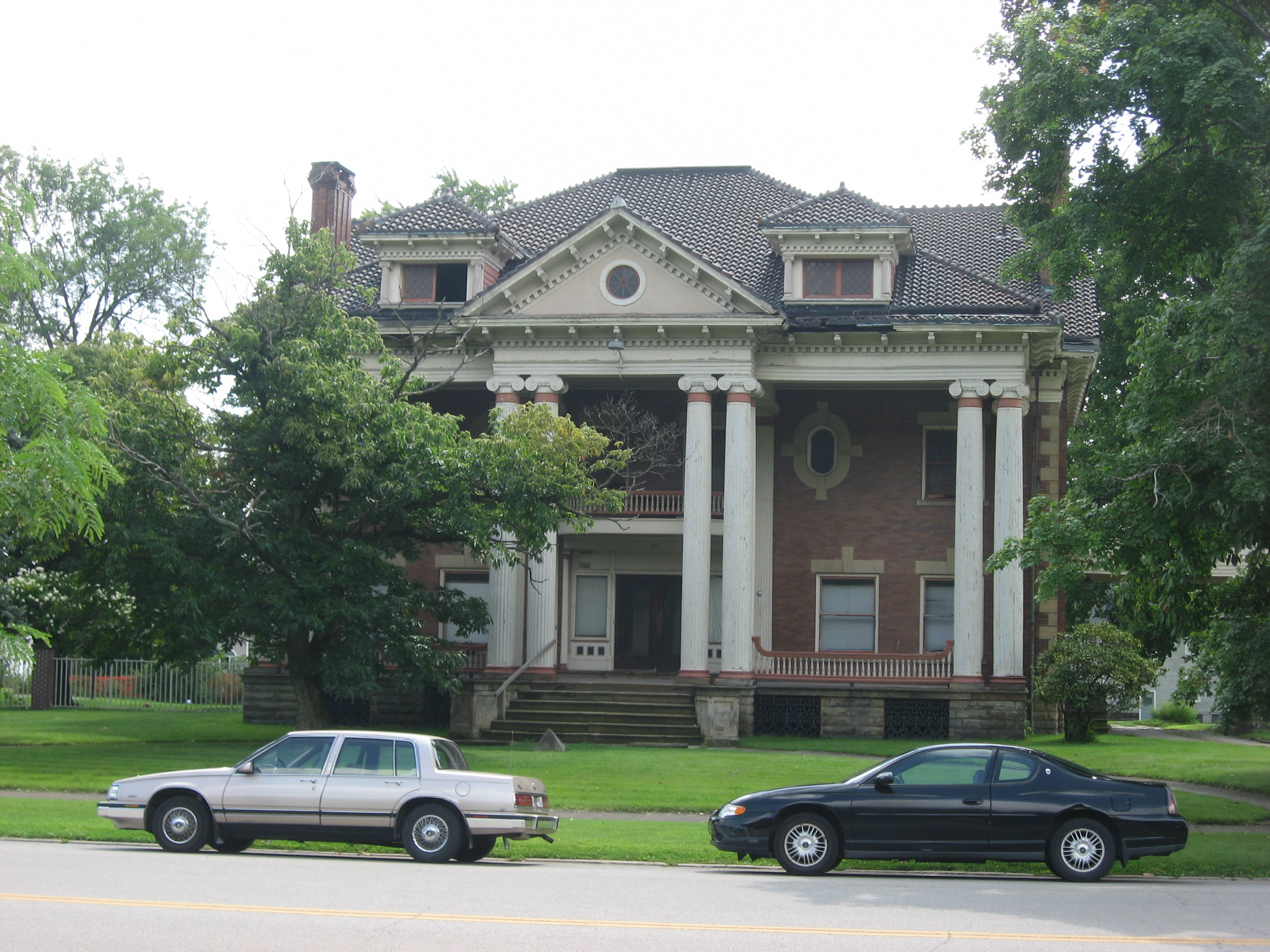
- Front, seen from Wick Park

- Location within Ohio Location within the United States
- Interactive map showing the location of George J. Renner House
- Location: 277 Park Ave., Youngstown, Ohio
- Coordinates: 41°6′47″N 80°38′58″W
- Area: Less than 1 acre (0.40 ha)
- Built: 1907
- Architectural style: Georgian Revival
- Part of: Wick Park Historic District (ID90000601)
- NRHP reference No.: 76001483
- Added to NRHP: October 8, 1976

The George J. Renner Jr. House is a historic residence in the prestigious Wick Park neighborhood of Youngstown, Ohio, United States. Once home to the city's wealthiest brewer, it has been named a historic site.

George J. Renner Sr. settled in Ohio upon immigrating to the United States in 1848, and soon he began to run breweries in the cities of Akron, Cincinnati, and Mansfield. His son George J. Renner Jr. founded a separate business in 1880, beginning with a brewery in Wooster and expanding to open another operation in Youngstown in 1884. By the beginning of the twentieth century, it was Youngstown's largest; the year 1907 saw sixty men on the payroll, and the brewery was capable of producing up to one hundred thousand barrels of beer annually.

Renner arranged for the construction of the present house in 1907. Built of brick with a tiled roof, it is typical of the homes of Youngstown's commercial élite at the beginning of the century. A grand two-story portico occupies most of the north-facing facade, contributing strongly to the house's Georgian Revival appearance. Paired columns with Ionic capitals support the porch ceiling and the portion of the third story sitting above it, while the side rises to a pedimented third-story gable with a Palladian window. Small flights of steps provide access to the portico and to a smaller porch on the western side.

In 1976, the Renner House was listed on the National Register of Historic Places, qualifying because of its historically significant architecture, as it is one of Youngstown's grandest Georgian Revival structures. It sits across Park Avenue from Wick Park proper, and when the park and surrounding neighborhood were listed on the Register in 1990 as a historic district, the Renner House became one of the district's significant contributing properties.
