= Poland Township, Mahoning County, Ohio =

Township in Ohio, US

- Township
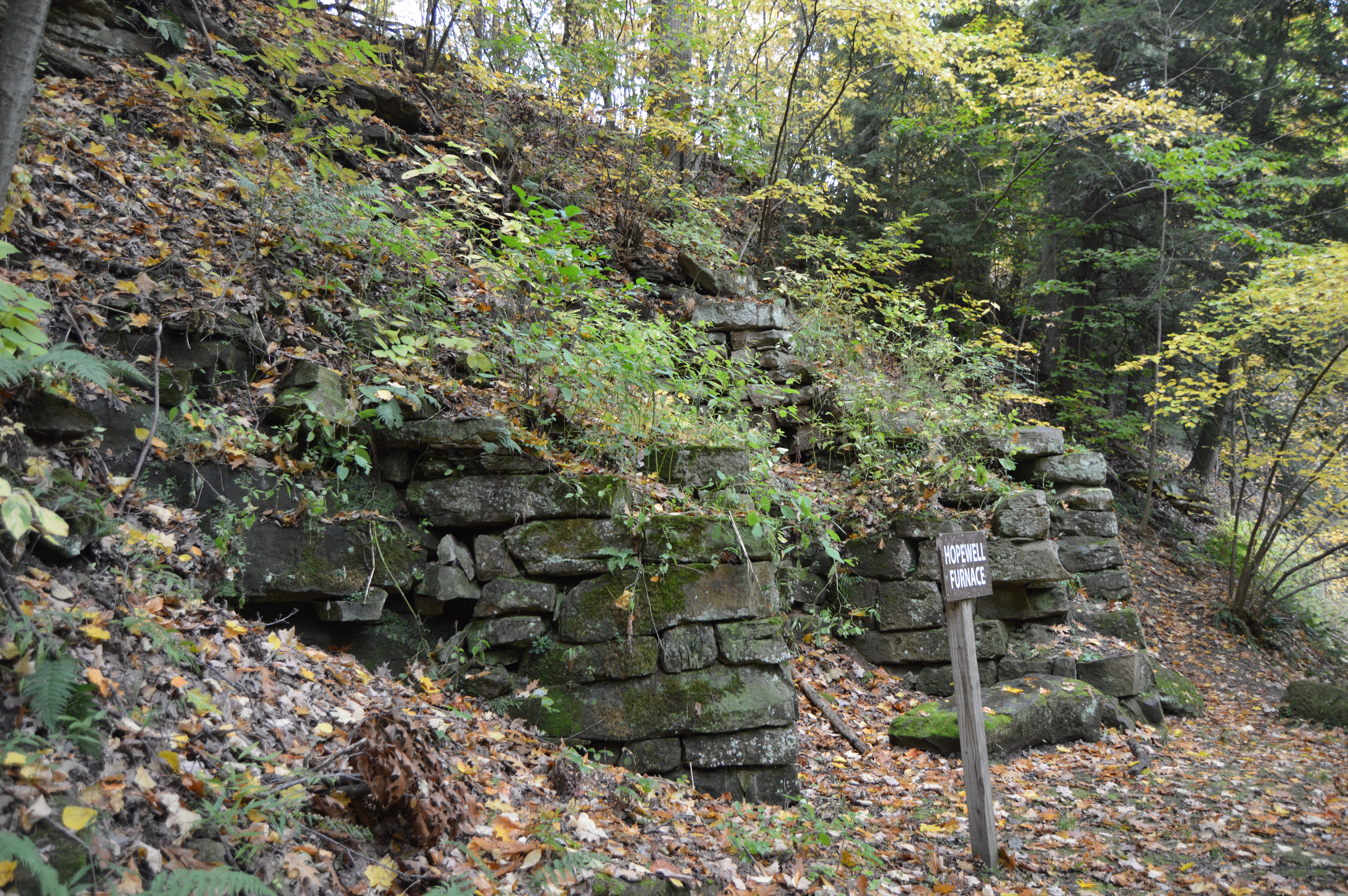
- Hopewell Furnace, the first industrial operation in the Connecticut Western Reserve

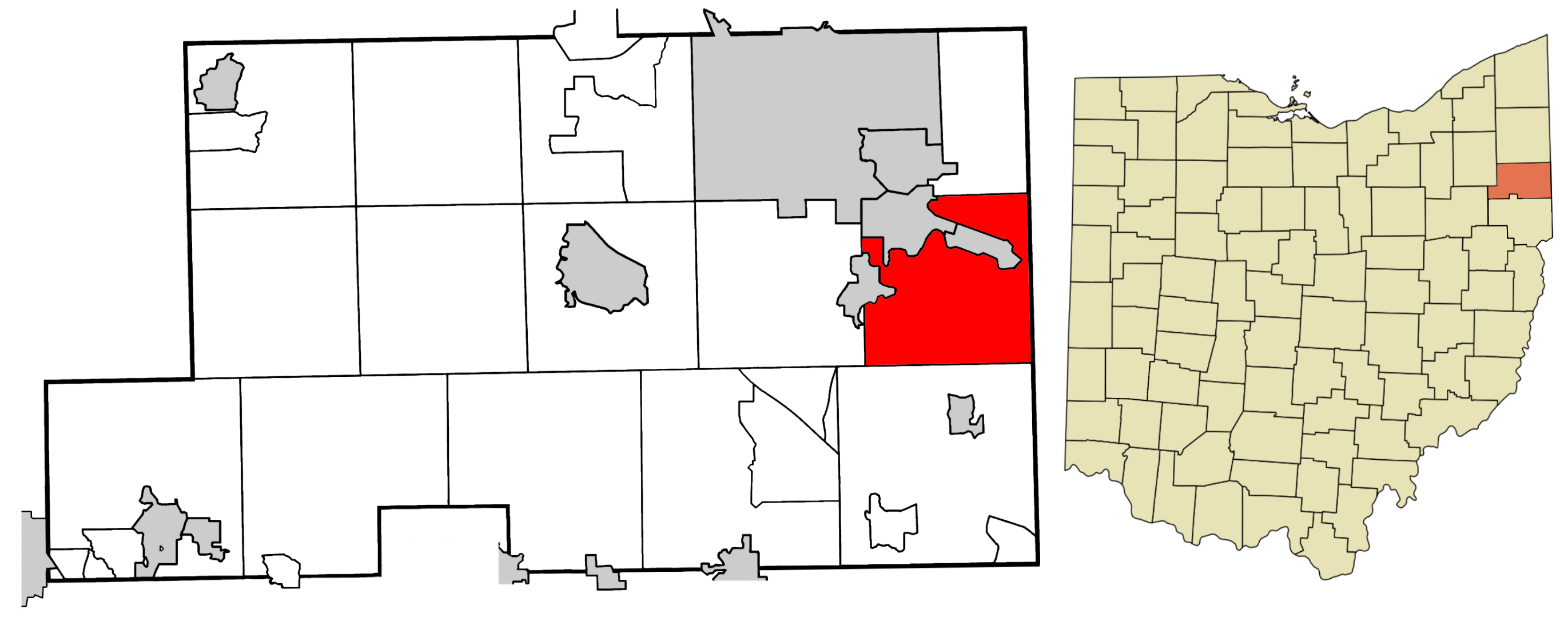
- Location of Poland Township in Mahoning County
- Coordinates: 41°1′21″N 80°35′36″W
- Country: United States
- State: Ohio
- County: Mahoning

Area
  - Total: 21.2 sq mi (55.0 km^{2})
  - Land: 20.9 sq mi (54.1 km^{2})
  - Water: 0.35 sq mi (0.9 km^{2})
- Elevation: 1,129 ft (344 m)

Population (2020)
  - Total: 14,664
  - Density: 702/sq mi (271/km^{2})
- Time zone: UTC-5 (Eastern (EST))
  - Summer (DST): UTC-4 (EDT)
- ZIP code: 44514
- Area codes: 234/330
- FIPS code: 39-63968
- GNIS feature ID: 1086568
- Website: polandtownship.gov

Poland Township is one of the fourteen townships of Mahoning County, Ohio, United States. The 2020 census found 14,664 people in the township.

== Geography ==
Located in the eastern part of the county along the Pennsylvania border, it borders the following townships:

- Coitsville Township - north
- Pulaski Township, Lawrence County, Pennsylvania - northeast
- Mahoning Township, Lawrence County, Pennsylvania - east
- North Beaver Township, Pennsylvania - southeast corner
- Springfield Township - south
- Boardman Township - west
- Struthers - northwest

Three municipalities are located in Poland Township:

- The village of Lowellville, in the east
- Part of the village of Poland, in the west
- Part of the city of Struthers, in the northwest

== Name and history ==
It is the only Poland Township statewide. It was established in 1796.

== Government ==
The township is governed by a three-member board of trustees, who are elected in November of odd-numbered years to a four-year term beginning on the following January 1. Two are elected in the year after the presidential election and one is elected in the year before it. There is also an elected township fiscal officer, who serves a four-year term beginning on April 1 of the year after the election, which is held in November of the year before the presidential election. Vacancies in the fiscal officership or on the board of trustees are filled by the remaining trustees.
