= Alliance Clay Product Company =

- U.S. National Register of Historic Places
- U.S. Historic district
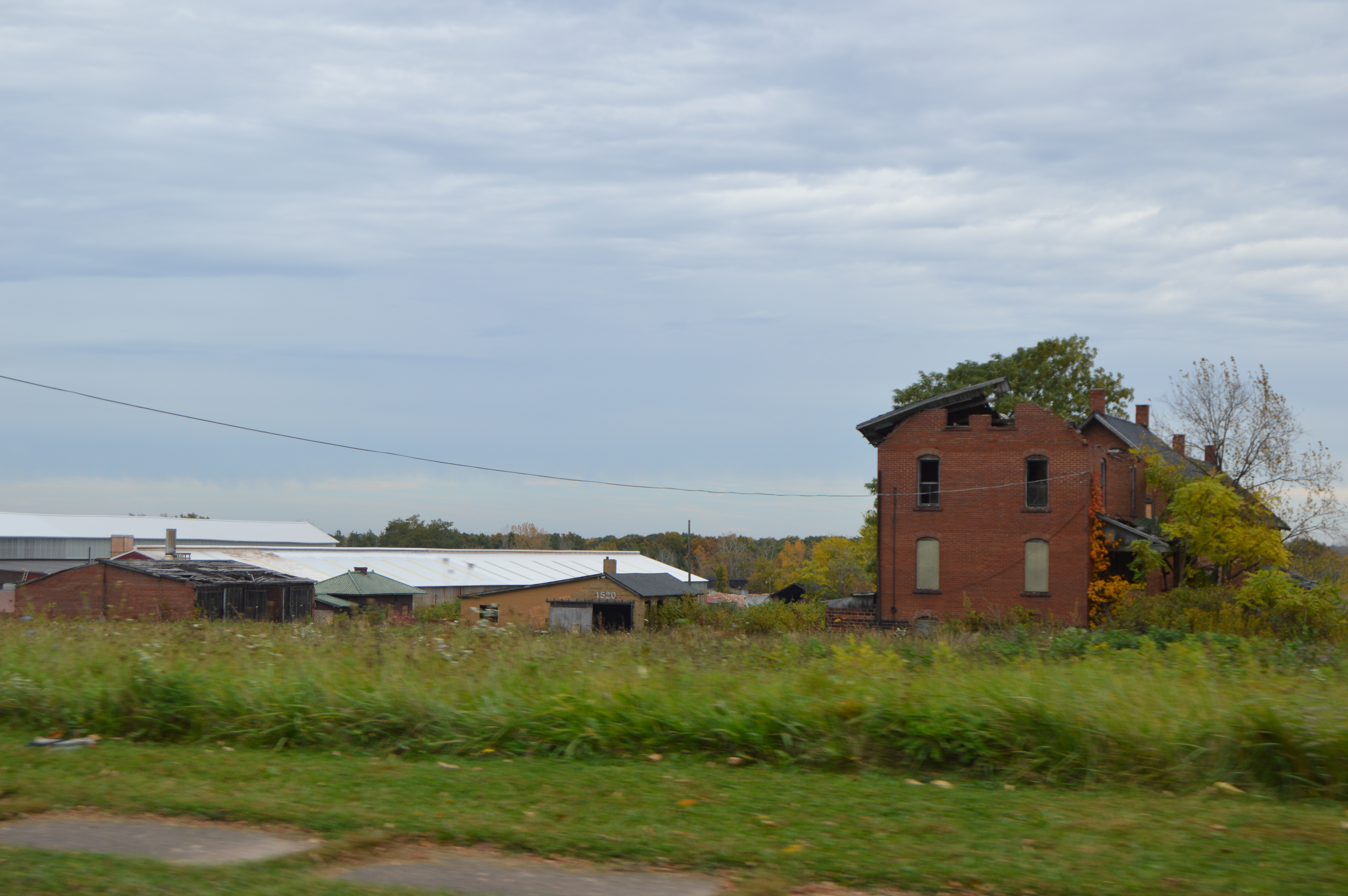
- Abandoned buildings in the complex

- Location within Ohio Location within the United States
- Nearest city: Alliance, Ohio
- Coordinates: 40°54′13″N 81°4′57″W
- Area: 713 acres (2.89 km^{2})
- NRHP reference No.: 78002130
- Added to NRHP: 1978-12-08

The Alliance Clay Product Company District is a historic district in Alliance, Ohio, United States. Listed on the National Register of Historic Places in 1978, it includes twelve contributing properties.

== History ==
The Alliance Clay Product Company was chartered in 1905, as a company for "the purpose of the manufacturing, selling and dealing in brick, paving blocks, building blocks, sewer pipe, drain tile and all kinds of clay product". The buildings themselves were built beginning in 1906, the year the company was founded by James B. Wilcox. By 1907, the single plant was producing 18,000 bricks a day. Plant No. 2 was built in 1914, followed by Plant No.3 in 1924, for a total production capacity of 275,000 bricks a day. Company houses were also built on property, beginning in the 1920s. Gas burners were installed in kilns on site beginning in 1929, following the discovery of a daily supply of 1,500,000 cubic feet of gas on the property.

Production began to decline in the 1960s, due to a rise in other road surfacing materials increasingly replacing paving bricks. Production finally ceased in 1970.

== Historic uses ==
- Single Dwelling
- Manufacturing Facility
