= Helen Chapel =

Historic chapel in Youngstown, Ohio

- U.S. National Register of Historic Places
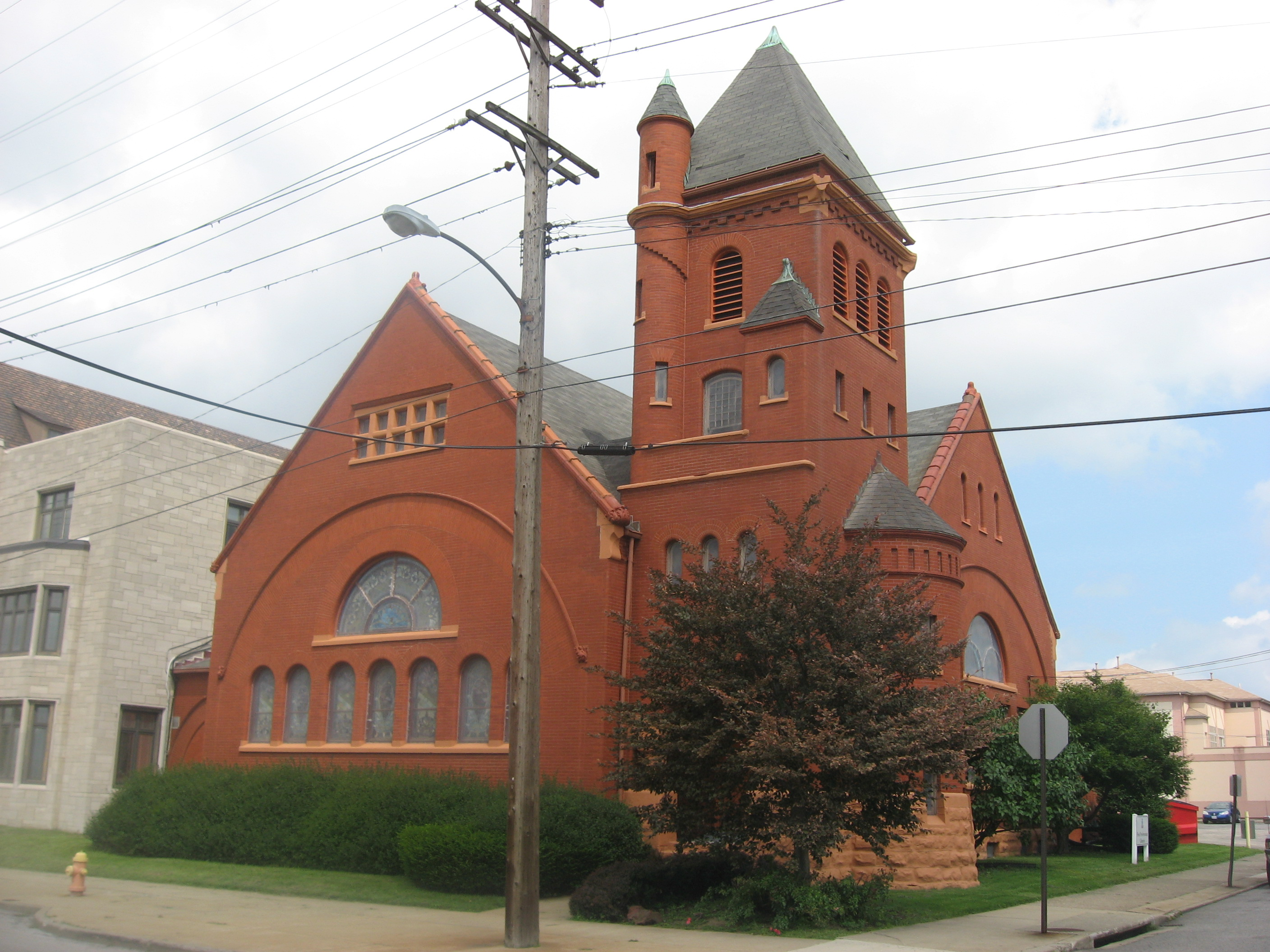
- Front and eastern side

- Location within Ohio Location within the United States
- Location: NW corner of E. Wood and Champion Sts., Youngstown, Ohio
- Coordinates: 41°6′5″N 80°38′49″W
- Area: less than one acre
- Built: 1889–90
- Architect: Adolph Kanengeiser
- Architectural style: Richardsonian Romanesque
- MPS: Downtown Youngstown MRA
- NRHP reference No.: 86001923
- Added to NRHP: July 23, 1986

The Helen Chapel is a historic chapel at the northwest corner of East Wood and Champion Streets in Youngstown, Ohio. It was completed in 1890 and added to the National Register of Historic Places in 1986.

== History and architecture ==
The Helen Chapel was built as the Sunday school of the First Presbyterian Church of Youngstown. It was built with funds donated by Myron Converse Wick and Elizabeth (Bonnell) Wick in memory of their daughter, Helen, who had died at the age of four in 1888. Wick was a member of a regionally prominent family of industrialists, and was an elder brother of George Dennick Wick, a founder of Youngstown Sheet and Tube. Their ancestor, William Wick, had been the founding pastor of the Youngstown church in 1799. The new building was designed by Youngstown architect Adolph Kanengeiser in 1889 in the Richardsonian Romanesque style. The building was dedicated May 4, 1890, and is still used for church purposes.

The building was listed on the United States National Register of Historic Places in 1986 for its historic architecture as well as its association with the regionally prominent Wick family.
