= Wick Park Historic District =

Historic district in Ohio, United States

- U.S. National Register of Historic Places
- U.S. Historic district
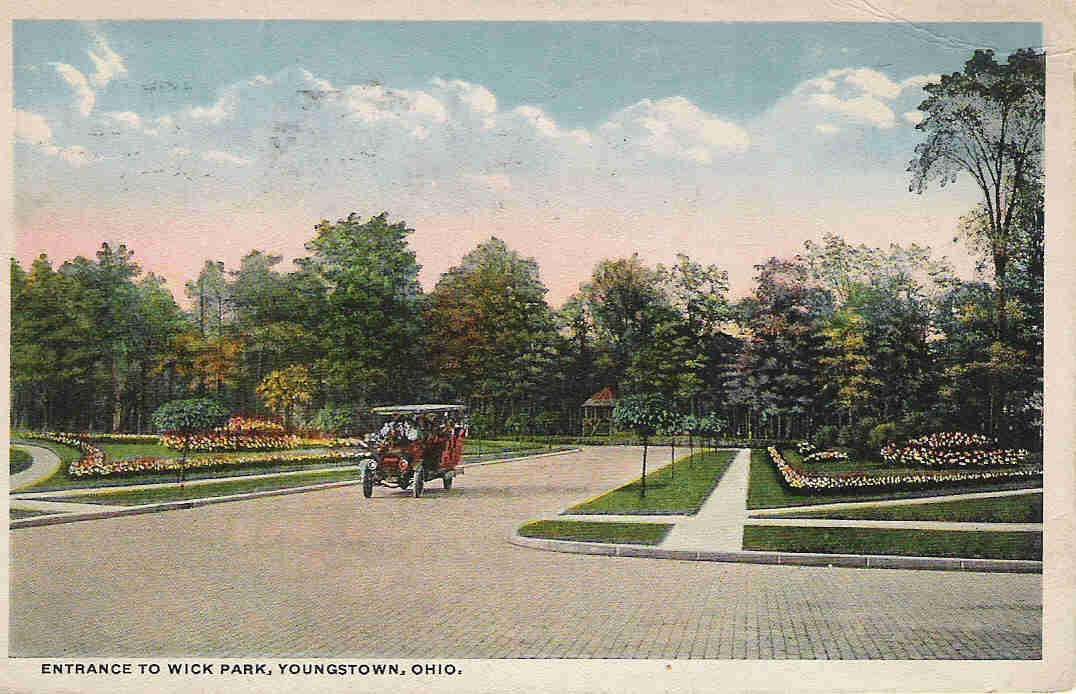

- Location within Ohio Location within the United States
- Location: Youngstown, Ohio
- Coordinates: 41°06′54″N 80°38′54″W
- Built: 1889
- Architect: Multiple
- Architectural style: Late Victorian, Bungalow/Craftsman
- NRHP reference No.: 90000601 (original); 01001041 (increase)

Significant dates
- Added to NRHP: April 5, 1990
- Boundary increase: September 24, 2001

Wick Park Historic District is a historic neighborhood on the north side of Youngstown, Ohio, with Wick Park as its centerpiece. During the first half of the 20th century, the residential district surrounding Wick Park included some of the city's most affluent neighborhoods. The district is "roughly bounded by 5th Ave, Park Ave, Elm St. and Broadway".

== History ==
In the era of industrialization, Youngstown's wealthiest business leaders and professionals migrated away from the downtown to the wooded areas near the city's northern border. These semi-suburban neighborhoods were secluded from the noisy activity of the city's steel mills and retail businesses. Wick Avenue is sometimes described as Youngstown's version of Euclid Avenue (Cleveland's Millionaire's Row), or Fifth Avenue in New York City: it was home to the community's most established families.

Although some of these mansions have survived, few are currently used for residential purposes. Youngstown State University, whose campus is located south of Wick Park, purchased several of these homes and renovated them for administrative use. One campus-area mansion now holds the Arms Family Museum of Local History.

== Surrounding features ==
Running through the western portion of the district is Fifth Avenue, which is lined with stately homes that were built by members of the area's elite. The most well-preserved of these homes are located along the upper reaches of the street, near Gypsy Lane, in the North Heights neighborhood. On the western edge of Wick Park, on Fifth Avenue, stands the Neoclassical landmark Stambaugh Auditorium, which is also listed on the National Register.

The most prominent landmark located south of the Wick Park Historic District is the former Pollock estate, which sits along the main artery of Wick Avenue. Restored and expanded in the 1980s, the mansion was turned into an upscale hotel known as the Wick-Pollock Inn. Since the hotel's closure in the late 1990s, the university allowed the renovated structure to sit vacant. However, in February 2010, YSU's board of trustees voted to restore the home and designate it as the official residence of the university president. YSU students have led recent efforts to restore the historic sunken garden located behind the structure.

The George J. Renner, Jr. House, a house listed individually on the National Register, is also included in the district.

== Revitalization ==
Wick Park occupies a central portion of the district and is maintained by the Youngstown Department of Parks and Recreation. A recent effort to revitalize the park is being led by a coalition of local organizations including the City of Youngstown, Youngstown CityScape, Youngstown State University, the Wick Park Neighborhood Association and Treez Please ().
