= Metropolitan Tower (Youngstown) =

- Central Tower Building, Central Savings and Loan Company Building (First National Bank Building, FNB Tower)
- U.S. National Register of Historic Places
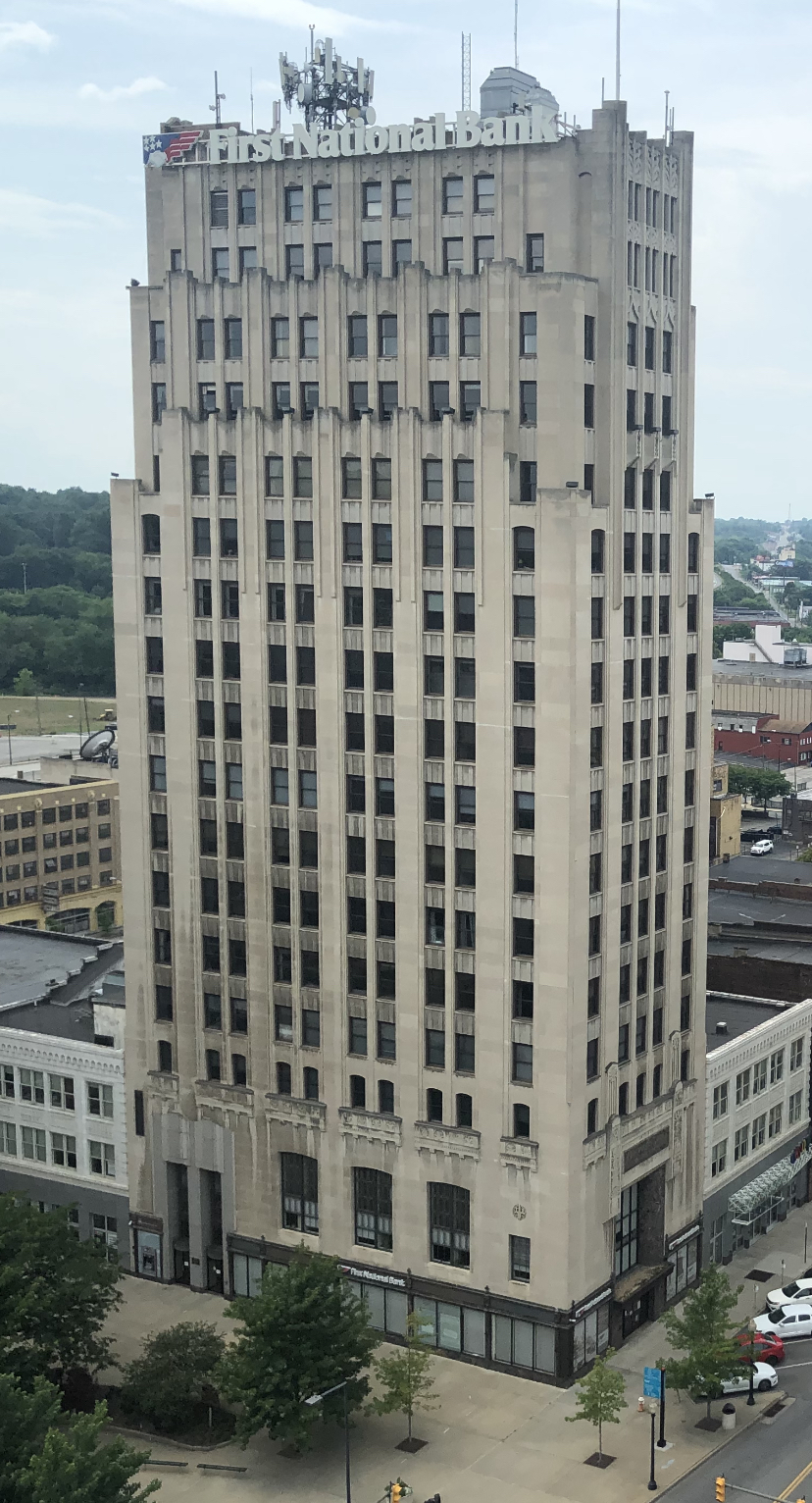

- Location within Ohio Location within the United States
- Location: 1 Federal Plaza West, Youngstown, Ohio
- Coordinates: 41°6′0″N 80°39′1″W
- Area: less than one acre
- Built: 1929
- Architect: Morris W. Scheibel
- Architectural style: Art Deco, Modernistic
- MPS: Seven Early Office Buildings at Central Square TR
- NRHP reference No.: 80003146
- Added to NRHP: February 8, 1980

Metropolitan Tower (a.k.a. Central Tower Building, First National Bank Building, FNB Tower) is a skyscraper in Youngstown, Ohio. Designed by Morris Scheibel, the building rises 17 storeys to a height of 224 feet (68 m). It has been the tallest building in the city since its completion in 1929, surpassing the Wick Building. It was listed in the National Register of Historic Places in 1980.
