= Masonic Temple (Youngstown, Ohio) =

- U.S. National Register of Historic Places
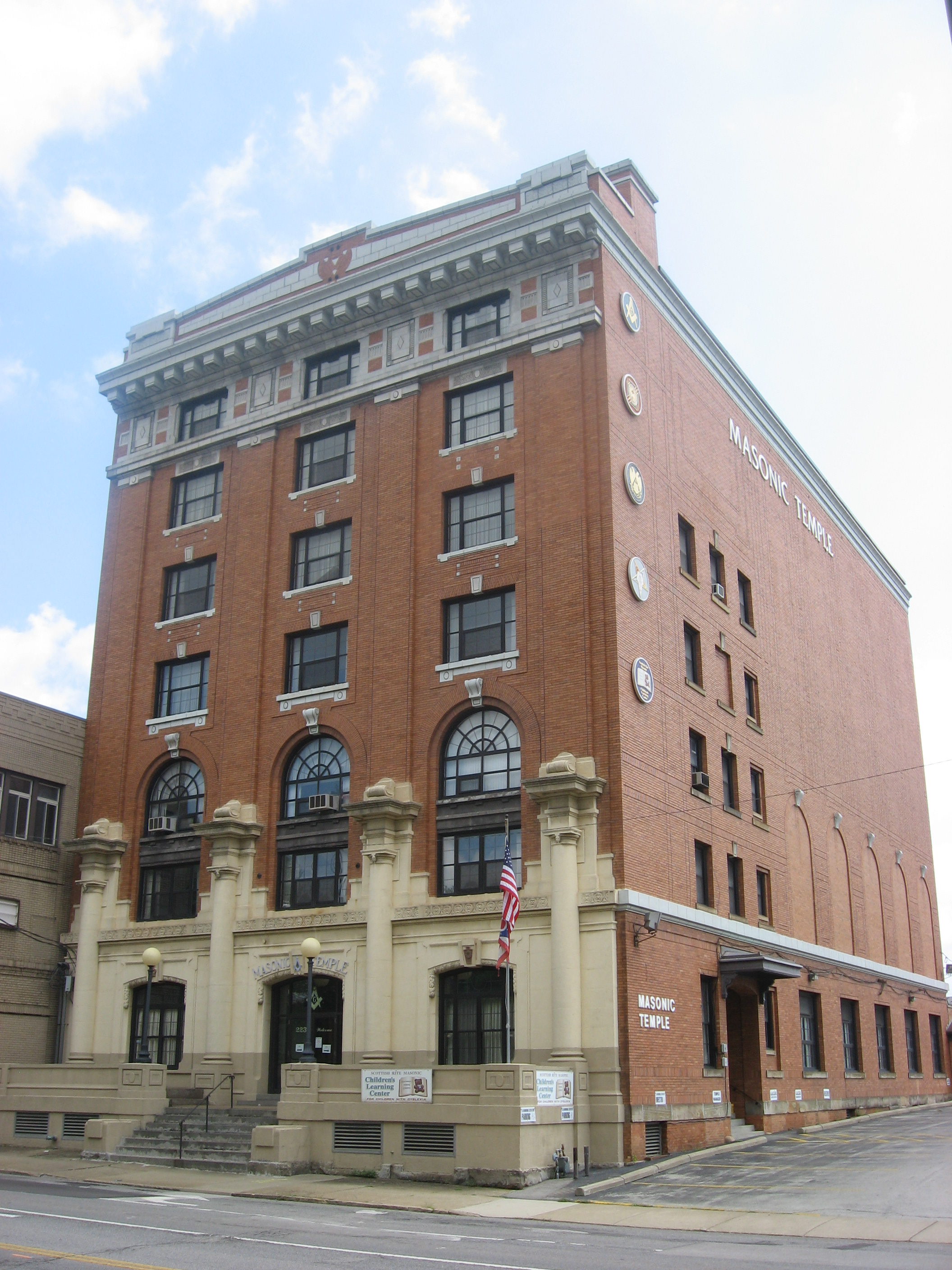
- Front and eastern side

- Location within Ohio Location within the United States
- Location: 223-227 Wick Ave., Youngstown, Ohio
- Coordinates: 41°6′9″N 80°38′51″W
- Area: less than one acre
- Built: 1909
- Architect: Thayer, A.L.
- Architectural style: Colonial Revival
- MPS: Downtown Youngstown MRA
- NRHP reference No.: 86003830
- Added to NRHP: June 13, 1997

The Masonic Temple in Youngstown, Ohio is a building from 1909. It was listed on the National Register of Historic Places in 1997.

In January, 2016 it was announced that Wick Lodge No. 481 (the last Masonic Lodge to meet in the building) could no longer afford to maintain it, and the building is to be sold.
