= McCook (surname) =

McCook is a surname. Notable people with the surname include:

- Katharine McCook (1889–1983), American art historian
- Brian Joseph McCook (born 1982), an American drag queen
- John McCook (born 1944), actor
- Tommy McCook (1927–1998), Jamaican saxophonist
- "The Fighting McCooks"
  - Daniel McCook (1798–1863), killed in action during US Civil War
    - Robert Latimer McCook (1827–1862), US general, killed during US Civil War, son of Daniel
    - Alexander McDowell McCook (1831–1903), US general, son of Daniel
    - John James McCook (lawyer) (1845–1911), soldier and lawyer, son Daniel
    - Daniel McCook, Jr. (1834–1864) soldier, killed in action during US Civil War, son of Daniel
    - Edwin S. McCook (1837–1873), Governor of Dakota Territory son of Dan
  - John James McCook (1806–1865), served in Civil war, brother of Daniel
    - Edward Moody McCook (1833–1909), soldier and governor, son of John
    - Anson George McCook (1835–1917), politician, son of John
    - Henry Christopher McCook (1837–1911), clergyman and naturalist, son of John
    - John James McCook (professor) (1843–1927), clergyman and professor, son of John
    - Roderick McCook (1839–1886), U.S. Naval officer, son of John

== See also ==
- Laurette Spang-McCook, American actress
