= John James McCook (disambiguation) =

John James McCook (1806–1865) was the patriarch of the Fighting McCooks, one of the most prolific families in United States Army history.

John James McCook may also refer to:

- John James McCook (lawyer) (1845–1911), an American corporate attorney, business director, and soldier, serving as a Union Army officer during the American Civil War
- John James McCook (professor) (1843–1927), an American chaplain in the Union Army during the American Civil War, and reconstruction era lawyer, professor, and theologian.

== See also ==
- McCook (disambiguation)
- John McCook (born 1944), American television actor
