= National Register of Historic Places listings in Carroll County, Ohio =

Location of Carroll County in Ohio

This is a list of the National Register of Historic Places listings in Carroll County, Ohio.

It is intended to be a complete list of the properties on the National Register of Historic Places in Carroll County, Ohio, United States. The locations of National Register properties for which the latitude and longitude coordinates are included below, may be seen in a Google map.

There are 12 properties listed on the National Register in the county. Another property was once listed but has been removed.

This National Park Service list is complete through NPS recent listings posted March 14, 2025.

== Current listings ==
	Name on the Register	Image	Date listed	Location	City or town	Description
1	Carroll County Courthouse	Carroll County Courthouse	October 22, 1974 (#74001406)	Public Sq. 40°34′20″N 81°05′09″W	Carrollton	
2	John Herrington House and Herrington Bethel Church	John Herrington House and Herrington Bethel Church	January 19, 1983 (#83001949)	4070 Arbor Rd., NE. 40°38′57″N 81°00′46″W	Augusta Township	
3	Patrick Hull House	Patrick Hull House	December 15, 1982 (#82001362)	8187 Blade Rd., near Oneida; 40°42′06″N 81°09′09″W	Brown Township	
4	Kilgore Union Presbyterian Church	Kilgore Union Presbyterian Church	March 15, 1995 (#95000166)	7219 Germano Rd., SE., in Kilgore; 40°27′37″N 81°00′00″W	Loudon Township	
5	Daniel McCook House	Daniel McCook House	November 10, 1970 (#70000486)	Public Sq. 40°34′19″N 81°05′14″W	Carrollton	Home of Daniel McCook
6	Methodist Episcopal Church	Methodist Episcopal Church	July 5, 2024 (#100010474)	121 West Wood Street; 40°41′37″N 81°10′56″W	Malvern	
7	Petersburg Mill	Petersburg Mill	November 20, 1970 (#70000487)	4.3 miles south of Carrollton on State Route 332; 40°30′46″N 81°06′45″W	Union Township	
8	Henry and Mary Pottorf House and Farmstead	Henry and Mary Pottorf House and Farmstead	March 9, 1995 (#95000171)	4071 Meter Rd. 40°39′46″N 81°00′29″W	Augusta Township	
9	St. Mary's of Morges	St. Mary's of Morges	April 11, 1977 (#77001047)	8012 Bachelor Rd., NW. 40°38′04″N 81°14′33″W	Rose Township	
10	Seven Ranges Terminus	Seven Ranges Terminus	December 12, 1976 (#76001527)	West of Magnolia at the junction of Stark, Tuscarawas, and Carroll counties 40°39′07″N 81°19′05″W	Rose Township	Extends into Stark and Tuscarawas counties
11	Van Horn Building	Van Horn Building	September 3, 1987 (#87001375)	Public Sq., junction of W. Main and N. Lisbon Sts. 40°34′23″N 81°05′11″W	Carrollton	
12	Wheeling and Lake Erie RR Minerva Station	Wheeling and Lake Erie RR Minerva Station	September 10, 1992 (#92001246)	301 Valley St. 40°43′33″N 81°06′17″W	Minerva	

== Former listing ==
	Name on the Register	Image	Date listed	Date removed	Location	City or town	Description
1	Minerva Grade School	Minerva Grade School	October 15, 1973 (#73001393)	October 7, 1976	Southeastern corner of W. Line St. at Grant Boulevard; 40°43′40″N 81°06′29″W	Minerva	

== See also ==
- List of National Historic Landmarks in Ohio
- Listings in neighboring counties: Columbiana, Harrison, Jefferson, Stark, Tuscarawas
- National Register of Historic Places listings in Ohio
