= General McCook =

General McCook may refer to:

- Alexander McDowell McCook (1831–1903), Union Army major general
- Daniel McCook Jr. (1834–1864), Union Army brigadier general
- Edward M. McCook (1833–1909), Union Army brigadier general and brevet major general
- Robert Latimer McCook (1827–1862), Union Army brigadier general
