= Alexander McDowell McCook =

Union Army general (1831–1903)

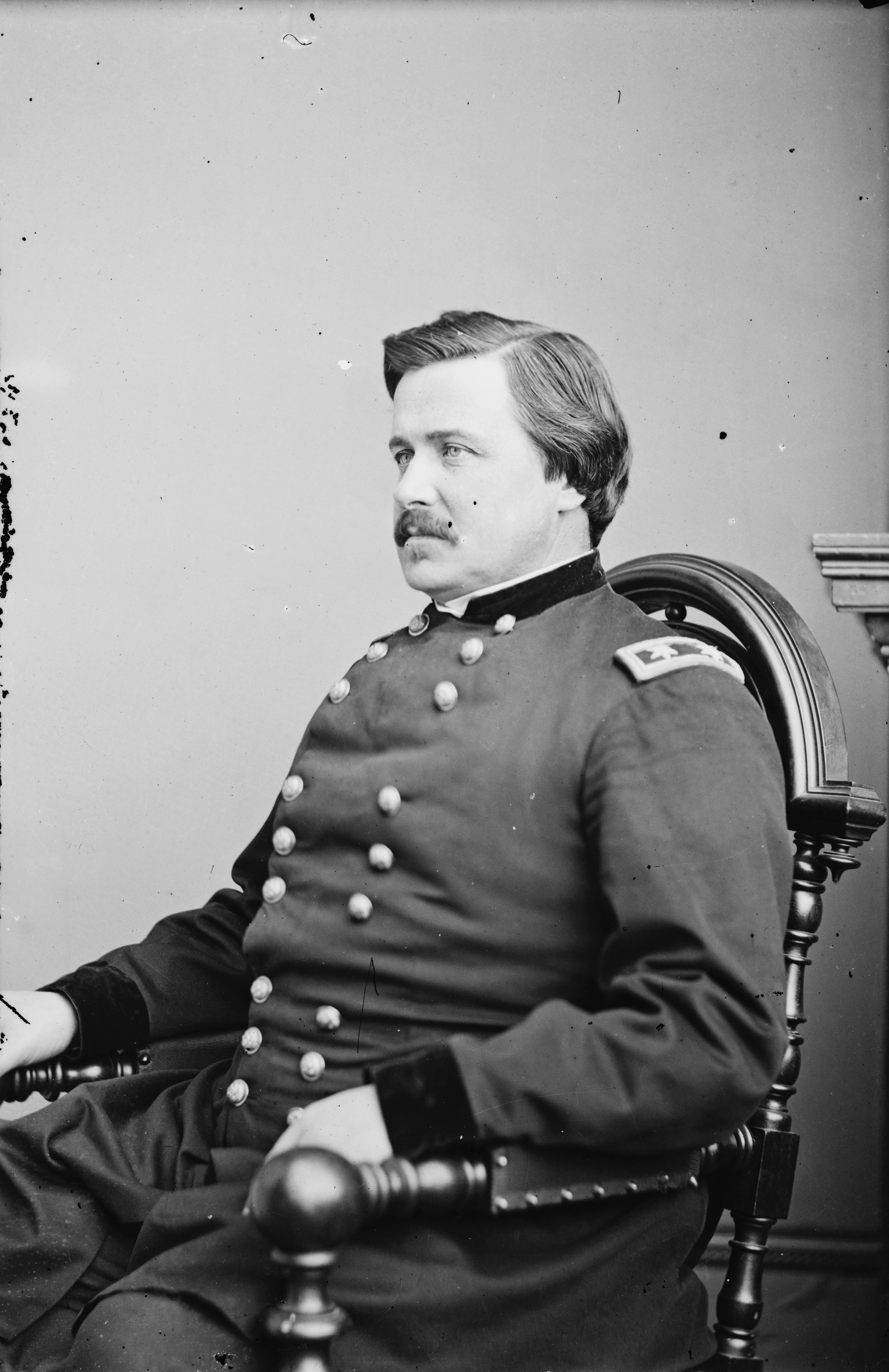
- Alexander McDowell McCook
- Born: April 22, 1831; Columbiana County, Ohio, U.S.
- Died: June 12, 1903 (aged 72); Dayton, Ohio, U.S.
- Burial place: Spring Grove Cemetery, Cincinnati, Ohio
- Military career
- Allegiance: United States of America; Union
- Branch: United States Army; Union Army
- Service years: 1852–1895
- Rank: Major General
- Commands: 1st Ohio Infantry; XX Corps; 10th U.S. Infantry; 6th U.S. Infantry
- Conflicts: Indian Wars American Civil War: First Battle of Bull Run; Battle of Shiloh; Siege of Corinth; Battle of Perryville; Battle of Stones River; Battle of Chickamauga; Battle of Fort Stevens

Alexander McDowell McCook (April 22, 1831 – June 12, 1903) was a career United States Army officer and a Union general in the American Civil War.

== Early life ==
McCook was born in Columbiana County, Ohio. A Scottish family, the McCooks were prominent in army service — his father Daniel McCook and seven of Alexander's brothers, plus five of his first cousins, fought in the war. They were known as "The Fighting McCooks", for whom McCook Field in Dayton, Ohio, was named.

His brothers Daniel McCook, Jr., Edwin Stanton McCook, and Robert Latimer McCook were all Union generals, as were his cousins Anson G. McCook and Edward M. McCook. Their grandfather, George McCook, had participated in the Irish Rebellion of 1798 and escaped to the United States after it was defeated.

McCook graduated from the United States Military Academy in 1852, served against the Apaches and Utes in New Mexico in 1853–57, and was assistant instructor of infantry tactics at the military academy in 1858–61. He held the rank of 1st lieutenant in the regular army when war broke out in 1861.

== Civil War ==
Maj. Gen Alexander M. McCook (center) and his staff on porch of quarters, Brightwood (7th Street Road near present Sheridan St)

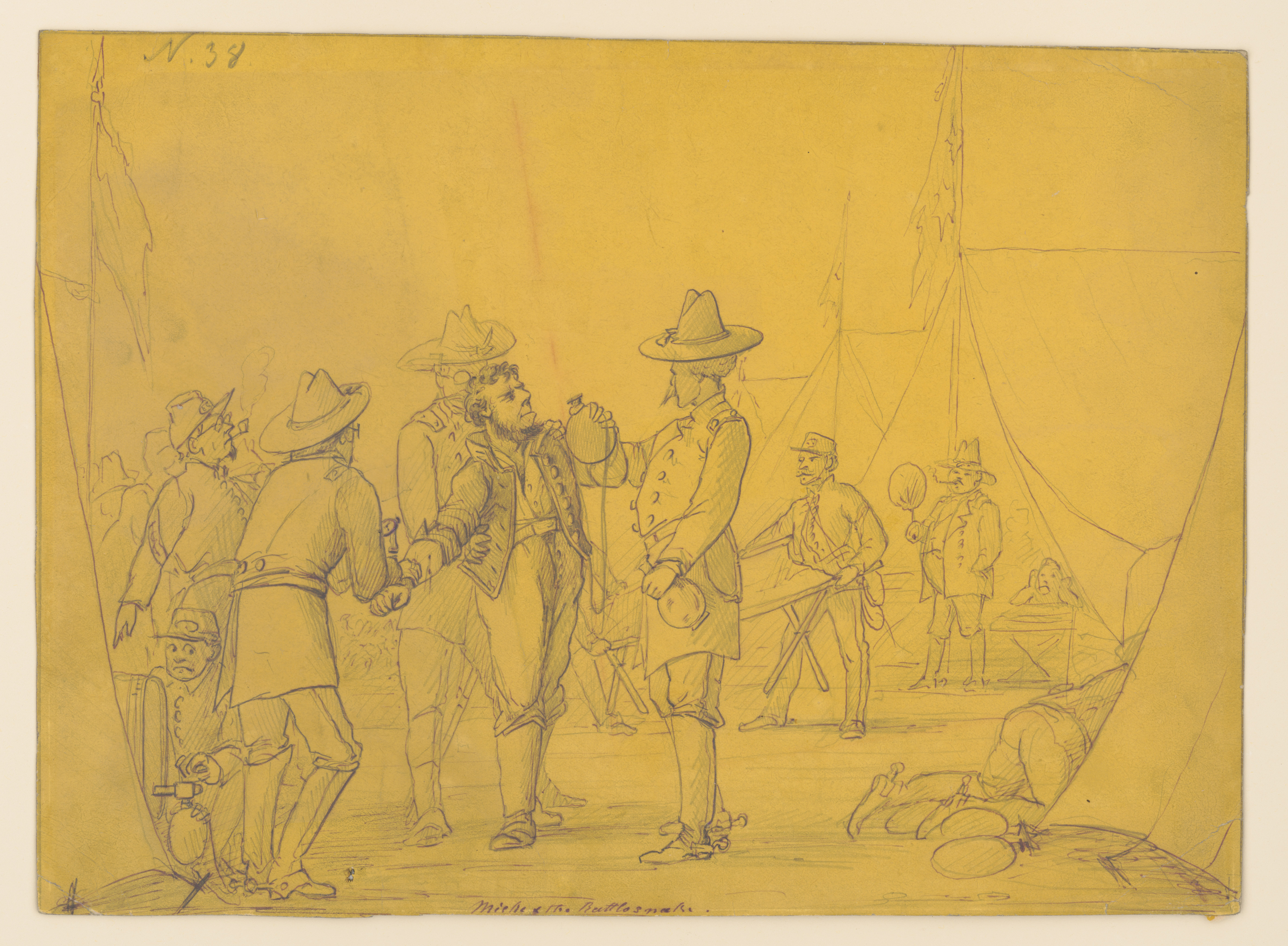
General Alexander McDowell McCook's headquarters, Tuscumbia, Alabama, by Adolph Metzner.

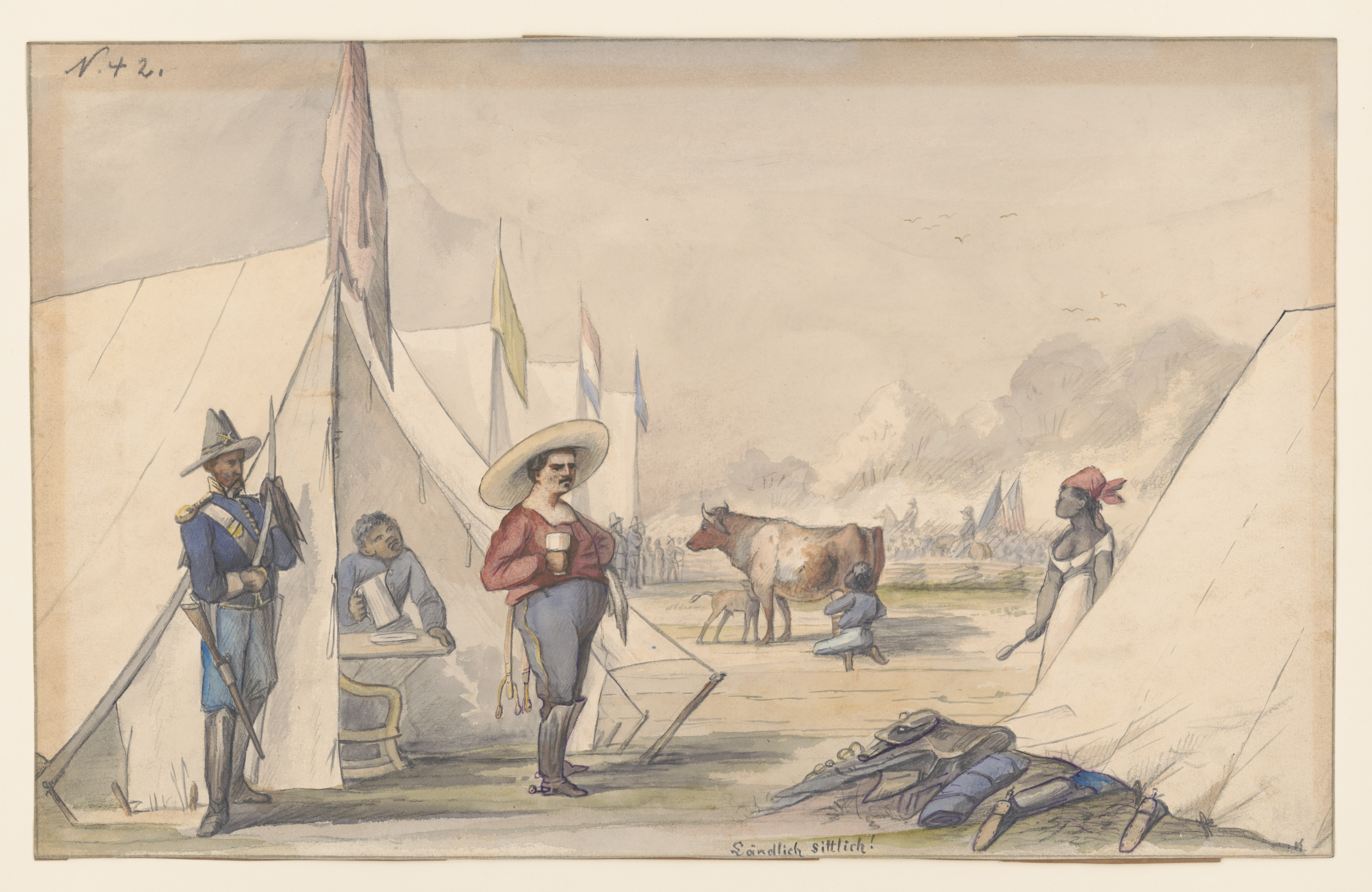
Camp of General Alexander McDowell McCook near Stevenson, Alabama, summer 1862, by Adolph Metzner.

At the start of the Civil War, McCook received a commission as colonel of the 1st Ohio Infantry in April 1861. He served in the Washington defenses and saw action at the First Battle of Bull Run. McCook was promoted to captain in the regular army in May.

On September 3, 1861, he was promoted to brigadier general of volunteers, commanded a brigade in Kentucky that fall, and led a division by February 1862. He earned the brevet of lieutenant colonel in the regular army for his part in the capture of Nashville, Tennessee. McCook then commanded the 2nd Division in the Army of the Ohio at the Battle of Shiloh on the second day of fighting, and then in the subsequent campaign against Corinth. He was promoted to major general of volunteers on July 17, 1862.

McCook was given command of the I Corps in the Army of the Ohio. His corps suffered heavy casualties and was driven back a mile at the Battle of Perryville in October 1862. Command of the Army of the Ohio was reorganized, and his command was designated the Right Wing of the XIV Corps in the new Army of the Cumberland. His command again suffered heavy losses at the Battle of Stones River. Once again, the command structure was reorganized, and his corps was named the XX Corps. For the third and final time, at Chickamauga, McCook's troops suffered heavily and were driven from the field. He was court-martialed and partially blamed for the Union disaster at Chickamauga. He was not convicted but relieved of duty in the Army of the Cumberland. McCook's demotion from command was in large part political, as he was a pro-slavery Democrat and had earned the ire of Secretary of War Edwin Stanton.

He waited almost a year before receiving another command assignment of any kind. It came thanks in part to Confederate General Jubal Early and his threat against Washington, D.C. McCook was placed in command of the "Defenses of the Potomac River and Washington" and was in charge of all forces defending the capital at the Battle of Fort Stevens. The day the battle ended, so did McCook's command of the city's defenses, and he was again without command. At the close of the war, he was given command of the District of Eastern Arkansas. He received brevet promotions to brigadier general and major general in the regular army for service throughout the war.

== Postbellum career ==
McCook resigned from the volunteer service in October 1865 and reverted to the regular army rank of captain. In 1867, he was promoted to lieutenant colonel in the 25th US Infantry. He served in Texas, mostly in garrison duty, until 1874. From 1875 to 1880, he served as the aide-de-camp to the general-in-chief of the U.S. Army, Gen. William T. Sherman. In 1880, he was promoted to full colonel. From 1886 to 1890 (except for brief terms of absence), he commanded Fort Leavenworth in Kansas, and the infantry and cavalry school there. He then commanded the Department of Arizona from 1890 to 1893 and the Department of Colorado from 1893 to 1895.

McCook became a full brigadier general in 1890, a major general in 1894, and retired in 1895. One of his final actions before retirement was helping send Army troops to break up the 1894 Chicago railroad strike. In 1898–99, he served on a commission to investigate the United States Department of War as administered during the Spanish–American War.

McCook died at his daughter's home in Dayton, Ohio, on June 12, 1903, after suffering a stroke and was buried in Spring Grove Cemetery, Cincinnati, Ohio.

The town of McCook, Nebraska, was named in his honor.

== See also ==
- List of American Civil War generals (Union)

Military offices
Preceded by none	Commander of the XX Corps; January 9, 1863 – October 9, 1863	Succeeded by none
Preceded by Thomas Howard Ruger	Commandant of the Command and General Staff College; August 1890 – October 1894	Succeeded by Edwin F. Townsend
