= Kilgore, Ohio =

Unincorporated community in Ohio, U.S.

Coordinates: 40°27′51″N 81°00′06″W

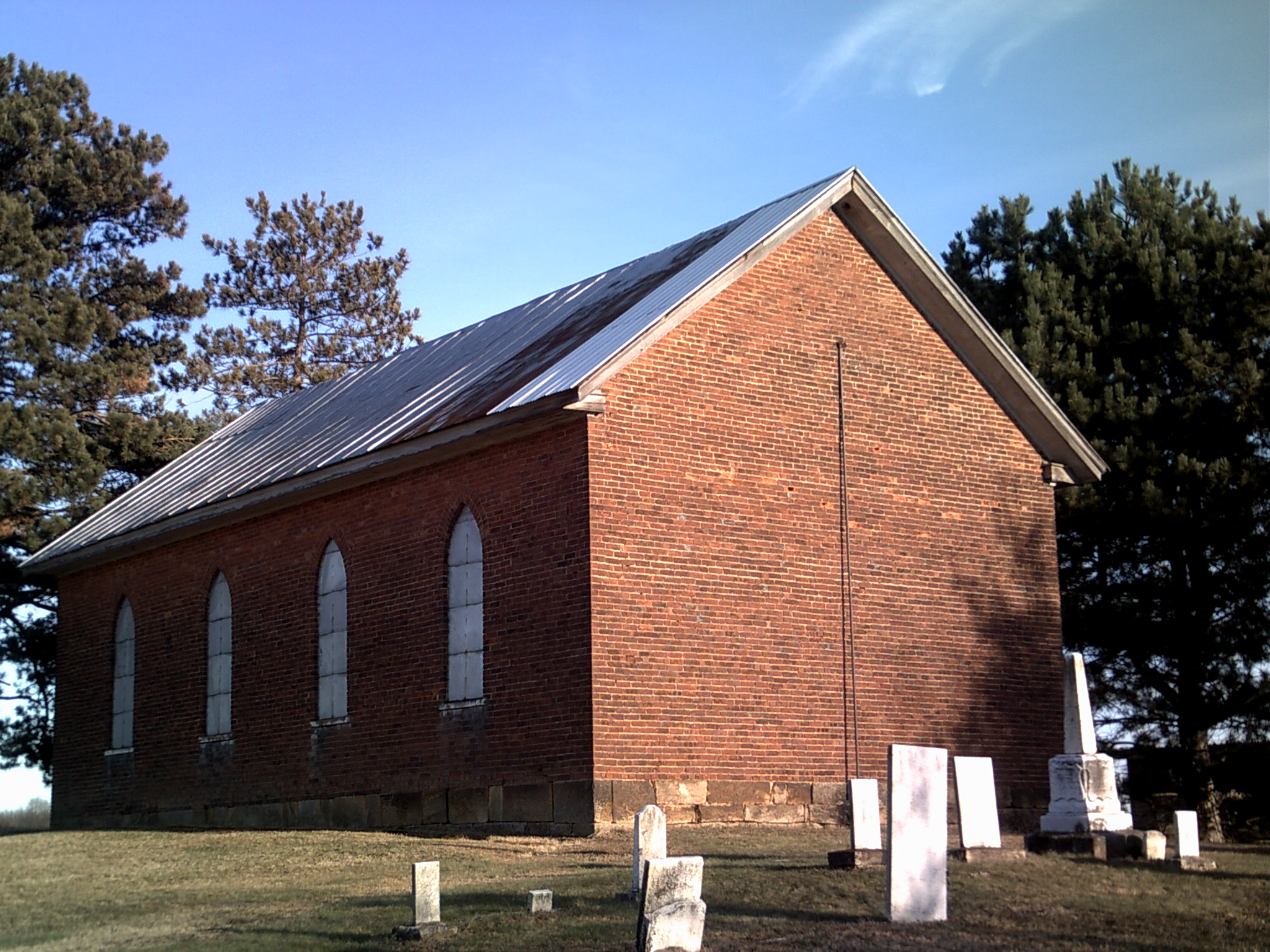
Kilgore Union Presbyterian Church

Kilgore is an unincorporated community in Loudon Township, Carroll County, Ohio, United States. The community is part of the Canton–Massillon Metropolitan Statistical Area. The community is served by the Carrollton post office, ZIP code 44615. It lies at the intersection of State routes 9 and 164.

== History ==
The community was platted soon after the formation of Loudon Township in December 1834 by John Able, and named for Daniel Kilgore of Cadiz, Ohio.

Kilgore Union Presbyterian Church in the community is listed in the National Register of Historic Places.

== Education ==
Students attend the Carrollton Exempted Village School District, which closed the Kilgore Elementary School.
