= Kilgore Union Presbyterian Church =

Historic church in Ohio, United States

- U.S. National Register of Historic Places
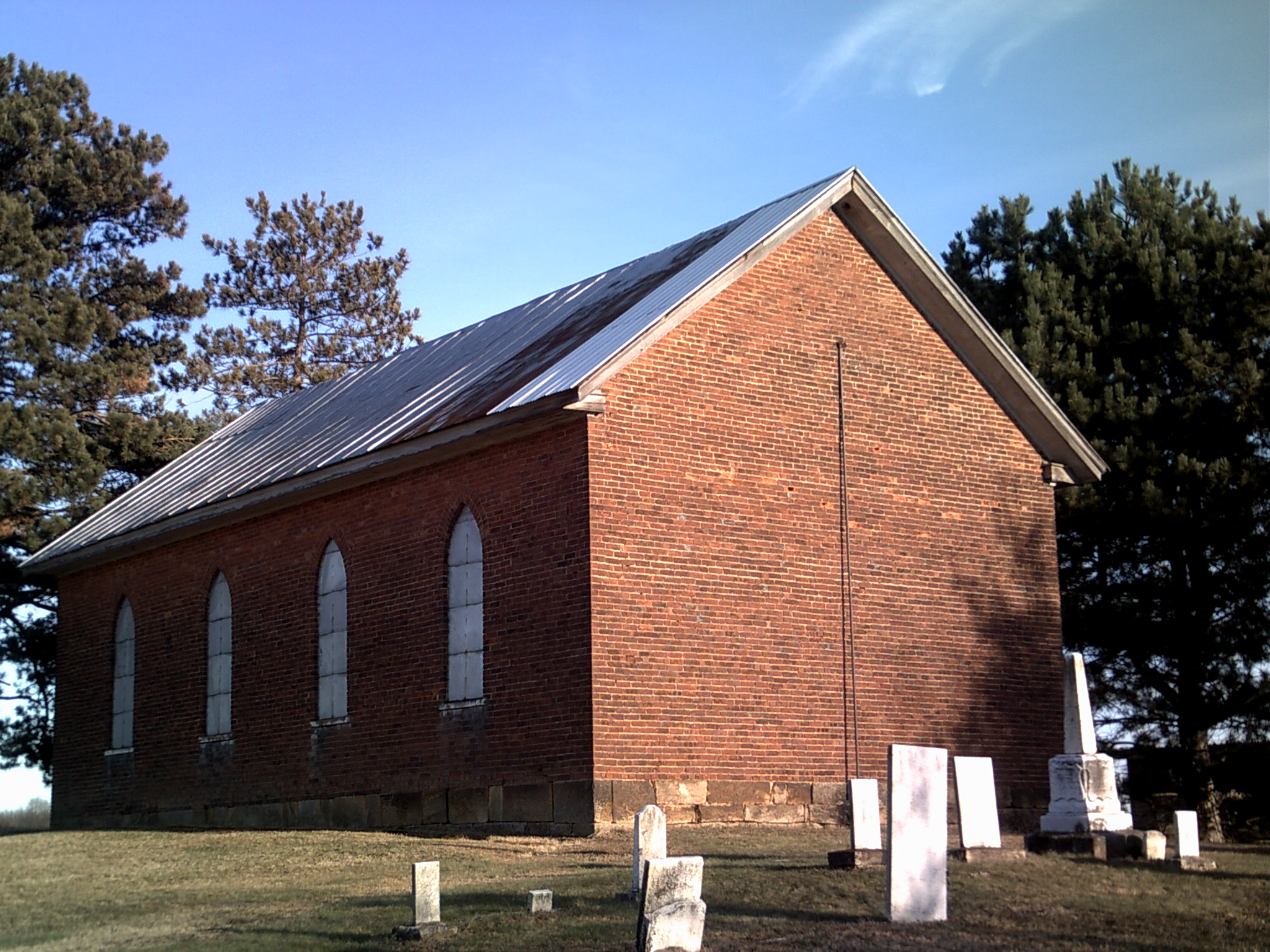
- Rear and north of church in 2009

- Location within Ohio Location within the United States
- Nearest city: Carrollton, Ohio
- Coordinates: 40°27′37″N 81°0′0″W
- Area: 1 acre (0.40 ha)
- Built: 1828
- Architectural style: Gothic Revival
- NRHP reference No.: 95000166
- Added to NRHP: 15 March 1995

Kilgore Union Presbyterian Church is a historic Presbyterian church building in Kilgore, Ohio.

== Description ==
The one story brick church building has a stone foundation and gable front. The entry is a gothic arch with paired narrow two panel doors. An oculus occupies the peak of the gable wall above the door. The sides of the building each have four gothic arched art windows spaced evenly. These windows have stone lug sills. The standing seam metal roof is set off by a narrow cornice with diminutive returns. Original pews, window surrounds and decorative stencilling on the plaster walls are found in the interior.

== History ==
The church was built in 1828 and repaired in 1881 after storm damage. The arches were added to the window openings, the metal roof was added as was a steeple tower. The steeple was removed in the late 1940s when the church had closed due to declining membership. Despite fifty years of disuse the building retained its architectural and historic integrity when the property was added to the National Register of Historic Places on March 15, 1995.

== See also ==
- National Register of Historic Places listings in Carroll County, Ohio
- List of Presbyterian churches in the United States
