= Senator Atkinson =

Senator Atkinson may refer to:

- Archibald Atkinson (1792–1872), Virginia State Senate
- Jason Atkinson (born 1970), Oregon State Senate
- Kelvin Atkinson (born 1969), Nevada State Senate
- Robert Jones Atkinson (1820–1871), Ohio State Senate
