= Jason Roach =

Jason Roach may refer to:

- Jason B. Roach (1829–1906), American politician and physician from Ohio
- Jason Roach (rugby league) (born 1971), rugby league footballer
- Jason Roach (baseball) (born 1976), former Major League Baseball pitcher
- Jason Roach (curler) (born 1984), curler
