= Carroll Electric Cooperative (Ohio) =

Coordinates: 40°34′44″N 81°5′32″W

- Company type: Non-profit rural electric
- Industry: Power utility
- Founded: 1938
- Headquarters: Carrollton, Ohio, U.S.
- Website: www.cecpower.coop/index.php

Carroll Electric Cooperative is a non-profit rural electric utility cooperative headquartered in Carrollton, Ohio. It is one of 25 electric cooperatives that serve the state of Ohio.

The Cooperative was organized in 1938, and the first power lines were energized in December 1939.

As of May 2016, the Cooperative had 1,475 miles (2,374 km) of power lines, and serviced more than 12,400 customers, in portions of six counties in the eastern part of Ohio:

- Carroll
- Columbiana
- Harrison
- Jefferson
- Stark
- Tuscarawas
