= Van Horn Building =

- U.S. National Register of Historic Places
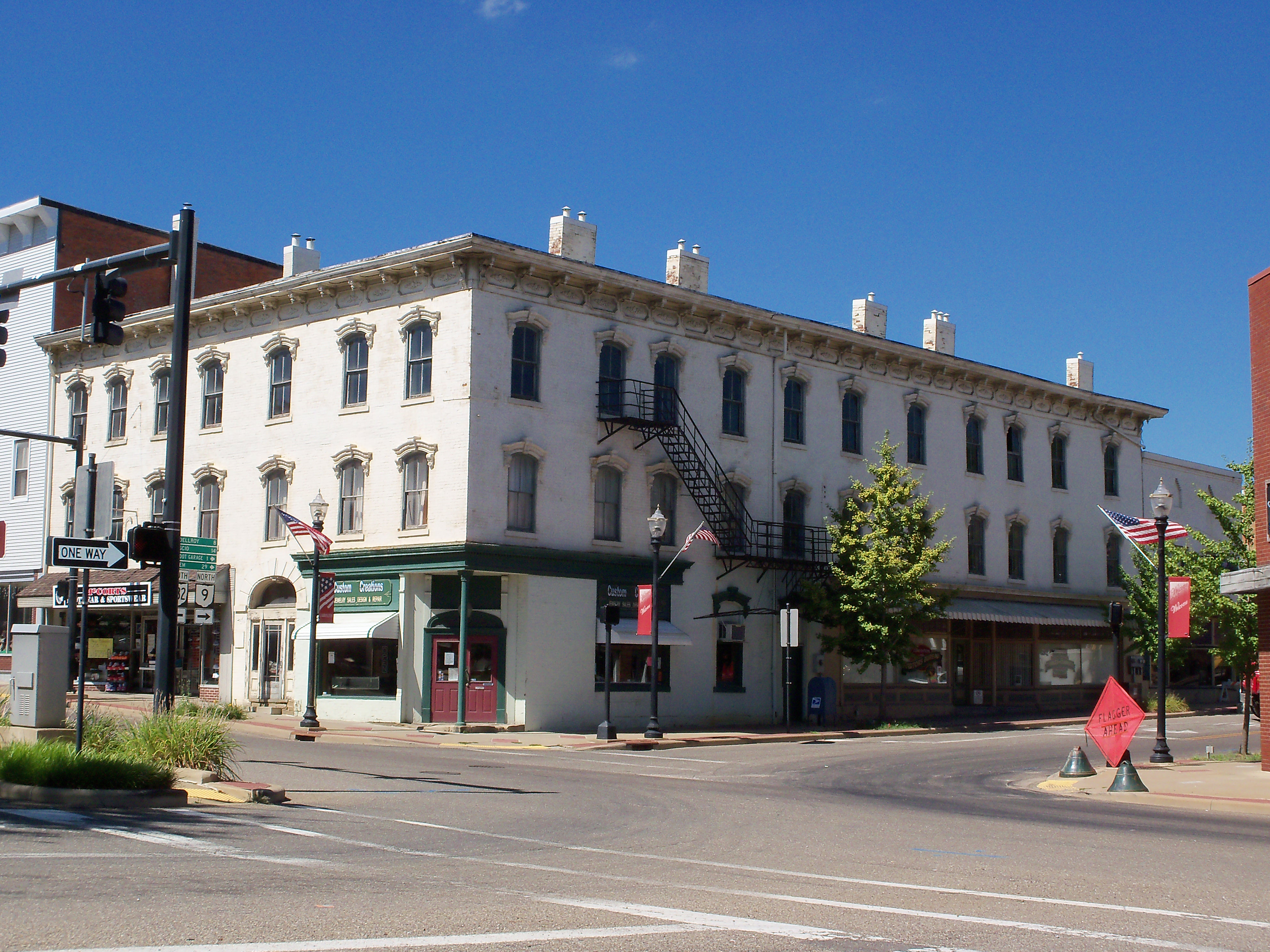
- South and eastern side

- Location within Ohio Location within the United States
- Interactive map showing the location for Van Horn Building
- Location: Public Square at the junction of W. Main and N. Lisbon Sts., Carrollton, Ohio
- Coordinates: 40°34′23″N 81°5′11″W
- Area: Less than 1 acre (0.40 ha)
- Built: 1829
- Architect: John G. Byder
- Architectural style: Italianate
- NRHP reference No.: 87001375
- Added to NRHP: September 3, 1987

The Van Horn Building is a historic commercial building on the public square in central Carrollton, Ohio, United States. Constructed in the 1820s and greatly modified fifty years later, it has been named a historic site.

James Sinclair bought land on the northwestern quadrant of Carrollton's public square in 1828. Although he began to erect the present building in the following year, construction proceeded slowly; the resulting structure did not open for business until 1842. By this time, the location had grown in importance: Carrollton had recently become the county seat of the newly created Carroll County, so residents of surrounding villages and townships had recently begun visiting on governmental and commercial business, while roads to cities such as Cleveland and Canton ran in front of Sinclair's property. The building was acquired in 1876 by Daniel Van Horn, who quickly discovered it to be too small for his needs and agreed with local contractor John Byder to expand his premises. The agreed construction was completed by the end of the year, and the old two-story building now rose three stories into the sky.

Built of brick on a brick foundation, the Van Horn Building is covered with an asphalt roof and features decorative elements of wood and terracotta. The front and side of the building are divided into seven and eleven bays respectively on the second and third stories, while larger display windows occupy much of the first-story facades. Since the renovations of the 1870s, the building has possessed an Italianate appearance, with keystoned terracotta hood molds over the arched windows, large eaves under the overhanging roof, and a terracotta frieze placed under the eaves with supporting wooden modillions.

In 1987, the Van Horn Building was listed on the National Register of Historic Places because of its historically significant architecture; it is Carrollton's oldest commercial building of its size, and it has experienced few changes since it was given the Italianate appearance. It is one of eleven National Register-listed locations in Carroll County; two of the others, the Carroll County Courthouse and the Daniel McCook House, are located on the public square within sight of the Van Horn Building.
