= Amos E. Buss =

American politician (1814–1872)

Member of the Ohio House of Representatives from the Carroll County district
- In office 1860–1862
- Preceded by: Jason B. Roach
- Succeeded by: Leonard Harsh

Personal details
- Born: 1814 New Hampshire, U.S.
- Died: 1872 (aged 57–58)
- Party: Republican
- Spouse: Harriet Adams
- Children: 7
- Occupation: Politician; businessman

Amos E. Buss (1814 – 1872) was an American politician from Ohio. He served as a member of the Ohio House of Representatives, representing Carroll County from 1860 to 1862.

== Early life ==
Amos E. Buss was born in New Hampshire in 1814.

== Career ==
Buss moved to Oneida, Ohio, in 1839. He formed a merchandise business with George Hull. He worked there until his death.

Buss was a Republican. He served as a member of the Ohio House of Representatives, representing Carroll County from 1860 to 1862.

== Personal life ==
Buss married Harriet Adams in New Hampshire. They had seven children, including Frank, Mary and W.D.

Buss died in 1872.
