= 9th Ohio Infantry Regiment =

- Active: 1861–1865
- Country: United States
- Allegiance: Union
- Branch: Union Army
- Type: Infantry
- Size: ~950 soldiers (initial)
- Nickname: Die Neuner (The Niners)
- Engagements: American Civil War: Battle of Rich Mountain; Battle of Carnifex Ferry; Battle of Mill Springs

Commanders
- Notable commanders: Col. Robert L. McCook

The 9th Ohio Infantry Regiment was an infantry regiment that was a part of the Union Army during the American Civil War. The members of the regiment were primarily of German descent and the unit was the first almost all-German unit to enter the Union Army.

== Organization ==
Between 1836 and 1860, four German militia units had been formed in Cincinnati, Ohio. In 1861, in response to a call to arms by President Abraham Lincoln and subsequently by Ohio Governor William Dennison, these units swelled with hundreds of volunteers. Gustav Bergmann, a Cincinnati public school teacher, was the first volunteer to join the unit. The city of Cincinnati gave $250,000.00 for the organization of this unit. Nearly 1,500 men, mostly of German descent, volunteered for the 9th Ohio Infantry Regiment in the first three days. Col. Robert L. McCook, a local lawyer, trained and drilled the new soldiers at Camp Harrison and Camp Dennison, both near the city.

The initial field officers on April 23, 1861, were:

- Colonel Robert L. McCook
- Lieutenant Colonel Karl Sonderson
- Major Frank Mattice
- Surgeon Karl Krause
- Asst. Surgeon Rudolph Wirth
- Adjutant August Willich

The regiment lost six officers and 85 enlisted men killed and mortally wounded during its three-year term of service. It also lost two officers and 60 enlisted men to disease, for a total of 153.

== Battle of Carnifex Ferry ==
The 9th Ohio Infantry Regiment participated in the Battle of Carnifex Ferry, which took place on September 10, 1861. Casualties were eight men killed and two wounded while attacking the Confederate left flank, defended by the 36th Virginia Infantry.

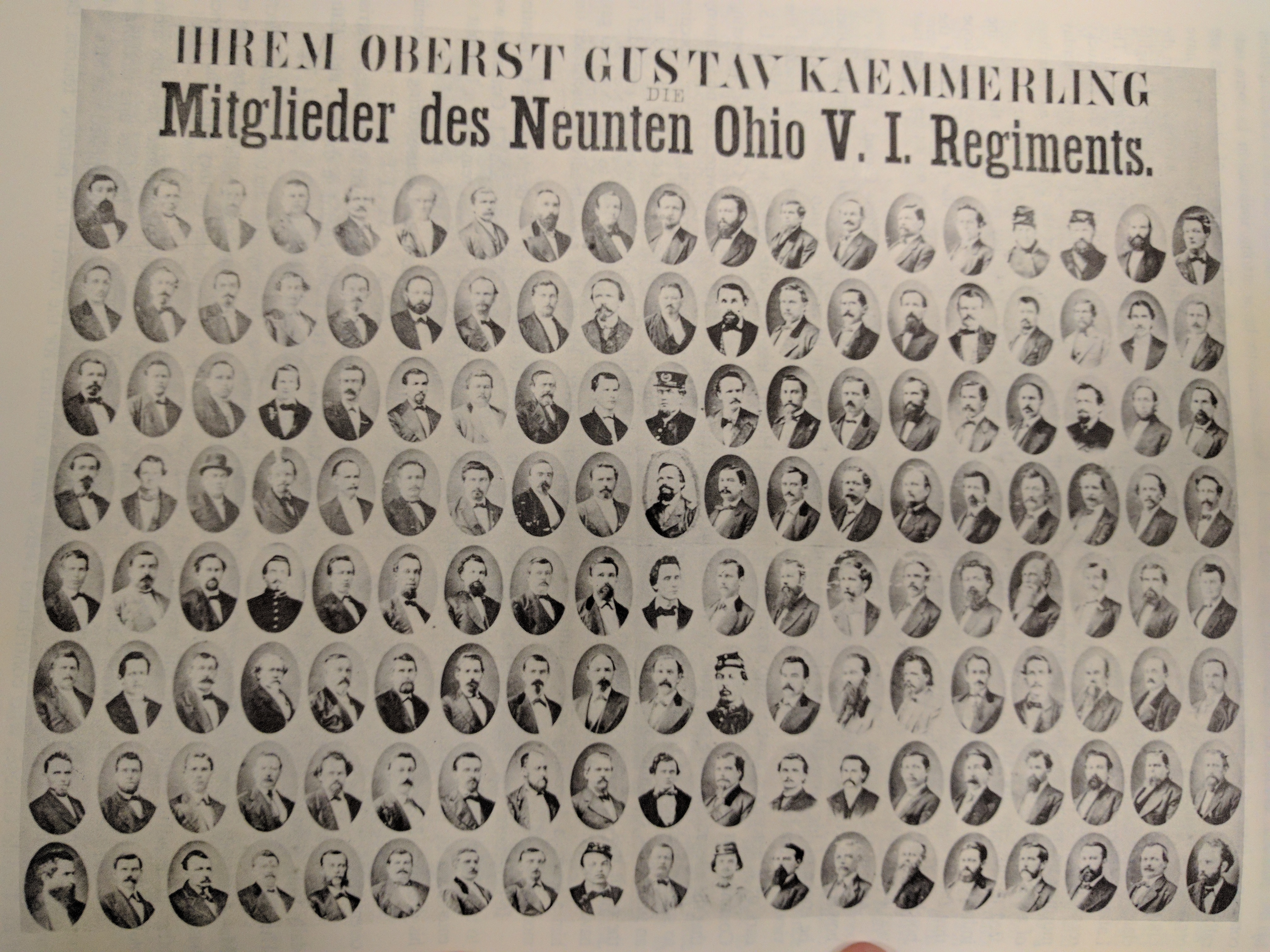
9th Ohio Volunteer Infantry, Turner Hall, Cincinnati, Ohio

== See also ==
- List of Ohio Civil War units
- Ohio in the Civil War
