= Elizabeth Fearne Bonsall =

American painter and illustrator (1861–1956)

Elizabeth Fearne Bonsall (Note: Her first name is also spelled Elisabeth.)
- Born: September 12, 1861; Fernwood, Delaware County, Pennsylvania
- Died: September 25, 1956 (aged 95); Radnor, Pennsylvania
- Education: Pennsylvania Academy of the Fine Arts; Drexel Institute; Académie Colarossi
- Known for: Painter
- Awards: Toppan Prize, Pennsylvania Academy of Fine Arts 1885 Rejected (1876); Mary Smith Prize, Pennsylvania Academy of the Fine Arts 1888, 1897; Colgate & Company poster competition 1897

Elizabeth Fearne Bonsall (September 12, 1861 – September 25, 1956) was an American painter and illustrator. She illustrated The Book of Cats (1903), The Book of Dogs, The Pied Piper of Hamelin (1927), and other books. She created illustrations for Henry Christopher McCook's American Spiders and their Spinningwork. McCook credits her for making most of the illustrations for the volume. Bonsall also created illustrations for magazines. She won several awards for her works between 1885 and 1897.

Bonsall was a student of Howard Pyle and Thomas Eakins and member of The Plastic Club in the United States. In Paris, she studied under Raphaël Collin and Gustave-Claude-Etienne Courtois.

== Personal life ==
Elizabeth Fearne Bonsall was born on September 12, 1861, in Fernwood, Delaware County, Pennsylvania. (Note: The American Art Directory states that she was born in Philadelphia, but Leonard, the Pennsylvania Academy of the Fine Arts, and her 1894 Passport application state that she was born in Fernwood, Delaware County, Pennsylvania.) Her parents were Amos Bonsall and Anna Wagner Bonsall. Amos was a Navy officer and an explorer on a two-year Arctic Expedition (1853–1855) led by Elisha Kane. He served for the Union Army during the Civil War and was later the director of homes for children. Elizabeth's sisters were Ethel, Sarah and Mary.

During her adulthood, she lived at 3430 Walnut Street, Philadelphia. Bonsall believed in woman's right to vote. She was a member of the Presbyterian Church.

== Education ==
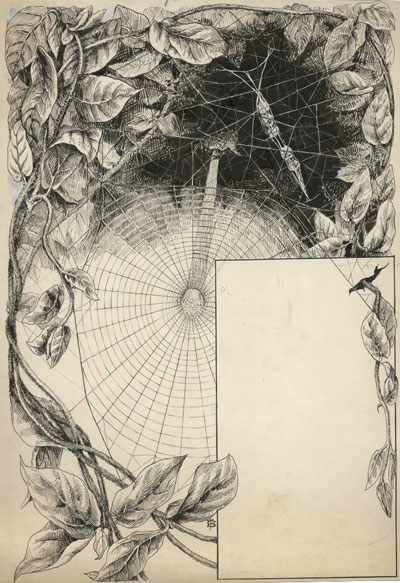
Elizabeth Fearne Bonsall, The labyrinth spider's cocoon string, suspended within the maze above her leaf roofed tent, Henry Christopher McCook's spider atlas, 1893

She studied under Howard Pyle and Thomas Eakins at the Pennsylvania Academy of the Fine Arts, beginning on a scholarship in 1894. She studied with Pyle at Drexel Institute by 1897. (Note: Pyle has a different relationship with his female students than the males. Although he was quite attentive to their training, he often asked them to run errands or relay messages. Bonsall wrote a letter to Charlotte Harding in 1897, at Pyle's request, with an enclosed railroad ticket so that Harding could visit him in Wilmington about her artwork and to run an errand.) Bonsall received the first Toppan Prize in 1885 and won the Mary Smith Prize twice, in 1888 and 1897. In Paris, she studied at Académie Colarossi and under Gustave-Claude-Etienne Courtois and Raphaël Collin.

== Career ==
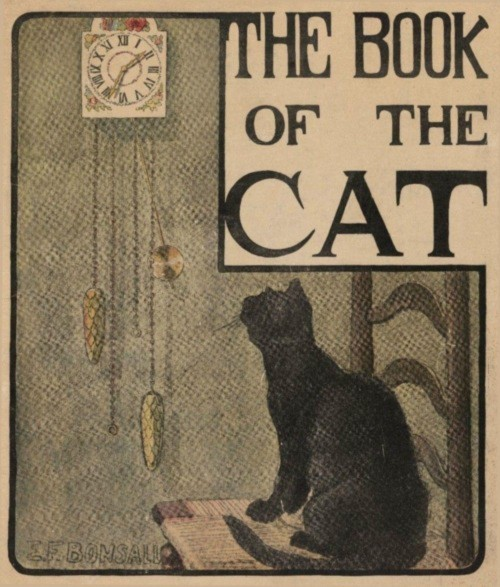
Elizabeth Fearne Bonsall, The Book of the Cat, 1903, cover illustration

Bonsall taught at the Pennsylvania Academy of the Fine Arts. One of her students was Elizabeth Wentworth Roberts.

Bonsall specialized in paintings of animals. She wrote the story Winter at the Zoo, which Bonsall and A. Doring illustrated. It appeared in the November 1892 issue of St. Nicholas Magazine. Bonsall created illustrations of spiders for Henry Christopher McCook's American Spiders and their Spinningwork: A Natural History of the Orbweaving Spiders of the United States, with Special Regard to their Industry and Habits, which was published in 1893. She drew almost all of the spider plates, according to Cook's preface in the atlas.

At the 1897 Pittsburgh International Exhibition of Contemporary Painting and Sculpture, Bonsall exhibited Portrait and Hot Milk. She was a member of The Plastic Club. When its fall exhibition was held in 1898, her work and that of other of Pyle's former students—such as Elizabeth Shippen Green, Jessie Willcox Smith, Charlotte Harding, Violet Oakley, and Angela De Cora—were singled out. A poster of Bonsall's was exhibited in the January 1899 exhibition, and along with works of other club members, gained special attention within the art community. She exhibited at the summer show at the Worcester Art Museum in 1901.

Bonsall illustrated Mabel Humphrey's The Book of the Cat (1903), which is a collection of stories of the adventures of cats and kittens. Of her illustrations, The Book News Monthly wondered if she might be a Rosa Bonheur in the making. In 1904, The Book of the Dog was published with her full-page colored illustrations of Alice Calhoun Haines' stories and verses. Her prints of The Cat and The Dog were sold in Life magazine and The Bookseller, Newsdealer and Stationer in 1905. Elizabeth Shippen Green and Jessie Willcox Smith's illustration of The Child was also sold in both publications that year. Bonsall's illustrations appeared in Harper's Magazine in 1907 and 1908. She illustrated a book for the School for the Deaf entitled Stories in Prose and Rhyme and Nature Lessons for Little Children that was published in 1912. The same year, The Cat was published, edited by Agnes Repplier and illustrated by Bonsall.

Both Elizabeth and Mary Bonsall exhibited at the 1920 exhibition of The Plastic Club. Elizabeth's works were exhibited during Philadelphia's Artists' Week in April 1922.

In 1927, she illustrated The Pied Piper of Hamlin, a Children's Story. The book is the story of the rat-infested town of Hamelin, Germany and the pied piper who lures rodents to the river to drown with the sound of his music. The Delaware Art Museum states of her illustrations, "Bonsall's vivid brushstroke suggests the frenetic scramble at the sound of the piper."

Papers about her career, including exhibition catalogs, artist's statements, publications, brochures, and reviews are held at the Smithsonian Libraries.

== Collections ==
- Chester County History Center, Pennsylvania
  - Amos Bonsall (1830–1915), oil on canvas, circa 1900
  - Portrait of Anne Heacock Bonsall, oil, 1895
- Delaware Art Museum, Wilmington
  - The Pied Piper, gouache on paper, illustration
  - Untitled illustration, gouache on paper, illustration, 1927
- Pennsylvania Academy of the Fine Arts, Philadelphia
  - Hot Milk, Waiting for It to Cool, oil, 1896
