= John James McCook (lawyer) =

American lawyer

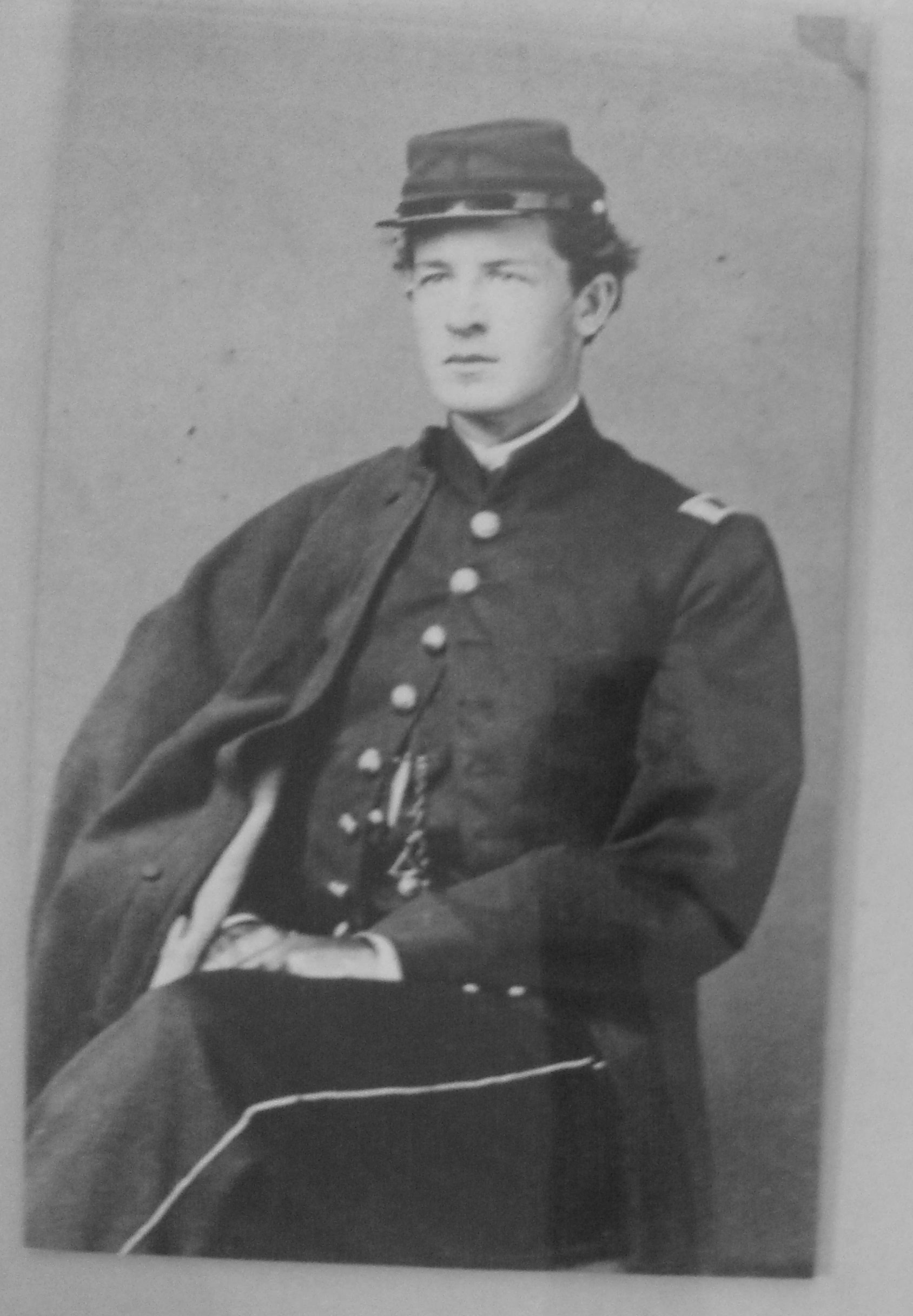
- John James McCook
- Born: May 25, 1845; Carrollton, Ohio
- Died: September 17, 1911 (aged 66); Sea Bright, New Jersey
- Relatives: Daniel McCook (father); John James McCook (uncle)
- Military career
- Allegiance: United States of America; Union
- Branch: (United States) Union Army
- Rank: Captain; Brevet Colonel
- Nickname: Buck
- Units: 52nd Ohio Infantry; 6th Ohio Cavalry
- Conflicts: American Civil War
- Other work: attorney, business director

John James McCook (May 25, 1845 – September 17, 1911) was an American corporate attorney, business director, and soldier, serving as a Union Army officer during the American Civil War. He was the youngest member of the famed "Fighting McCooks," a prominent Ohio military family which contributed fifteen members to the war effort.

== Early years ==
John J. McCook was born in Carrollton, Ohio, to family patriarch Daniel McCook. He was named for his uncle, John James McCook. He enrolled in Kenyon College, but left school after completing his freshman year to enlist as a private in the 52nd Ohio Infantry on August 12, 1862, but was not mustered into the service, initially because of his age. He accompanied the regiment as a volunteer aide-de-camp. On September 12 of that year, he was commissioned as a first lieutenant in the 6th Ohio Cavalry and assigned to the staff of Major General Thomas L. Crittenden in what later became the XXI Corps in the Army of the Cumberland. McCook was involved in several campaigns and battles in the Western Theater, including Perryville, Stones River, the Tullahoma Campaign, Chattanooga, and Chickamauga.

In September 1863, McCook was commissioned as a captain and an aide-de-camp, serving in the Army of the Potomac. He was part of the army of Ulysses S. Grant in the Overland Campaign in Northern Virginia in the spring of 1864. He was severely wounded near Shady Grove, Virginia, during the Battle of Spotsylvania Court House, but recovered, although he never fought again. He received a brevet promotion to major for his "gallant and meritorious" service in that battle. In the omnibus promotions at the end of the war, McCook was breveted as a lieutenant colonel and then a colonel in the volunteer army.

== Post-war years ==
After the war, McCook resumed his studies at Kenyon College and graduated in 1866. He entered the Harvard Law School and graduated in 1869, and later received honorary law degrees from Princeton University and the University of Kansas. He passed his bar exam and established a prosperous legal practice in New York City in the celebrated firm of Alexander & Green, eventually becoming a senior partner. He joined the New York State Bar Association and served on the boards of directors for several prominent insurance companies, railroads, and financial institutions. He was also a trustee of Kenyon College, as well as being a director of the Princeton Theological Seminary. He was instrumental in establishing a formal statute for an intercollegiate system of academic costume, and provided the money in 1892 for the University of Kansas's first athletic stadium, McCook Field, which was in service for thirty years.

The Santa Fe Railroad went into receivership in December 1893, due to rapidly declining stock prices and the failing health of its president, and McCook was one of three men appointed as directors to oversee the struggling railroad as it returned to financial stability.

McCook declined an offer to serve in the first Cabinet of President William McKinley. During the Spanish–American War, he chaired the Army and Navy Christian Commission. He became a close friend of Theodore Roosevelt.

== Death and legacy ==
John McCook died at his summer home in Sea Bright, New Jersey, at the age of 66.

His daughter Susan married into another family with patriotic and legal background when she wed diplomat Peter Augustus Jay

The town of McCook, Illinois, is named after him, as is McCook Street on the campus of the University of Kansas.
