= Henry Christopher McCook =

Union Army chaplain (1837–1911)

Henry McCook
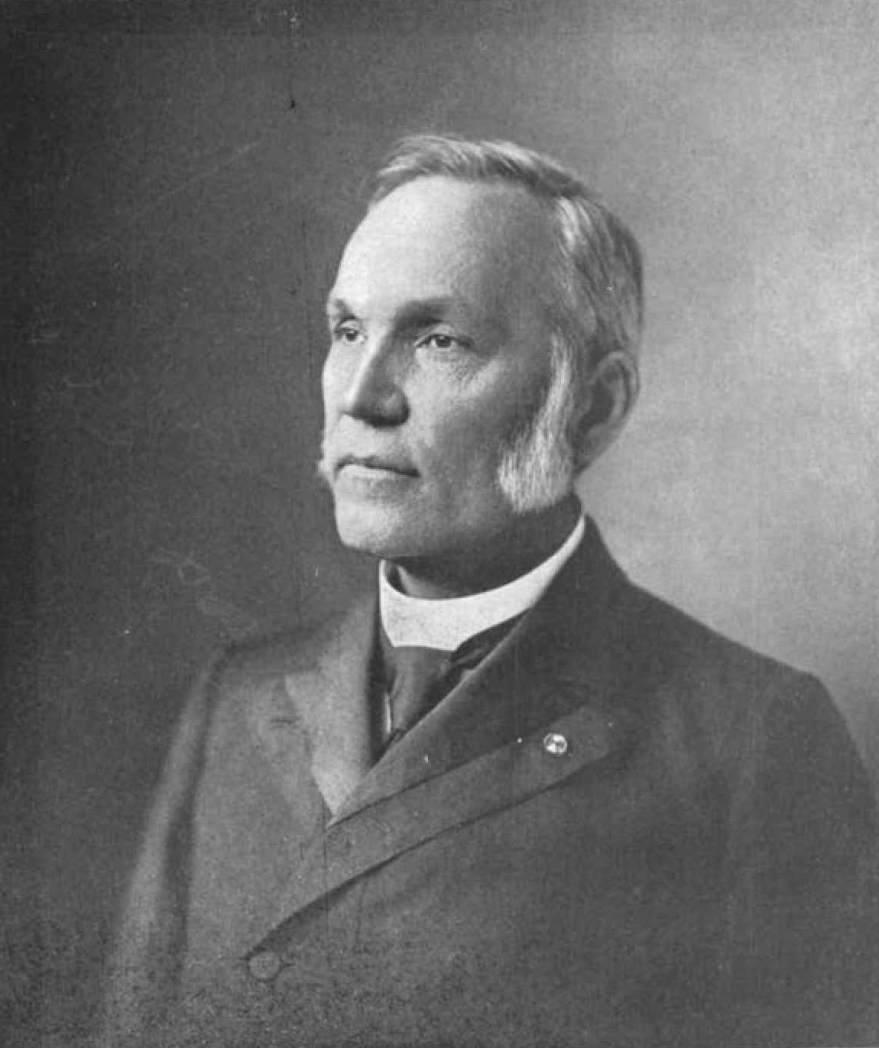
- Born: July 3, 1837; New Lisbon, Ohio
- Died: 1911 (aged 73–74)
- Education: Jefferson College
- Parents: Dr. John McCook (father); Julia McCook (mother)

Henry Christopher McCook (July 3, 1837 – 1911) was an American Presbyterian clergyman, naturalist, and prolific author on religion, history, and nature. He was a member of the celebrated Fighting McCooks, a family of Ohio military officers and volunteers during the American Civil War.

== Life and work ==
McCook was born in New Lisbon, Ohio, to Dr. John McCook and Julia Sheldon McCook. He learned the printing trade as a youth, then taught school for several years and attended Jefferson College. He was a member of the Franklin Literary Society and founded the chapter of Theta Delta Chi at Jefferson College. After graduation in 1859, he studied theology privately and in the Western Theological Seminary in Allegheny, Pennsylvania. With the outbreak of the Civil War, he enlisted in the 41st Illinois Volunteer Infantry Regiment as a chaplain with the rank of first lieutenant and helped tend the wounded. As a minister in Clinton, Illinois, St. Louis, and Steubenville, Ohio, McCook became known for his compassion and intellect, and for his leadership in the movement to create Sunday Schools. In 1869, he became pastor of the Seventh Presbyterian church of Philadelphia, where he lived for the rest of his life.

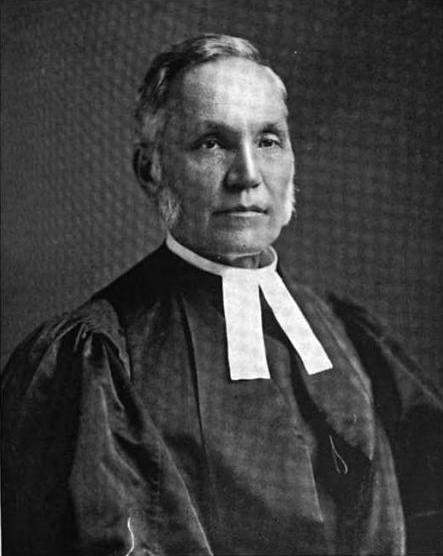
Henry Christopher McCook

He spent his summers studying the behavior of ants and spiders. He published his observations and discoveries in a number of journals and books, as well as in a series of well-received illustrated children's books that explained the insects characteristics and traits in language and drawings for young minds. Many of McCook's books used illustrations drawn by Daniel Carter Beard, the founder of the Boy Scouts of America.

In the summer of 1877, he travelled to Texas to study agricultural ants. Two years later, McCook wrote The Natural History of the Agricultural Ant of Texas. In 1889–93, he published his most ambitious work, American Spiders and Their Spinning Work, in three illustrated volumes. He also wrote a book on his ancestors in the Whiskey Rebellion, and delivered a number of papers on Civil War history at meetings of the Military Order of the Loyal Legion of the United States veterans organization.

McCook was Vice President of both the American Entomological Society and the Academy of Natural Sciences. In 1880, Lafayette College conferred the degree of Doctor of Divinity to McCook. In 1895, he designed the official flag of the city of Philadelphia. He was elected to the American Philosophical Society in 1896. He again served as an Army Chaplain during the Spanish–American War in 1898.

== McCook's works ==
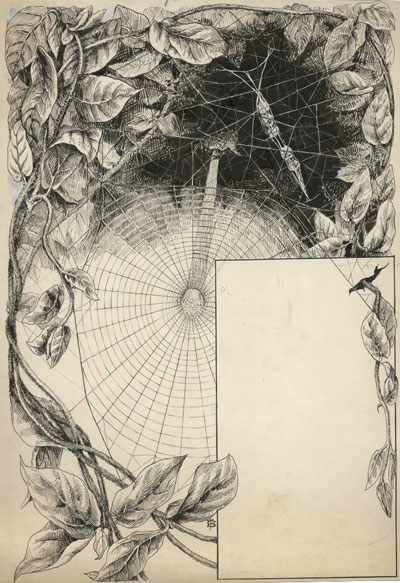
Elizabeth Fearne Bonsall, The labyrinth spider's cocoon string, suspended within the maze above her leaf roofed tent, for Henry Christopher McCook's American Spiders and Their Spinning Work, 1893

- Object and Outline Teaching (1871)
- The Last Year of Christ's Ministry (1871)
- The Last Days of Jesus (1872)
- The Tercentenary Book (1873)
- Mound-Making Ants of the Alleghenies, Their Architecture and Habits (1877)
- The Natural History of the Agricultural Ant of Texas (1879)
- Historic Ecclesiastical Emblems of Pan-Presbyterianism (1880)
- Honey and Occident Ants (1882)
- Tenants of an Old Farm: Leaves From the Note-book of a Naturalist (1884)
- The Women Friends of Jesus (1884)
- The Gospel in Nature (1887)
- American Spiders and Their Spinning Work (1893)
- Old Farm Fairies: A Summer Campaign Against King Cobweaver's Pixies (1895)
- The Latimers: A Tale of the Western Insurrection of 1794 (1897)
- The Senator: A Threnody (life of Marcus A. Hanna) (1905)
- Nature's Craftsmen: Popular Studies of Ants and Other Insects (1907)
- Ant Communities and How They Are Governed: A Study in Natural Civics (1909)
- Prisca of Patmos: A Tale of the Days of St. John I (1911)
