= Jason B. Roach =

American politician (1829–1906)

Member of the Ohio House of Representatives from the Carroll County district
- In office 1858–1860
- Preceded by: Silas Potts
- Succeeded by: Amos E. Buss

Personal details
- Born: June 22, 1829 near Carrollton, Ohio, U.S.
- Died: March 18, 1906 (aged 76) Alliance, Ohio, U.S.
- Party: Republican
- Spouse: Delila Ashbrook
- Children: 4
- Occupation: Politician; physician

Jason B. Roach (June 22, 1829 – March 18, 1906) was an American politician and physician from Ohio. He served as a member of the Ohio House of Representatives, representing Carroll County from 1858 to 1860.

== Early life ==
Jason B. Roach was born on June 22, 1829, near Carrollton, Ohio, to Mary and Samuel Roach. When he was an infant, his family moved to Robertsville. At a young age, he studied cabinetmaking and ornamental painting in Paris and then attended the seminary in Marlboro. He then studied medicine in Augusta.

== Career ==
In 1862, Roach enlisted in Company F of the 126th Ohio Infantry Regiment. He participated in some battles and then worked in the hospital service. He was honorably discharged in August 1865.

Roach was a Republican. He served as a member of the Ohio House of Representatives, representing Carroll County from 1858 to 1860. He also served as justice of the peace for 24 years.

Roach worked as a physician. In 1885, he retired and moved to Alliance.

== Personal life ==
Roach married Delila Ashbrook. They had two sons and two daughters, William M., John A., Olive and Eva.

Roach died on March 18, 1906, in Alliance.
