= Loudon Township, Ohio =

Loudon Township, Ohio, may refer to:

- Loudon Township, Carroll County, Ohio
- Loudon Township, Seneca County, Ohio
