= Carroll County–Tolson Airport =

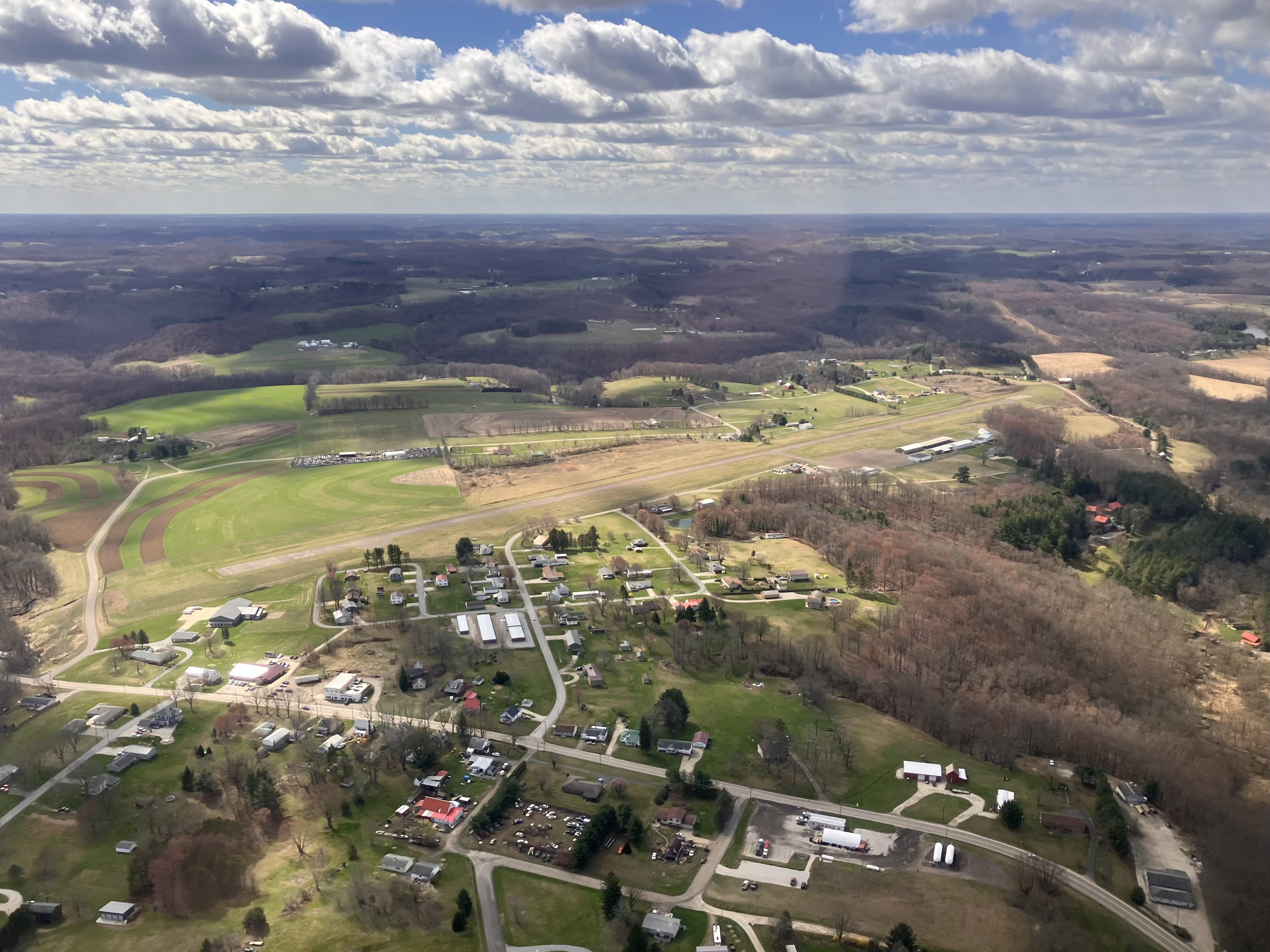
- Aerial view at the pattern altitude

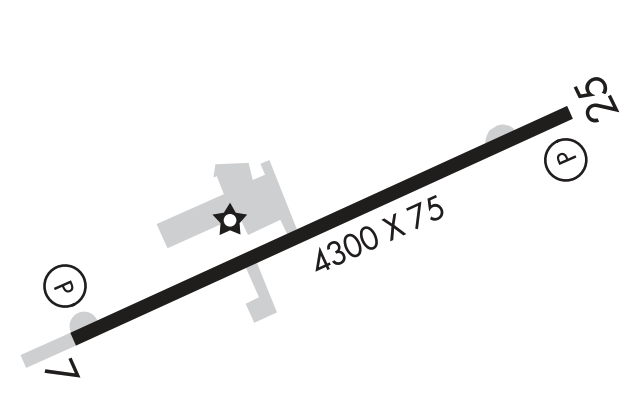
- Airport diagram
- IATA: none; ICAO: KTSO; FAA LID: TSO

Summary
- Airport type: Public
- Owner: Carroll County Airport Authority
- Serves: Carrollton, Ohio
- Location: Carroll County, Ohio
- Time zone: UTC−05:00 (-5)
  - Summer (DST): UTC−04:00 (-4)
- Elevation AMSL: 1,163 ft (354 m)
- Coordinates: 40°33′43″N 081°04′39″W
- Website: tso-apt.com

Map
- Location of airport in Ohio TSO (the United States)

Runways
Direction	Length		Surface
Direction	ft	m	Surface
7/25	4,300	1,311	Asphalt

Statistics (2022)
- Aircraft operations: 14,965
- Based aircraft: 23
- Source: Federal Aviation Administration

Carroll County–Tolson Airport (ICAO: KTSO, FAA LID: TSO) is a county–owned, public-use airport located one nautical mile (1.85 km) southeast of the central business district of Carrollton, a village in Carroll County, Ohio, United States. It is owned by the Carroll County Airport Authority. According to the FAA's National Plan of Integrated Airport Systems for 2009–2013, it is categorized as a general aviation airport.

Although many U.S. airports use the same three-letter location identifier for the FAA and IATA, this airport is assigned TSO by the FAA and no designation from the IATA (which assigned TSO to Tresco Heliport in Tresco, Isles of Scilly, United Kingdom).

== History ==
The first facility on the airport's current site was built by Bill Hill in 1947 for private use. It had a single dirt runway. When Governor James Rhodes decided that all Ohio counties should have an airport in 1966, the approximately 16 acres (6.5 ha) of land on which it sat was donated by Melvin and Frances Tolson to Carroll County.

Fundraising for the airport started in early March 1967. Almost two weeks later, about $24,000 had been donated. The state approved the grant in early May. After initially being awarded in mid June, the only bid to pave the runway was rescinded in early July as it was too expensive. Efforts to reapportion the funds were in process in July. By late August, preparation for paving the runway had begun under a new contractor. A week later, sealing was in progress.

Construction on the 4,300-foot (1,300 m) runway was completed in 1967, and the airport was dedicated on October 8th. The airport had been expanded from 15 acres (6.1 ha) and one runway to 67 acres (27 ha), a hangar, and a terminal area. During the dedication, it was announced the airport would be named Tolson Field.

The airport was featured in a 1968 short film The Door to the World, which featured 11 Ohio county airports.

New aircraft parking ramps were added in 1968, the runway was extended in 1974, and a new hangar was built in 1978. New fuel tanks were installed in 1981.

By early May 1973, the airport administrator, Ada Nichols, was serving meals at the airport.

The ramp area was resurfaced in 2003. The runway was later improved to meet federal aviation standards.

In 2011, the airport received federal funding to pay for safety improvements, including a system to manage stormwater runoff and improve the runway safety area per FAA Standards.

Trees near the airport were cut down in 2022 to protect the runway's safety area. A 2019 federal inspection had identified trees encroaching onto the runway's approach.

== Facilities and aircraft ==
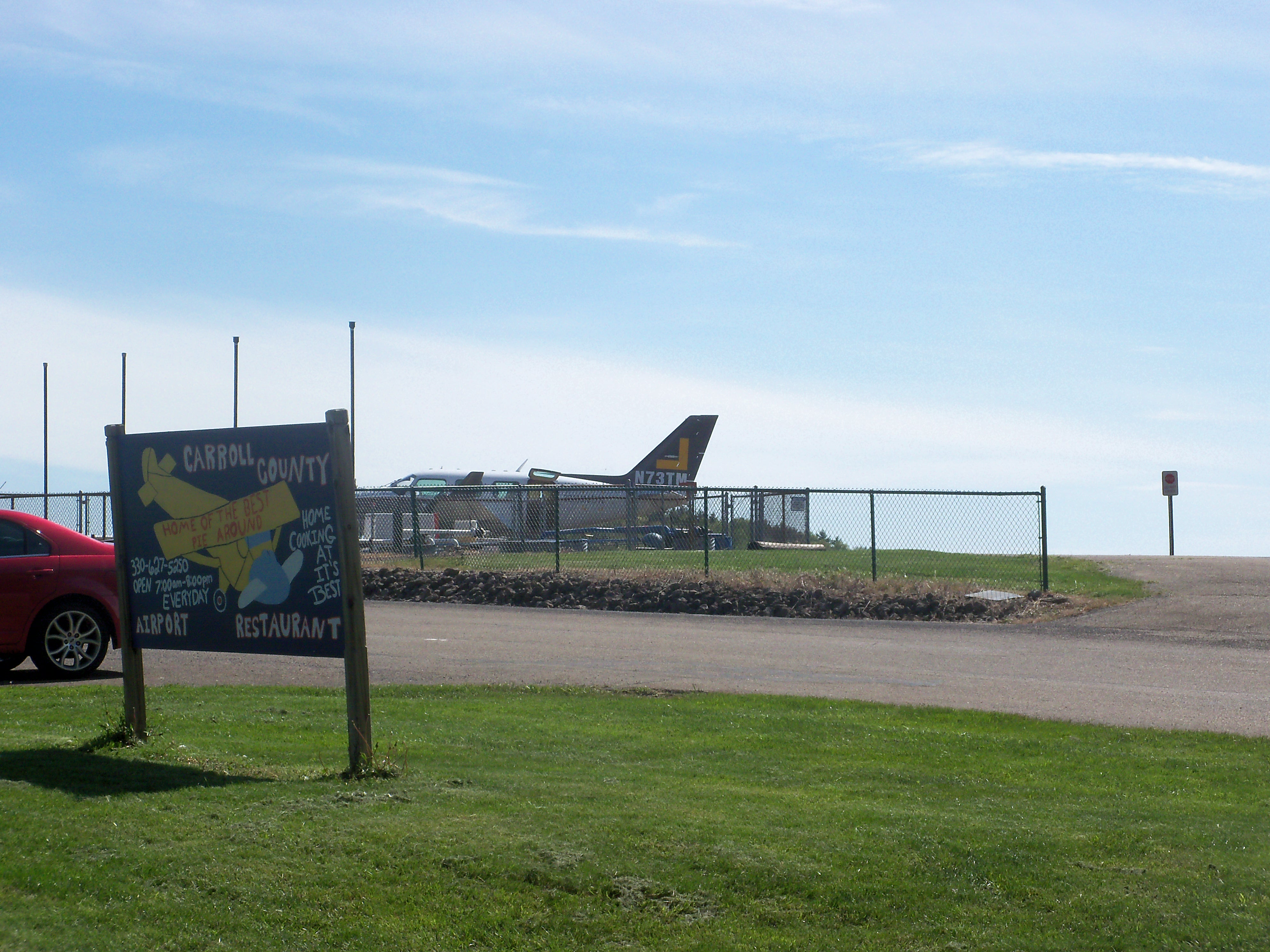
The airport is mainly used by general aviation and includes an onsite restaurant

Carroll County–Tolson Airport covers an area of 68 acres (28 ha) at an elevation of 1,163 feet (354 m) above mean sea level. It has one runway designated 7/25 with an asphalt surface measuring 4,300 by 75 feet (1,311 x 23 m).

For the 12-month period ending September 26, 2022, the aircraft had 14,965 aircraft movements, an average of 41 per day. This was 99% general aviation and <1% military. For the same time period, 23 aircraft were based at the airport: 21 single-engine and 2 multi-engine airplanes.

The airport has a fixed-base operator that sells fuel, both avgas and jet fuel, and offers limited services such as aircraft maintenance, courtesy cars, a crew lounge, and snooze rooms.

The airport has a family-owned restaurant on the field that allows diners to watch aircraft takeoff and land.

== Accidents and incidents ==
- On March 24, 1996, a Piper PA-28 impacted a hangar and terrain on an attempted go-around at Carroll County-Tolsen Airport. Winds at the time of the accident were from the south at 15 knots with gusts to 20 knots. After aborting its landing, the aircraft was observed making a near-vertical turn before descending and impacting a hangar. The probable cause of the accident was found to be the pilot's inadequate compensation for the crosswind condition, his failure to maintain directional control, and his failure not raise the landing flaps during the go-around.
- On September 10, 2000, a Grumman AA-5B was substantially damaged after it collided with trees during an aborted landing at the Carroll County-Tolsen Airport. After an instrument approach to 400' AGL, the aircraft touched down halfway down the runway with a ground speed 20 to 30 knots faster than normal. The pilot added power to abort the landing, and the engine responded normally. The pilot then entered right traffic to attempt another landing on runway 7. The airplane touched down 300 feet past the landing threshold, again faster than "normal." The pilot raised the flaps, and applied the brakes. The tires locked and the airplane started to skid, surprising the pilot, who reduced brake pressure to allow the brakes to roll again. About 2/3 down the runway, the pilot realized he could not stop the airplane within the remaining runway. He advanced the throttle, and the engine responded "normally." He lowered the flaps to 10-degrees, and the airplane started to climb. The pilot subsequently saw two hills at the end of the runway, one on the extended centerline and the other just to the right. Knowing the airplane would not clear the taller hill, the pilot turned right to fly over the smaller one. When the pilot realized the airplane would not even clear this hill, he elected to crash straight ahead, fearing a turn would stall the airplane. After the accident, the pilot believed to be landing with a tailwind. The probable cause of the accident was found to be the pilot's improper decision to delay the aborted landing, which resulted in an insufficient airspeed during climb and subsequent collision with terrain.
- On September 22, 2007, a Beechcraft C23 Musketeer nosed over during a forced landing following a partial loss of engine power in the traffic pattern at the Carroll County – Tolson Airport. On the downwind leg, the pilot reduced engine power to initiate a descent. The aircraft descended below glide path on the base leg, and the engine did not respond to multiple throttle inputs and continued to operate at 1,500 rpm regardless of throttle position. The airplane was too low to reach the airport, so the pilot made a forced landing to a cornfield, at which time the airplane nosed over. Twelve gallons of fuel were drained from the airplane after the accident. The fuel selector was positioned on the left tank, the mixture control was mid-travel, and the carburetor heat was "off." A post accident inspection did not reveal any anomalies consistent with a loss of engine power, though data indicated the possibility of moderate carburetor icing at cruise power and serious icing at descent power under those conditions. Thus the probable cause of the accident was found to be the partial loss of engine power during approach due to carburetor ice and the uneven terrain encountered during the forced landing which caused the airplane to nose over.
- On October 24, 2012, a Cessna 150 struck multiple deer while taking off from Carroll County – Tolson Airport. The airplane struck one deer with the propeller and the second deer with the right horizontal stabilizer. The pilot was able to maintain control of the airplane and taxied back to the ramp without further incident. The probable cause of the accident was found to be the airplane’s collision with two deer during the takeoff roll.
- On April 24, 2016, a Cessna 182L Skylane crashed after departure from the Carroll County – Tolson Airport. While the pilot was transitioning to cruise flight, the aircraft changed course, altitude, and speed multiple times before a gradual decrease in altitude and airspeed and subsequent crash. The cause for the in-flight collision with trees and terrain could not be determined.
- On April 24, 2021, a Cessna 310 landed with its landing gear improperly configured at the Carroll County–Tolson Airport. The Airline Transport Pilot aboard reported that, while on downwind in the traffic pattern, he lowered the landing gear handle and verbally announced “gear down.” He looked at the cockpit indications to verify the landing gear was down and locked; however, he then shifted his attention outside of the cockpit to visually scan for three aircraft approaching and entering the traffic pattern. He reported that he did not confirm the landing gear was down and locked, as he was distracted with scanning for the other traffic. During landing, the landing gear collapsed, and the bottom of the fuselage sustained substantial damage.

== See also ==
- List of airports in Ohio
