= Patrick Hull House =

- U.S. National Register of Historic Places
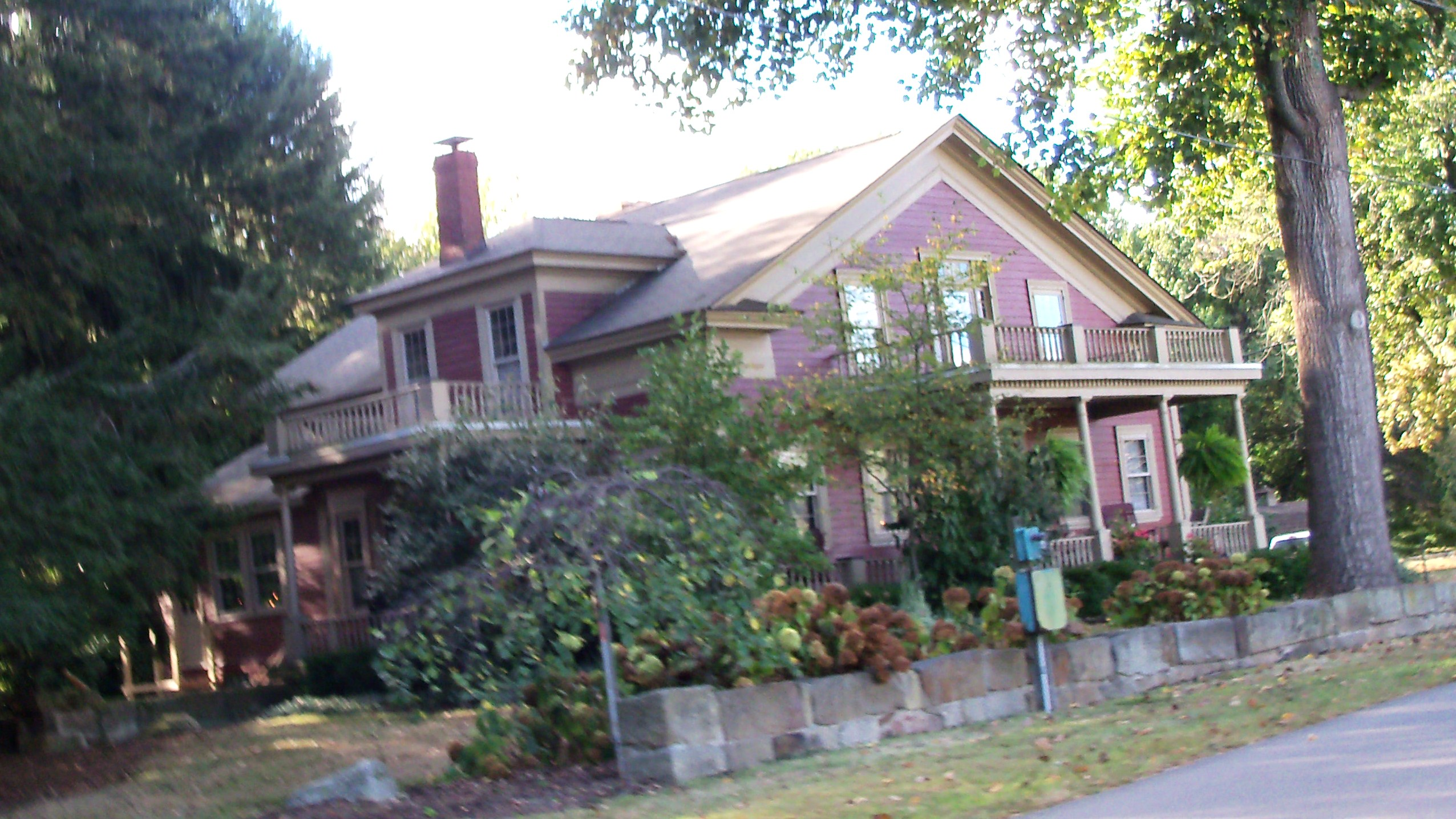
- Roadside view of the house

- Location within Ohio Location within the United States
- Location: 8187 Blade Rd., Oneida, Ohio
- Coordinates: 40°42′7″N 81°9′6″W
- Area: 1 acre (0.40 ha)
- Architect: Henry Bever
- Architectural style: Greek Revival
- NRHP reference No.: 82001362
- Added to NRHP: December 15, 1982

The Patrick Hull House is a historic residence in rural Carroll County, Ohio, United States, near the community of Oneida. Constructed in the 1830s for a leading resident of the area, it has been named a historic site.

George and Patrick Hull were natives of Oneida County, New York who settled in present-day Carroll County in 1834. Soon after purchasing land along Sand Creek in present-day Brown Township, they contracted with local lumber-mill owner Henry Bever to construct a large gristmill on the creek to grind buckwheat. As no other buckwheat mills were located nearby, a community grew up around the mill, and the brothers named the new locality "Oneida" after their native county. As the community miller and landowner, Patrick Hull quickly became a local dignitary, and by 1837, he was ready to live in a house larger than those of his neighbors. Construction of the house was again the responsibility of Bever, and the finished house demonstrates the influence of both parties. On one hand, the house features elements of the popular Greek Revival style of architecture. However, the design is significantly different from the cultured Greek Revival buildings seen farther east, and Bever's modifications of the style clearly demonstrate the necessity of interpreting the style for local needs.

The house itself is a weatherboarded structure two stories tall. Different sections of the house have different roof styles: the east-facing front rises to a gable, five bays wide on the first story and three on the second, while a projection on the southern side is covered with a hip roof. Porches shelter parts of the front and southern sides, and numerous shuttered windows, many six-over-six, are placed throughout the facade. The main entrance pierces the gabled front section; situated in the central bay of the first story, it is surrounded by sidelights and a transom light. Components of the facade demonstrate both the Greek Revival origins of the design and its vernacular interpretation: fluted columns in the Doric order support the porch roof, but the bottom section of the gable's pediment is interrupted by all three second-story windows.

Shortly before Christmas 1982, the Patrick Hull House was listed on the National Register of Historic Places; it qualified because of its place in local history, because it was a rare surviving example of the houses of wealthy men of the period and because it represented the combined influences of high-style architecture and rustic needs. The Hull House is one of eleven National Register-listed sites countywide.
