= McCook =

McCook may refer to:

== People ==
- McCook (surname)

== Places ==
United States

- McCook, Illinois
- McCook, Nebraska
- McCook, Texas
- McCook County, South Dakota
- McCook Field, Ohio
- McCook (Amtrak station), Nebraska
- McCook Army Airfield, Nebraska
- McCook Regional Airport, Nebraska

== Other uses ==
- USS McCook, two different U.S. Navy ships
