= Edwin Stanton McCook =

American military officer and politician

Edwin McCook
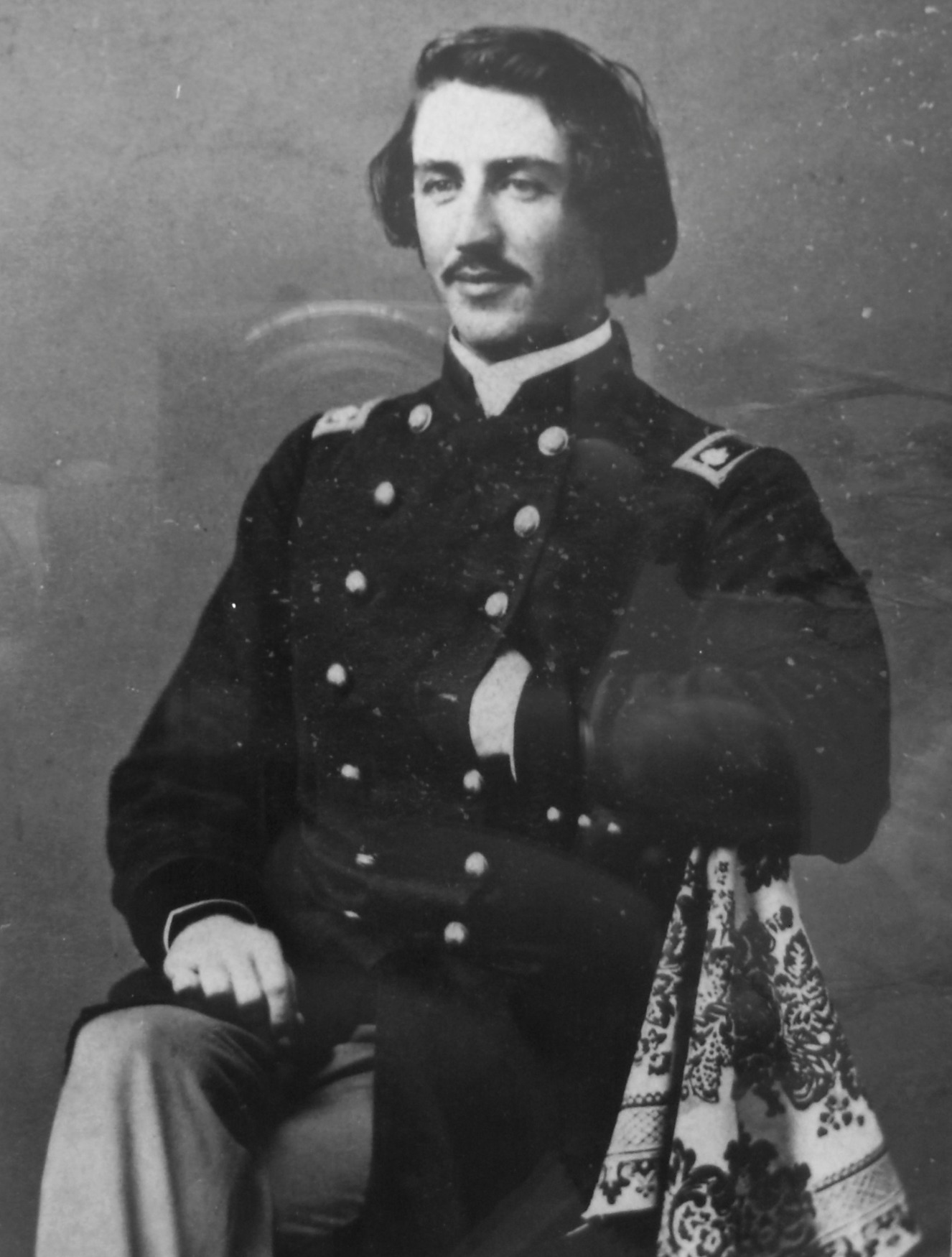

Governor of the Dakota Territory
- Acting; April 1873 – September 11, 1873
- Preceded by: John A. Burbank
- Succeeded by: John A. Burbank

Personal details
- Born: Edwin Stanton McCook; March 26, 1837 Carrollton, Ohio, U.S.
- Died: September 11, 1873 (aged 36) Yankton, Dakota Territory, U.S. (now South Dakota)
- Cause of death: Assassination by gunshots
- Resting place: Spring Grove Cemetery
- Party: Republican
- Relatives: Daniel McCook (father); Fighting McCooks
- Education: United States Naval Academy

Military service
- Allegiance: United States • Union
- Branch/service: Union Army
- Years of service: 1861–1865
- Rank: Colonel; Brevet Major General
- Commands: 31st Illinois Infantry Regiment
- Battles/wars: American Civil War

Edwin Stanton McCook (March 26, 1837 – September 11, 1873) was an American soldier and politician. A Union Army officer during the American Civil War and a postbellum politician in the Dakota Territory, he was assassinated in office while serving as acting governor on September 11, 1873.

== Biography ==
One of a famous family of Civil War officers, the "Fighting McCooks," he was born in Carrollton, Ohio, a son of Daniel McCook. He was educated at the United States Naval Academy at Annapolis, Maryland, and was a member of the Naval Lodge #69 of the Freemasons in New York City.

When the Civil War erupted, McCook recruited a company and joined the 31st Illinois Infantry, serving under his friend, Col. John A. Logan. He saw action in the battles of Fort Henry and Fort Donelson, where he was severely wounded. He was later assigned to command Logan's brigade when the latter assumed division command. By the Vicksburg Campaign, McCook had again been promoted to replace Logan as division commander, leading it during the Siege of Vicksburg under Ulysses S. Grant. In 1864, he served with distinction in the Chattanooga and Atlanta campaigns and in the March to the Sea under William T. Sherman. He was severely wounded three separate times but survived the war.

On January 13, 1866, President Andrew Johnson nominated McCook for appointment to the grade of brevet brigadier general of volunteers, to rank from March 13, 1865, and the United States Senate confirmed the appointment on March 12, 1866. On April 16, 1867, the United States Senate confirmed McCook's nomination for appointment to the grade of brevet major general of volunteers to rank from March 13, 1865.

== Political career ==
After the war, he moved out west and was named as Secretary of the Dakota Territory in 1872. McCook was appointed acting governor of Dakota Territory in spring 1873 to replace the corrupt John A. Burbank.

== Death ==
On September 11, 1873, McCook was shot and killed by Peter P. Wintermute, a banker and political adversary, at a public meeting being held in at the St. Charles Hotel (site of the present Charles Gurney Hotel) in Yankton, Dakota Territory. Wintermute was upset with McCook's stance in the Dakota Southern Railroad dispute.

=== Trial ===
However, the actual shooting erupted after a personal slight: Wintermute asked McCook for a cigar and was refused, after which Wintermute felt insulted and challenged McCook to a fight; McCook, large and well-built, laughed at Wintermute, who was described as being of small build. Wintermute then declared that he could shoot McCook, who responded by reportedly punching him, tossing him around, and rubbing his face in the contents of a spittoon. Wintermute declared he would get even, borrowed a pistol from a friend, and shot McCook four times in the chest at close range as he returned from washing his hands. McCook was reportedly able to still attack Wintermute, and needed to be restrained so medical care could be provided; he died the following day from blood loss. Wintermute was tried, convicted and sentenced to 10 years for manslaughter, but obtained a new trial and was acquitted in Vermillion—due to the chaotic and confusing chain of events.

=== Burial ===
McCook was buried in Spring Grove Cemetery in Cincinnati, Ohio, along with several other members of the famed family. His grave can be located in Section 10, Lot 1.

== Honors ==
McCook County, South Dakota, is named for him.

== See also ==
- List of American Civil War brevet generals (Union)
- List of assassinated American politicians

== Notes ==
Political offices
Preceded by John A. Burbank	Governor of the Dakota Territory; Acting; 1873	Succeeded by John A. Burbank
