= Oneida, Ohio =

Unincorporated community in Ohio, U.S.

Coordinates: 40°41′55″N 81°08′56″W

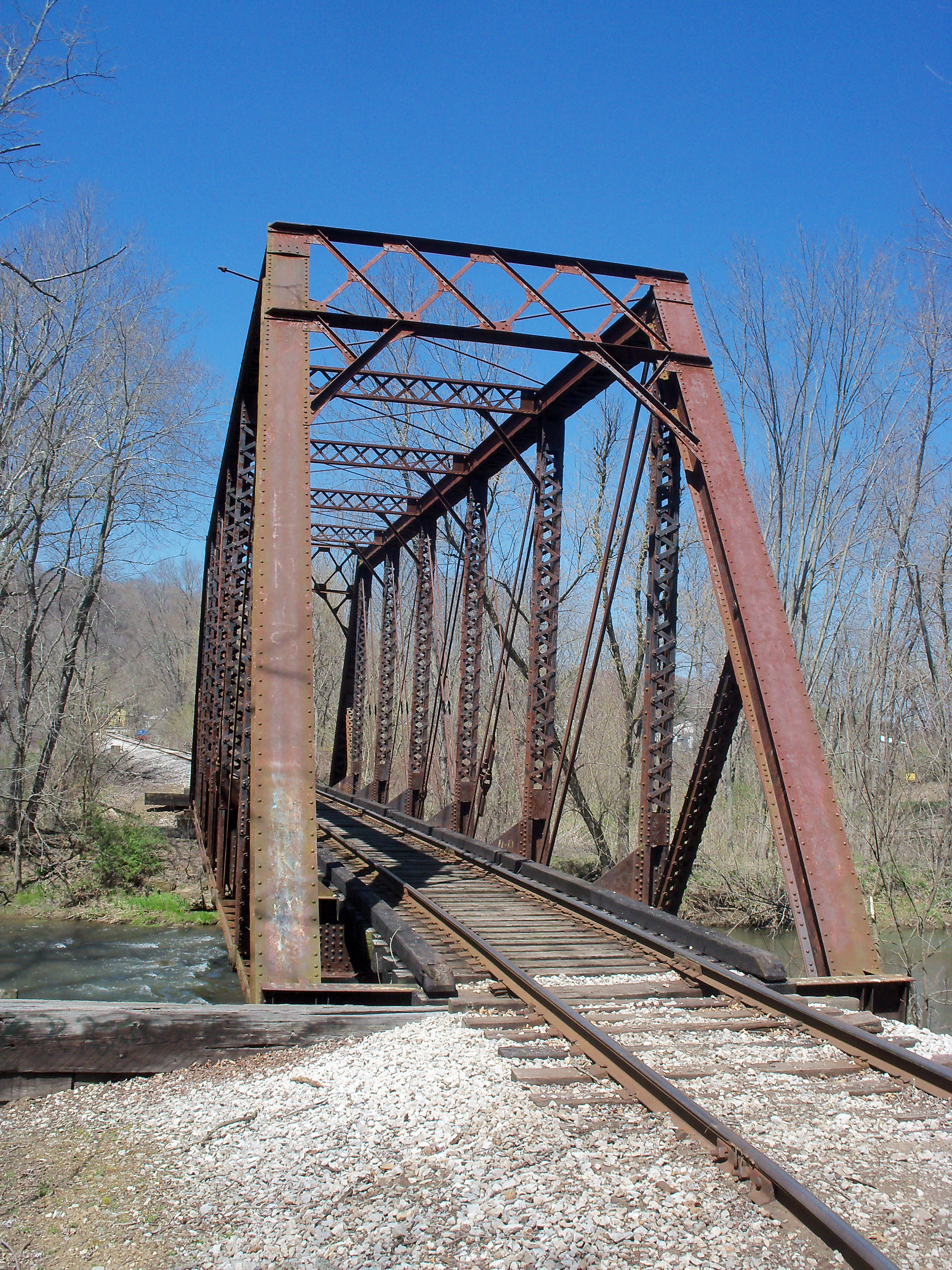
W&LE bridge over Sandy Creek in Oneida

Oneida is an unincorporated community in Carroll County, in the U.S. state of Ohio.

== History ==
Oneida sprang up around 1840 when a mill was built at that point. The community takes its name from Oneida County, New York, the native home of the mill's proprietor. A post office called Oneida Mills was established in 1851, the name was changed to Oneida in 1899, and the post office closed in 1918.

The Patrick Hull House in Oneida is listed on the National Register of Historic Places.

== Notable people ==
- Amos E. Buss (1814–1872), member of the Ohio House of Representatives
