= Robert Jones Atkinson =

American politician

President of the Ohio Senate
- In office January 2, 1854 – January 6, 1856
- Preceded by: George Rex
- Succeeded by: Robert Walker Tayler

Personal details
- Born: June 20, 1820 Carrollton, Ohio
- Died: February 25, 1871 (aged 50) Washington, D.C.
- Resting place: Grandview Cemetery, Carrollton, Ohio
- Party: Democratic
- Spouse: Matilda Jackson
- Children: three sons, three daughters

Robert Jones Atkinson (1820-1871) was a Democratic politician from the state of Ohio, United States. He was President of the Ohio Senate in 1854, and was an appointed official in the United States Department of the Treasury 1854 to 1864.

== Early life and education ==
Atkinson was born in Carrollton, Ohio in 1820 to Isaac and Hester (Jones) Atkinson.

== Career ==
He began as a clerk in Carrollton. He was elected to the Ohio State Senate to serve a term starting in 1852. The legislature met for a session in 1852 and another in 1853. He was re-elected, and served in the 1854 session. On January 2, 1854, the Senate elected Atkinson as President pro tem over Wiliam Lawrence by vote of 22 to 7. The Senate adjourned May 1, 1854.

In 1854, Atkinson was appointed Third Auditor of the U.S. Department of the Treasury. He assumed office August 28, 1854 and was not replaced until July 18, 1864. In 1866, Atkinson was appointed attorney and counselor to the United States Supreme Court. He died in Washington in 1871.

== Personal life ==
Atkinson married Matilda Jackson of Carrollton, Ohio. They had three sons and three daughters. Two sons were bankers in Montana, and the other worked at the U.S. Department of the Treasury. Robert and Matilda Atkinson are buried at Grandview Cemetery in Carrollton, Ohio. He was a Democrat, a Freemason and a Presbyterian.

== Notes ==
Ohio Senate
Preceded by New district	Senator from 21st District; 1852-1854	Succeeded by Herman Canfield
Political offices
Preceded by Francis Burt	Third Auditor of the United States Treasury; August 28, 1854 - July 18, 1864	Succeeded by Elijah Sells
