= 52nd Ohio Infantry Regiment =

- Active: August 1862 to June 3, 1865
- Country: United States
- Allegiance: Union
- Branch: Union Army
- Type: infantry
- Engagements: Battle of Richmond; Battle of Perryville; Battle of Stones River; Battle of Chickamauga; Battle of Missionary Ridge; Atlanta campaign; Battle of Resaca; Battle of Kennesaw Mountain; Siege of Atlanta; Battle of Jonesboro; Sherman's March to the Sea; Carolinas campaign; Battle of Bentonville

The 52nd Ohio Infantry Regiment was an infantry regiment in the Union Army during the American Civil War.

== Service ==
The 52nd Ohio Infantry Regiment was organized at Camp Dennison near Cincinnati, Ohio in August 1862 and mustered in for three years service under the command of Colonel Daniel McCook, Jr.

The regiment was attached to 36th Brigade, 11th Division, Army of the Ohio, to October 1862. 36th Brigade, 11th Division, III Corps, Army of the Ohio, to November 1862. 2nd Brigade, 4th Division, Center, XIV Corps, Army of the Cumberland, to January 1863. 2nd Brigade, 4th Division, XIV Corps, to June 1863. 2nd Brigade, 2nd Division, Reserve Corps, Department of the Cumberland, to October 1863. 3rd Brigade, 2nd Division, XIV Corps, to June 1865.

The 52nd Ohio Infantry mustered out of service at Washington, D.C., on June 3, 1865.

== Detailed service ==
Left Ohio for Lexington, Ky., August 25. March to relief of General Nelson August 29 – September 1. Action at Richmond August 30. Kentucky River August 31. Lexington September 2. Pursuit of Bragg to Crab Orchard. Ky., October 3–15. Battle of Perryville, Ky., October 8. March to Nashville, Tenn., October 16 – November 7. Action at Mitchellsville November 5. Duty at Nashville, Tenn., until March 1863. Escort ammunition trains to Stones River December 28–30, 1862. Moved to Brentwood, Tenn., March 1863, and duty there until June 5. Moved to Murfreesboro, Tenn., and duty there until July 16. Garrison duty at Nashville, Tenn., until August 20. March to Bridgeport, Ala., via Franklin, Columbia, Athens and Huntsville. August 20 – September 14. Battle of Chickamauga, September 19–21. Duty in Lookout Valley until November 6. (Temporarily attached to 3rd Brigade, 2nd Division, XI Corps.) At Chickamauga Creek until November 24. Chattanooga-Ringgold Campaign November 24–27. Tunnel Hill November 24–25. Missionary Ridge November 25. Pursuit to Graysville November 26–27. March to relief of Knoxville, Tenn., November 28 – December 18. At North Chickamauga and McAffee's Church, Ga., until May 1864. Demonstration on Dalton February 22–27. Tunnel Hill, Buzzard's Roost Gap and Rocky Faced Ridge February 23–25. Atlanta Campaign May to September. Tunnel Hill May 6–7. Demonstration on Rocky Faced Ridge May 8–11. Buzzard's Roost Gap May 8–9. Battle of Resaca May 14–15. Rome May 17–18. Operations on line of Pumpkin Vine Creek and battles about Dallas, New Hope Church and Allatoona Hills May 25 – June 5. Operations about Marietta and against Kennesaw Mountain June 10 – July 2. Pine Hill June 11–14. Lost Mountain June 15–17. Assault on Kennesaw June 27. Ruff's Station, Smyrna Camp Ground, July 4. Chattahoochie River July 5–17. Peachtree Creek July 19–20. Siege of Atlanta July 22 – August 25. Utoy Creek August 5–7. Flank movement on Jonesboro August 25–30. Battle of Jonesboro August 31 – September 1. Lovejoy's Station September 2–6. Operations against Hood in northern Georgia and northern Alabama September 29 – November 3. March to the sea November 15 – December 10. Louisville November 30. Siege of Savannah December 10–21. Campaign of the Carolinas January to April 1865. Taylor's Hole Creek, Averasboro, N. C., March 16. Battle of Bentonville March 19–21. Occupation of Goldsboro March 24. Advance on Raleigh April 10–14. Bennett's House April 26. Surrender of Johnston and his army. March to Washington, D. C, via Richmond, Va., April 29 – May 20. Grand Review of the Armies May 24.

== Casualties ==
The regiment lost a total of 270 men during service; 7 officers and 94 enlisted men killed or mortally wounded, 1 officer and 168 enlisted men died of disease.

== Commanders ==
- Colonel Daniel McCook
- Lieutenant Colonel Daniel D. T. Cowan – commanded at the battles of Perryville and Stones River
- Major James T. Holmes – commanded at the battle of Chickamauga

== Notable members ==
- Samuel Grimshaw – Medal of Honor recipient
- Howell B. Treat – Medal of Honor recipient
- Dr. Mary Edwards Walker, assistant surgeon – first female U.S. Army surgeon and only female Medal of Honor recipient

== See also ==
- List of Ohio Civil War units
- Ohio in the Civil War
