= Daniel McCook House =

Historic house in Ohio, United States

- U.S. National Register of Historic Places
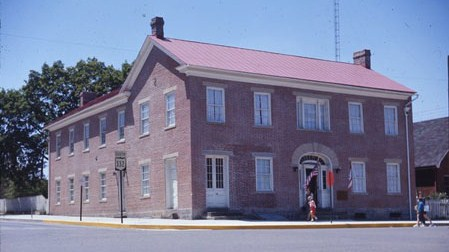

- Location within Ohio Location within the United States
- Interactive map showing the location of Daniel McCook House
- Location: Public Sq., Carrollton, Ohio
- Coordinates: 40°34′19″N 81°5′14″W
- Area: less than one acre
- Architectural style: Federal
- NRHP reference No.: 70000486
- Added to NRHP: November 10, 1970

The Daniel McCook House is a historic antebellum house in Carrollton, Ohio, that was home to several of the "Fighting McCooks" who rose to fame during the American Civil War. The patriarch, Daniel McCook Sr., was a major in the Union Army as well as a paymaster, and his sons rose to military prominence during the war.

The building is on the southwest corner of the Carrollton Public Square. Built in 1837, it is a perfect example of the popular Federal architecture. Its central door is framed by white side windows and a fan window above. A light sandstone arch surmounts the frame. The hipped roof is framed on both sides by two large chimneys.

The building became a National Historic Place in 1970, and is now a historic house museum operated by the Carroll County Historical Society. The house is owned by the Ohio History Connection. There are several period rooms and exhibits about the McCook family and the Civil War.
