= John James McCook =

American family patriarch (1806–1865)

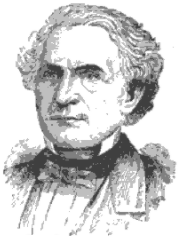
- Born: February 21, 1806; Canonsburg, Pennsylvania
- Died: October 11, 1865 (aged 59); Washington, D.C.
- Resting place: Union Cemetery
- Education: Jefferson College
- Occupation: Physician
- Spouse: Catherine Julia Sheldon (died 1865)
- Children: John James McCook

John James McCook (February 21, 1806 – October 11, 1865), was a patriarch of the Fighting McCooks, one of the most prolific families in United States Army history. Five of his sons became prominent soldiers, chaplains, or sailors, as well as eight of his nephews.

== Biography ==
McCook was born in Canonsburg, Pennsylvania on February 21, 1806, to George and Mary McCormack McCook. He attended Jefferson College's medical school. His older brother Daniel, a local attorney, moved to eastern Ohio in 1826, settling in Carrollton. Not long afterward, John McCook also moved to the Buckeye State and established a practice in New Lisbon and later in Steubenville. He was married to Catherine Julia Sheldon, a native of Hartford, Connecticut. He was superintendent for several years of the Sunday School of the First Church of Steubenville.

He served as a volunteer surgeon in the Union Army during the Civil War. He died just after its close at the headquarters of his son, General Anson G. McCook, in Washington, D.C., during a visit. McCook was buried at Union Cemetery in Steubenville beside his wife, who had preceded him in death by just seven months.
