= Daniel McCook Jr. =

American lawyer

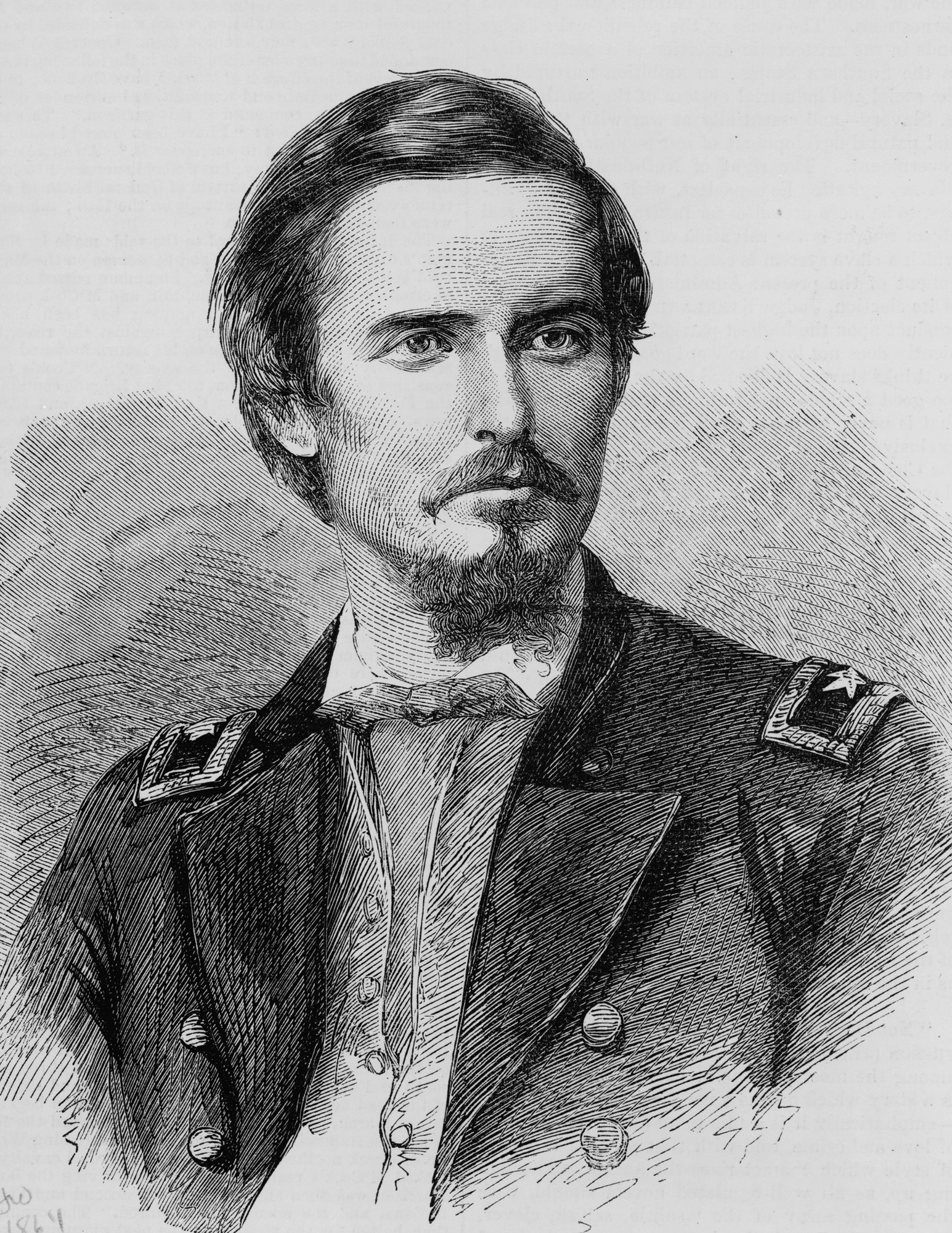
- Brig. Gen. Daniel McCook Jr
- Born: July 22, 1834; Carrollton, Ohio, U.S.
- Died: July 21, 1864 (aged 29); Steubenville, Ohio, U.S.
- Burial place: Spring Grove Cemetery, Cincinnati, Ohio
- Military career
- Allegiance: United States of America; Union
- Branch: United States Army; Union Army
- Service years: 1861 - 1864
- Rank: Brigadier General
- Commands: 52nd Ohio Infantry
- Conflicts: American Civil War: Battle of Kennesaw Mountain

Daniel McCook Jr. (July 22, 1834 – July 21, 1864), one of the famed Fighting McCooks, was a brigade commander in the Union Army who was mortally wounded in the Battle of Kennesaw Mountain, Georgia, during the American Civil War.

== Early life ==
McCook was born in Carrollton, Ohio, son of Daniel and Martha Latimer McCook. He graduated from the University of Alabama at Florence in 1858, then returned home to study law in Steubenville, Ohio. He passed his bar exam and moved to Leavenworth, Kansas, where he formed a partnership with William T. Sherman, Hugh Boyle Ewing, and Thomas Ewing Jr. The men closed their law office when the Civil War began, and all four would serve as generals in the Union Army. Married December, 1860 to Julia Tibbs of Platte County, Missouri.

== Civil War ==
McCook was captain of a local company of militia, which became part of the 1st Kansas Infantry. When the 1st Kansas marched into Missouri and the Battle of Wilson's Creek, McCook was taken ill with pneumonia and missed the battle where the 1st Kansas suffered over 50% casualties and saw the death of Brig. Gen. Nathaniel Lyon. Subsequently, McCook was named as chief of staff of the 1st Division of the Army of the Ohio in the Battle of Shiloh. He became colonel of the 52nd Ohio Infantry on July 15, 1862, and commanded a brigade under his old law partner Sherman in the Army of the Cumberland.

He was selected by Sherman to lead the assault on Kennesaw Mountain on June 27, 1864, and took his brigade directly up to the Confederate works. Just before the attack, he calmly recited to his men the stanza from Thomas Macaulay's poem of "Horatius" beginning "Then how may man die better than facing fearful odds?" He had reached the top of the enemy's works, and was encouraging his men to follow him, when he was mortally wounded by a rifle shot to his right lung. For the courage that he displayed in this assault, he was promoted to the full rank of brigadier general, to date from July 16, 1864. He was appointed a brevet major general effective on the day he died, but the appointment was not confirmed by the Senate.

He is buried in Spring Grove Cemetery in Cincinnati, Ohio.

== See also ==
- List of American Civil War generals (Union)
