= Fighting McCooks =

American Civil War Union Army officers

The Fighting McCooks were members of a family of Ohioans who reached prominence as officers in the Union Army during the American Civil War. Two brothers, Daniel and John McCook, and thirteen of their sons were involved in the army, making the family one of the most prolific in American military history. Six of the McCooks reached the rank of brigadier general or higher. Several family members were killed in action or died from their wounds. Following the war, several others reached high political offices, including governorships and diplomatic posts.

== The family ==
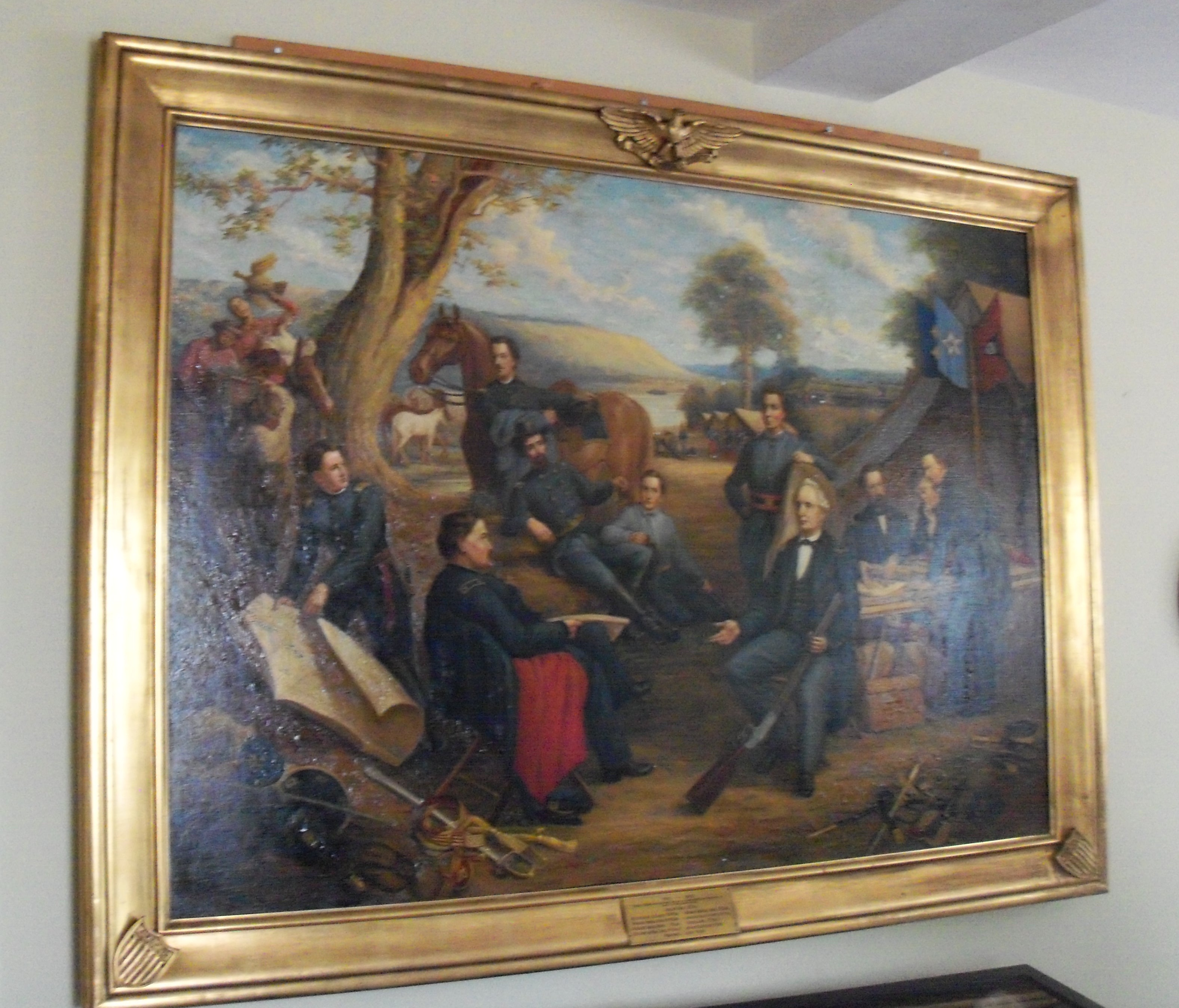
Painting of 'Tribe of Dan' at Daniel McCook House

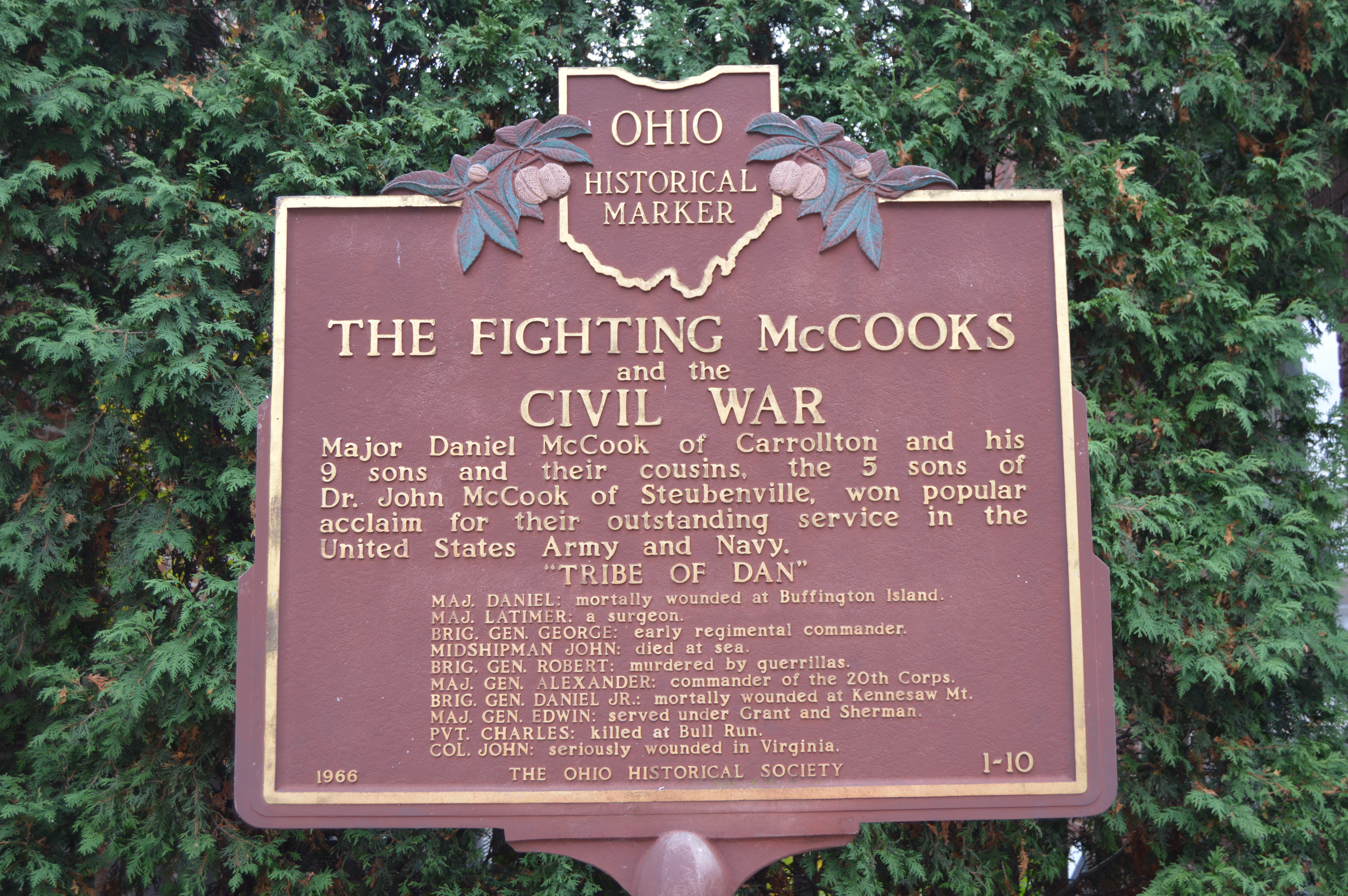
Historical marker in front of Daniel's house in Carrollton

Daniel McCook, a Canonsburg, Pennsylvania, attorney, had moved to eastern Ohio in 1826, settling in Carrollton. His younger brother, John, also soon moved to the Buckeye State. Their clans would become affectionately known as the "Tribe of Dan" and the "Tribe of John." Yet another brother, Dr. George McCook (1795-1873), and his son Dr. George Latimer McCook (1824-1874) served as unpaid surgeons during the Civil War, the latter serving under George B. McClellan during the Peninsula Campaign. Their father, another George McCook (1752-1822), had emigrated from Armoy, Ulster to Pennsylvania and had fought in the Whiskey Rebellion.

"Tribe of Dan"

- Daniel McCook (1798–1863), major, killed in action at the Battle of Buffington Island during Morgan's Raid
  - Dr. Latimer A. McCook (1820–1869), major, 31st Illinois Infantry, wounded at Vicksburg and again during Sherman's March to the Sea; died of complications from his wounds and exposure following the war
  - George Wythe McCook (1821–1877), colonel, 157th Ohio Infantry; Ohio Attorney General and candidate for Governor of Ohio
  - Robert Latimer McCook (1827–1862), brigadier general, killed by one of John Hunt Morgan's cavalrymen near Salem, Alabama, as he lay in an ambulance after a previous injury.
  - Alexander McDowell McCook (1831–1903), major general; commanded XX Corps
  - Daniel McCook, Jr. (1834–1864), brigadier general, killed in action at Kennesaw Mountain
  - Edwin Stanton McCook (1837–1873), colonel and Governor of the Dakota Territory; assassinated in office
  - Charles Morris McCook, (1843–1861), private, 2nd Ohio Infantry, killed in action at the First Battle of Bull Run; died in his father's arms. He is buried in Spring Grove Cemetery, Cincinnati, Ohio.
  - John James McCook (lawyer) (1845–1911), captain; prominent postbellum New York attorney and railroad executive
  - John James McCook (1823–1842), died near Rio de Janeiro, Brazil, while serving as a midshipman in the United States Navy

"Tribe of John"

- Dr. John James McCook (1806–1865), volunteer surgeon during the Civil War
  - Edward Moody McCook (1833–1909), brigadier general and Governor of the Colorado Territory
  - Anson George McCook (1835–1917), colonel and postbellum politician
  - Henry Christopher McCook (1837–1911), first lieutenant, Presbyterian chaplain; tended to the wounded and often joined in the fighting
  - Roderick McCook (1839–1886), commander, first naval officer to capture a Confederate regiment
  - John James McCook (professor) (1843-1927), lieutenant, Presbyterian Chaplain; seriously wounded in Northern Virginia and left the service

== Memorials ==
Daniel McCook House in Carrollton, Ohio, is preserved as a museum. McCook Field, a former air station near Dayton, Ohio (1917–1927), was named in honor of the Fighting McCooks. A granite memorial to Daniel McCook, Jr. is at the Kennesaw Mountain National Battlefield, and a marker to his father is located on State Route 124, near Buffington Island in the Ohio River. The industrial town of McCook, Illinois is named after John James McCook (lawyer).

A number of the McCooks, as well as wives and children, are interred in Spring Grove Cemetery in Cincinnati, Ohio, as well as Bend, Oregon and Miami, Florida.

McCook Field, the experimental station of the Aviation Section, U.S. Signal Corps and its successor the United States Army Air Service, located in Dayton, Ohio was named for the McCooks. It was operated from 1917 to 1927 before it was moved north to a larger facility at Wilbur Wright Field, which later became Wright-Patterson Air Force Base.
