= John James McCook (professor) =

John James McCook Jr.
- Born: February 4, 1843
- Died: January 9, 1927 (aged 83)
- Occupation: professor

John James McCook Jr. (February 4, 1843 – January 9, 1927) was a chaplain in the Union Army during the American Civil War, and reconstruction era professor, and theologian. He was a member of the Fighting McCooks, a family of Ohioans who contributed 15 members to the Union army.

== Biography ==
McCook was born in New Lisbon, Ohio. He graduated from Trinity College in Hartford, Connecticut, in 1863. He served in the Eastern Theater of the American Civil War as a chaplain with the rank of lieutenant in the 1st [West] Virginia Infantry, a regiment recruited almost exclusively from Ohio. He resigned from the Army in the autumn of 1862 and returned to Kenyon to resume his studies. In 1883 he became professor of modern languages at Trinity College, Hartford.

He held pastorates in Detroit, Michigan, and East Hartford, Connecticut. From 1895 to 1897 he was president of the board of directors of the Connecticut reformatory, and wrote on prison reform and related topics.

In 1870, he wrote Pat and the Council.

He died on January 9, 1927, and was interred at Cedar Hill Cemetery in Hartford, Connecticut.
