= Robert Latimer McCook =

Union Army general (1827–1862)

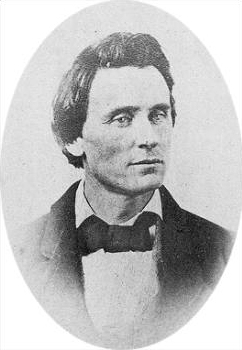
- Robert Latimer McCook
- Born: December 28, 1827; New Lisbon, Ohio, U.S.
- Died: August 6, 1862 (aged 34); Huntsville, Alabama, U.S.
- Burial place: Spring Grove Cemetery, Cincinnati, Ohio
- Military career
- Allegiance: United States of America; Union
- Branch: United States Army; Union Army
- Service years: 1861 - 1862
- Rank: Brigadier General
- Commands: 9th Ohio Infantry
- Conflicts: American Civil War

Robert Latimer McCook (December 28, 1827 – August 6, 1862) was a general in the Union Army during the American Civil War who was killed by Confederate partisans in Alabama.

== Birth and early years ==
McCook was born in New Lisbon, Ohio, one of the famed Fighting McCooks. He studied law in the Steubenville office of Stanton and McCook opening an office there by age 21. He then moved to Cincinnati, where he developed a large legal practice and socialized in local Democratic political circles. Originally a supporter of President James Buchanan, as war became inevitable, he distanced himself from the president's policies.

== Civil War ==
With the outbreak of the Civil War, McCook organized the 9th Ohio Infantry, a regiment primarily composed of recent German immigrants, in early 1861 and was appointed as its first colonel. After drilling his men at Camp Dennison, they took to the field in mid-June. McCook commanded a brigade in the West Virginia campaign under George B. McClellan, fighting in a number of battles, including Rich Mountain and Carnifex Ferry.

McCook's brigade was then transferred in the late autumn to the Army of the Ohio, and took an active part in the Battle of Mill Springs in Kentucky in January 1862. There, McCook was severely wounded while leading a daring bayonet charge on the Confederate lines. His men carried the position and routed their enemy.

McCook was promoted as a brigadier general of volunteers on March 21, 1862, while still away from the army recovering from his injury. He rejoined his command before his wound had fully healed, and found that he could no longer travel long distances on horseback. He was shot in a skirmish with the 4th Alabama Cavalry near Huntsville, Alabama. Northern versions claimed he was shot by Confederate guerrillas while lying helpless in an ambulance, but a Southern version disputes this. In agony from a mortal wound in the intestines, he was taken to a nearby house, where he died within 24 hours.

McCook was interred in Spring Grove Cemetery in Cincinnati. A statue of McCook stands near Cincinnati's Washington Park.

== See also ==
- List of American Civil War generals (Union)
