= Daniel McCook =

American lawyer

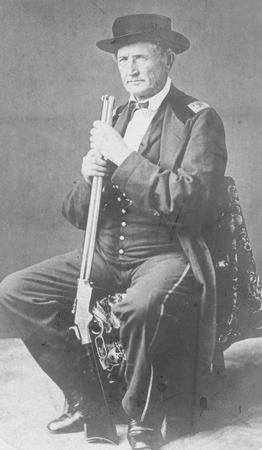
- Major Daniel McCook Sr., Union Army
- Born: June 20, 1798; Canonsburg, Pennsylvania, U.S.
- Died: July 21, 1863 (aged 65); Buffington Island, U.S.
- Relatives: John James McCook, Jr. (son); John James McCook (brother)
- Military career
- Allegiance: United States of America; Union
- Branch: (United States) Union Army
- Rank: Major
- Conflicts: American Civil War
- Other work: attorney

Daniel McCook (June 20, 1798 – July 21, 1863) was an attorney and an officer in the Union army during the American Civil War. He was one of two Ohio brothers who, along with 13 of their sons, became widely known as the “Fighting McCooks” for their contributions to the war effort.

== Biography ==
McCook was born in Canonsburg, Pennsylvania, the son of an Irish revolutionary, George McCook, who had fled to the United States about 1780. He graduated from Jefferson College. On August 28, 1817, he married Martha Latimer; they would have twelve children (nine boys and three girls). In 1826, the family moved to New Lisbon, Ohio, then to Carrollton, where McCook practiced law. He became an elder in the Presbyterian church and was a pioneer in the regional Sunday School movement. He was an elder at John McMillan's church.

With the outbreak of the Civil War, McCook, although 63 years old, volunteered his services to the Union. He was commissioned as a major and paymaster. When Confederate Brig. Gen. John H. Morgan led his troops through southern Ohio during Morgan's Raid, Major McCook joined in the advance of the Union pursuit. Early in the morning of July 19, 1863, Federal troops attacked Morgan at Buffington Island, where the Confederates were planning to cross the Ohio River back into Western Virginia. McCook was shot and mortally wounded. He died two days later, and his body was buried with full military honors in Spring Grove Cemetery in Cincinnati, Ohio.

The Daniel McCook House in Carrollton has been restored and was listed in 1970 as a National Historic Place.
