= Carrollton, Ohio =

- Village
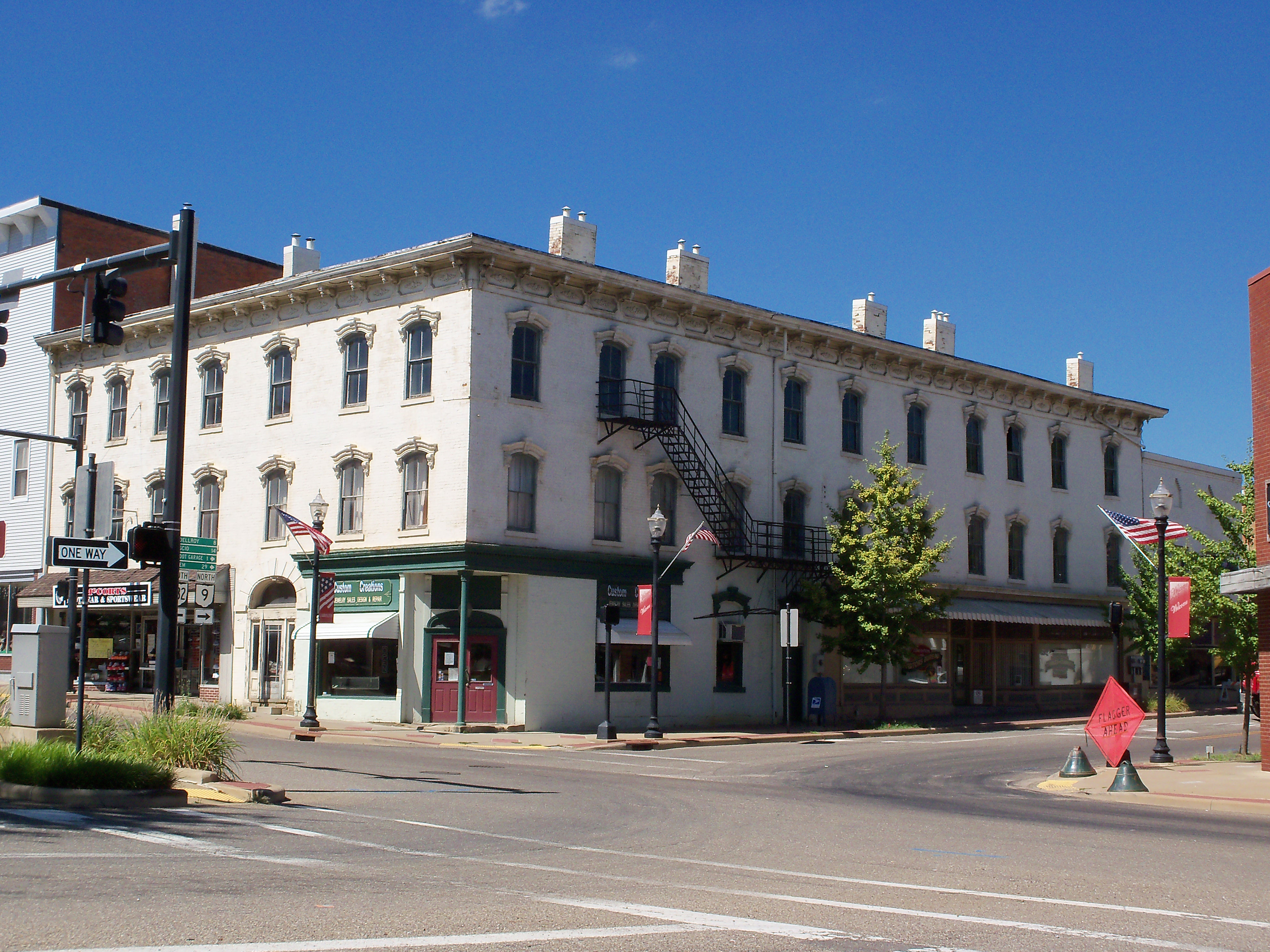
- The Van Horn Building in downtown Carrollton

- Seal
- Interactive map of Carrollton, Ohio
- Location within Ohio Location within the United States
- Coordinates: 40°34′43″N 81°05′27″W
- Country: United States
- State: Ohio
- County: Carroll
- Townships: Center, Union
- Founded: 1815

Government
  - Mayor: William Stoneman

Area
  - Total: 2.75 sq mi (7.13 km^{2})
  - Land: 2.75 sq mi (7.13 km^{2})
  - Water: 0 sq mi (0.00 km^{2})
- Elevation: 1,168 ft (356 m)

Population (2020)
  - Total: 3,087
  - Estimate (2023): 3,095
  - Density: 1,122/sq mi (433.1/km^{2})
- Time zone: UTC-5 (Eastern (EST))
  - Summer (DST): UTC-4 (EDT)
- ZIP code: 44615
- Area code: 330
- FIPS code: 39-12280
- GNIS feature ID: 2397564
- School District: Carrollton Exempted Village
- Website: villageofcarrollton.com

Carrollton is a village in Carroll County, Ohio, United States, and its county seat. The population was 3,087 at the 2020 census. It is part of the Canton–Massillon metropolitan area.

== History ==
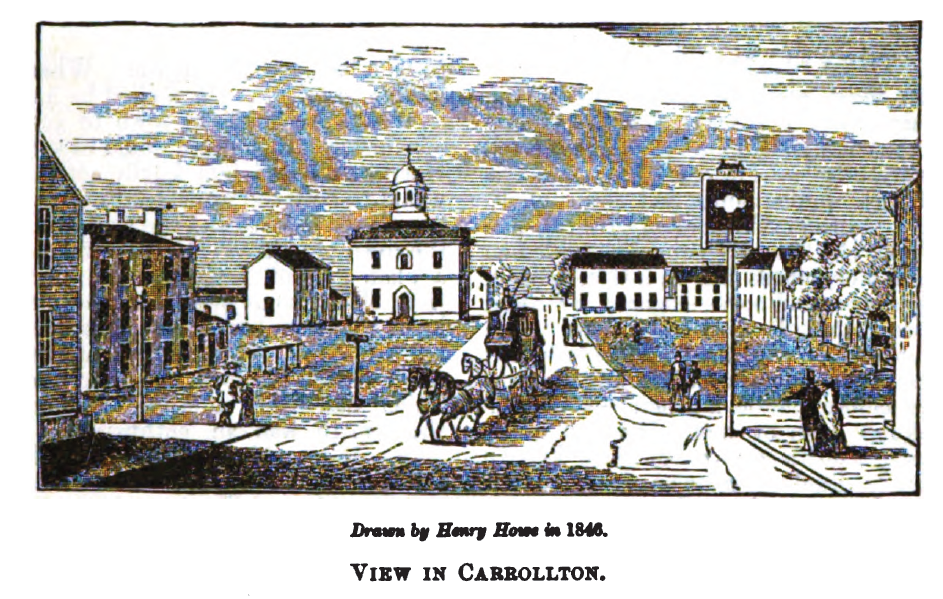
An 1846 drawing of Carrollton

The village was established as Centreville on October 4, 1815, by Peter Bohart, owing to its location at the crossroads of the Canton–Steubenville and New Lisbon–New Philadelphia routes. After the village became the county seat of the newly formed Carroll County, the name was changed on February 24, 1834. The village derives its name from Charles Carroll of Carrollton, the last surviving signer of the Declaration of Independence.

In the 19th century, many of the Fighting McCooks of Civil War fame lived in Carrollton. The Daniel McCook House is listed as a National Historic Place.

== Geography ==
According to the United States Census Bureau, the village has a total area of 2.45 square miles (6.35 km^{2}), all land.

== Demographics ==
Historical population
Census	Pop.	Note	%±
1860	721		—
1870	813		12.8%
1880	1,136		39.7%
1890	1,228		8.1%
1900	1,271		3.5%
1910	1,730		36.1%
1920	2,192		26.7%
1930	2,286		4.3%
1940	2,548		11.5%
1950	2,658		4.3%
1960	2,786		4.8%
1970	2,817		1.1%
1980	3,065		8.8%
1990	3,042		−0.8%
2000	3,190		4.9%
2010	3,241		1.6%
2020	3,087		−4.8%
2023 (est.)	3,095	▲	0.3%

=== 2020 census ===
As of the 2020 census, Carrollton had a population of 3,087. The median age was 43.6 years. 22.0% of residents were under the age of 18 and 23.0% of residents were 65 years of age or older. For every 100 females there were 84.7 males, and for every 100 females age 18 and over there were 78.4 males age 18 and over.

0.0% of residents lived in urban areas, while 100.0% lived in rural areas.

There were 1,312 households in Carrollton, of which 25.9% had children under the age of 18 living in them. Of all households, 40.5% were married-couple households, 18.2% were households with a male householder and no spouse or partner present, and 33.7% were households with a female householder and no spouse or partner present. About 37.5% of all households were made up of individuals and 19.3% had someone living alone who was 65 years of age or older.

There were 1,515 housing units, of which 13.4% were vacant. The homeowner vacancy rate was 6.0% and the rental vacancy rate was 14.3%.

Racial composition as of the 2020 census
Race	Number	Percent
White	2,918	94.5%
Black or African American	11	0.4%
American Indian and Alaska Native	12	0.4%
Asian	14	0.5%
Native Hawaiian and Other Pacific Islander	0	0.0%
Some other race	36	1.2%
Two or more races	96	3.1%
Hispanic or Latino (of any race)	64	2.1%

=== 2010 census ===
As of the census of 2010, there were 3,241 people, 1,347 households, and 829 families living in the village. The population density was 1,322.9 inhabitants per square mile (510.8/km^{2}). There were 1,502 housing units at an average density of 613.1 per square mile (236.7/km^{2}). The racial makeup of the village was 98.2% White, 0.4% African American, 0.4% Asian, 0.2% from other races, and 0.9% from two or more races. Hispanic or Latino of any race were 0.9% of the population.

There were 1,347 households, of which 29.0% had children under the age of 18 living with them, 44.5% were married couples living together, 13.0% had a female householder with no husband present, 4.0% had a male householder with no wife present, and 38.5% were non-families. 33.9% of all households comprised individuals, and 17.6% had someone who was 65 or older living alone. The average household size was 2.26, and the average family size was 2.86.

The median age in the village was 42.2 years. 22.3% of residents were under 18; 8.3% were between 18 and 24; 22.2% were from 25 to 44; 24.9% were from 45 to 64; and 22.2% were 65 or older. The gender makeup of the village was 44.2% male and 55.8% female.

=== 2000 census ===
As of the census of 2000, there were 3,190 people, 1,428 households, and 846 families living in the village. The population density was 1,340.9 inhabitants per square mile (517.7/km^{2}). There were 1,531 housing units at an average density of 643.6 per square mile (248.5/km^{2}). The racial makeup of the village was 98.59% White, 0.25% African American, 0.19% Native American, 0.06% Asian, 0.06% from other races, and 0.85% from two or more races. Hispanic or Latino of any race were 0.47% of the population.

There were 1,428 households, out of which 25.4% had children under the age of 18 living with them, 46.0% were married couples living together, 10.7% had a female householder with no husband present, and 40.7% were non-families. 36.4% of all households comprised individuals, and 20.6% had someone who was 65 or older living alone. The average household size was 2.16, and the average family size was 2.80.

The village's population was spread out, with 21.4% under 18, 8.1% from 18 to 24, 24.0% from 25 to 44, 23.4% from 45 to 64, and 23.0% who were 65 years of age or older. The median age was 42. For every 100 females, there were 82.2 males. For every 100 females age 18 and over, there were 75.1 males.

The median income for a household in the village was $25,694, and the median income for a family was $38,528. Males had a median income of $31,885 versus $16,441 for females. The per capita income for the village was $14,866. About 11.3% of families and 17.0% of the population were below the poverty line, including 27.4% of those under age 18 and 21.2% of those age 65 or over.

== Education ==
Children in Carrollton are served by the Carrollton Exempted Village School District, which includes one elementary school, one middle school, and Carrollton High School. Carrollton has a public library, a branch of the Carroll County District Library.

== Infrastructure ==
=== Transportation ===
The Carroll County–Tolson Airport is located one nautical mile (1.2 mi; 1.9 km) southeast of Carrollton's central business district.

Carrollton is at the junction of State Routes 39 and 43. State Routes 9 and 332 also pass through the village.

A branch of the Wheeling and Lake Erie Railway passes through and ends at the Carroll County Industrial Park.

== Notable people ==
- Robert Jones Atkinson, president of the Ohio Senate
- Bill Cooper, National Football League player
- William Crozier, artillerist and inventor
- Ephraim R. Eckley, U.S. representative from Ohio and Union Army brigadier general
- Harvey J. Eckley, member of the Ohio Senate
- Sam Hall, daytime soap opera screenwriter
- George Hemming, Major League Baseball player
- Joseph K. Hudson, U.S. Army brigadier general
- William Johnston, member of the Ohio House of Representatives and Northwest Territory surveyor general
- Kirk Lowdermilk, National Football League player
- Eddie and Sam Maple, brothers who were American thoroughbred horse racing jockeys
- Daniel McCook, attorney and Union Army major
- Daniel McCook Jr., Union Army brigadier general
- Edwin Stanton McCook, Union Army officer and Dakota territorial governor
- George Wythe McCook, fourth Ohio attorney general and Union Army colonel
- John James McCook, lawyer, professor, and Union Army chaplain
- Mark Okey, member of the Ohio House of Representatives
- Benjamin F. Potts, Montana territorial governor
- Isaac H. Taylor, U.S. representative from Ohio
- Thomas J. Tolan, architect
- David Yost, American football coach
