= Canton–Massillon metropolitan area =

Coordinates: 40°48′N 81°28′W

Greater Canton
- Metropolitan Statistical Area
- Canton–Massillon, OH; Metropolitan Statistical Area
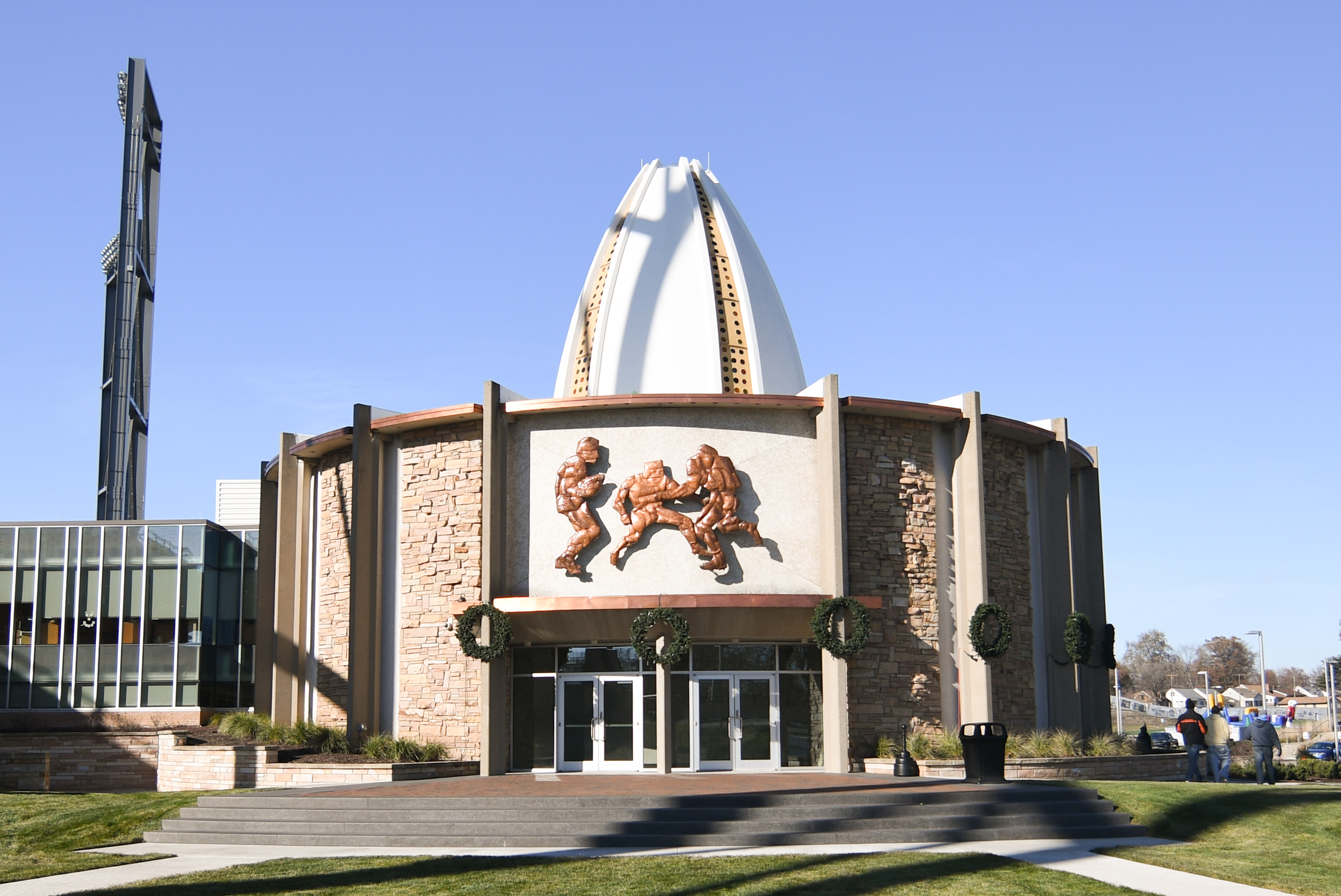
- Pro Football Hall of Fame
Map of Canton–Massillon, OH MSA
Canton–Massillon, OH MSA
City of Canton
City of Massillon
Other Counties in the Cleveland, OH CSA
- Country: United States
- State: Ohio
- Principal cities: Canton; Massillon
- Other city: Alliance

Area
  - Total: 980 sq mi (2,530 km^{2})

Population (2020)
  - MSA: 401,574 (136th)
  - CSA: 3,633,962 (17th)
- MSA/CSA = 2020

GDP
  - MSA: $22.880 billion (2022)
- Time zone: UTC−5 (EST)
  - Summer (DST): UTC−4 (EDT)
- Area codes: 330, 234

The Canton–Massillon Metropolitan Statistical Area, as defined by the United States Census Bureau is an area consisting of Caroll County and Stark County in Northeast Ohio, anchored by the cities of Canton and Massillon. As of the 2020 census, the MSA had a population of 401,574. The MSA is a component of the Cleveland–Akron–Canton, OH Combined Statistical Area, which had a population of 3,633,962 in 2020, the largest CSA in Ohio.

== Counties ==
MSA Population
Census	Pop.	Note	%±
1950	302,233		—
1960	361,202		19.5%
1970	393,789		9.0%
1980	404,421		2.7%
1990	394,106		−2.6%
2000	406,934		3.3%
2010	404,422		−0.6%
2020	401,574		−0.7%
U.S. Decennial Census

- Carroll
- Stark

== Communities ==
=== Incorporated cities with more than 30,000 inhabitants ===
- Canton (principal city)
- Massillon (principal city)

=== Townships with more than 30,000 inhabitants ===
- Jackson Township
- Perry Township
- Plain Township

=== Incorporated cities with 10,000 to 30,000 inhabitants ===
- Alliance (partial)
- North Canton

=== Townships with 10,000 to 30,000 inhabitants ===
- Canton Township
- Lake Township
- Lawrence Township
- Nimishillen Township

=== Places with 1,000 to 10,000 inhabitants ===
- Beach City
- Brewster
- Canal Fulton
- Carrollton
- East Canton
- Greentown (census-designated place)
- Hartville
- Louisville
- Malvern
- Minerva (partial)
- Navarre
- Perry Heights (census-designated place)
- Uniontown (census-designated place)
- Waynesburg

=== Places with less than 1,000 inhabitants ===
- Dellroy
- East Sparta
- Hills and Dales
- Leesville
- Limaville
- Magnolia
- Meyers Lake
- Sherrodsville
- Wilmot

=== Unincorporated places ===
- Augusta
- Avondale
- Cairo
- East Greenville
- Harlem Springs
- Marchand
- Maximo
- Mechanicstown
- Middlebranch
- New Franklin
- North Industry
- North Lawrence
- Paris
- Richville
- Robertsville
- Waco

== Townships ==
=== Carroll County ===
- Augusta
- Brown
- Center
- East
- Fox
- Harrison
- Lee
- Loudon
- Monroe
- Orange
- Perry
- Rose
- Union
- Washington

=== Stark County ===
- Bethlehem
- Canton
- Jackson
- Lake
- Lawrence
- Lexington
- Marlboro
- Nimishillen
- Osnaburg
- Paris
- Perry
- Pike
- Plain
- Sandy
- Sugar Creek
- Tuscarawas
- Washington

== Demographics ==
As of the census of 2000, there were 406,934 people, 159,442 households, and 110,957 families residing within the MSA. The racial makeup of the MSA was 90.84% White, 6.73% African American, 0.25% Native American, 0.51% Asian, 0.02% Pacific Islander, 0.28% from other races, and 1.38% from two or more races. Hispanic or Latino of any race were 0.90% of the population.

The median income for a household in the MSA was $37,667, and the median income for a family was $44,431. Males had a median income of $34,338 versus $22,580 for females. The per capita income for the MSA was $18,559.

County	Seat	2025 estimate	2020 Census	Change	Area	Density
Stark	Canton	373,771	374,853	−0.29%	581 sq mi (1,500 km^{2})	643/sq mi (248/km^{2})
Carroll	Carrollton	26,475	26,721	−0.92%	399 sq mi (1,030 km^{2})	66/sq mi (26/km^{2})
Total		400,246	401,574	−0.33%	980 sq mi (2,500 km^{2})	408/sq mi (158/km^{2})

== See also ==
- Ohio census statistical areas
