= Wattsville, Ohio =

Unincorporated community in Ohio, U.S.

Coordinates: 40°34′24″N 80°55′58″W

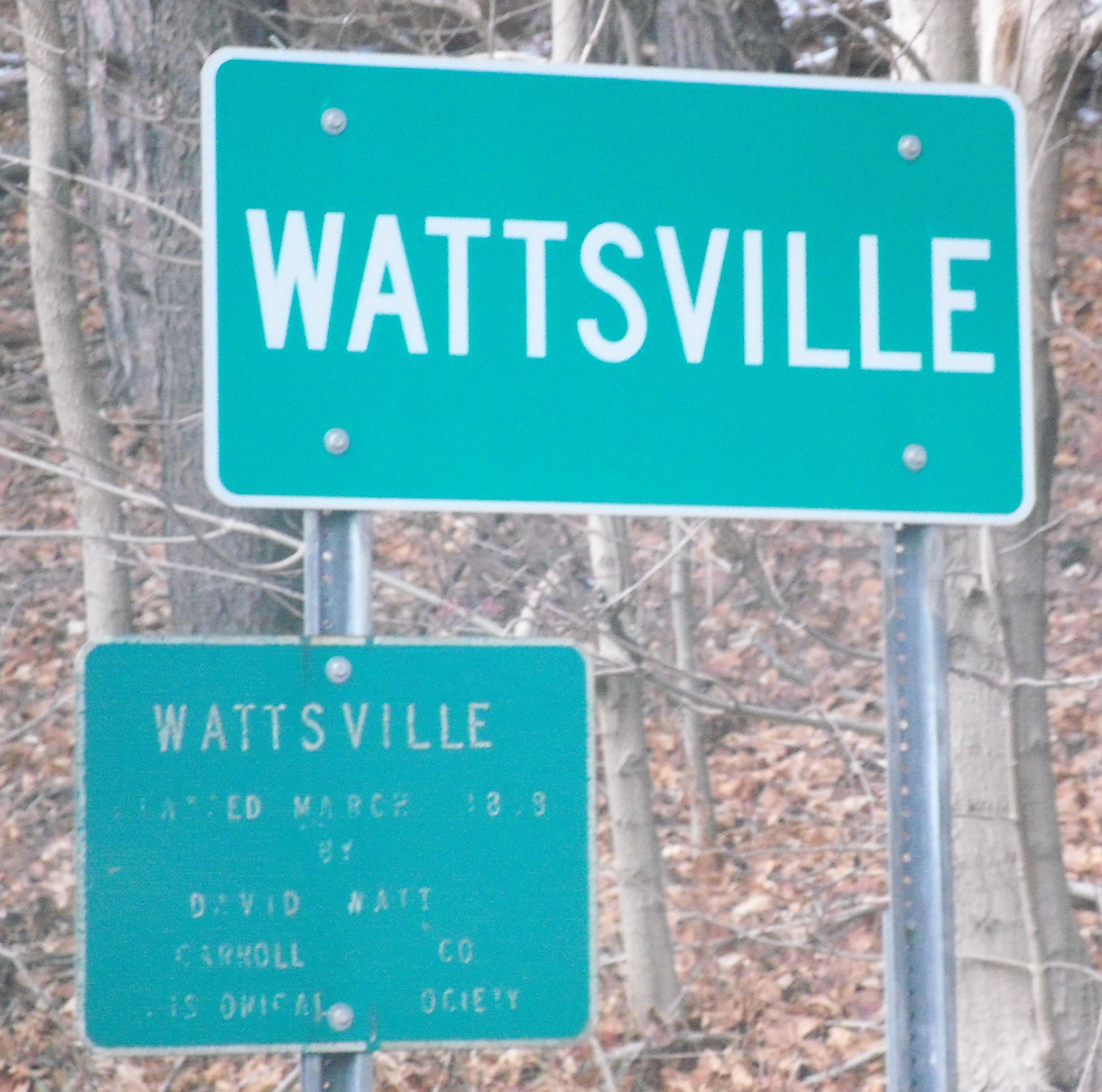
Signs on Route 524

Wattsville is an unincorporated community in Fox Township, Carroll County, Ohio, United States. The community is part of the Canton–Massillon Metropolitan Statistical Area. It is serviced by the Carrollton, Ohio, post office, ZIP code 44615. It is located on the Upper North Fork of Yellow Creek, State Route 524, and the Ohi-Rail Corporation (OHIC) railroad.

== History ==
Wattsville was platted March 28, 1838, by David Watt in the southwest quarter of section 36 of township 13 of range 4.

== Education ==
Students attend the Carrollton Exempted Village School District.
