= Ohio State Route 524 =

State highway in eastern Ohio, US

State Route 524

Route information
- Maintained by ODOT
- Length: 8.10 mi (13.04 km)
- Existed: 1947–present

Major junctions
- South end: SR 164 in Bergholz
- North end: SR 39 / CR 12 in Mechanicstown

Location
- Country: United States
- State: Ohio
- Counties: Jefferson, Carroll

Highway system
- Ohio State Highway System; Interstate; US; State; Scenic
← SR 523	→ SR 526

State Route 524 (SR 524) is a state highway in eastern Ohio. The 8.10-mile-long (13.04 km) north–south route runs from the village of Bergholz at SR 164 to the unincorporated community of Mechanicstown at SR 39.

== Route description ==
SR 524 begins at an intersection with SR 164 in the northernmost section of Bergholz, a village in northwestern Jefferson County. For most of the route's length, it parallels the Upper North Fork of Yellow Creek, an Ohi-Rail Corporation rail line, and a 345-kilovolt power line. From the southern terminus, the route heads north-northwest through a valley formed by the creek. Through Jefferson County, it passes through Bergholz and Springfield Township. After entering Carroll County, it briefly clips Lee Township and enters Fox Township. While still closely following the creek and railroad, the route passes through the community of Wattsville. As the route nears Mechanicstown, SR 524 curves to the north and separates from the creek and railroad. At Mechanicstown, the route ends at SR 39 at a stop-controlled intersection; Apollo Road (Carroll County Route 12) continues north through the intersection.

== History ==
SR 524 was first designated in 1947 on the same Bergholz–Mechanicstown route it follows today. At the time, the route was wholly a gravel road. By 1958, the route became fully asphalt-paved.

== Major intersections ==
County	Location	mi	km	Destinations	Notes
Jefferson	Bergholz	0.00	0.00	SR 164	
Carroll	Fox Township	8.10	13.04	SR 39 (Salineville Road) / CR 12 (Apollo Road) – Carrollton, Salineville	
1.000 mi = 1.609 km; 1.000 km = 0.621 mi
