= Benjamin F. Potts =

American politician

Benjamin Franklin Potts
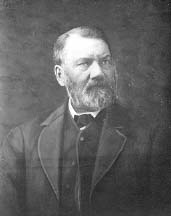

Governor of the Montana Territory
- In office July 13, 1870 – January 14, 1883
- President: Ulysses S. Grant; James A. Garfield; Chester A. Arthur
- Preceded by: Wiley Scribner (acting)
- Succeeded by: John Schuyler Crosby

Ohio State Senator
- In office 1868–1870
- Preceded by: Henry S. Martin
- Succeeded by: A.C. Wales
- Constituency: 21st district

Personal details
- Born: January 29, 1836 Fox Township, Carroll County, Ohio
- Died: June 17, 1887 (aged 51) Helena, Montana
- Resting place: Forestvale Cemetery, Helena, Montana
- Party: Democratic

Military service
- Allegiance: United States; Union
- Branch/service: United States Army; Union Army
- Years of service: 1861–1866
- Rank: Brigadier General; Brevet Major General
- Unit: Army of the Tennessee
- Commands: 32nd Ohio Infantry
- Battles/wars: American Civil War: Battle of Cheat Mountain; Battle of Greenbrier River; Battle of McDowell; Battle of Cross Keys; Battle of Port Republic; Battle of Jackson; Siege of Vicksburg; Atlanta campaign; Carolinas Campaign

Benjamin Franklin Potts (January 29, 1836 – June 17, 1887) was an American lawyer, politician, and soldier from the state of Ohio who served as a general in the Union Army during the American Civil War, as well as a reconstruction era governor of the Montana Territory from 1870 to 1883. He commanded a brigade of infantry in the Western Theater in some of the war's most important campaigns and repeatedly received commendations for gallantry and tactical judgement in combat.

== Early life and career ==
Benjamin Potts was born on a farm in Fox Township, Carroll County, Ohio, to James and Jane (Mapel) Potts. He attended the common schools. When he was seventeen, he began working as a clerk in a dry goods store in nearby Wattsville. He attended Westminster College in 1854–55, until he ran out of funding and returned to Ohio. He taught school and read law starting in September 1857 under Ephraim R. Eckley, later a U.S. Congressman. An active supporter of President James Buchanan, Potts was interested in local and national politics and joined the Democratic Party.

In May 1859, he passed his bar exam in Canton, Ohio, and established a successful practice in Carrollton. He was a member of the Ohio delegation to the 1860 Democratic National Convention in Charleston, South Carolina, and supported the candidacy of Stephen A. Douglas.

== Civil War ==
With the outbreak of the Civil War, Potts was elected as a captain of the 32nd Ohio Infantry and mustered into the service on August 29, 1861. He served with the regiment in western Virginia and was present at Cheat Mountain and Greenbrier River. He was engaged in scouting with his company during a portion of the winter of 1861–1862; and in the spring of 1862 he accompanied the regiment in the advance under Maj. Gen. Robert H. Milroy. Subsequently, he was engaged in the Battle of McDowell. He accompanied General John C. Frémont in his campaign up the Shenandoah Valley in pursuit of Stonewall Jackson, and was present at Cross Keys and Port Republic.

In July 1862, he was temporarily detached from his infantry company and assigned command of an artillery battery in Winchester, Virginia. During the Maryland Campaign, he and his men fell back to the presumed safety of Harpers Ferry, where they were part of the largest surrender of the U.S. Army until World War II, following the Battle of Harpers Ferry. Potts was paroled and sent to Camp Douglas until exchanged.

In December 1862, Potts was promoted to lieutenant colonel and commander of the demoralized and badly depleted 32nd Ohio. He reorganized the regiment, added substantially to its ranks, and refitted it for field duty. On Christmas Day, he was elevated to the colonelcy and then led the regiment in numerous campaigns of the Army of the Tennessee in the Western Theater, including the Siege of Vicksburg and the Atlanta campaign. At Port Gibson he was complimented for gallantry by brigade commander Brig. Gen. John D. Stevenson; and at Raymond, Jackson, and Champion Hill, he received the thanks of Maj. Gen. John A. Logan. During the fight at Champion Hill, Colonel Potts charged with his regiment and captured an eight-gun Confederate battery and half of an Alabama infantry brigade that was guarding it.

In August Potts was assigned to the command of the 3rd Brigade, 3rd Division, XVII Corps, and he accompanied an expedition to Monroe, Louisiana. In November, Maj. Gen. James B. McPherson placed Potts in command of the 2nd Brigade. During Maj. Gen. William T. Sherman's Meridian expedition, Potts led the advance of the XVII Corps across Baker's Creek, routed the Rebels under William Wirt Adams, and drove them into Jackson. Later, Potts commanded the forces that destroyed the railroad from Meridian.

In 1864, Potts was assigned command of the 1st Brigade, 4th Division of the XVII Corps, and was distinguished during the Atlanta campaign, especially in the Battle of Atlanta. Division commander Giles A. Smith wrote, "Colonel Potts did more, on the 22d of July, 1864, to save the good name of the Army of the Tennessee, than any other one man." That fall, he participated in the successful operations against Savannah, Georgia.

In January 1865, Potts was promoted to brigadier general of volunteers. He led his brigade during the Carolinas Campaign and in the Grand Review of the Armies in Washington, D.C. In May following the end of hostilities. Potts received the brevet rank of major general in the omnibus promotions at the end of the Civil War.

== Reconstruction era career ==
Potts mustered out of the army in January 1866 and returned to Carroll County, Ohio, where he resumed his legal and political careers. He changed political parties and joined the Republicans. A moderate, he was elected to the Ohio State Senate in 1867. Three years later, he accepted an appointment from a fellow Ohio politician and former general, President Ulysses S. Grant, as the governor of the Montana Territory, but only after first refusing it because the adoption of the Fifteenth Amendment to the United States Constitution in the Ohio Legislature depended upon his vote, which would be lost if he vacated his seat. Potts served until 1883. As governor, he was heavily involved in Indian affairs, as well as working to get several new frontier towns chartered, including Missoula. The bipartisan political stability Potts brought to Montana played an important role in the gradual lessening of vigilante activities and lawlessness in the territory. He later served in the territorial legislature.

Benjamin F. Potts died in 1887 in Helena, Montana, where he was buried initially in the Benton Avenue Cemetery. His remains were later moved to Forestvale Cemetery.

== See also ==
- List of American Civil War generals (Union)
- List of Ohio's American Civil War generals
- Ohio in the American Civil War

== Notes ==
Ohio Senate
Preceded by Henry S. Martin	Senator from 21st District (Carroll and Stark Counties); 1868–1870	Succeeded by A. C. Wales
