= New Franklin =

New Franklin may refer to:

- New Franklin, Missouri
- New Franklin, Ohio:
  - New Franklin, Stark County, Ohio
  - New Franklin, Summit County, Ohio
- New Franklin, Pennsylvania
