= Paris, Stark County, Ohio =

Unincorporated community in Ohio, U.S.

Coordinates: 40°47′52″N 81°10′0″W

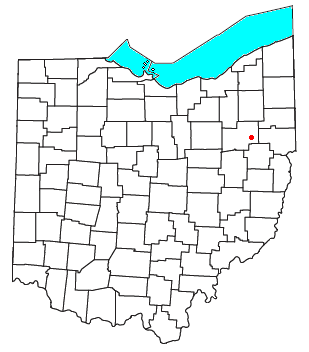
Location of Paris, Ohio

Paris is an unincorporated community in northwestern Paris Township, Stark County, Ohio. It has a post office with the ZIP code 44669. It lies along State Route 172 between East Canton and Lisbon. The community is part of the Canton–Massillon Metropolitan Statistical Area.

== History ==
Paris was laid out in 1813 on a stagecoach turnpike. A share of the early settlers being natives of France most likely caused the name Paris to be selected. A post office called Paris has been in operation since 1822.
