= Robertsville, Ohio =

- CDP
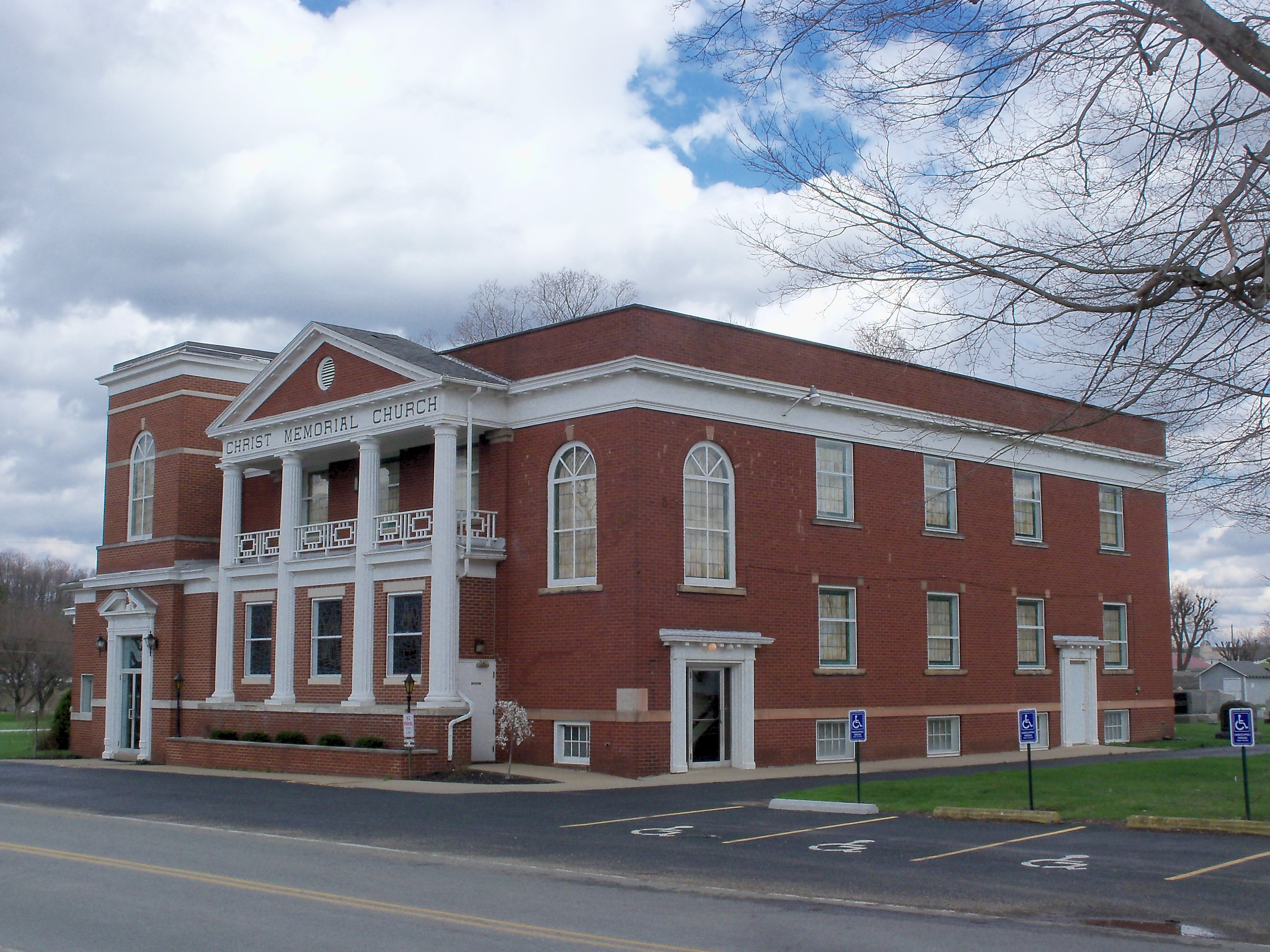
- Church next to graveyard in Robertsville

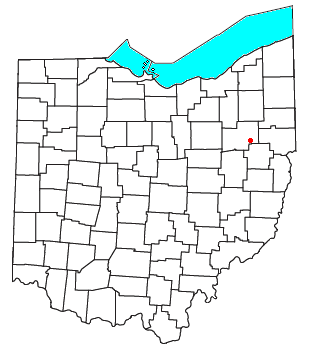
- Location of Robertsville, Ohio
- Coordinates: 40°45′43″N 81°11′38″W
- Country: United States
- State: Ohio
- County: Stark
- Township: Paris
- Elevation: 1,083 ft (330 m)

Population (2020)
  - Total: 293
- Time zone: UTC-5 (Eastern (EST))
  - Summer (DST): UTC-4 (EDT)
- ZIP code: 44670
- GNIS feature ID: 2628961

Robertsville is an unincorporated community and census-designated place in western Paris Township, Stark County, Ohio, United States. It has a post office with the ZIP code 44670. It lies along U.S. Route 30 between East Canton and Minerva and is in the Minerva Local School District. The community is part of the Canton–Massillon Metropolitan Statistical Area. The population was 293 at the 2020 census.

== History ==
A variant name was Robardsville. Robertsville was laid out in 1842 by Joseph Robard, and named for him. A post office called Robertsville has been in operation since 1862.
