= Center Township, Carroll County, Ohio =

Township in Ohio, US

- Township
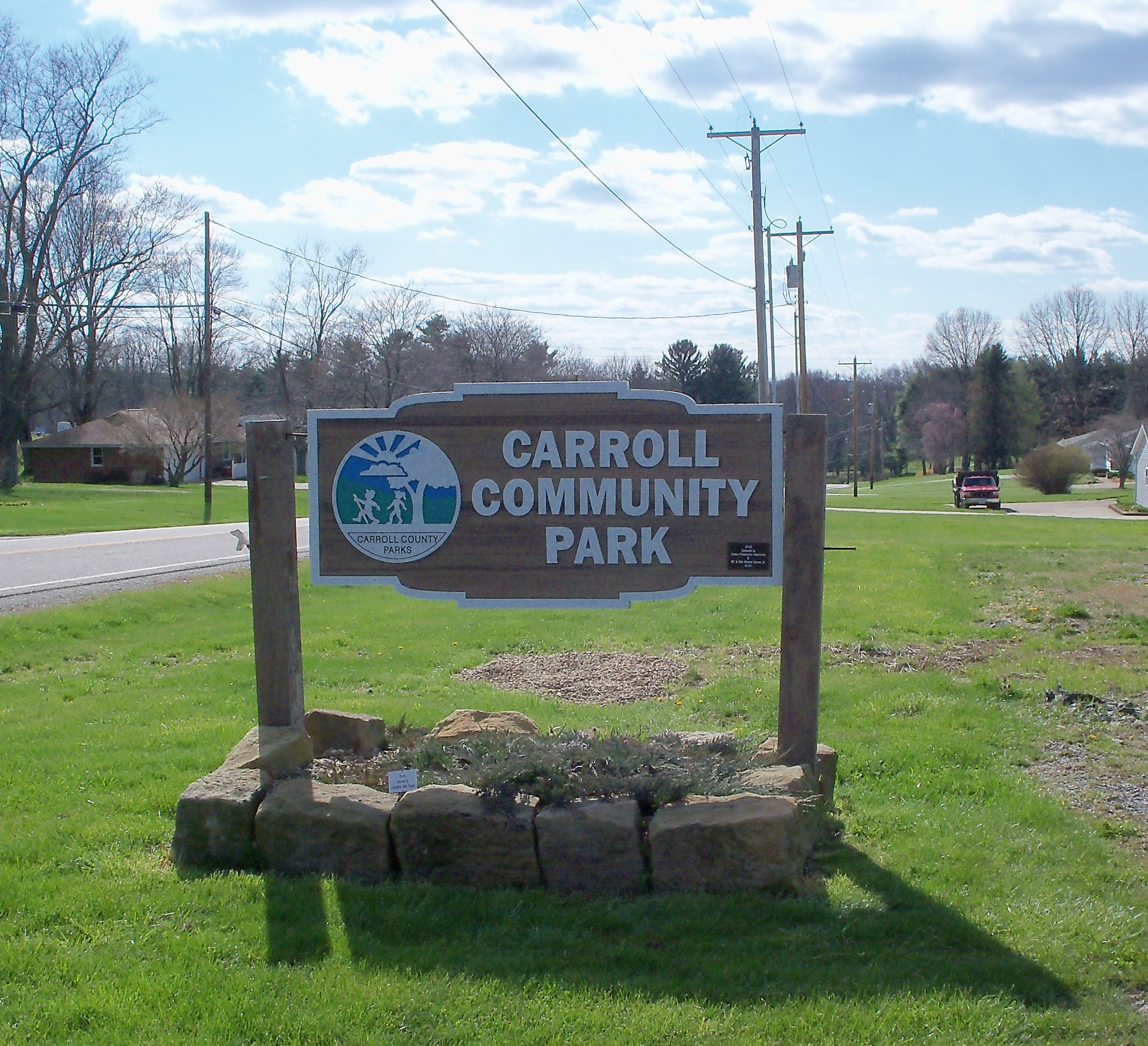
- Community Park along State Route 39 in Center Township

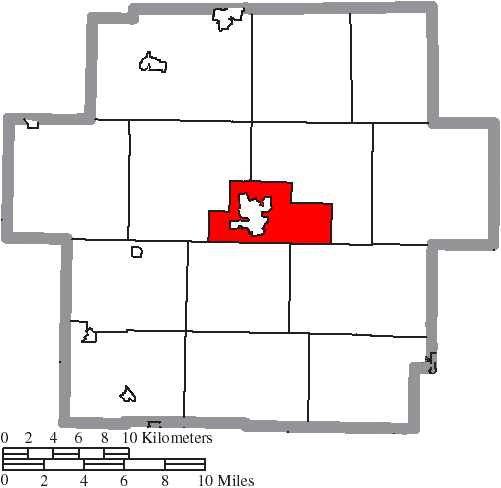
- Location of Center Township in Carroll County
- Coordinates: 40°34′42″N 81°4′51″W
- Country: United States
- State: Ohio
- County: Carroll

Area
  - Total: 14.8 sq mi (38.4 km^{2})
  - Land: 14.8 sq mi (38.4 km^{2})
  - Water: 0 sq mi (0.0 km^{2})
- Elevation: 1,145 ft (349 m)

Population (2010)
  - Total: 4,428
  - Density: 299/sq mi (115.3/km^{2})
- Time zone: UTC-5 (Eastern (EST))
  - Summer (DST): UTC-4 (EDT)
- FIPS code: 39-12896
- GNIS feature ID: 1085826

Center Township is one of the fourteen townships of Carroll County, Ohio, United States. As of the 2020 census there were 4,428 people living in the township, 1,341 of whom lived in the unincorporated portions of the township.

== Geography ==
Located at the center of the county, it borders the following townships:

- Washington Township - northeast
- Lee Township - southeast
- Union Township - southwest
- Harrison Township - northwest

The village of Carrollton, the county seat of Carroll County, is located in central Center Township.

Several state highways pass through the township, converging in Carrollton. Ohio State Route 9 leads northeast 28 miles (45 km) to Salem and south 30 miles (48 km) to Cadiz. Ohio State Route 39 crosses OH 9 in Carrollton and leads east 32 miles (51 km) to East Liverpool and west 25 miles (40 km) to New Philadelphia. Ohio State Route 43 leads northwest 26 miles (42 km) to Canton and southeast 34 miles (55 km) to Steubenville, and Ohio State Route 332 leads south 14 miles (23 km) to Scio.

== Name and history ==
It is one of nine Center Townships statewide.

Center Township was not organized as a separate civil township until several years after the organization of Carroll County in March 1836, when the county commissioners had presented them a petition asking for the erection of a separate township to be called "Centre", being composed of parts of Harrison and Washington townships.

== Government ==
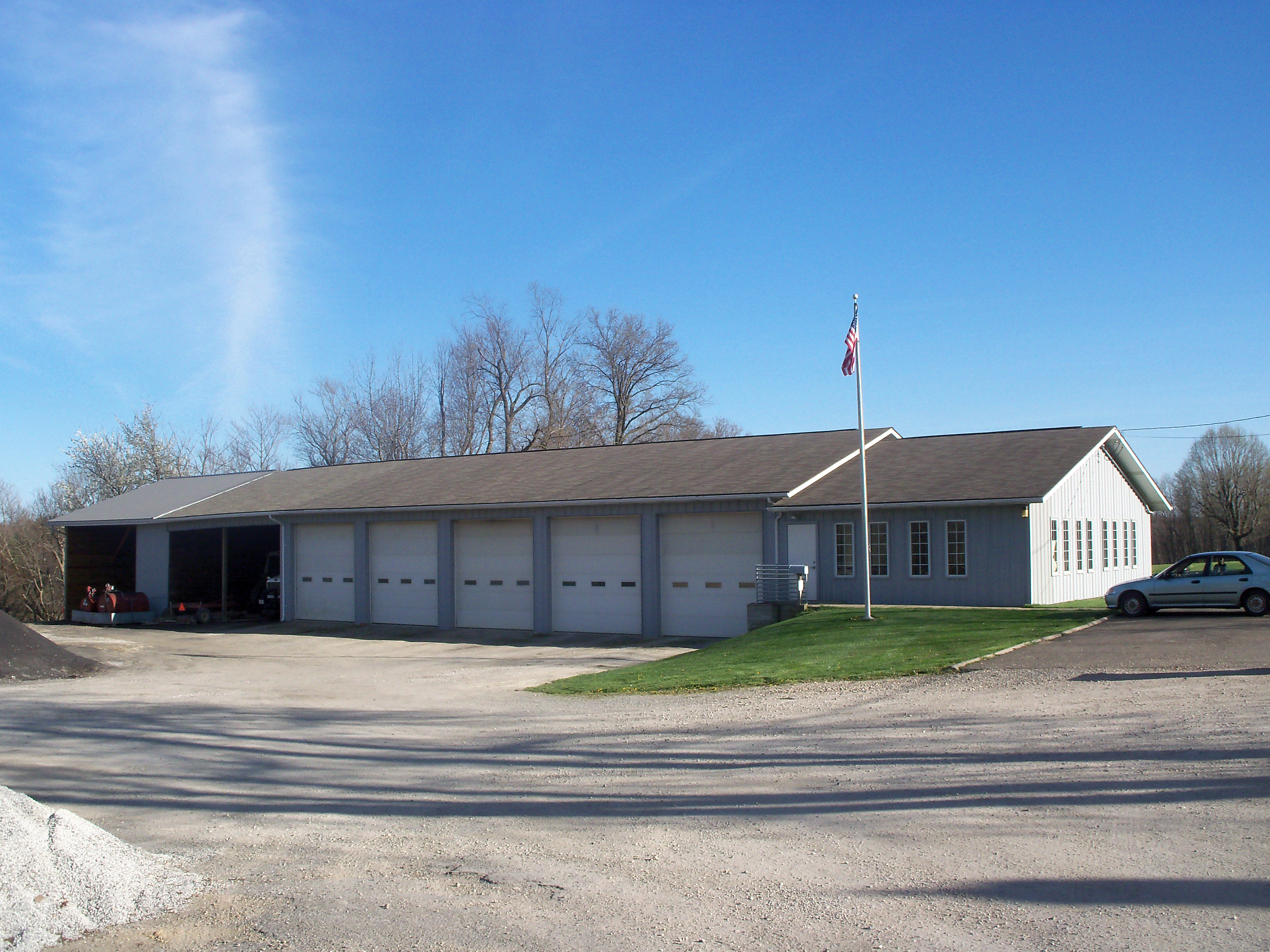
Town hall

Historical population
Census	Pop.	Note	%±
1840	1,139		—
1850	1,199		5.3%
1860	1,204		0.4%
1870	1,227		1.9%
1880	1,590		29.6%
1890	1,605		0.9%
1900	1,704		6.2%
1910	2,149		26.1%
1920	2,653		23.5%
1930	2,884		8.7%
1940	3,245		12.5%
1950	3,450		6.3%
1960	3,893		12.8%
1970	4,311		10.7%
1980	4,526		5.0%
1990	4,434		−2.0%
2000	4,412		−0.5%
2010	4,664		5.7%
2020	4,428		−5.1%

The township is governed by a three-member board of trustees, who are elected in November of odd-numbered years to a four-year term beginning on the following January 1. Two are elected in the year after the presidential election and one is elected in the year before it. There is also an elected township fiscal officer, who serves a four-year term beginning on April 1 of the year after the election, which is held in November of the year before the presidential election. Vacancies in the fiscal officership or on the board of trustees are filled by the remaining trustees.

== Education ==
Students attend the Carrollton Exempted Village School District.
