= West Township, Columbiana County, Ohio =

Township in Ohio, US

- Township
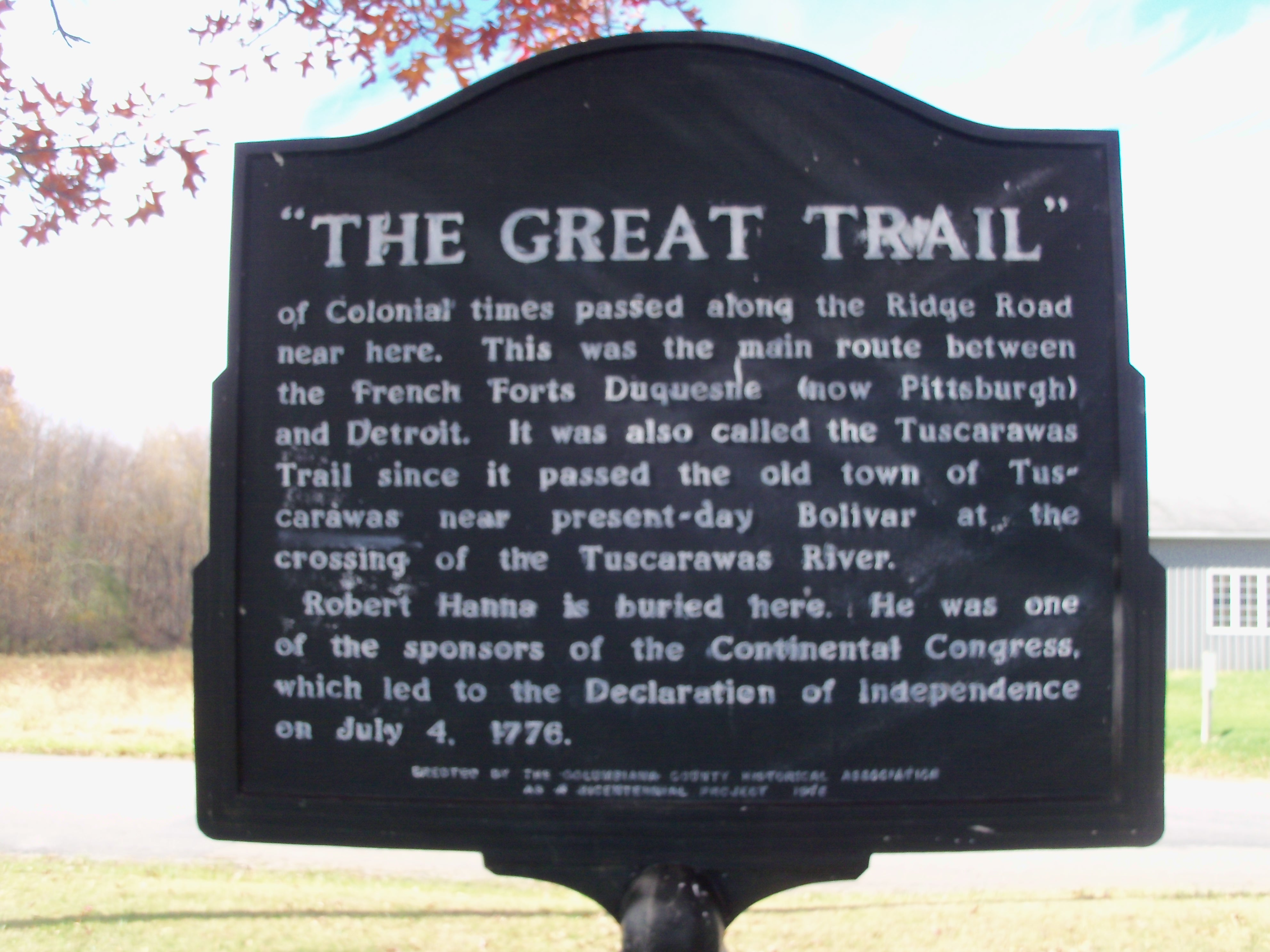
- The Great Trail passed through this area

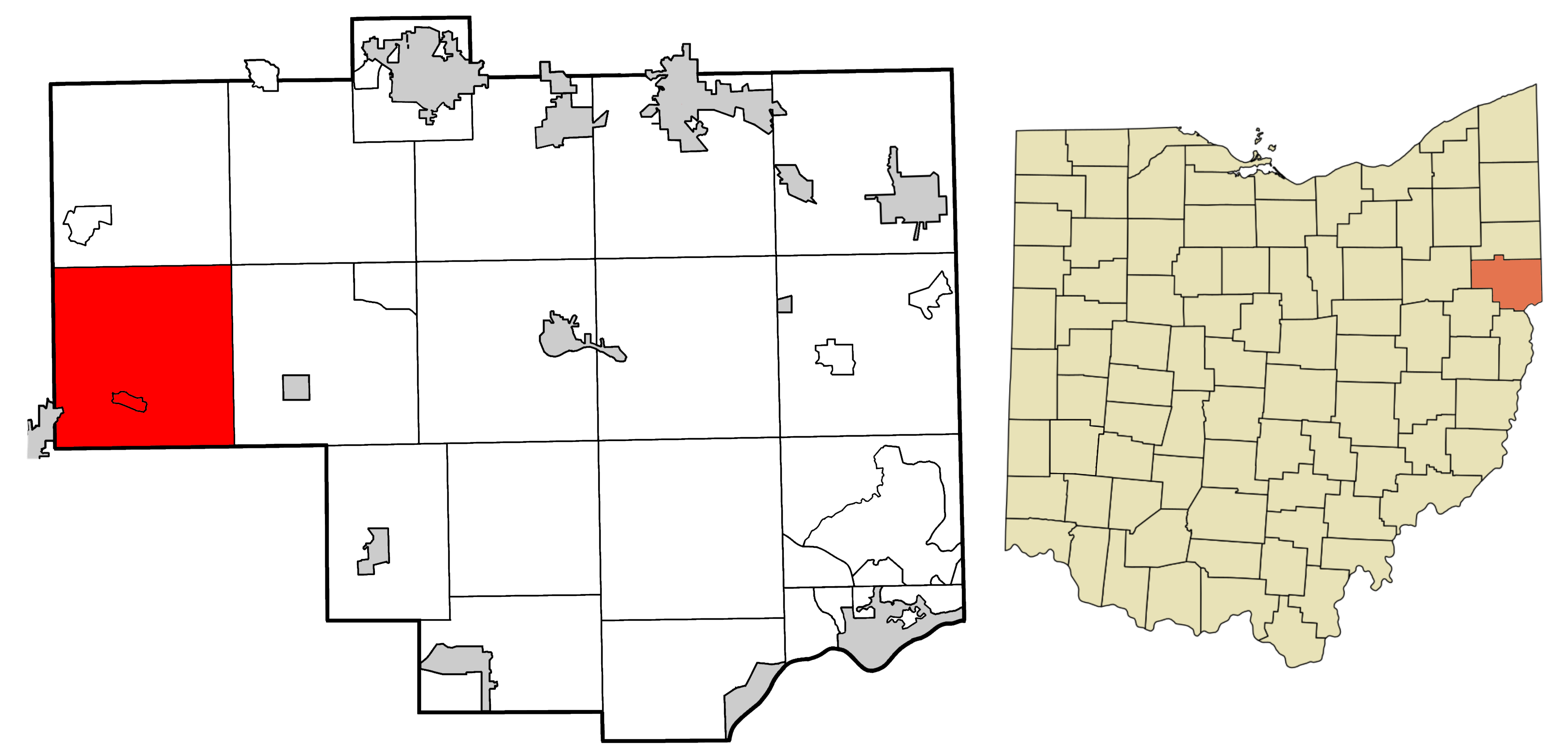
- Location of West Township in Columbiana County
- Coordinates: 40°46′11″N 81°2′13″W
- Country: United States
- State: Ohio
- County: Columbiana

Area
  - Total: 35.1 sq mi (90.9 km^{2})
  - Land: 34.9 sq mi (90.4 km^{2})
  - Water: 0.19 sq mi (0.5 km^{2})
- Elevation: 1,112 ft (339 m)

Population (2020)
  - Total: 3,173
  - Density: 90.9/sq mi (35.1/km^{2})
- Time zone: UTC-5 (Eastern (EST))
  - Summer (DST): UTC-4 (EDT)
- FIPS code: 39-82852
- GNIS feature ID: 1085907

West Township is one of the eighteen townships of Columbiana County, Ohio, United States. The 2020 census reported 3,173 people living in the township.

== Geography ==
Located in the western part of the county, it borders the following townships:

- Knox Township - north
- Butler Township - northeast corner
- Hanover Township - east
- East Township, Carroll County - southeast
- Augusta Township, Carroll County - south
- Brown Township, Carroll County - southwest corner
- Paris Township, Stark County - west
- Washington Township, Stark County - northwest corner

One village and one unincorporated community are located in West Township:

- The village of Minerva, in the southwest
- The census-designated place of East Rochester, in the south

== Name and history ==
Historical population
Census	Pop.	Note	%±
1980	3,022		—
1990	3,162		4.6%
2000	3,351		6.0%
2010	3,307		−1.3%
2020	3,173		−4.1%

It is the only West Township statewide.

The township was organized in 1814.

== Government ==
The township is governed by a three-member board of trustees, who are elected in November of odd-numbered years to a four-year term beginning on the following January 1. Two are elected in the year after the presidential election and one is elected in the year before it. There is also an elected township fiscal officer, who serves a four-year term beginning on April 1 of the year after the election, which is held in November of the year before the presidential election. Vacancies in the fiscal officership or on the board of trustees are filled by the remaining trustees.

=== Township Trustees ===
- Elton Lowmiller, Chairman
- Ray Davis, Vice Chairman
- Glenn Whiteleather

=== Fiscal Officer ===
- Mandy Lowmiller
