= Union Township, Carroll County, Ohio =

Township in Ohio, US

- Township
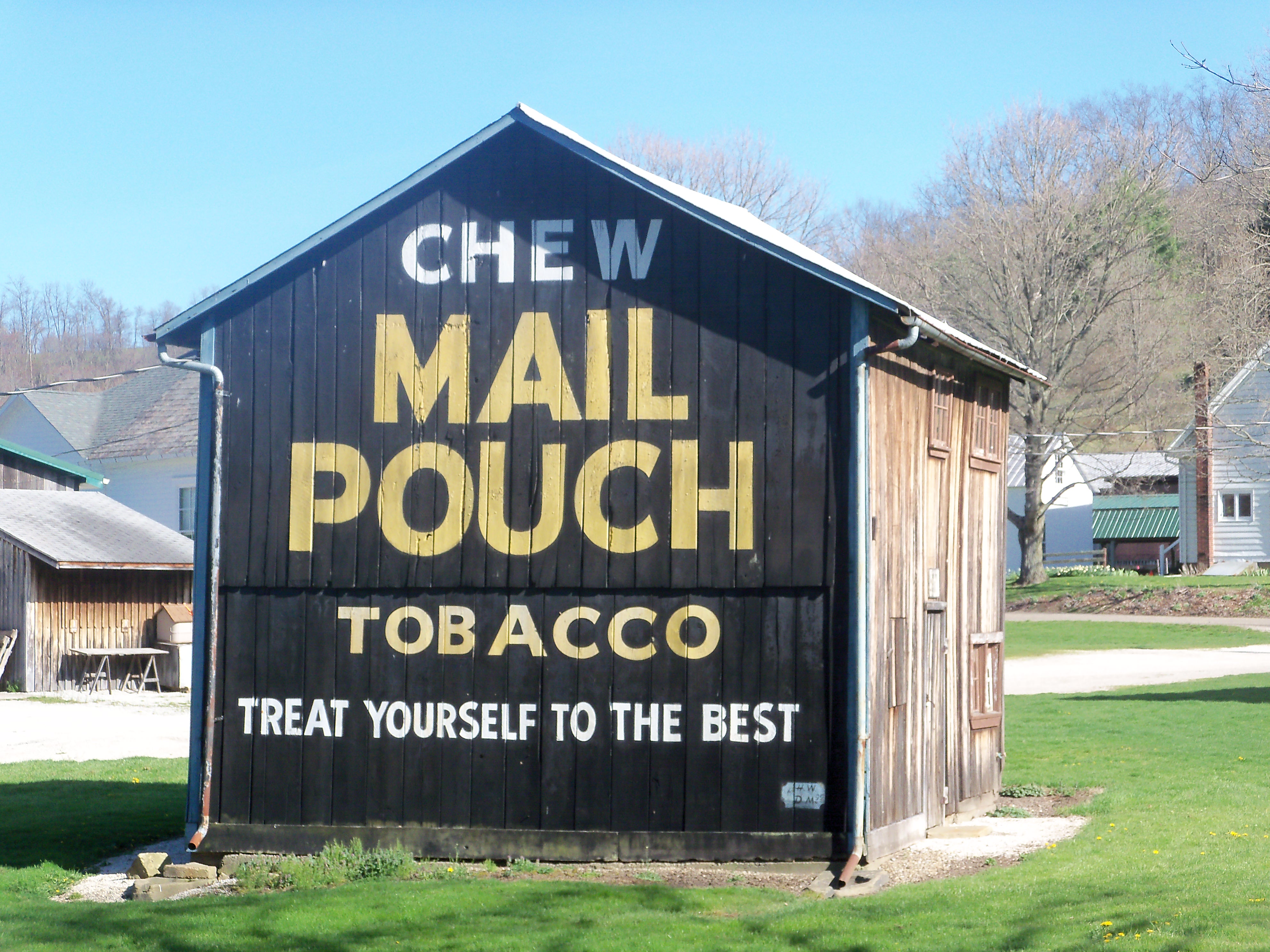
- Algonquin Mill Barn in Petersburg, Union Township

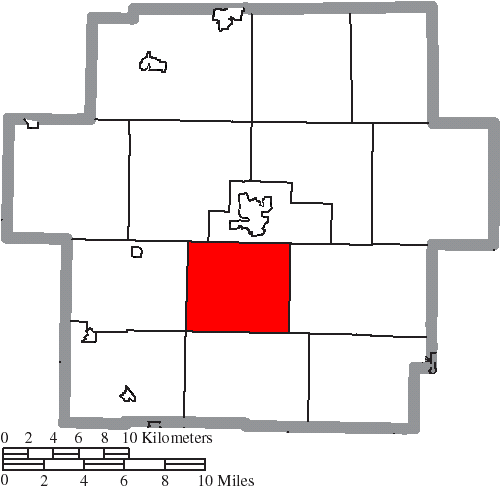
- Location of Union Township in Carroll County
- Coordinates: 40°30′50″N 81°6′28″W
- Country: United States
- State: Ohio
- County: Carroll

Area
  - Total: 22.6 sq mi (58.6 km^{2})
  - Land: 22.5 sq mi (58.3 km^{2})
  - Water: 0.15 sq mi (0.4 km^{2})
- Elevation: 1,161 ft (354 m)

Population (2020)
  - Total: 868
  - Density: 39/sq mi (14.9/km^{2})
- Time zone: UTC-5 (Eastern (EST))
  - Summer (DST): UTC-4 (EDT)
- FIPS code: 39-78260
- GNIS feature ID: 1085836

Union Township is one of the fourteen townships of Carroll County, Ohio, United States. As of the 2020 census, the population was 868.

== Geography ==
Located in the south central part of the county, it borders the following townships:

- Center Township - northeast
- Lee Township - east
- Perry Township - south
- Orange Township - southwest corner
- Monroe Township - west
- Harrison Township - northwest

No municipalities are located in Union Township.

== Name and history ==
It is one of twenty-seven Union Townships statewide. It was named Union because it was formed as a union from more than one previous townships.

== Government ==
Historical population
Census	Pop.	Note	%±
1840	889		—
1850	804		−9.6%
1860	664		−17.4%
1870	609		−8.3%
1880	684		12.3%
1890	653		−4.5%
1900	578		−11.5%
1910	513		−11.2%
1920	513		0.0%
1930	432		−15.8%
1940	497		15.0%
1950	515		3.6%
1960	460		−10.7%
1970	482		4.8%
1980	830		72.2%
1990	900		8.4%
2000	1,059		17.7%
2010	977		−7.7%
2020	868		−11.2%

The township is governed by a three-member board of trustees, who are elected in November of odd-numbered years to a four-year term beginning on the following January 1. Two are elected in the year after the presidential election and one is elected in the year before it. There is also an elected township fiscal officer, who serves a four-year term beginning on April 1 of the year after the election, which is held in November of the year before the presidential election. Vacancies in the fiscal officership or on the board of trustees are filled by the remaining trustees.

== Education ==
Students attend the Carrollton Exempted Village School District.
