= Augusta Township, Ohio =

Township in Ohio, US

Augusta Township, Carroll County, Ohio
- Township
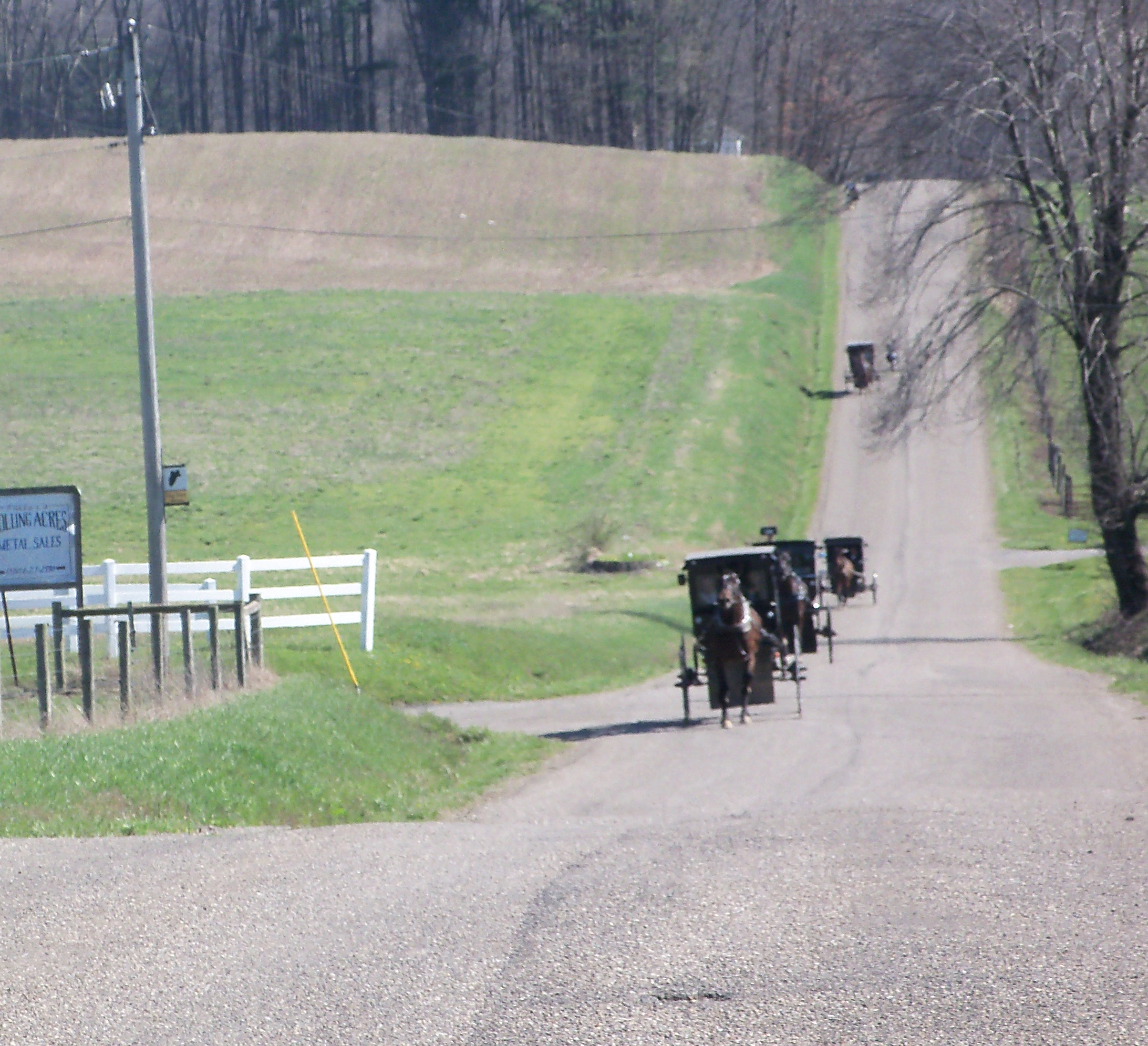
- Sunday afternoon traffic on Andora Road

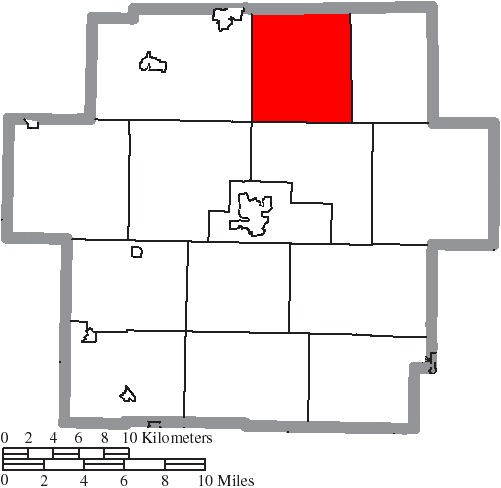
- Location of Augusta Township in Carroll County
- Coordinates: 40°41′26″N 81°2′32″W
- Country: United States
- State: Ohio
- County: Carroll

Area
  - Total: 27.8 sq mi (72.1 km^{2})
  - Land: 27.8 sq mi (72.1 km^{2})
  - Water: 0 sq mi (0.0 km^{2})
- Elevation: 1,119 ft (341 m)

Population (2020)
  - Total: 1,531
  - Density: 55/sq mi (21.2/km^{2})
- Time zone: UTC-5 (Eastern (EST))
  - Summer (DST): UTC-4 (EDT)
- ZIP code: 44607
- Area code: 330
- FIPS code: 39-03030
- GNIS feature ID: 1085824

Augusta Township is one of the fourteen townships of Carroll County, Ohio, United States. As of the 2020 census it had a population of 1,531.

== Geography ==
Located in the northern part of the county, it borders the following townships:

- West Township, Columbiana County - north
- East Township - east
- Washington Township - south
- Harrison Township - southwest corner
- Brown Township - west
- Paris Township, Stark County - northwest corner

No municipalities are located in Augusta Township, although the unincorporated community of Augusta lies in the township's east.

Ohio State Route 9 passes through the township, leading southwest 9 miles (14 km) from Augusta village to Carrollton, the county seat, and northeast 7 miles (11 km) to Hanoverton.

== Name and history ==
It is the only Augusta Township statewide. Augusta Township was formally part of Columbiana County until the creation of Carroll county in 1833.

== Government ==
Historical population
Census	Pop.	Note	%±
1820	533		—
1830	1,081		102.8%
1840	1,234		14.2%
1850	1,297		5.1%
1860	1,071		−17.4%
1870	1,015		−5.2%
1880	1,126		10.9%
1890	1,021		−9.3%
1900	985		−3.5%
1910	866		−12.1%
1920	799		−7.7%
1930	933		16.8%
1940	985		5.6%
1950	1,169		18.7%
1960	1,246		6.6%
1970	1,281		2.8%
1980	1,394		8.8%
1990	1,369		−1.8%
2000	1,599		16.8%
2010	1,619		1.3%
2020	1,531		−5.4%

The township is governed by a three-member board of trustees, who are elected in November of odd-numbered years to a four-year term beginning on the following January 1. Two are elected in the year after the presidential election and one is elected in the year before it. There is also an elected township fiscal officer, who serves a four-year term beginning on April 1 of the year after the election, which is held in November of the year before the presidential election. Vacancies in the fiscal officership or on the board of trustees are filled by the remaining trustees.

== Education ==
Students attend the Minerva Local School District in the Northwestern part and Carrollton Exempted Village School District in most of the township.
