= East Township, Ohio =

Township in Ohio, US

East Township, Carroll County, Ohio
- Township
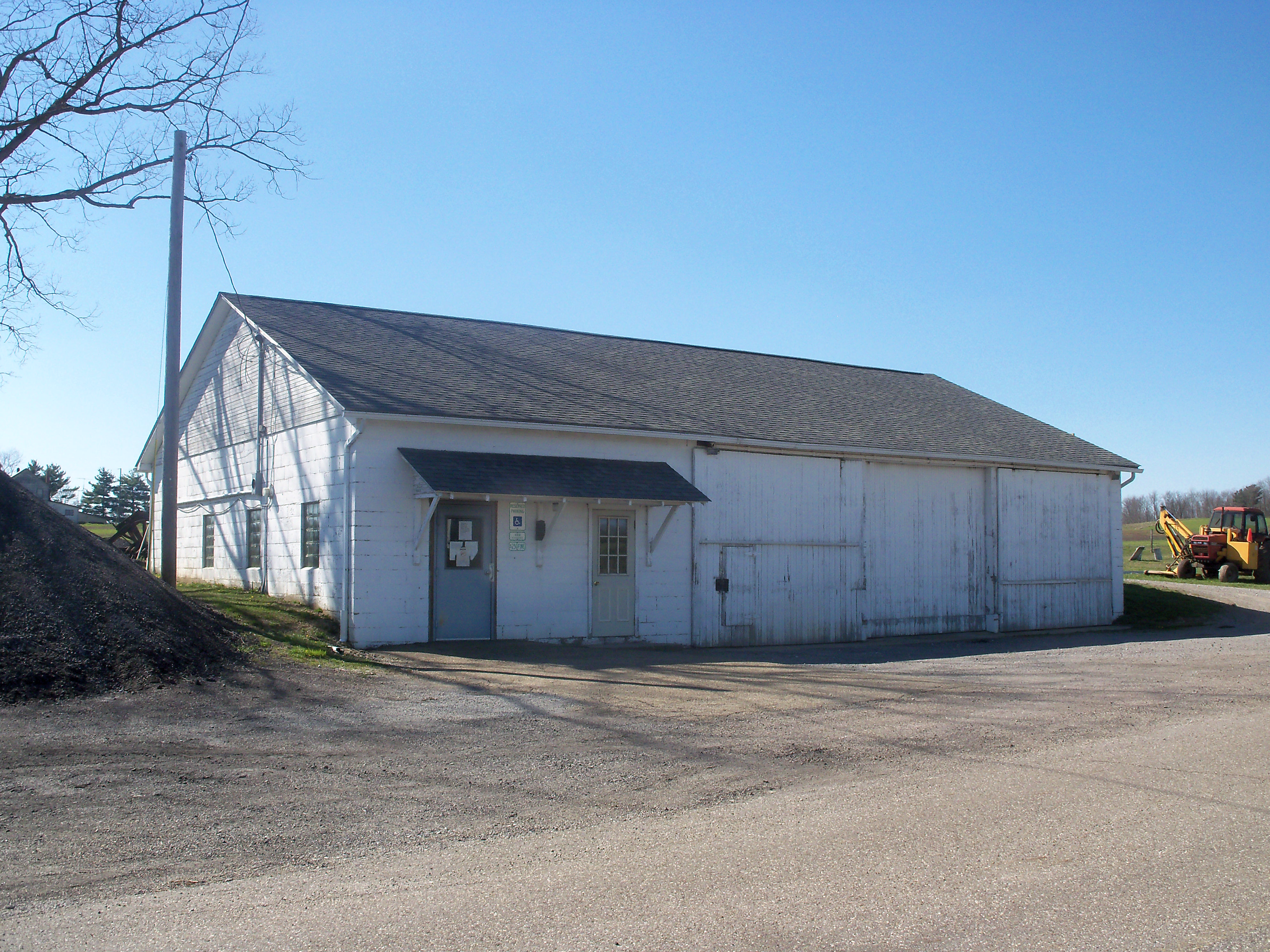
- Trustees meet at this building

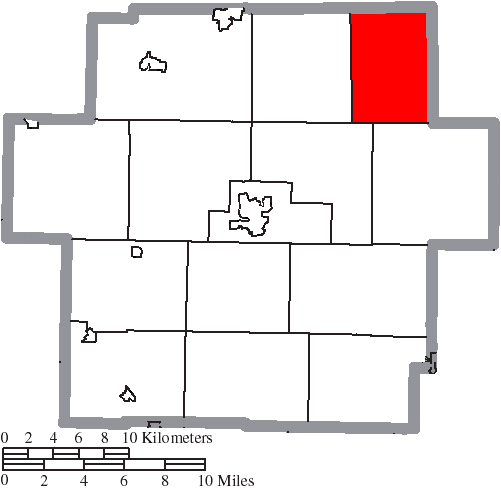
- Location of East Township in Carroll County
- Coordinates: 40°40′51″N 80°57′37″W
- Country: United States
- State: Ohio
- County: Carroll

Area
  - Total: 23.06 sq mi (59.72 km^{2})
  - Land: 23.04 sq mi (59.67 km^{2})
  - Water: 0.019 sq mi (0.05 km^{2})
- Elevation: 1,217 ft (371 m)

Population (2010)
  - Total: 808
  - Density: 35/sq mi (13.5/km^{2})
- Time zone: UTC-5 (Eastern (EST))
  - Summer (DST): UTC-4 (EDT)
- FIPS code: 39-23226
- GNIS feature ID: 1085827

East Township is one of the fourteen townships of Carroll County, Ohio, United States. As of the 2020 census, the population was 808.

== Geography ==
Located in the northeastern corner of the county, it borders the following townships:

- Hanover Township, Columbiana County - northeast
- Franklin Township, Columbiana County - east
- Fox Township - southeast
- Washington Township - southwest
- Augusta Township - west
- West Township, Columbiana County - northwest

No municipalities are located in East Township.

== Name and history ==
It is the only East Township statewide.

This township was originally under the name of Franklin Township, in Columbiana County. It contains three rows of sections out of the original surveyed township 14, range 4, together with six sections taken off Augusta Township by the county commissioners.

== Government ==
Historical population
Census	Pop.	Note	%±
1820	620		—
1830	1,219		96.6%
1840	995		−18.4%
1850	987		−0.8%
1860	907		−8.1%
1870	827		−8.8%
1880	868		5.0%
1890	640		−26.3%
1900	606		−5.3%
1910	572		−5.6%
1920	500		−12.6%
1930	468		−6.4%
1940	519		10.9%
1950	563		8.5%
1960	650		15.5%
1970	554		−14.8%
1980	742		33.9%
1990	734		−1.1%
2000	859		17.0%
2010	843		−1.9%
2020	808		−4.2%

The township is governed by a three-member board of trustees, who are elected in November of odd-numbered years to a four-year term beginning on the following January 1. Two are elected in the year after the presidential election and one is elected in the year before it. There is also an elected township fiscal officer, who serves a four-year term beginning on April 1 of the year after the election, which is held in November of the year before the presidential election. Vacancies in the fiscal officership or on the board of trustees are filled by the remaining trustees.

== Education ==
Students attend the Carrollton Exempted Village School District.
