= Perry Township, Carroll County, Ohio =

Township in Ohio, US

- Township
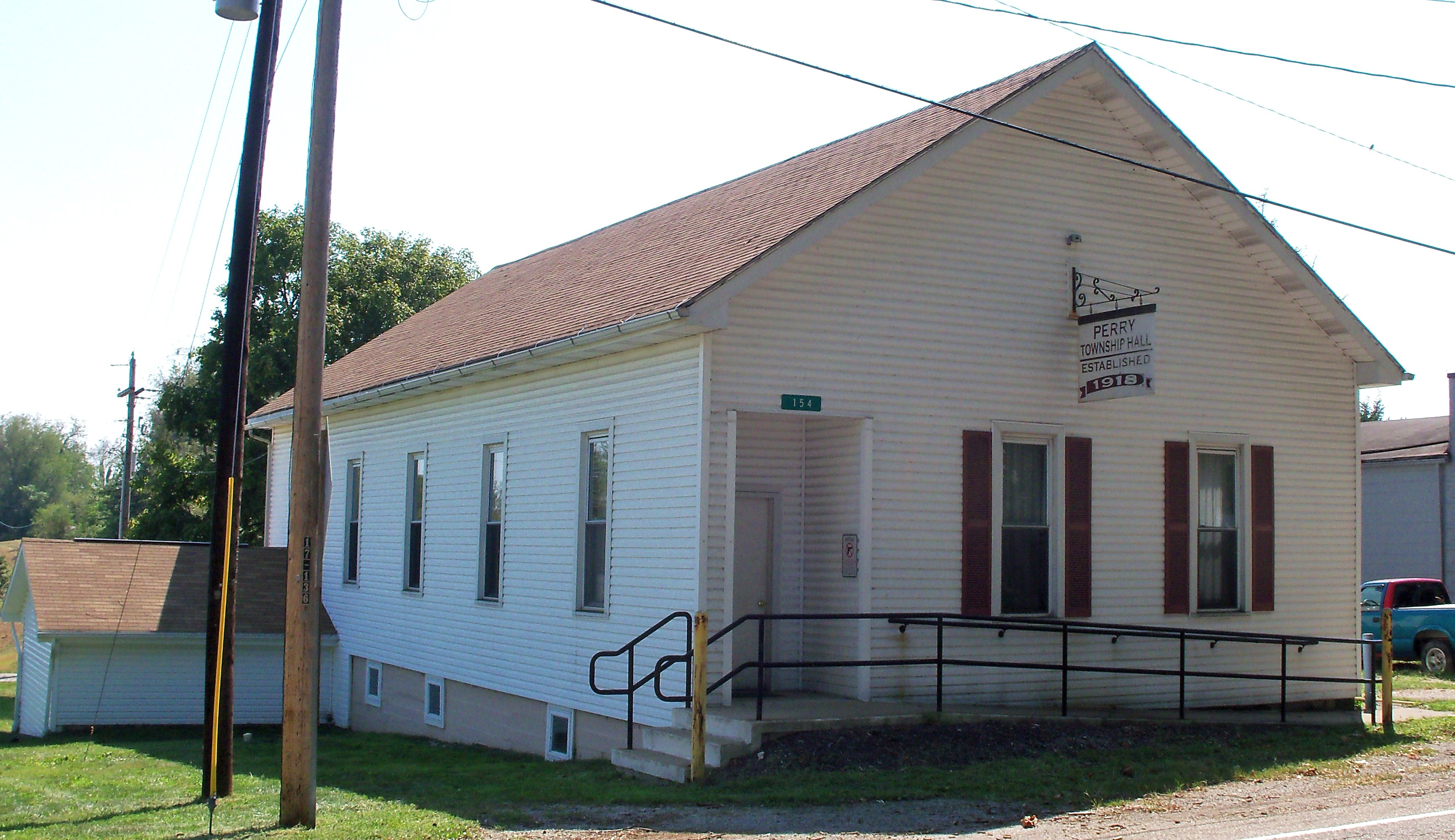
- Perry Township Hall

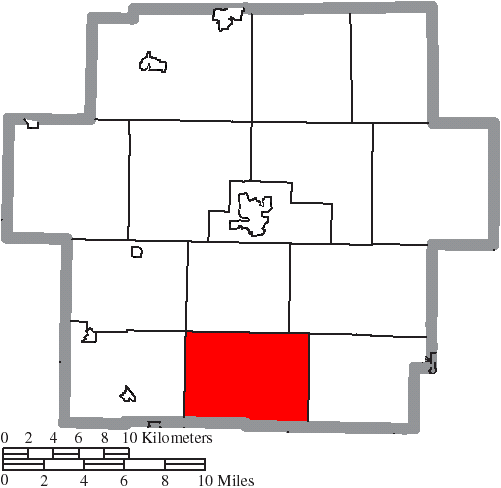
- Location of Perry Township in Carroll County
- Coordinates: 40°27′54″N 81°5′43″W
- Country: United States
- State: Ohio
- County: Carroll

Area
  - Total: 28.0 sq mi (72.5 km^{2})
  - Land: 27.8 sq mi (72.1 km^{2})
  - Water: 0.19 sq mi (0.5 km^{2})
- Elevation: 1,263 ft (385 m)

Population (2020)
  - Total: 934
  - Density: 34/sq mi (13/km^{2})
- Time zone: UTC-5 (Eastern (EST))
  - Summer (DST): UTC-4 (EDT)
- FIPS code: 39-61784
- GNIS feature ID: 1085834

Perry Township is one of the fourteen townships of Carroll County, Ohio, United States. As of the 2020 census, the population was 934.

== Geography ==
Located in the southern part of the county, it borders the following townships:

- Union Township - north
- Lee Township - northeast
- Loudon Township - east
- Rumley Township, Harrison County - southeast
- North Township, Harrison County - south
- Monroe Township, Harrison County - southwest
- Orange Township - west
- Monroe Township - northwest corner

No municipalities are located in Perry Township.

The offices and maintenance garage are located in the unincorporated community of Perrysville, which was platted in 1835. A post office was established in 1848, and continued until 1954. To distinguish this place from Perrysville in Ashland County, the postal service called the place Lamartine.

== Name and history ==
It is one of twenty-six Perry Townships statewide.

The township was originally called "North", but was renamed shortly after the formation of Carroll County.

== Government ==
Historical population
Census	Pop.	Note	%±
1840	1,344		—
1850	1,277		−5.0%
1860	1,060		−17.0%
1870	932		−12.1%
1880	1,040		11.6%
1890	950		−8.7%
1900	825		−13.2%
1910	766		−7.2%
1920	656		−14.4%
1930	617		−5.9%
1940	674		9.2%
1950	636		−5.6%
1960	693		9.0%
1970	617		−11.0%
1980	896		45.2%
1990	912		1.8%
2000	1,022		12.1%
2010	996		−2.5%
2020	934		−6.2%

The township is governed by a three-member board of trustees, who are elected in November of odd-numbered years to a four-year term beginning on the following January 1. Two are elected in the year after the presidential election and one is elected in the year before it. There is also an elected township fiscal officer, who serves a four-year term beginning on April 1 of the year after the election, which is held in November of the year before the presidential election. Vacancies in the fiscal officership or on the board of trustees are filled by the remaining trustees.

== Education ==
Students attend the Carrollton Exempted Village School District in most of the township.
