= Mechanicstown, Ohio =

- Unincorporated community
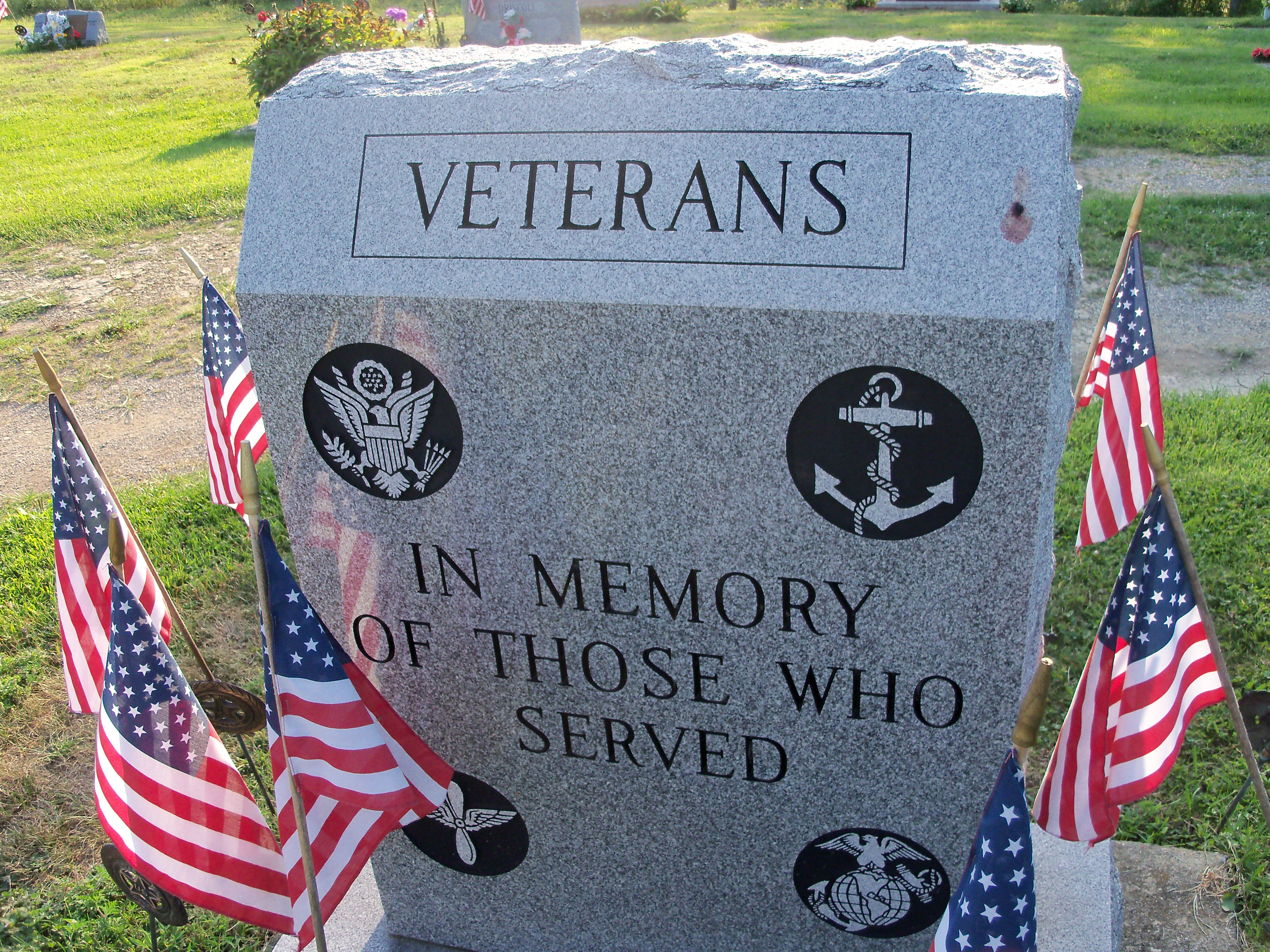
- Mechanicstown Veterans Memorial

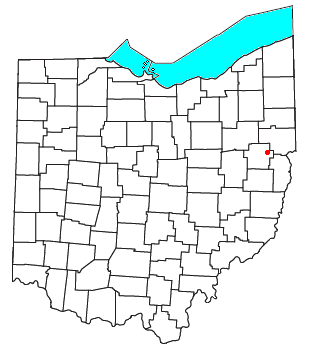
- Location of Mechanicstown, Ohio
- Coordinates: 40°37′07″N 80°57′04″W
- Country: United States
- State: Ohio
- County: Carroll
- Township: Fox
- Elevation: 1,253 ft (382 m)
- Time zone: UTC-5 (Eastern (EST))
  - Summer (DST): UTC-4 (EDT)
- ZIP code: 44651
- Area code: 330
- GNIS Feature ID: 1061502

Mechanicstown is an unincorporated community in northwestern Fox Township, Carroll County, Ohio, United States. It has a post office with the ZIP code 44651. It lies at the intersection of State Routes 39 and 524. The community is part of the Canton–Massillon Metropolitan Statistical Area.

== History ==
The community was laid out in 1836 by Thomas McGavern. On March 21, 1837, the Ohio General Assembly approved a name change from "Mechanicsburgh" to "Mechanicstown."

Willis Elementary, of the Carrollton Exempted Village School District and located outside of town, was closed in 2008.

== Education ==
Students attend schools in the Carrollton Exempted Village School District.

== Notable people ==
- Thomas B. Fletcher — five-term U.S. Representative
- Wilbur S. Jackman - educator
