= Washington Township, Carroll County, Ohio =

Township in Ohio, US

- Township
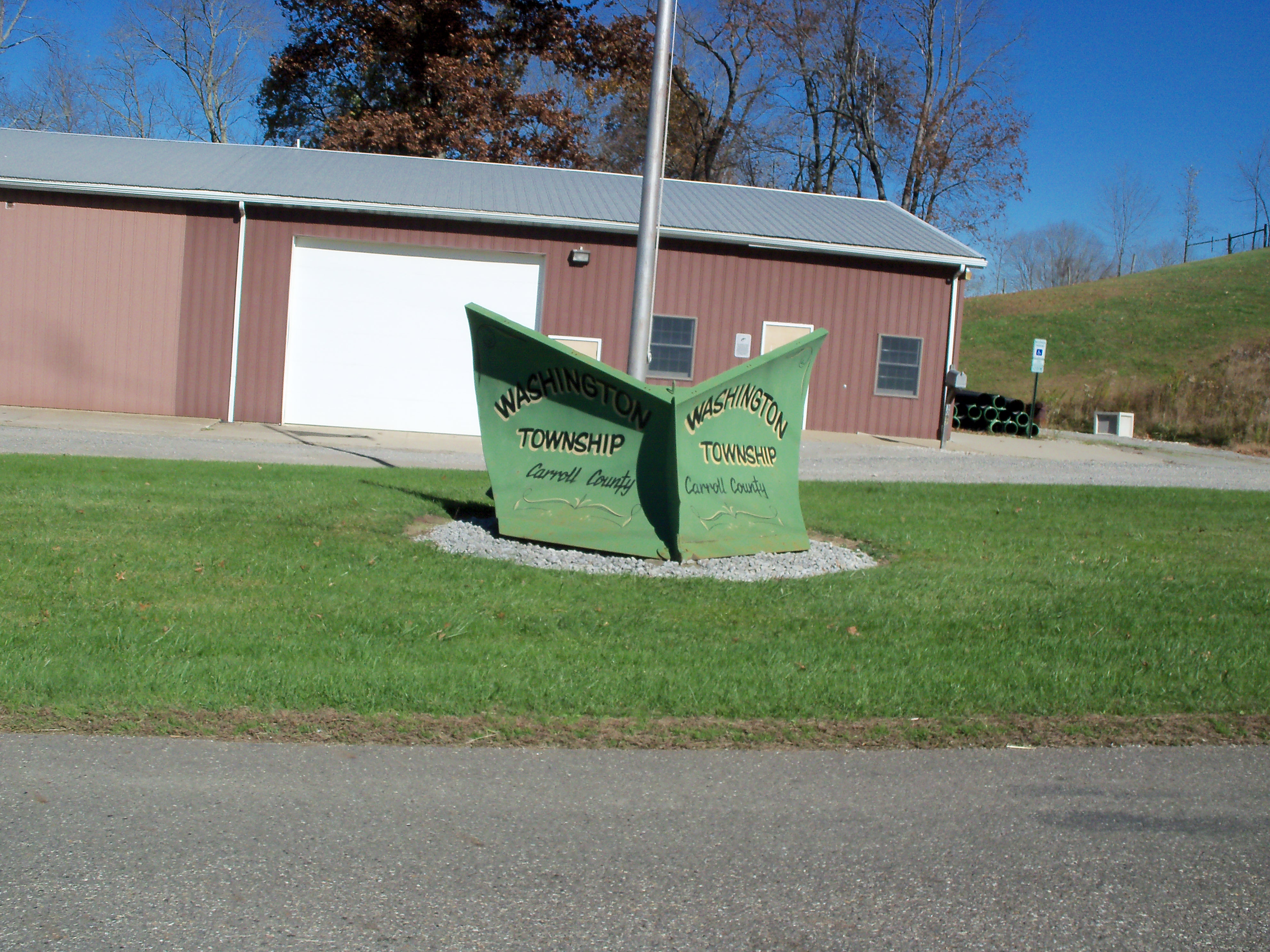
- Township garage and meeting house

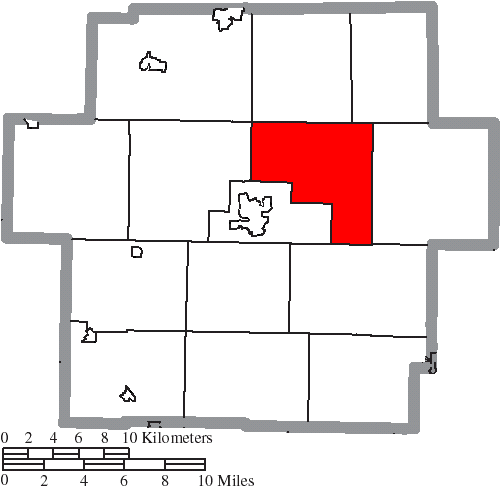
- Location of Washington Township in Carroll County
- Coordinates: 40°36′43″N 81°1′32″W
- Country: United States
- State: Ohio
- County: Carroll

Area
  - Total: 26.02 sq mi (67.40 km^{2})
  - Land: 26.00 sq mi (67.33 km^{2})
  - Water: 0.027 sq mi (0.07 km^{2})
- Elevation: 1,273 ft (388 m)

Population (2020)
  - Total: 1,116
  - Density: 43/sq mi (16.6/km^{2})
- Time zone: UTC-5 (Eastern (EST))
  - Summer (DST): UTC-4 (EDT)
- FIPS code: 39-81116
- GNIS feature ID: 1085837

Washington Township is one of the fourteen townships of Carroll County, Ohio, United States. As of the 2020 census, the population was 1,116.

== Geography ==
Located in the east central part of the county, it borders the following townships:

- Augusta Township - north
- East Township - northeast
- Fox Township - east
- Lee Township - south
- Center Township - southwest
- Harrison Township - west
- Brown Township - northwest corner

No municipalities are located in Washington Township.

== Name and history ==
It is one of forty-three Washington Townships statewide. Originally designated Township 14 of Range 5 of the Old Seven Ranges, it was named "Washington" because many of the early settlers and pioneers came from Washington, Pennsylvania. The township became a part of Columbiana County when it was formed on 1 May 1803, then was admitted whole into Carroll County when it was established in December 1832. In March 1836, the county commissioners took part of Washington Township along with a part of Harrison Township to form Centre (later Center) Township.

== Government ==
Historical population
Census	Pop.	Note	%±
1820	700		—
1830	1,447		106.7%
1840	1,041		−28.1%
1850	1,020		−2.0%
1860	749		−26.6%
1870	740		−1.2%
1880	750		1.4%
1890	664		−11.5%
1900	634		−4.5%
1910	601		−5.2%
1920	523		−13.0%
1930	525		0.4%
1940	542		3.2%
1950	536		−1.1%
1960	601		12.1%
1970	697		16.0%
1980	772		10.8%
1990	813		5.3%
2000	1,061		30.5%
2010	1,239		16.8%
2020	1,116		−9.9%

The township is governed by a three-member board of trustees, who are elected in November of odd-numbered years to a four-year term beginning on the following January 1. Two are elected in the year after the presidential election and one is elected in the year before it. There is also an elected township fiscal officer, who serves a four-year term beginning on April 1 of the year after the election, which is held in November of the year before the presidential election. Vacancies in the fiscal officership or on the board of trustees are filled by the remaining trustees.

== Education ==
Students attend the Carrollton Exempted Village School District.
