= Augusta, Ohio =

Unincorporated community in Ohio, U.S.

Coordinates: 40°41′09″N 81°01′15″W

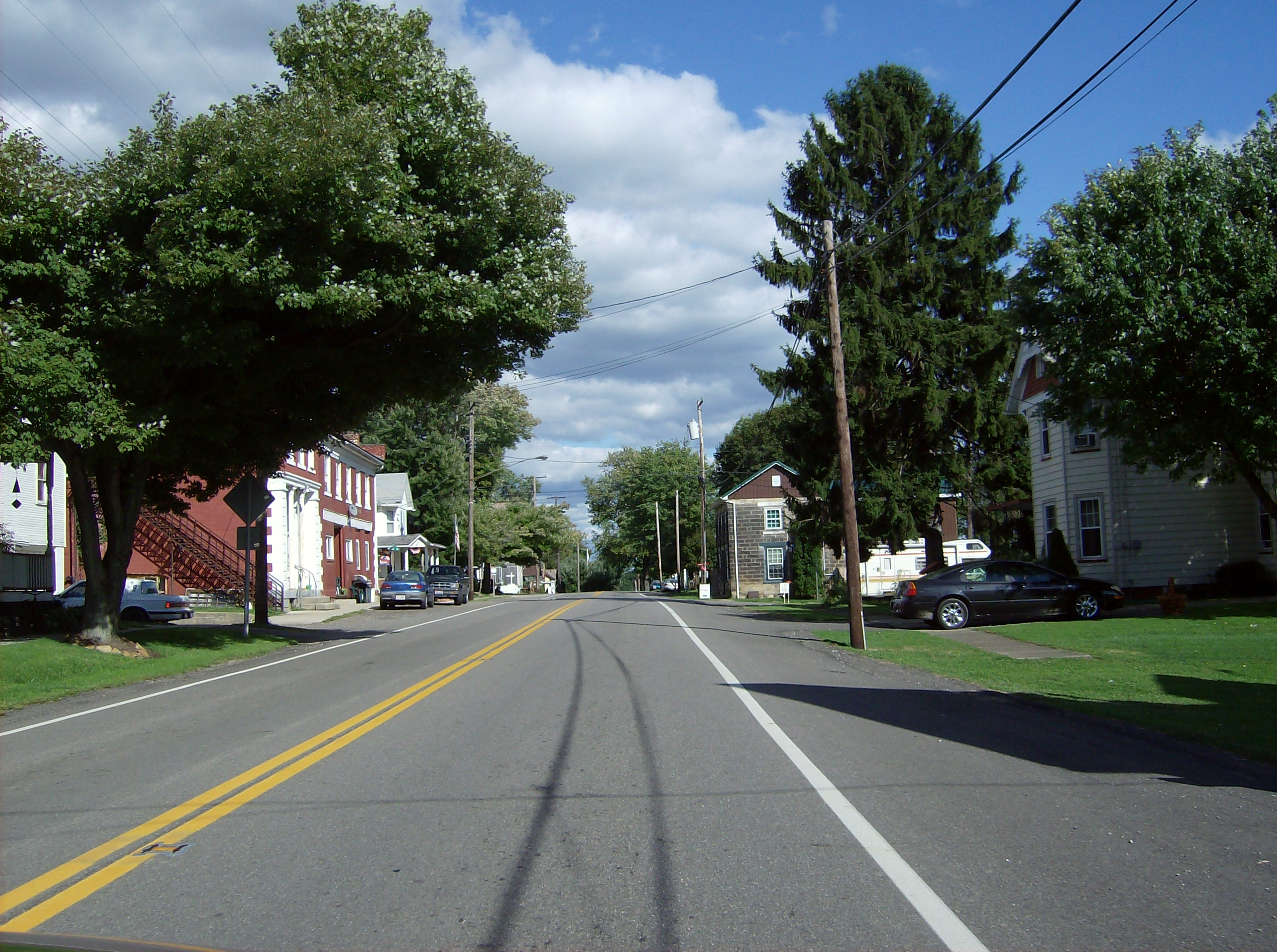
Central Augusta

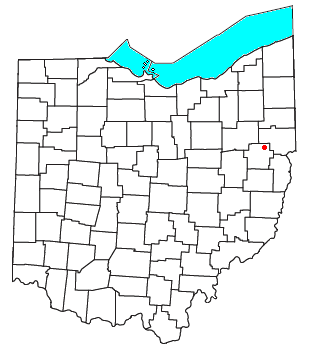
Location of Augusta, Ohio

Augusta is an unincorporated community in eastern Augusta Township, Carroll County, Ohio, United States. It has a post office with the ZIP code 44607. It lies along State Route 9. The community is part of the Canton–Massillon Metropolitan Statistical Area.

== History ==
The village of Augusta was platted in 1811 by Jacob Brown.

== Geography ==
The community is at an altitude of 1230 feet and is located Northeast of Carrollton, Ohio and Southeast of Minerva, Ohio.

== Education ==
Students attend Carrollton Exempted Village School District. Students previously attended Augusta Elementary school, most recently grades K-6. Augusta Elementary School was demolished in 2019.

=== Augusta Elementary School ===
Augusta Elementary School was built in 1928. It was located at 3117 Aurora Rd NE, Carrollton, OH 44615. Augusta Elementary School was razed August 2019.
