= Wilbur S. Jackman =

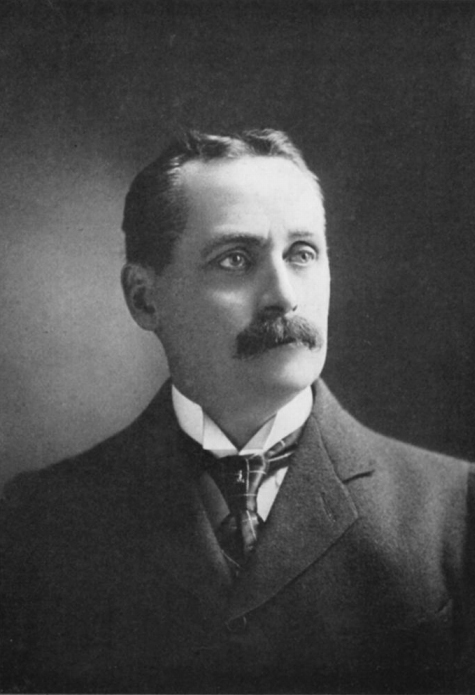
Wilbur S. Jackman

Wilbur Samuel Jackman (January 12, 1855 – January 28, 1907) was an American educator and one of the originators of the nature study movement.

Jackman was born in Mechanicstown, Ohio, and shortly after his birth the family moved to California, Pennsylvania, where he spent his boyhood growing up on a farm that his grandfather had obtained from the local Indians in exchange for a copper kettle. It was his childhood experiences that engendered him with a love of the outdoors and all the plants and animals that live there.

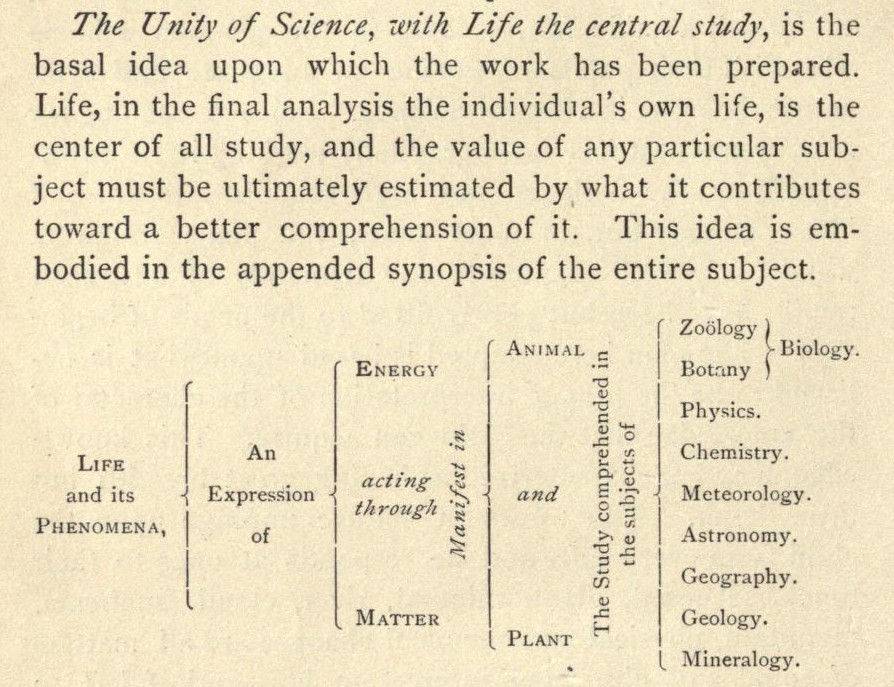
An overview of subjects from his 1894 book

Jackman continued his education at the California Normal School, travelling to school and back on horseback. He then went to Meadville College for three years. He then continued his education at Harvard University and graduated with a bachelor's degree from Harvard in 1884. On his way home after graduation he stopped at Pittsburgh, Pennsylvania, where he was promptly offered a job to teach natural science to high school students. Jackman was influenced by Johann Friedrich Herbart, Johann Pestalozzi, Friedrich Froebel and other European educators and believed that children's enthusiasm needed to be utilized to incorporate introductions to all subjects including mathematics, chemistry and biology within nature. It is while he is teaching high school in Pittsburgh that he formulated the nature-study idea. Colonel Francis W. Parker met him in 1889 and invited him to join the faculty at the Cook County Normal School in Chicago, Illinois. In the fall of 1890, Jackman published bimonthly pamphlets that were 75 pages each titled "Outlines in Elementary Science". In the spring of 1891, these pamphlets were synthesized into the important book published that allowed the whole world to learn about nature-study in his book Nature-Study for Common Schools. After this, he continued to refine his ideas of nature-study in different publications.

In 1904, Jackman was appointed dean of the growing School of Education of the University of Chicago (formerly the Cook County Normal School). He also served in this time as editor of the journal Elementary School Teacher.

Jackman died suddenly at the age of 52 from what was diagnosed as pneumonia.

== Sources ==
- Bailey, L. H. (1904). The nature-study idea: Being an interpretation of the new school-movement to put the child in sympathy with nature. New York: Doubleday, Page & Company.
- Jackman, W. S. (1891). Nature-study for the common schools. New York, NY: Henry Holt and Company.
- Jackman, W. S. (1894). Field work in nature study (second ed.). Chicago, Illinois: A. Flanagan.
- Jackman, W. S. (1904). The third yearbook of the National Society for the scientific study of education Part II nature-study. Chicago, IL: The University of Chicago Press.
