= Center Township, Ohio =

Center Township, Ohio, may refer to:

- Center Township, Carroll County, Ohio
- Center Township, Columbiana County, Ohio
- Center Township, Guernsey County, Ohio
- Center Township, Mercer County, Ohio
- Center Township, Monroe County, Ohio
- Center Township, Morgan County, Ohio
- Center Township, Noble County, Ohio
- Center Township, Williams County, Ohio
- Center Township, Wood County, Ohio
