= Loudon Township, Carroll County, Ohio =

Township in Ohio, US

- Township
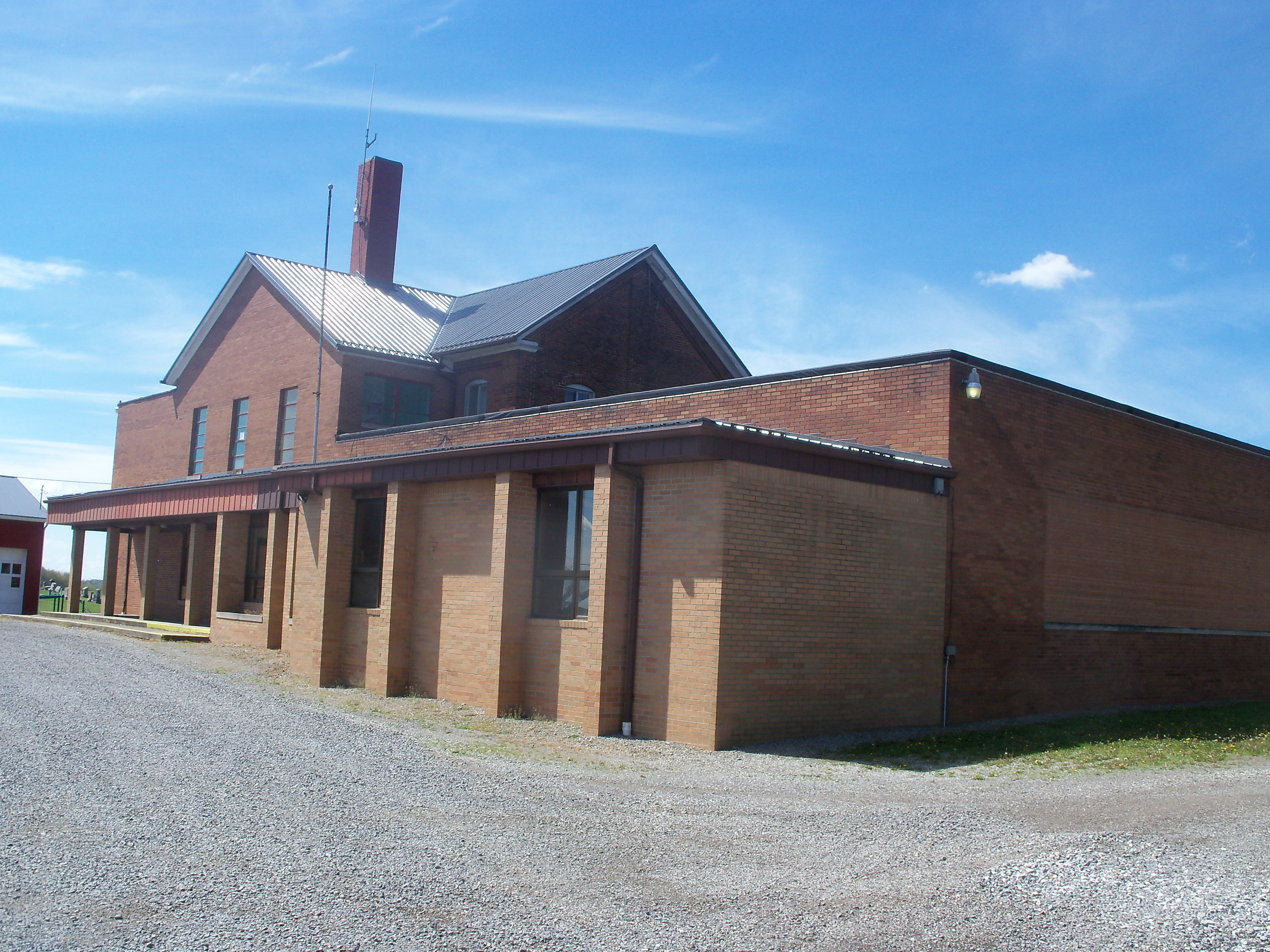
- Loudon Township Community Center, formerly Kilgore Elementary School

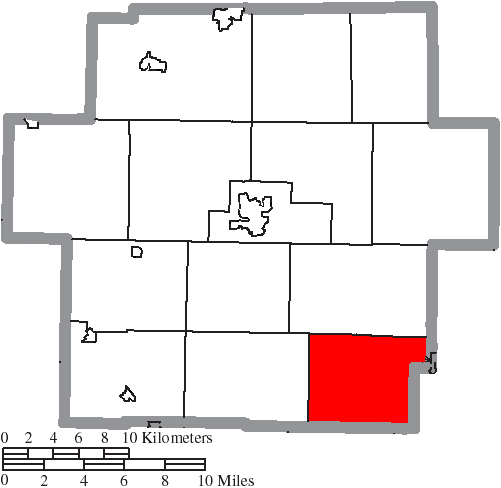
- Location of Loudon Township in Carroll County
- Coordinates: 40°27′38″N 80°58′43″W
- Country: United States
- State: Ohio
- County: Carroll

Area
  - Total: 25.3 sq mi (65.5 km^{2})
  - Land: 25.3 sq mi (65.5 km^{2})
  - Water: 0 sq mi (0.0 km^{2})
- Elevation: 1,175 ft (358 m)

Population (2020)
  - Total: 925
  - Density: 37/sq mi (14.1/km^{2})
- Time zone: UTC-5 (Eastern (EST))
  - Summer (DST): UTC-4 (EDT)
- FIPS code: 39-45038
- GNIS feature ID: 1085831

Loudon Township is one of the fourteen townships of Carroll County, Ohio, United States. As of the 2020 census, the population was 925.

== Geography ==
Located in the southeastern corner of the county, it borders the following townships:

- Lee Township - north
- Springfield Township, Jefferson County - east
- German Township, Harrison County - southeast
- Rumley Township, Harrison County - south
- Perry Township - west

No municipalities are located in Loudon Township.

== Name and history ==
Statewide, the only other Loudon Township is located in Seneca County.

At the March, 1836 meeting of the County commissioners the entry made was : "After reading and considering the petition for the erection and alteration of several townships in different parts of the county the following is moved": "A township named Loudon was ordered to be erected from the balance of the said Rock Township and Jefferson Township."

== Government ==
Historical population
Census	Pop.	Note	%±
1840	966		—
1850	840		−13.0%
1860	866		3.1%
1870	831		−4.0%
1880	965		16.1%
1890	929		−3.7%
1900	909		−2.2%
1910	925		1.8%
1920	852		−7.9%
1930	864		1.4%
1940	974		12.7%
1950	962		−1.2%
1960	1,156		20.2%
1970	1,107		−4.2%
1980	976		−11.8%
1990	933		−4.4%
2000	1,032		10.6%
2010	1,009		−2.2%
2020	925		−8.3%

The township is governed by a three-member board of trustees, who are elected in November of odd-numbered years to a four-year term beginning on the following January 1. Two are elected in the year after the presidential election and one is elected in the year before it. There is also an elected township fiscal officer, who serves a four-year term beginning on April 1 of the year after the election, which is held in November of the year before the presidential election. Vacancies in the fiscal officership or on the board of trustees are filled by the remaining trustees.

== Education ==
Students attend the Carrollton Exempted Village School District in most of the township and Edison Local School District near the village of Amsterdam.
