= New Franklin, Stark County, Ohio =

Unincorporated community in Ohio, U.S.

Coordinates: 40°47′54″N 81°05′31″W

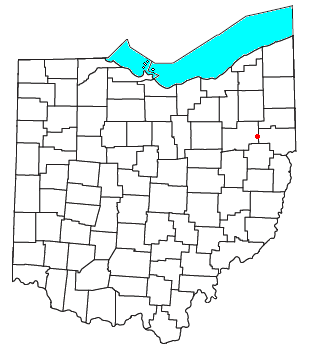
Location of New Franklin in Stark County

New Franklin is an unincorporated community in northeastern Paris Township, Stark County, Ohio, United States. The community is located at the intersection of State Routes 172 and 183. The community is part of the Canton–Massillon Metropolitan Statistical Area.

New Franklin was not officially platted. A post office was established at New Franklin in 1832, and remained in operation until 1915.

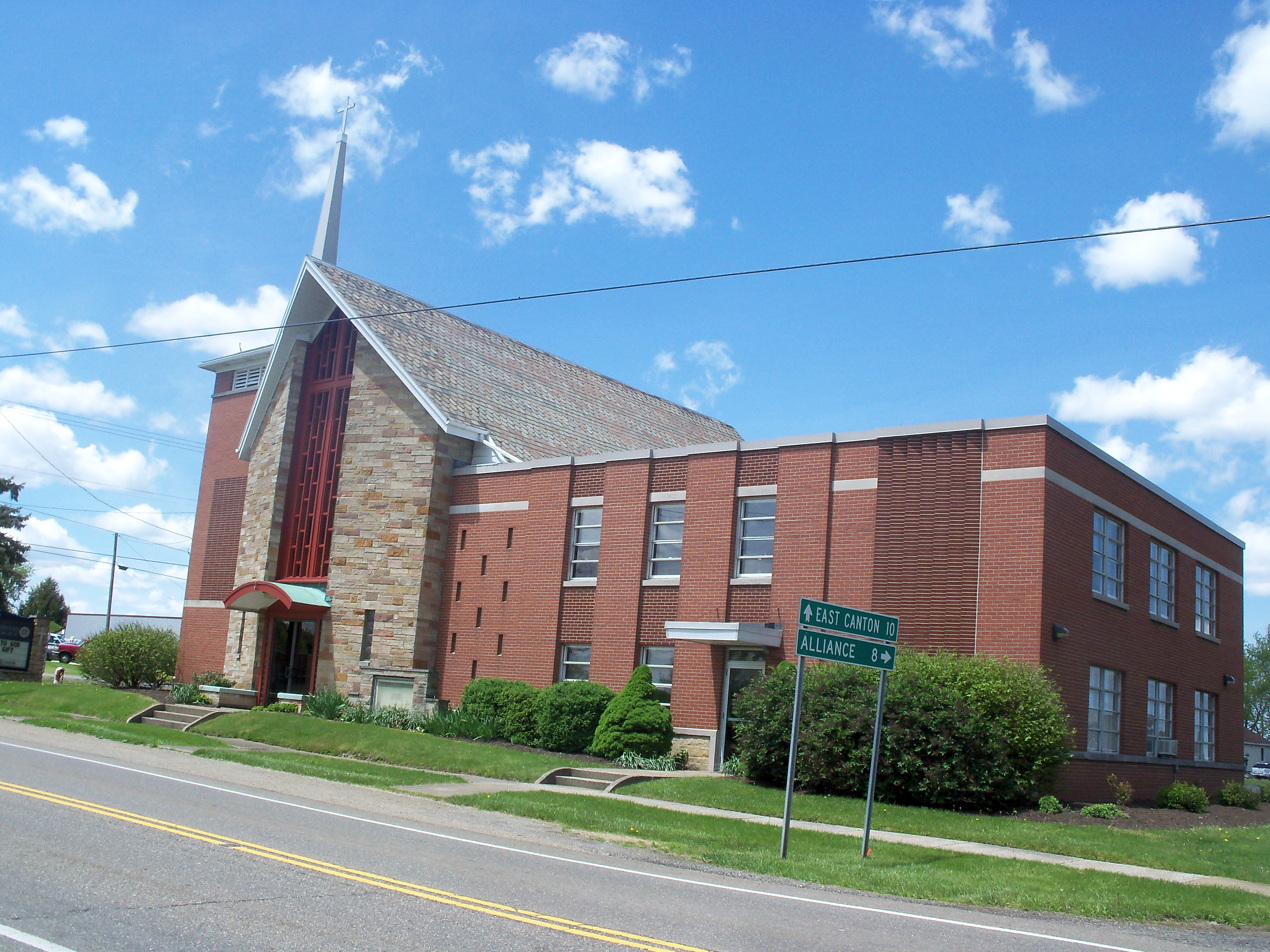
St. John's Lutheran Church
