= East Greenville, Ohio =

Unincorporated community in Ohio, U.S.

Coordinates: 40°47′58″N 81°37′28″W

East Greenville is an unincorporated community in Stark County, in the U.S. state of Ohio.

== History ==
East Greenville had its start when a post office called Greenville was established there in the 1820s. The name was changed to East Greenville in 1832, and the post office closed in 1914.
