= Paris Township, Stark County, Ohio =

Township in Ohio, US

- Township
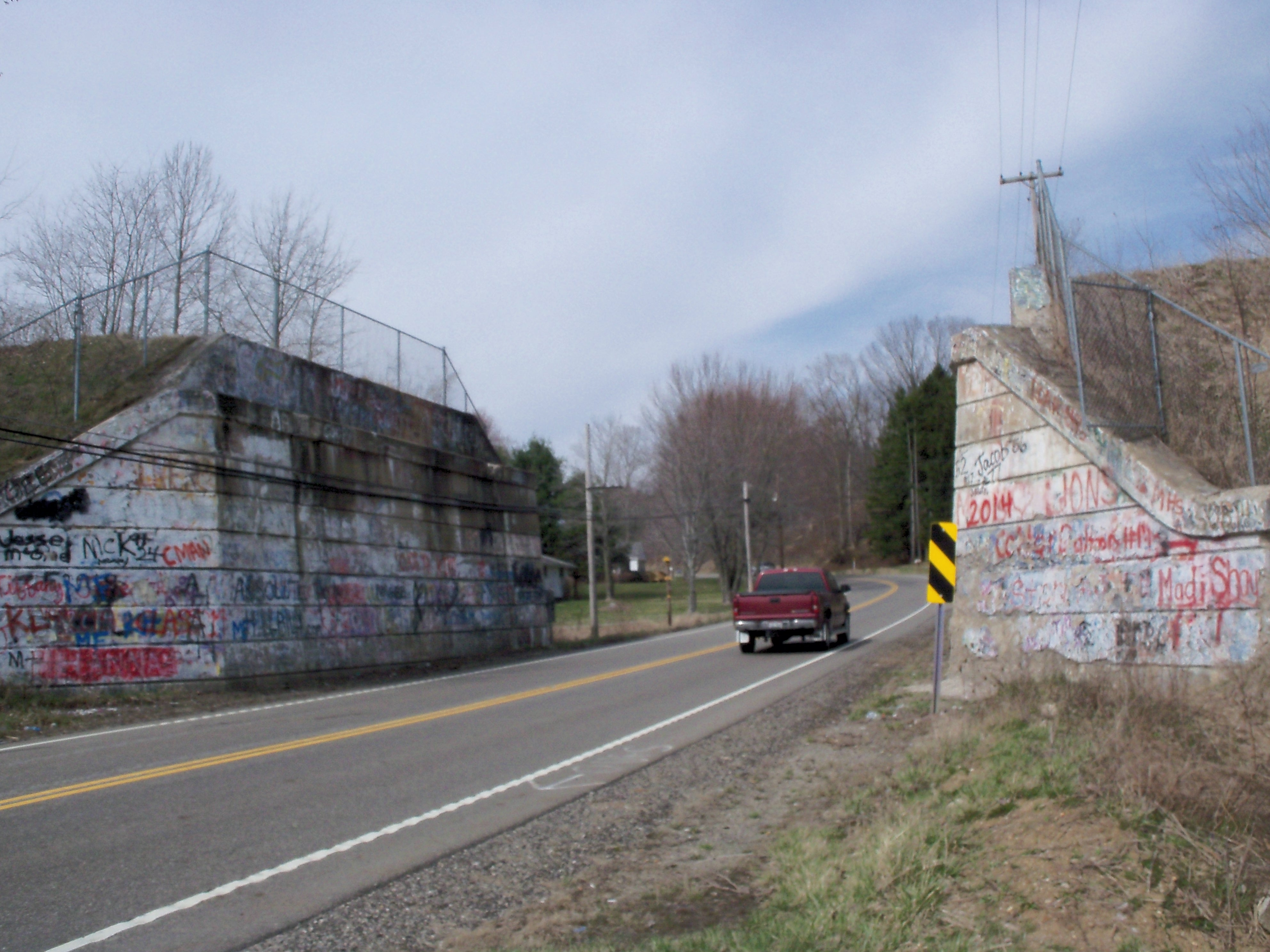
- This abandoned underpass has long been a target for Graffiti

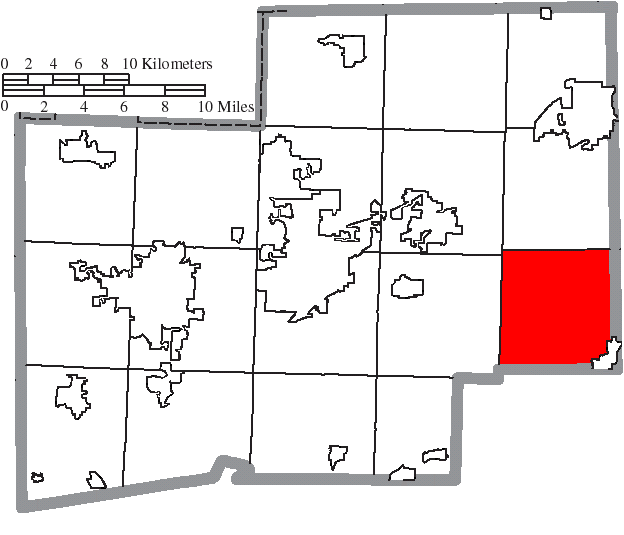
- Location of Paris Township in Stark County
- Coordinates: 40°45′25″N 81°7′18″W
- Country: United States
- State: Ohio
- County: Stark
- Organized: April 1, 1818

Area
  - Total: 33.7 sq mi (87.4 km^{2})
  - Land: 33.7 sq mi (87.2 km^{2})
  - Water: 0.077 sq mi (0.2 km^{2})
- Elevation: 938 ft (286 m)

Population (2020)
  - Total: 5,743
  - Density: 226/sq mi (87.2/km^{2})
- Time zone: UTC-5 (Eastern (EST))
  - Summer (DST): UTC-4 (EDT)
- ZIP code: 44669
- Area code: 330
- FIPS code: 39-59850
- GNIS feature ID: 1086985
- Website: https://paristwp.com/

Paris Township is one of the seventeen townships of Stark County, Ohio, United States. The 2020 census found 5,743 people in the township.

== Geography ==
Located in the southeastern corner part of the county, it borders the following townships:

- Washington Township - north
- Knox Township, Columbiana County - northeast corner
- West Township, Columbiana County - east
- Augusta Township, Carroll County - southeast corner
- Brown Township, Carroll County - south
- Osnaburg Township - west
- Nimishillen Township - northwest

Part of the village of Minerva is located in southeastern Paris Township, and three unincorporated communities lie in the township: New Franklin in the northeast, Paris in the northwest, and Robertsville in the west.

== Name and history ==
Statewide, other Paris Townships are located in Portage and Union counties.

In 1833, Paris Township contained four gristmills, seven saw mills, one fulling mill, one tannery, and five stores.

== Government ==
Historical population
| Census | Pop. | Note | %± |
|---|---|---|---|
| 1820 | 553 | | — |
| 1830 | 1,513 | | 173.6% |
| 1840 | 2,474 | | 63.5% |
| 1850 | 2,740 | | 10.8% |
| 1860 | 2,657 | | −3.0% |
| 1870 | 2,625 | | −1.2% |
| 1880 | 2,639 | | 0.5% |
| 1890 | 2,649 | | 0.4% |
| 1900 | 2,382 | | −10.1% |
| 1910 | 2,351 | | −1.3% |
| 1920 | 2,689 | | 14.4% |
| 1930 | 3,224 | | 19.9% |
| 1940 | 3,679 | | 14.1% |
| 1950 | 4,173 | | 13.4% |
| 1960 | 4,994 | | 19.7% |
| 1970 | 6,038 | | 20.9% |
| 1990 | 5,907 | | — |
| 2000 | 5,969 | | 1.0% |
| 2010 | 5,728 | | −4.0% |
| 2020 | 5,743 | | 0.3% |

The township is governed by a three-member board of trustees, who are elected in November of odd-numbered years to a four-year term beginning on the following January 1. Two are elected in the year after the presidential election and one is elected in the year before it. There is also an elected township fiscal officer, who serves a four-year term beginning on April 1 of the year after the election, which is held in November of the year before the presidential election. Vacancies in the fiscal officership or on the board of trustees are filled by the remaining trustees.
