= Fox Township, Carroll County, Ohio =

Township in Ohio, US

- Township
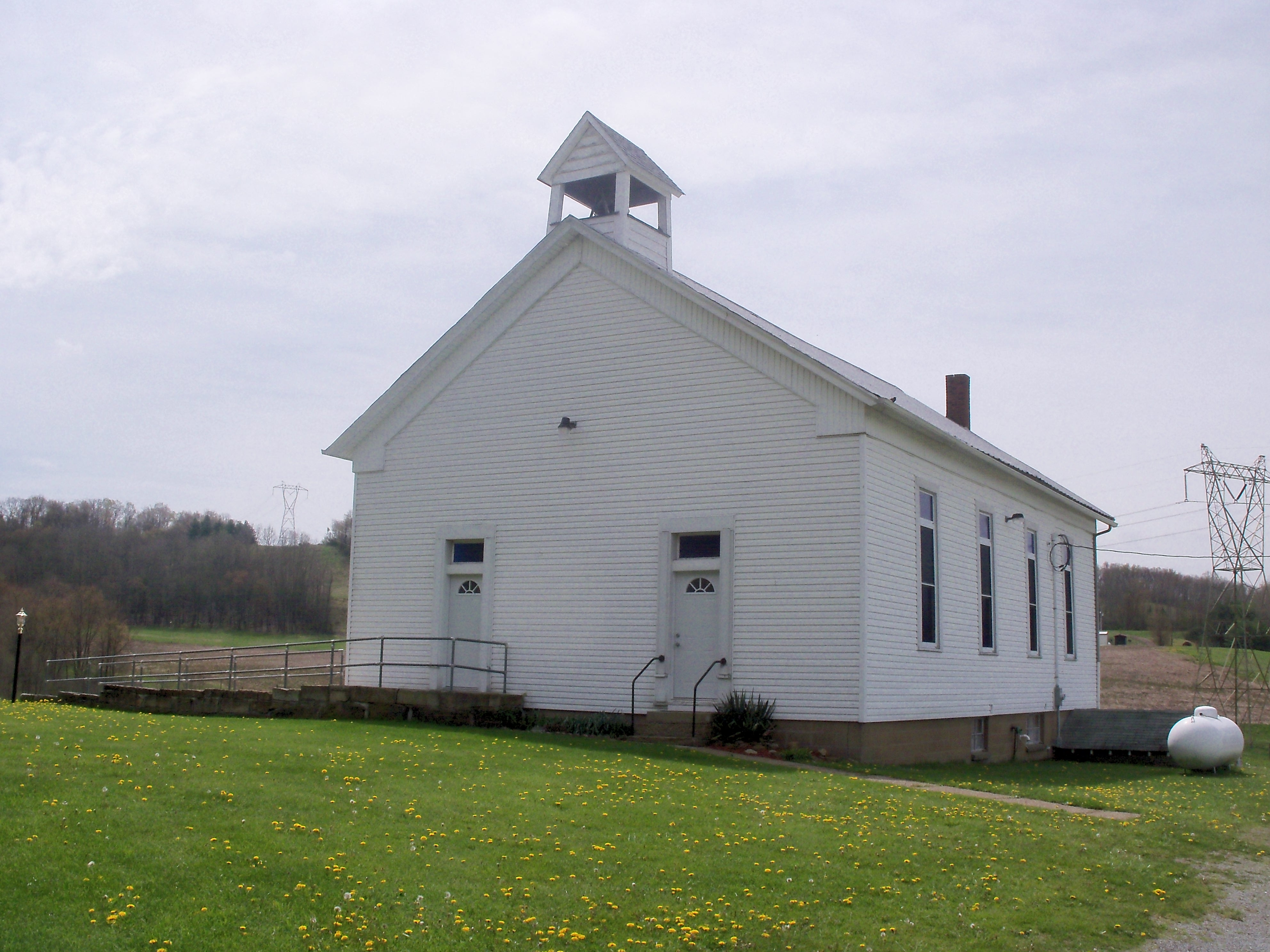
- Riley's Church (1876) on Route 39

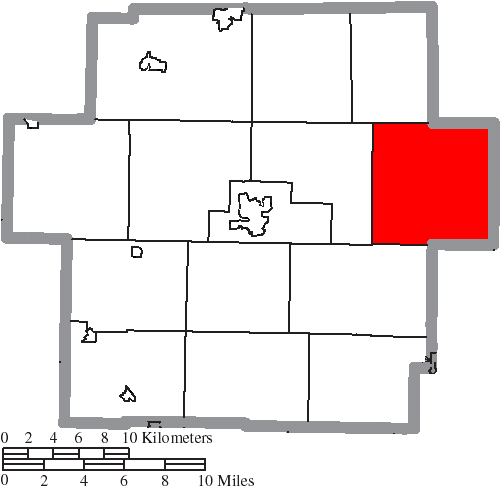
- Location of Fox Township in Carroll County
- Coordinates: 40°35′49″N 80°54′34″W
- Country: United States
- State: Ohio
- County: Carroll

Area
  - Total: 36.16 sq mi (93.65 km^{2})
  - Land: 36.15 sq mi (93.63 km^{2})
  - Water: 0.0077 sq mi (0.02 km^{2})
- Elevation: 1,263 ft (385 m)

Population (2010)
  - Total: 977
  - Density: 27/sq mi (10.4/km^{2})
- Time zone: UTC-5 (Eastern (EST))
  - Summer (DST): UTC-4 (EDT)
- FIPS code: 39-28126
- GNIS feature ID: 1085828

Fox Township is one of the fourteen townships of Carroll County, Ohio, United States. As of the 2020 census, the population was 977.

== Geography ==
Located in the eastern part of the county, it borders the following townships:

- Franklin Township, Columbiana County - northeast
- Washington Township, Columbiana County - east
- Brush Creek Township, Jefferson County - southeast
- Springfield Township, Jefferson County - south
- Lee Township - southwest
- Washington Township - west
- East Township - northwest

No municipalities are located in Fox Township, although the unincorporated community of Mechanicstown lies in the township's northwest

== Name and history ==
It is the only Fox Township statewide. Fox Township, which is all of township 13, range 4 of the Old Seven Ranges, was taken from Columbiana County by the Ohio legislature in 1832–33.

On July 26, 1863 Major General John H. Morgan, C.S.A. of Morgan's Raiders and General James Shackleford U.S.A. fought the northernmost engagement of the American Civil War near Mechanicstown in this township.

== Government ==
Historical population
Census	Pop.	Note	%±
1820	264		—
1830	919		248.1%
1840	1,491		62.2%
1850	1,452		−2.6%
1860	1,126		−22.5%
1870	1,119		−0.6%
1880	1,275		13.9%
1890	1,210		−5.1%
1900	1,149		−5.0%
1910	1,098		−4.4%
1920	963		−12.3%
1930	790		−18.0%
1940	916		15.9%
1950	874		−4.6%
1960	897		2.6%
1970	889		−0.9%
1980	994		11.8%
1990	1,033		3.9%
2000	1,075		4.1%
2010	1,041		−3.2%
2020	977		−6.1%

The township is governed by a three-member board of trustees, who are elected in November of odd-numbered years to a four-year term beginning on the following January 1. Two are elected in the year after the presidential election and one is elected in the year before it. There is also an elected township fiscal officer, who serves a four-year term beginning on April 1 of the year after the election, which is held in November of the year before the presidential election. Vacancies in the fiscal officership or on the board of trustees are filled by the remaining trustees.

== Education ==
Students attend the Carrollton Exempted Village School District in most of the township and Edison Local School District in the southeast corner.

== Notable natives and residents ==
- Benjamin F. Potts, territorial governor of Montana
