= Lee Township, Carroll County, Ohio =

Township in Ohio, US

- Township
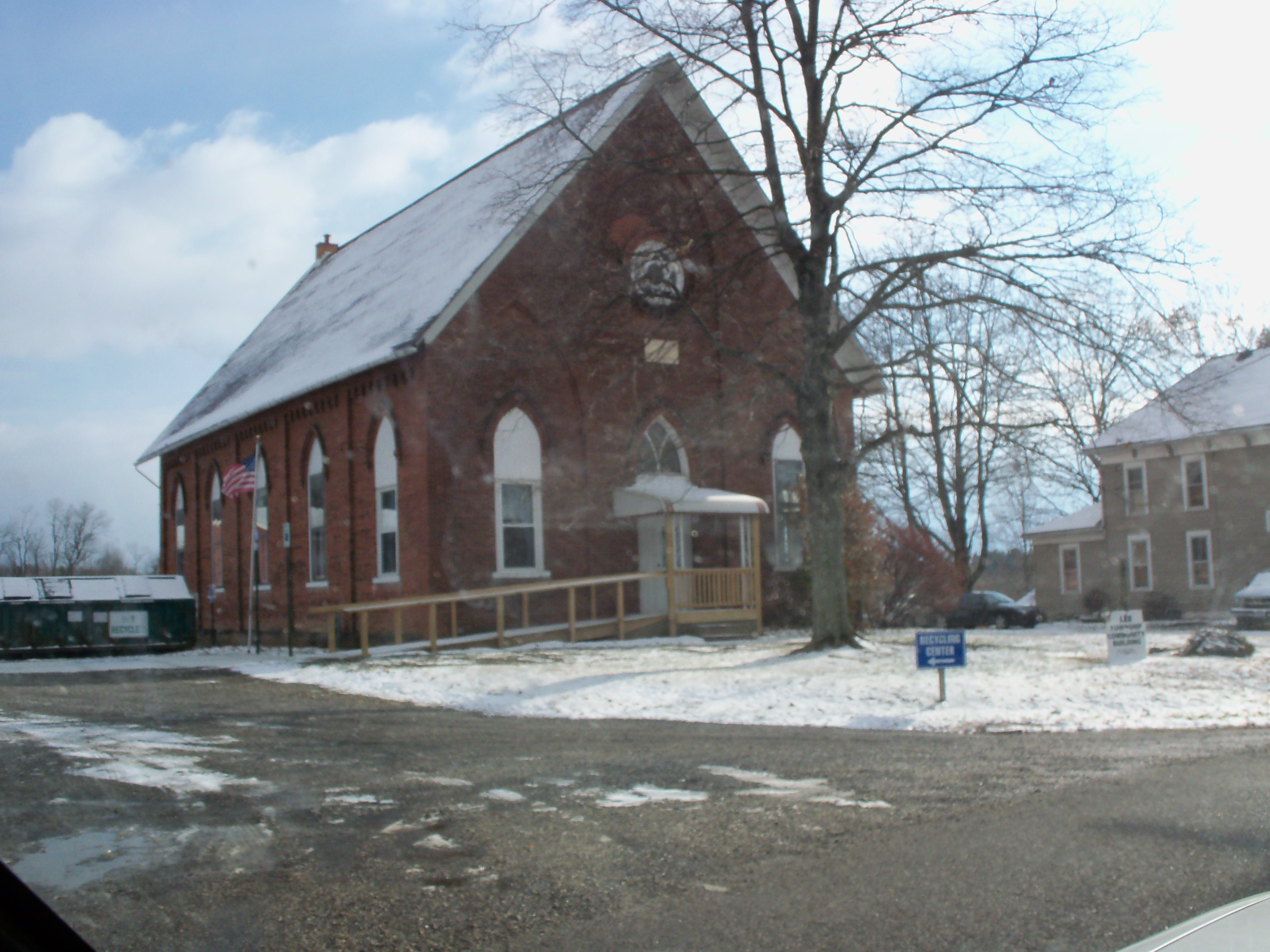
- The community building

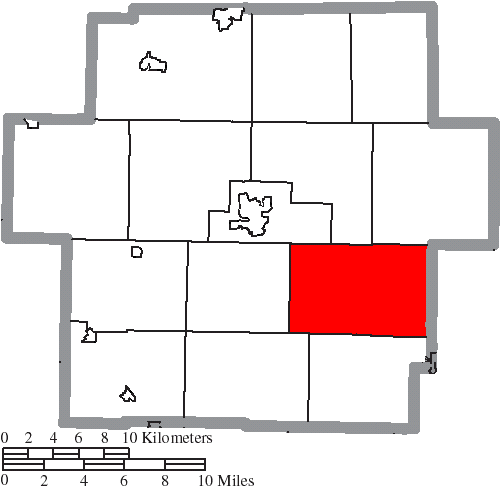
- Location of Lee Township in Carroll County
- Coordinates: 40°31′16″N 80°58′45″W
- Country: United States
- State: Ohio
- County: Carroll

Area
  - Total: 31.6 sq mi (81.9 km^{2})
  - Land: 31.6 sq mi (81.9 km^{2})
  - Water: 0 sq mi (0.0 km^{2})
- Elevation: 1,227 ft (374 m)

Population (2020)
  - Total: 1,022
  - Density: 32/sq mi (12.5/km^{2})
- Time zone: UTC-5 (Eastern (EST))
  - Summer (DST): UTC-4 (EDT)
- FIPS code: 39-42434
- GNIS feature ID: 1085830

Lee Township is one of the fourteen townships of Carroll County, Ohio, United States. As of the 2020 census, the population was 1,022.

== Geography ==
Located in the southeastern part of the county, it borders the following townships:

- Washington Township - north
- Fox Township - northeast
- Springfield Township, Jefferson County - east
- Loudon Township - south
- Perry Township - southwest
- Union Township - west
- Center Township - northwest

No municipalities are located in Lee Township, although the unincorporated community of Harlem Springs lies in the township's center

== Name and history ==
Statewide, other Lee Townships are located in Athens and Monroe counties.

At the March, 1836, meeting of the county commissioners the entry made was: "After reading and considering the petition for the erection and alteration of several townships in different parts of the county the following is moved", "A township named Lee was ordered to be erected from parts of the townships of Rock and Jefferson."

== Government ==
Historical population
Census	Pop.	Note	%±
1840	1,372		—
1850	1,220		−11.1%
1860	1,225		0.4%
1870	901		−26.4%
1880	933		3.6%
1890	926		−0.8%
1900	849		−8.3%
1910	828		−2.5%
1920	757		−8.6%
1930	695		−8.2%
1940	858		23.5%
1950	964		12.4%
1960	989		2.6%
1970	999		1.0%
1980	1,000		0.1%
1990	1,046		4.6%
2000	1,128		7.8%
2010	1,087		−3.6%
2020	1,022		−6.0%

The township is governed by a three-member board of trustees, who are elected in November of odd-numbered years to a four-year term beginning on the following January 1. Two are elected in the year after the presidential election and one is elected in the year before it. There is also an elected township fiscal officer, who serves a four-year term beginning on April 1 of the year after the election, which is held in November of the year before the presidential election. Vacancies in the fiscal officership or on the board of trustees are filled by the remaining trustees.

== Education ==
Students attend the Carrollton Exempted Village School District.
