= Carrollton Exempted Village School District =

School district in Ohio

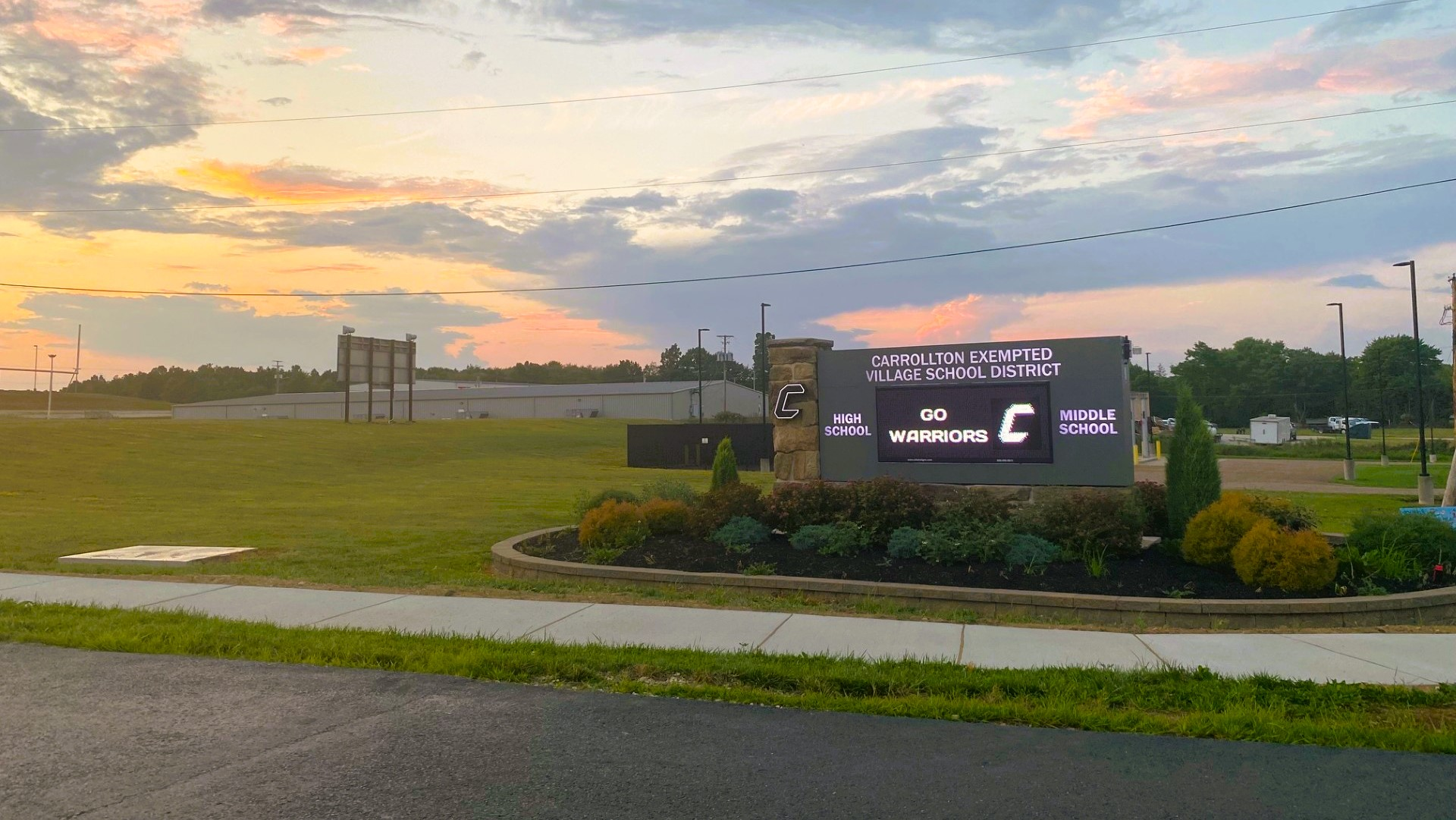
Carrollton Exempted Village School District

Carrollton Exempted Village Schools is a school district located in Carroll County, Ohio, United States. Carrollton High School, the only high school for the district, is located in Carrollton.

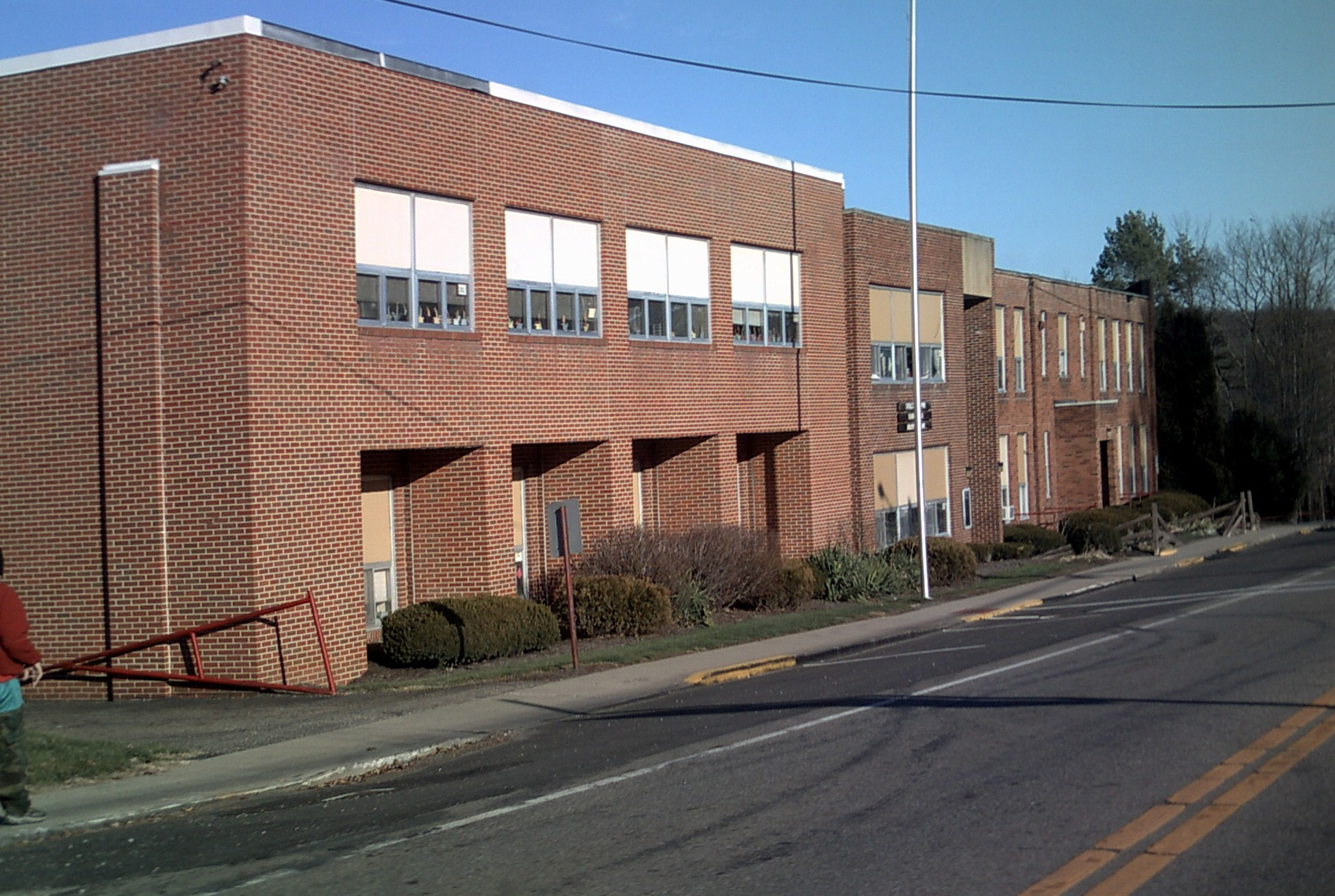
Dellroy Elementary which has been demolished.

== Schools ==
- Carrollton Elementary, Carrollton, Ohio
- Carrollton High School, Carrollton, Ohio

== Former schools ==
- Bell-Herron Middle School (closed in 2019, demolished)
- Augusta Elementary, Augusta (closed in 2019, demolished)
- Dellroy Elementary, Dellroy (closed in 2019, demolished)
- Harlem Springs Elementary, Harlem Springs (closed in 2008)
- Kilgore Elementary, Kilgore (built in 1891, joined the school district in 1959, closed in 2006, sold in 2008)
- Willis Elementary, Mechanicstown (closed in 2008)

== Current Elementary ==
What is currently the Elementary, until the new building is finished, is the combination of the 1913 building and the 1950s old high school. These buildings serve grades k-5 and preschool.

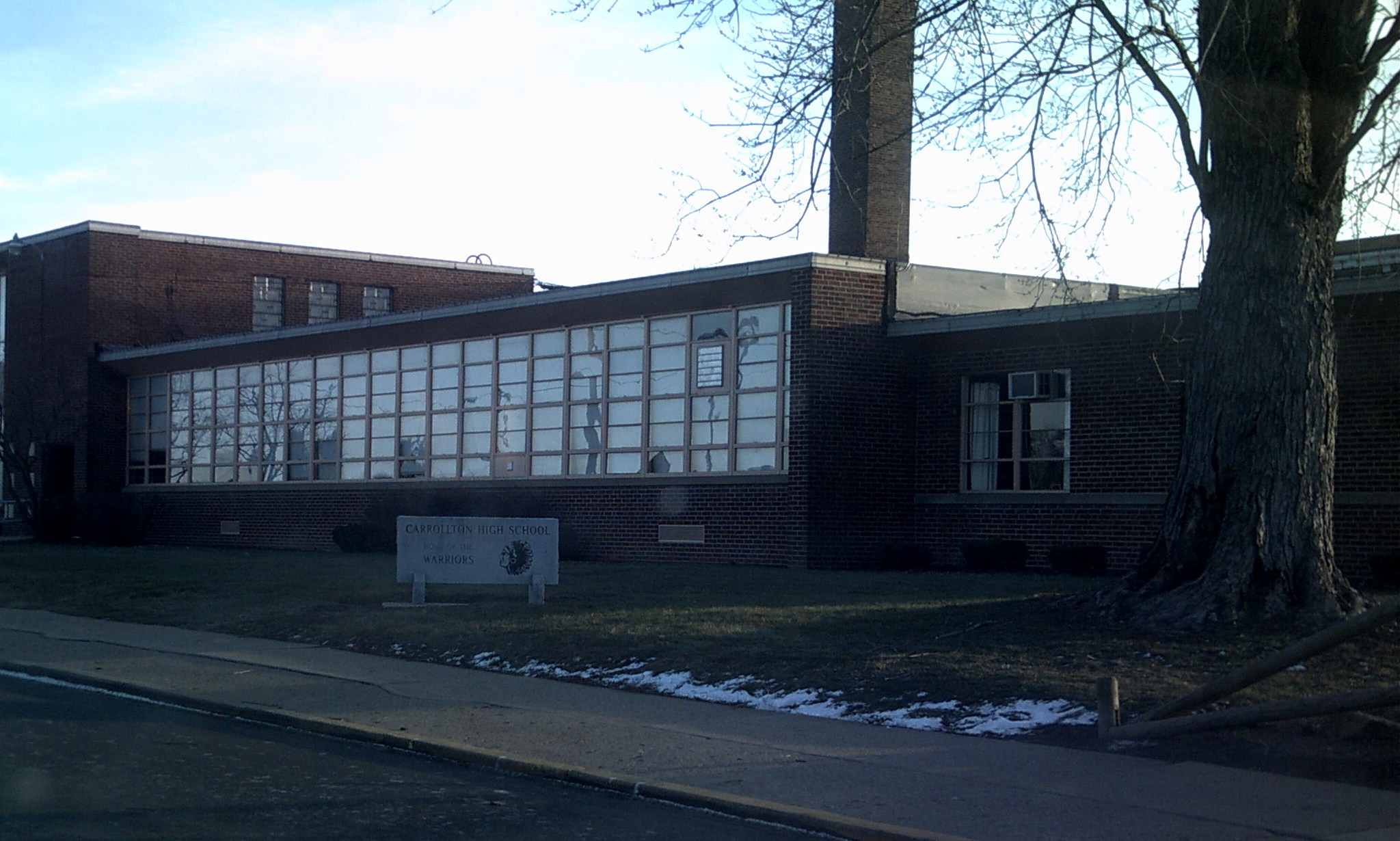
1950s High School now used as part of the Elementary.

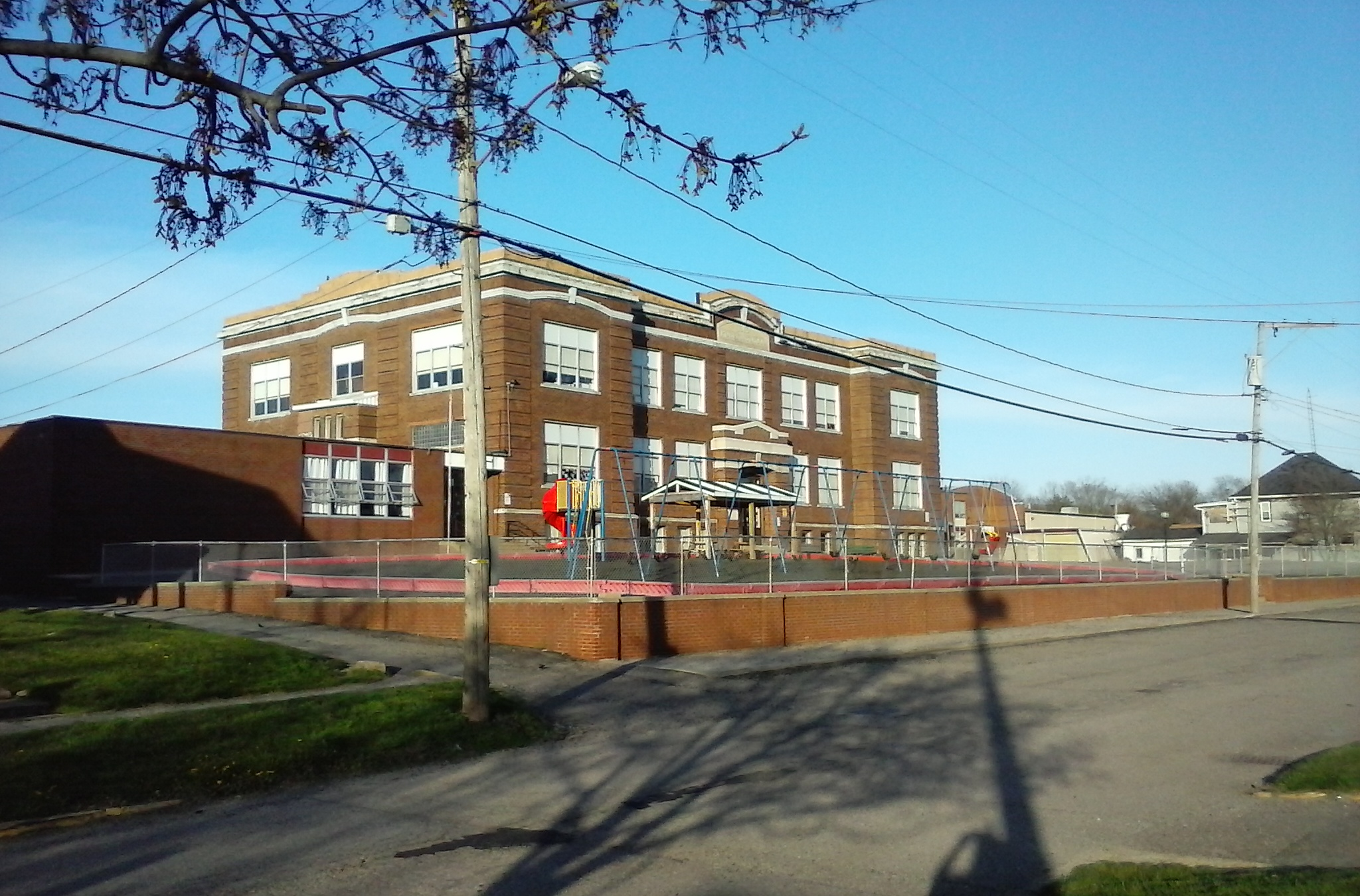
1930 Building which is used as part of the Elementary.

== Current High School & Middle School ==
Carrollton Exempted Village School District began construction of the new grades 6-12 school building with a groundbreaking ceremony on May 18, 2017. Shook Touchstone Construction headed the construction as part of the Ohio Facilities Construction Commission. The building is at 205 Scio Road, Carrollton, OH 44615. The building opened to students on August 20, 2019. Construction for the new elementary school, which will be part of the existing building, is currently underway.

== See also ==
- List of school districts in Ohio
