= Lake Mohawk (Ohio) =

Lake Mohawk, Ohio

- Location within Ohio Location within the United States
- Location: Brown Township, Carroll County, Ohio; Harrison Township, Carroll County, Ohio
- Coordinates: 40°40′26″N 81°11′29″W
- Type: reservoir
- Primary inflows: Middle Run
- Primary outflows: Middle Run
- Basin countries: United States
- Surface area: 507 acres (2.05 km^{2})
- Max. depth: 23 ft (7.0 m)
- Surface elevation: 1,020 ft (310 m)

Lake Mohawk is a private reservoir located about 1.5 mi (2.4 km) south of Malvern, Ohio, USA and 2.5 mi (4.0 km) east of Waynesburg, Ohio. It resides in Brown Township and Harrison Township. The lake is relatively small, being a private lake containing 0.7922 sq mi (2.052 km^{2}) of water with a maximum depth of 23 ft (7.0 m). There is only one place to put in boats, however, there are 13 community access docks that can hold boats. The lake is formed by Lake Mohawk Dam across Middle Run, a tributary of Sandy Creek. The lake is fed by a series of springs and rainwater runoff. There is also a short 9 hole golf course located around the dam of the lake

== Flora ==
The flora contained in the lake mostly amounts to Spirogyra and Curly-leaf Pondweed. Also, in fall and winter months, it may contain Scenedesmus and Microcystis. The weed coverage is Leafy Pondweed, Naiad, Eurasian Watermilfoil, and Sago Pondweed.

== Fauna ==
Some types of fish that reside in the lake are Largemouth and Smallmouth bass, Crappie, Yellow perch, Bluegill, Walleye, sunfish, and 2 varieties of catfish, Mud Catfish and Blue catfish. There is also a no-release policy on Alaskan Pike.

== Lake community ==
The community was established in 1963 by the American Realty Service Corporation on 1,728 acres (6.99 km^{2}) of property. The lake is inside a gated community which contains approximately 1,700 property lots that are privately owned. There are 3 beaches: Main Beach, West Beach and South Beach. The Main Beach has tennis courts nearby. The Main Beach also hosts a large pavilion and clubhouse that can be rented out, along with 3 smaller pavilions on the beach. The Main Beach has a large play area with swings and a jungle-gym. There is a designated swimming area along the shoreline of the beach. The Main Beach also holds the private ski club dock that is used by the Lake Mohawk Water Ski Club. Near the main gate entrance is the golf course which is a 9-hole, par 3 course. There is a small green fee to play. The 2010 census found 1,652 people in 669 occupied dwellings, with 315 vacant dwellings.

== Surrounding communities ==
Outside of the Main Gate, but still part of lake property, is a recreational park that contains a baseball field, basketball court, shuffleboard courts, and biking trail. In addition to the Main Gate, there are also 2 other gates: Keno Road Gate and Lace Road Gate, that are only accessible with a key card. A guard house allows visitors in; thus, contractors and shipping trucks may enter through the Main Gate only. Most children and teenagers go to Brown Local School District that contains one high school, one middle school and one elementary school.
