= Lake Mohawk, Ohio =

- Census-designated place
- Location within Ohio
- Coordinates: 40°39′39″N 81°11′34″W
- Country: United States
- State: Ohio
- County: Carroll
- Townships: Brown, Harrison

Area
  - Total: 4.47 sq mi (11.59 km^{2})
  - Land: 3.67 sq mi (9.50 km^{2})
  - Water: 0.80 sq mi (2.08 km^{2})
- Elevation: 1,116 ft (340 m)

Population (2020)
  - Total: 1,601
  - Density: 436.3/sq mi (168.44/km^{2})
- Time zone: UTC-5 (Eastern (EST))
  - Summer (DST): UTC-4 (EDT)
- FIPS code: 39-41443
- GNIS feature ID: 2628920
- Website: lake-mohawk.org

Lake Mohawk is a census-designated place (CDP) in Brown and Harrison townships in Carroll County, Ohio, United States, developed around Lake Mohawk, a reservoir. The population of the CDP was 1,601 as of the 2020 census.

== History ==
Lake Mohawk was founded in 1963 by property developers as a planned community.

== Geography ==
The Lake Mohawk community is situated on both sides of Lake Mohawk, a small reservoir on Middle Creek, a tributary of Sandy Creek, part of the Tuscarawas River watershed flowing to the Ohio River. The majority of the lake and community are in Brown Township, with the upstream end of the lake extending south into Harrison Township. The lake's outlet is 1.5 miles (2.4 km) south of the village of Malvern.

The community was established in 1963 by the American Realty Service Corporation on 1,728 acres (6.99 km^{2}) of property. The lake is inside a gated community which contains approximately 1,700 property lots that are privately owned.

According to the United States Census Bureau, the Lake Mohawk CDP has a total area of 4.5 square miles (11.6 km^{2}), of which 3.7 square miles (9.5 km^{2}) is land and 0.81 square miles (2.1 km^{2}), or 17.99%, is water.

== Demographics ==
Historical population
Census	Pop.	Note	%±
2020	1,601		—
U.S. Decennial Census
