= Albert R. Haines =

American politician (born 1826)

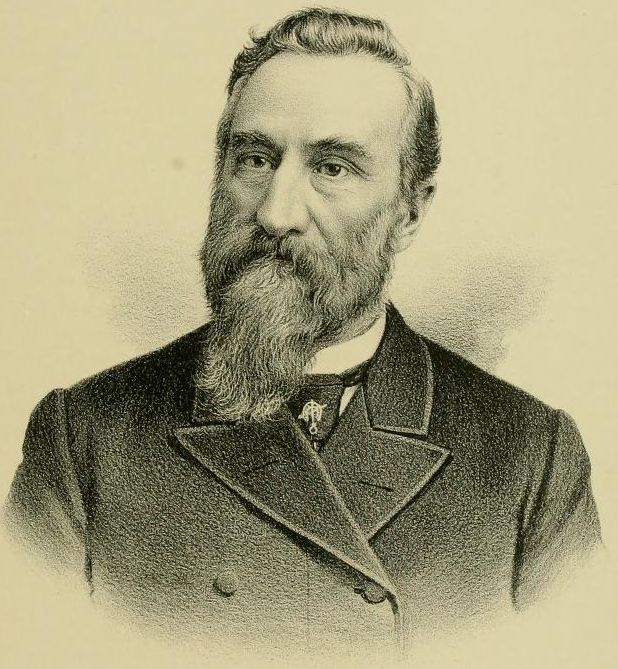
- Haines in a 1891 publication

Member of the Ohio Senate from the 21st district
- In office 1876–1878
- Preceded by: Edwin Ferrall
- Succeeded by: Johnson Sherrick

Personal details
- Born: September 15, 1826 Brown Township, Carroll County, Ohio, U.S.
- Party: Democratic
- Spouse: Almira Harsh (m. 1857)
- Children: 6
- Relatives: Thomas E. Haines (brother)
- Occupation: Politician; farmer; businessman

Albert R. Haines (born September 15, 1826) was an American politician from Ohio. He served as a member of the Ohio Senate from 1876 to 1878.

== Early life ==
Albert R. Haines was born on September 15, 1826, in Brown Township, Carroll County, Ohio, to Hannah (née Shriver) and Joseph Haines. Haines was descended from Jacob Haines, a Quaker who emigrated from England.

== Career ==
One of Haines's first jobs was as a teacher in Fairfield, Illinois. He then returned home and worked on his father's farm near Pekin and taught school in the area. He then clerked at Joseph Poole & Co., a store in Minerva and later at Morledge & Perdue. Haines then partnered with William and Jeremiah Unkefer in a general store. In 1855, he moved to Malvern and started a country general store there. The store was part of a joint stock company. He worked there for about fifteen years. He then worked his "Church Hill" farm in Sandy Valley between Malvern and Oneida Mills.

Haines was a Democrat. He ran for the Ohio Senate in 1867, but lost. In 1872, he was a presidential elector. He served in the Ohio Senate, representing the 21st district from 1876 to 1878. In 1877, he declined the Democratic nomination for the Ohio Senate. He was a delegate at the 1888 Democratic National Convention.

In 1888, Haines joined a business in Malvern manufacturing fire brick called the Malvern Clay Company. The clay and coal supplying the business came from his farm. He also owned several thousand acres of land in Arkansas.

== Personal life ==
Haines married Almira Harsh, daughter of Leonard Harsh, of Harrison Township in the fall of 1857. Her father was a justice of the peace and state representative. They had six children, Lula Hannah, Jettie Lilian, Minnie Albert, Carrie Elizabeth, Robert H. and Paul W. His daughter Minnie married the Cleveland manufacturer Isaac N. Pennock. His brother Thomas E. Haines represented Polk County, Iowa, in the Iowa state legislature. In 1889, Haines traveled through Europe.
