= Isaac H. Taylor =

American politician (1840–1936)

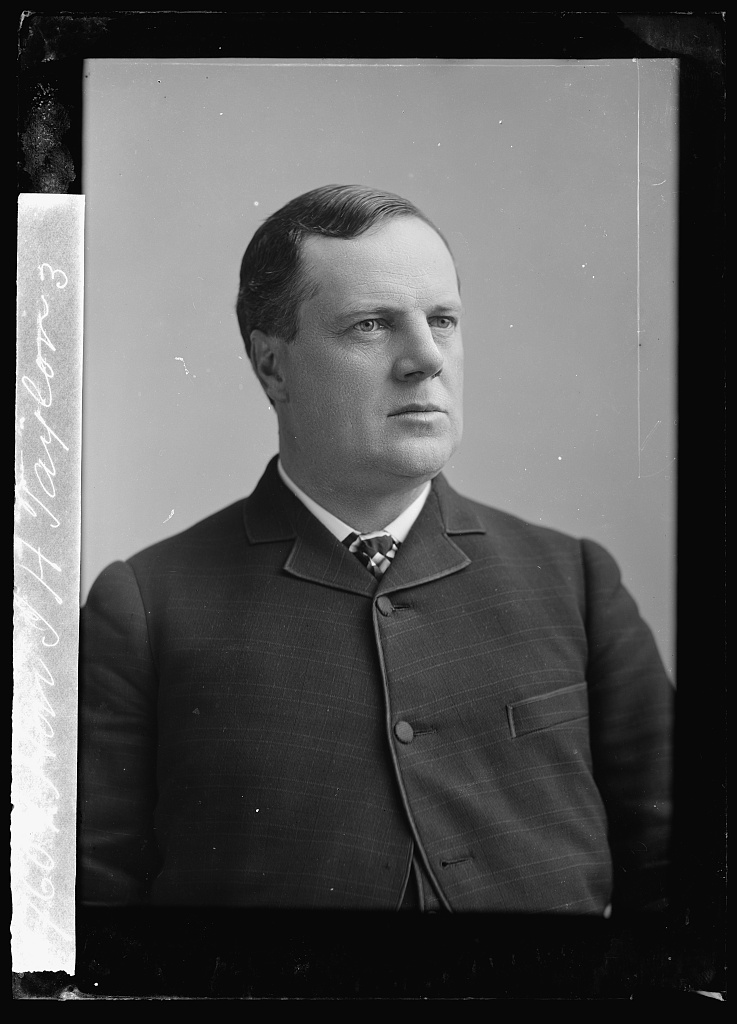

Member of the U.S. House of Representatives from Ohio's 18th district
- In office March 4, 1885 – March 3, 1887
- Preceded by: Jonathan H. Wallace
- Succeeded by: William McKinley

Personal details
- Born: Isaac Hamilton Taylor; April 18, 1840 New Harrisburg, Ohio, US
- Died: December 18, 1936 (aged 96) Congress Lake, Hartville, Ohio, US
- Resting place: West Lawn Cemetery
- Party: Republican
- Spouse: Sarah J. Elder
- Children: 3

Isaac Hamilton Taylor (April 18, 1840 – December 18, 1936) was a lawyer, judge, and single-term U.S. Representative from Ohio from 1885 to 1887.

== Biography ==
Taylor was born near New Harrisburg (later Hibbetts), Carroll County, Ohio. He was the son of James and Mary Ann (Highland) Taylor. Taylor attended the common schools and completed an academic course.

=== Early career ===
He then studied law and was admitted to the bar in 1867, subsequently commencing practice in Carrollton, Ohio. He served as the clerk of courts in Carroll County, Ohio from 1870 to 1877.

Taylor was married November 1, 1860 to Sarah J. Elder. They had three children.

=== Congress ===
Taylor was elected as a Republican to the Forty-ninth Congress (March 4, 1885 – March 3, 1887). He was not a candidate for renomination in 1886.

=== Later career ===
He then moved to Canton, Ohio, and resumed the practice of law. Taylor served as a delegate to the 1892 Republican National Convention. He was the judge of the Court of Common Pleas from 1889 to 1901, when he resigned. He engaged in the practice of his profession in Canton until 1922.

== Death and burial ==
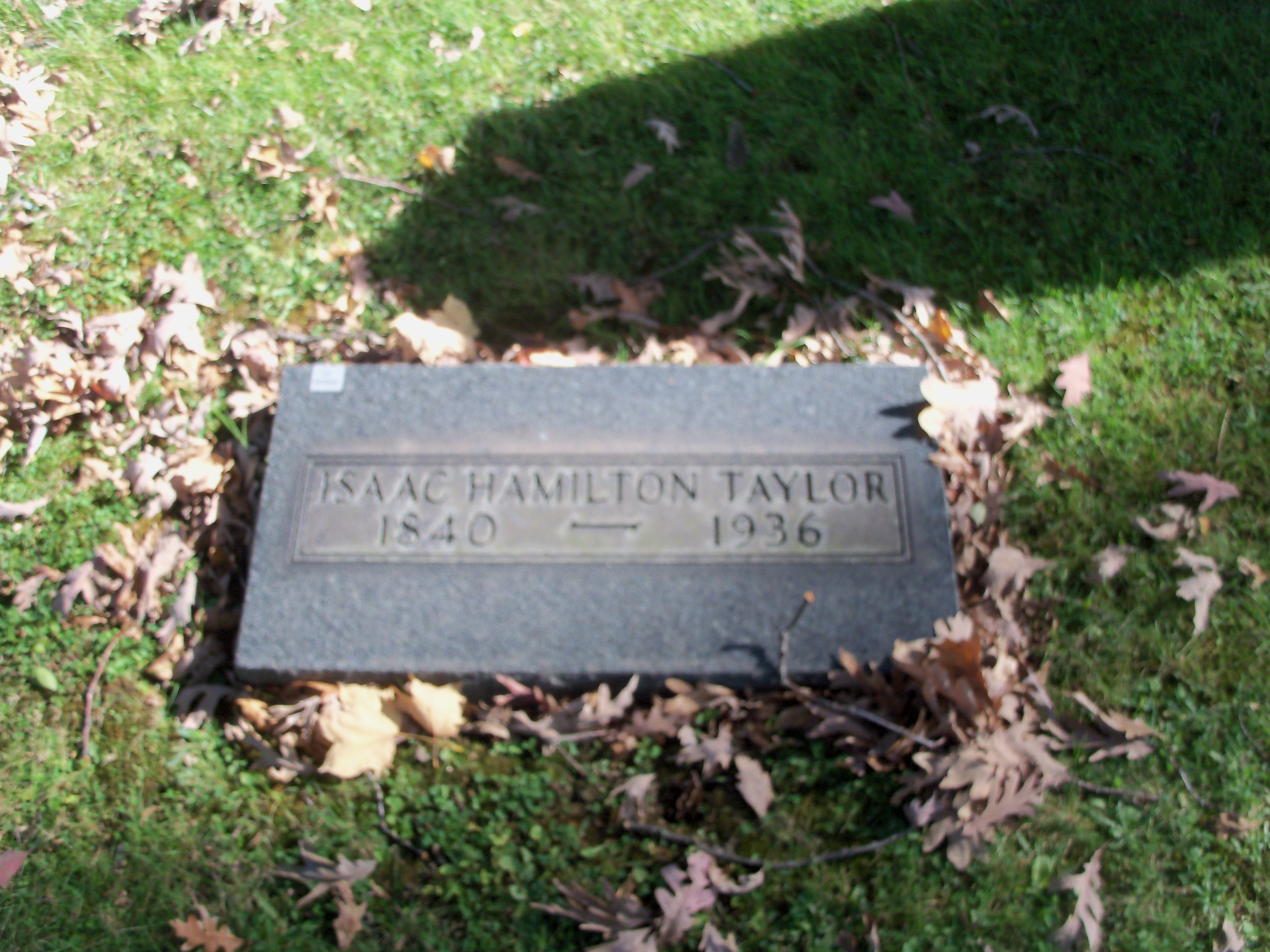
Grave of Taylor at West Lawn Cemetery

Taylor died at Congress Lake, near Hartville, Ohio, December 18, 1936, and was interred in West Lawn Cemetery in Canton.

U.S. House of Representatives
| Preceded by Jonathan H. Wallace | Member of the U.S. House of Representatives from Ohio's 18th congressional district 1885-1887 | Succeeded by William McKinley |
