= Ohio State Route 171 =

State highway in northeastern Ohio, US

State Route 171

Route information
- Maintained by ODOT
- Length: 11.76 mi (18.93 km)
- Existed: 1924–present

Major junctions
- West end: SR 183 in Waynesburg
- SR 43 near Carrollton
- East end: SR 9 / CR 71 near Carrollton

Location
- Country: United States
- State: Ohio
- Counties: Stark, Carroll

Highway system
- Ohio State Highway System; Interstate; US; State; Scenic
← SR 170	→ SR 172

State Route 171 (SR 171) is a west–east state highway located in northeastern Ohio. The highway's western terminus is at a signalized intersection with SR 183 in Waynesburg. The eastern terminus of SR 171 is at SR 9 approximately two miles (3.2 km) north of Carrollton.

== Route description ==
SR 171's routing takes it through the southeastern corner of Stark County and the northwestern portion of Carroll County. No part of SR 171 is included within the National Highway System.

== History ==
When it was originally designated in 1924, SR 171 ran from its current western terminus in Waynesburg through New Harrisburg to its junction with SR 43 northwest of Carrollton. In 1937, the highway was extended eastward to SR 9, then continuing east via Carroll County Road 71 (CR 71) to a new terminus at SR 39 just west of Mechanicstown. By 1967, SR 171 was truncated to its current eastern terminus at SR 9, with jurisdiction of the portion between SR 9 and SR 39 being transferred to Carroll County. This stretch of roadway was renamed CR 71.

== Major intersections ==
County	Location	mi	km	Destinations	Notes
Stark	Waynesburg	0.00	0.00	SR 183 (West Lisbon Street / Main Street)	
Carroll	Harrison Township	9.82	15.80	SR 43 (Canton Road) – Carrollton, Steubenville, Malvern	
Carroll	Washington Township	11.76	18.93	SR 9 (Kensington Road) / CR 71 (Cobbler Road) – Kensington, Carrollton	
1.000 mi = 1.609 km; 1.000 km = 0.621 mi
