= Thomas E. Haines =

American politician (1831–1908)

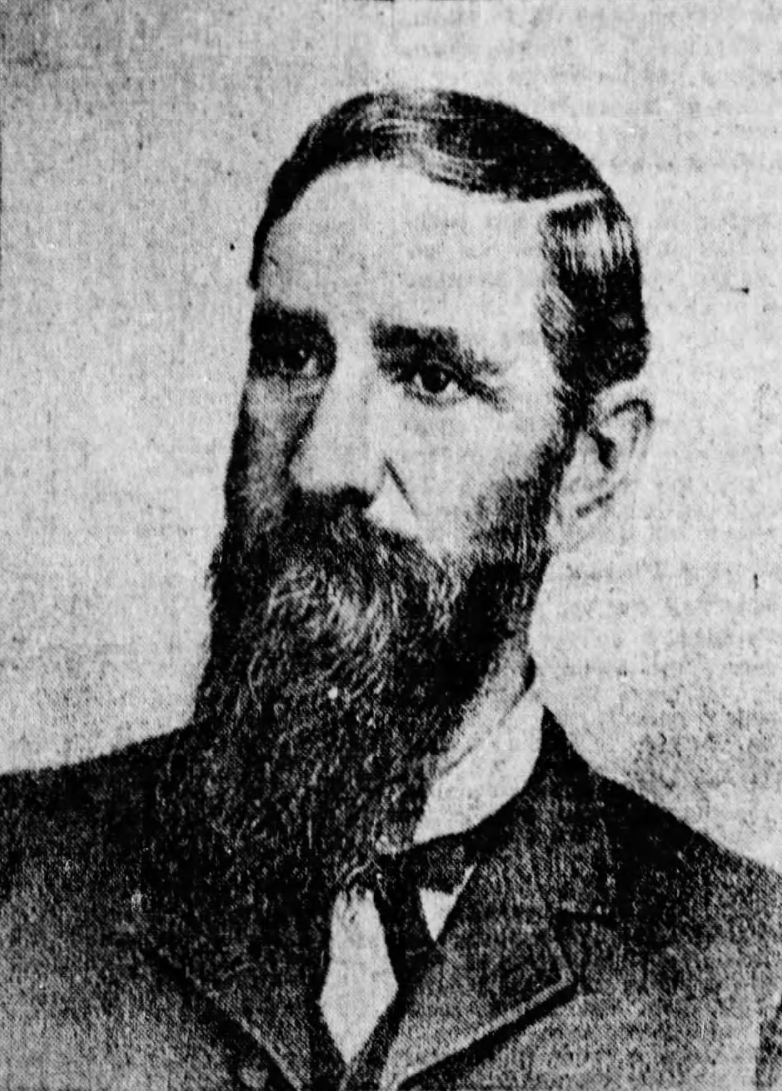
- Haines in a 1910 newspaper

Member of the Iowa House of Representatives from the Polk County district
- In office 1882–1883 Serving with Thomas W. Havens
- Preceded by: Josiah A. Harvey and James C. Jordan
- Succeeded by: James M. Tuttle and Charles L. Watrous

Personal details
- Born: January 21, 1831 near Pekin, Carroll County, Ohio, U.S.
- Died: May 9, 1908 (aged 77)
- Party: Republican
- Spouse: Loretta J. Berridge (m. 1869)
- Relatives: Albert R. Haines (brother)
- Occupation: Politician; businessman; farmer

Thomas E. Haines (January 21, 1831 – May 9, 1908) was an American politician from Iowa. He served as a member of the Iowa House of Representatives, representing Polk County from 1882 to 1883.

== Early life ==
Thomas E. Haines was born on January 21, 1831, near Pekin, Carroll County, Ohio, to Hannah (née Shrivers) and Joseph Haines. His father was a farmer. He remained on the farm until June 1863.

== Career ==
In June 1863, Haines moved to Iowa with a flock of sheep. He worked with sheep in Mahaska and Keokuk counties until the fall of 1867 with Reuben Redman. He then worked in mercantile business in Oskaloosa. In March 1869, he moved to Altoona in Polk County. He then worked in the grain business. In 1883, Haines started manufacturing brick and in 1884, he started manufacturing tile. He built a factory. In 1869, he organized a Union Sabbath School and was its superintendent of several years.

Haines was a Republican. He served as a member of the Iowa House of Representatives, representing Polk County from 1882 to 1883. He was a member of the Pioneer Law Maker's Association and served as its chairman from 1896 to 1898.

Haines served as town treasurer for six years. He was a member of the school board. He was a trustee of Drake University of Des Moines.

== Personal life ==
Haines married Loretta J. Berridge, daughter of William Berridge, of New London, Ohio, in August 1869. They had no children, but adopted children, including Minnie, Nellie and Guy. His brother was Ohio state senator Albert R. Haines. He was an elder in the Christian Church of Altoona.

Haines died on May 9, 1908.

== Legacy ==
In 1888, Haines donated ten acres of land in Polk County for use as parks and streets.
