= James Tuttle =

James Tuttle may refer to:

- James M. Tuttle (1823–1892), American Civil War general, businessman, and politician from Iowa
- James Tuttle (rugby union) (born 1996), Australian rugby union player
