= Joseph J. Cicchetti =

US Army Medal of Honor recipient (1923–1945)

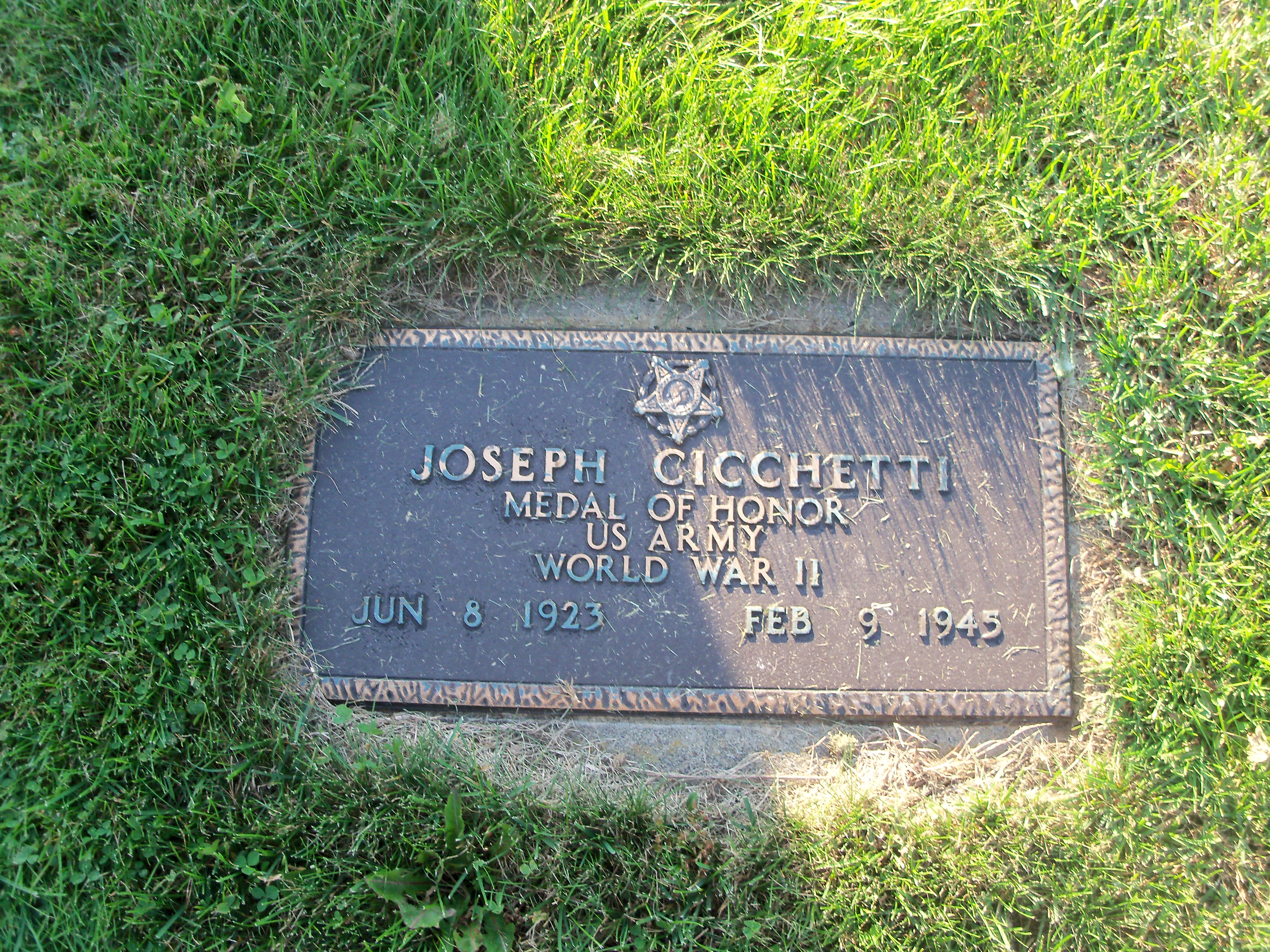
- Joseph J. Cicchetti grave marker
- Born: June 8, 1923; Waynesburg, Ohio, US
- Died: February 9, 1945 (aged 21); Manila, Philippines
- Burial place: Sandy Valley, Waynesburg, Ohio
- Military career
- Allegiance: United States
- Branch: United States Army
- Service years: 1943–1945
- Rank: Private First Class
- Units: Company A, 148th Infantry, 37th Infantry Division
- Conflicts: World War II †
- Awards: Medal of Honor

Joseph J. Cicchetti (June 8, 1923 – February 9, 1945) was a soldier in the United States Army who received the Medal of Honor in World War II during actions in the campaign to recapture the Philippines from Japanese forces in 1945. Cicchetti formed a team of soldiers to rescue wounded comrades. Despite receiving a severe wound to his head, he managed to carry another soldier to safety before succumbing to his wound.

Cicchetti joined the Army from his birth city in March 1943. He is buried in Sandy Valley, Waynesburg, Ohio (Stark County).

== Medal of Honor citation ==
- Cicchetti, Joseph J.
- Rank and organization:Private First Class, U.S. Army, Company A, 148th Infantry, 37th Infantry Division
- Place and date:South Manila, Luzon, Philippine Islands, February 9, 1945
- Entered service at:Waynesburg, Ohio
- Citation:

He was with troops assaulting the first important line of enemy defenses. The Japanese had converted the partially destroyed Manila Gas Works and adjacent buildings into a formidable system of mutually supporting strongpoints from which they were concentrating machinegun, mortar, and heavy artillery fire on the American forces. Casualties rapidly mounted, and the medical aid men, finding it increasingly difficult to evacuate the wounded, called for volunteer litter bearers. Pfc. Cicchetti immediately responded, organized a litter team and skillfully led it for more than 4 hours in rescuing 14 wounded men, constantly passing back and forth over a 400-yard route which was the impact area for a tremendous volume of the most intense enemy fire. On one return trip the path was blocked by machinegun fire, but Pfc. Cicchetti deliberately exposed himself to draw the automatic fire which he neutralized with his own rifle while ordering the rest of the team to rush past to safety with the wounded. While gallantly continuing his work, he noticed a group of wounded and helpless soldiers some distance away and ran to their rescue although the enemy fire had increased to new fury. As he approached the casualties, he was struck in the head by a shell fragment, but with complete disregard for his gaping wound he continued to his comrades, lifted one and carried him on his shoulders 50 yards to safety. He then collapsed and died. By his skilled leadership, indomitable will, and dauntless courage, Pfc. Cicchetti saved the lives of many of his fellow soldiers at the cost of his own.

== See also ==
- List of Medal of Honor recipients for World War II
