= Scroggsfield, Ohio =

Unincorporated community in Ohio, U.S.

Coordinates: 40°34′40″N 80°57′39″W

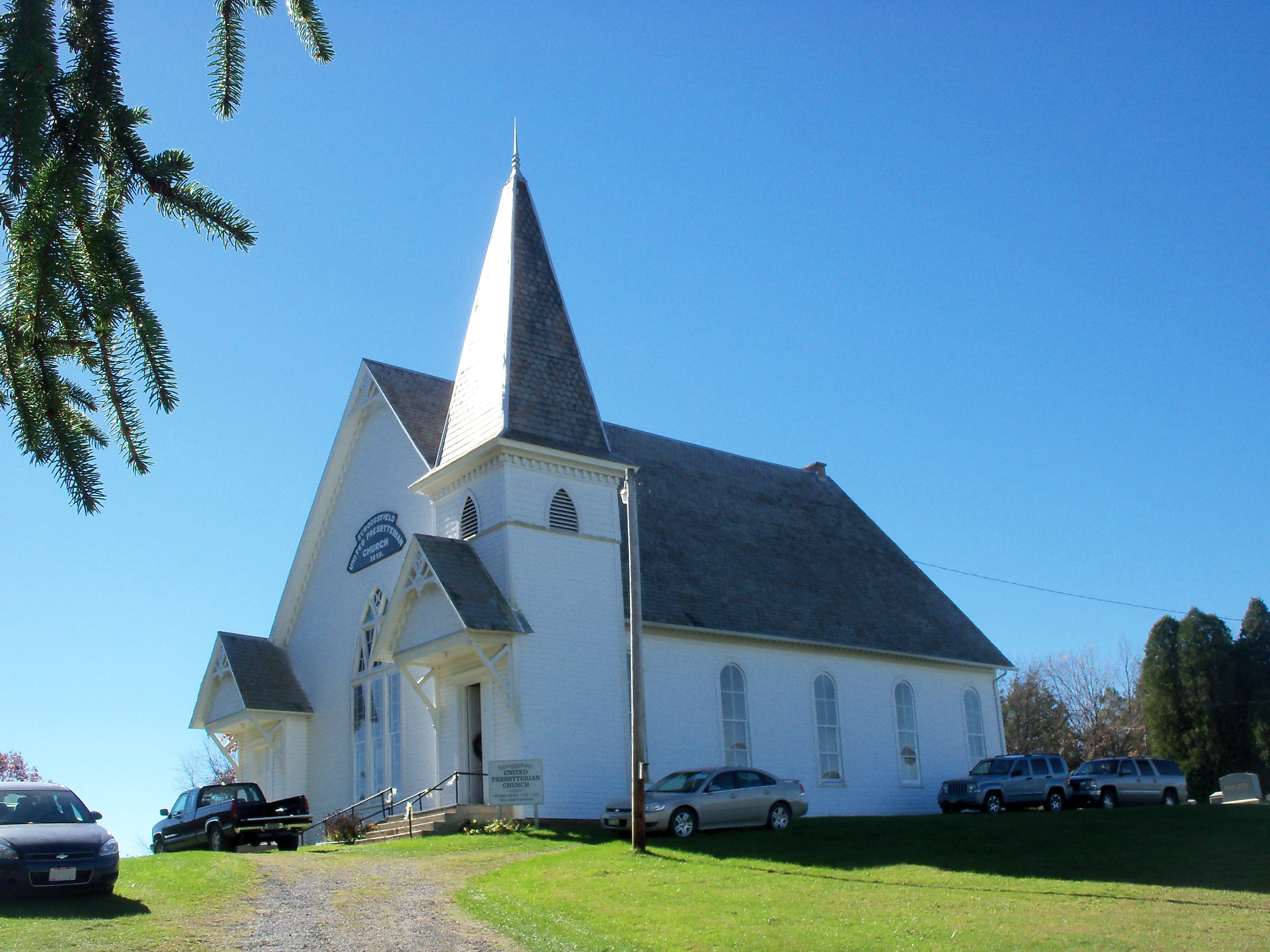
An early 19th-century church

Scroggsfield is an unincorporated community in Fox Township, Carroll County, Ohio, United States. The community is part of the Canton–Massillon Metropolitan Statistical Area. The community is served by the Carrollton, Ohio post office, ZIP code 44615. It is located near the source of Strawcamp Run, a tributary to Yellow Creek.

== History ==
Scroggsfield was named from the open-air preaching (i.e. in a field) of the Rev. E.N. Scroggs.

An 1831 reference had this to say of Fox Township: "Fox, the name of a post township in the southern border of Columbiana County, about 15 miles southeast of New Lisbon, and 130 northeast of Columbus. The office is ridiculously called Scroggsfield." Fox Township was taken from Columbiana County to form Carroll County.

== Education ==
Students attend the Carrollton Exempted Village School District.
