= Brown Township, Carroll County, Ohio =

Township in Ohio, US

- Township
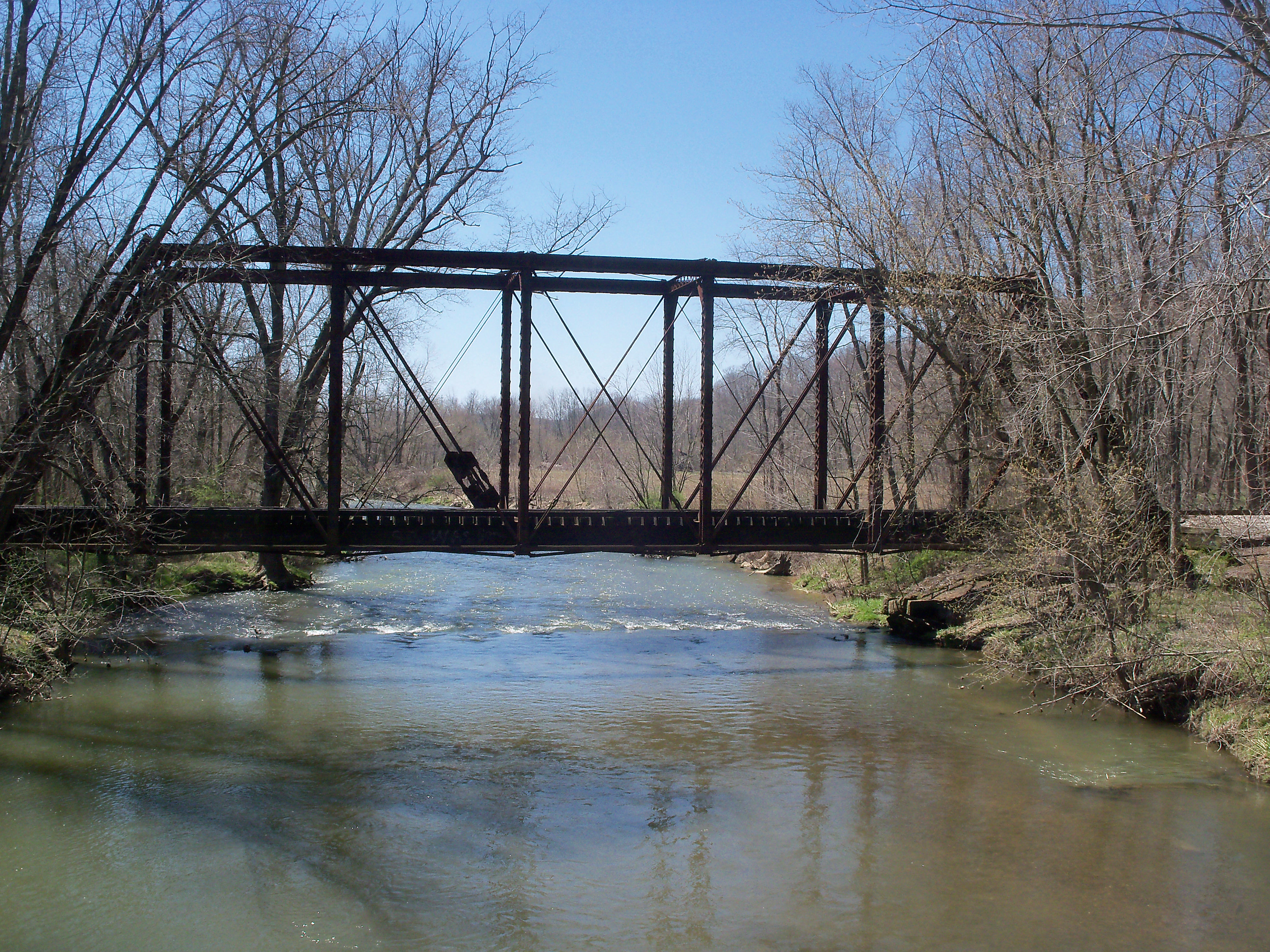
- W&LE rail bridge over Sandy Creek in Oneida

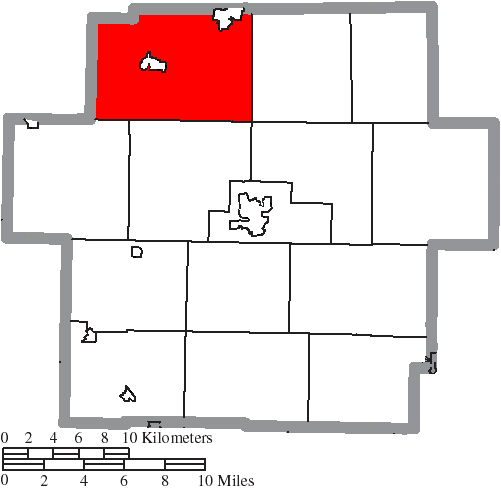
- Location of Brown Township in Carroll County
- Coordinates: 40°41′47″N 81°9′12″W
- Country: United States
- State: Ohio
- County: Carroll

Area
  - Total: 42.8 sq mi (110.9 km^{2})
  - Land: 42.0 sq mi (108.8 km^{2})
  - Water: 0.81 sq mi (2.1 km^{2})
- Elevation: 1,004 ft (306 m)

Population (2020)
  - Total: 7,214
  - Density: 172/sq mi (66.3/km^{2})
- Time zone: UTC-5 (Eastern (EST))
  - Summer (DST): UTC-4 (EDT)
- FIPS code: 39-09400
- GNIS feature ID: 1085825
- Website: browntwpcarrollco.org

Brown Township is one of the fourteen townships of Carroll County, Ohio, United States. As of the 2020 census the township had a population of 7,214.

== Geography ==
Located in the northwestern corner of the county, it borders the following townships:

- Paris Township, Stark County - north
- West Township, Columbiana County - northeast corner
- Augusta Township - east
- Washington Township - southeast corner
- Harrison Township - south
- Rose Township - southwest
- Sandy Township, Stark County - west
- Osnaburg Township, Stark County - northwest

Two incorporated villages are located in Brown Township: Malvern in the center, and part of Minerva in the northeast. The unincorporated community of Lake Mohawk, a census-designated place, is in the southwest part of the township, and Pekin, another unincorporated community and census-designated place, is in the northeast part, next to Minerva.

Ohio State Route 43 passes through the township, leading west then north from Malvern 16 miles (26 km) to the center of Canton and southeast 10 miles (16 km) to Carrollton, the county seat. Ohio State Route 183 leads northeast from OH 43 4 miles (6 km) to Minerva.

Malvern, Pekin, and Minerva are in the valley of Sandy Creek, a west-flowing tributary of the Tuscarawas River, part of the Ohio River watershed.

== Name and history ==
It is one of eight Brown Townships statewide.

This township was named for John Brown, who then resided at Pekin, and who built the first mill in that part of Carroll County. Brown Township was made an independent township in 1815 while a part of Stark County. With the formation of Carroll County in 1833, two miles off the east side of Sandy Township were annexed to the west side of Brown Township, creating an eight mile wide township.

== Government ==
Historical population
Census	Pop.	Note	%±
1820	365		—
1830	906		148.2%
1840	2,165		139.0%
1850	2,099		−3.0%
1860	2,022		−3.7%
1870	2,022		0.0%
1880	2,305		14.0%
1890	2,665		15.6%
1900	2,599		−2.5%
1910	2,655		2.2%
1920	3,629		36.7%
1930	4,141		14.1%
1940	4,301		3.9%
1950	4,974		15.6%
1960	5,267		5.9%
1970	5,662		7.5%
1980	7,568		33.7%
1990	7,958		5.2%
2000	8,300		4.3%
2010	7,935		−4.4%
2020	7,214		−9.1%

The township is governed by a three-member board of trustees, who are elected in November of odd-numbered years to a four-year term beginning on the following January 1. Two are elected in the year after the presidential election and one is elected in the year before it. There is also an elected township fiscal officer, who serves a four-year term beginning on April 1 of the year after the election, which is held in November of the year before the presidential election. Vacancies in the fiscal officership or on the board of trustees are filled by the remaining trustees.

== Education ==
Students attend the Minerva Local School District in the eastern part and Brown Local School District in the center and west part.

== Notable people ==
- Albert R. Haines (born 1826), member of the Ohio Senate
