= Jonathan Weaver (bishop) =

American bishop (1824–1901)

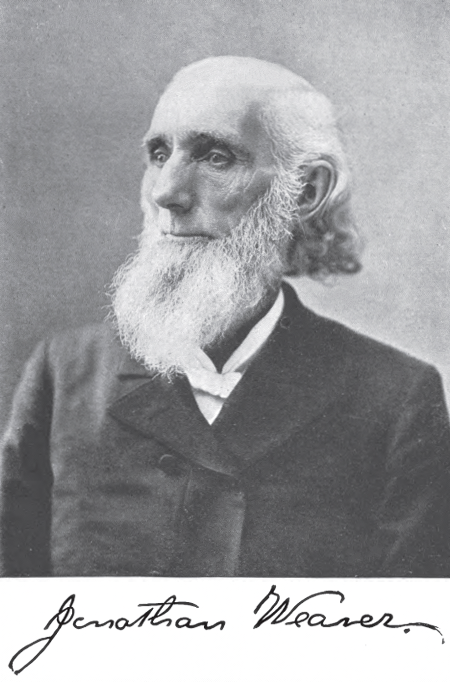
- Born: February 23, 1824; Carroll County, Ohio
- Died: February 6, 1901 (aged 76); Dayton, Ohio
- Resting place: Woodland Cemetery and Arboretum

Jonathan Weaver (February 23, 1824 – February 6, 1901) was a 19th-century bishop of the Church of the United Brethren in Christ, and employed by Otterbein College.

== Early life ==
Weaver was born in Harrison Township, Carroll County, Ohio on February 23, 1824. He was the youngest of twelve children, grew up on a farm, and attended public schools. He converted at a camp meeting in 1841, when he was 17.

== Career ==
In 1847, Weaver entered the Muskingum Conference. In 1848 he was ordained by Bishop Glossbrenner. In 1851 he was chosen presiding elder, and in 1857, he was a delegate to the General Conference at Cincinnati. The trustees of Otterbein College hired him as soliciting agent, a post he served for eight years. In 1861, the General Conference elected him bishop for the Pacific Coast. He declined, preferring to stay with the college.

In 1865, Weaver campaigned to be editor of the Religious Telescope. He lost election, but was instead selected by the General Conference to the office of bishop. In matters of policy, he was a moderate, often refusing to take a public position, but he was better as a preacher and author.

As a preacher he excelled. The pulpit was his throne, and when once on that throne he was a master of men. The art of public address was next to perfect in him, though, perhaps, he never studied rhetoric under a teacher an hour in his life. He was a born orator. His speech had the charm of magic, the magic was all divine.
In many respects he was of the Abraham Lincoln type - simple in life, unique in style, trenchant in humor, and eloquent and forceful in argument. His very presence in the public assembly was always an inspiration.

— W.M.Weekley, 1911

In 1893, age began to catch up with Weaver, and he was relieved of active duties, and elected bishop emeritus. Weaver died February 6, 1901.

== Publications ==
- Weaver, Jonathan (1873). Ministerial Salary. Dayton, Ohio: United Brethren Publishing House.
- Weaver, Jonathan (1878). The Doctrine of Universal Restoration Carefully Examined. Dayton, Ohio: United Brethren Publishing House.
- Weaver, Jonathan (1891). Divine Providence. Dayton, Ohio: United Brethren Publishing House.
- Weaver, Jonathan (1892). A Practical Comment on the Confession of the Faith of the United Brethren in Christ. Dayton, Ohio: United Brethren Publishing House.
- Weaver, Jonathan (1899). Heaven or That Better Country. Dayton, Ohio: United Brethren Publishing House.
- Weaver, Jonathan (1900). Christian Theology. Dayton, Ohio: United Brethren Publishing House.
- Weaver, Jonathan; Small, D.D. (eds.). Christian Doctrine. Dayton, Ohio: United Brethren Publishing House.
- Weaver, Jonathan. Discourses on the Resurrection. Dayton, Ohio: United Brethren Publishing House.
