= Harrison Township, Carroll County, Ohio =

Township in Ohio, US

- Township
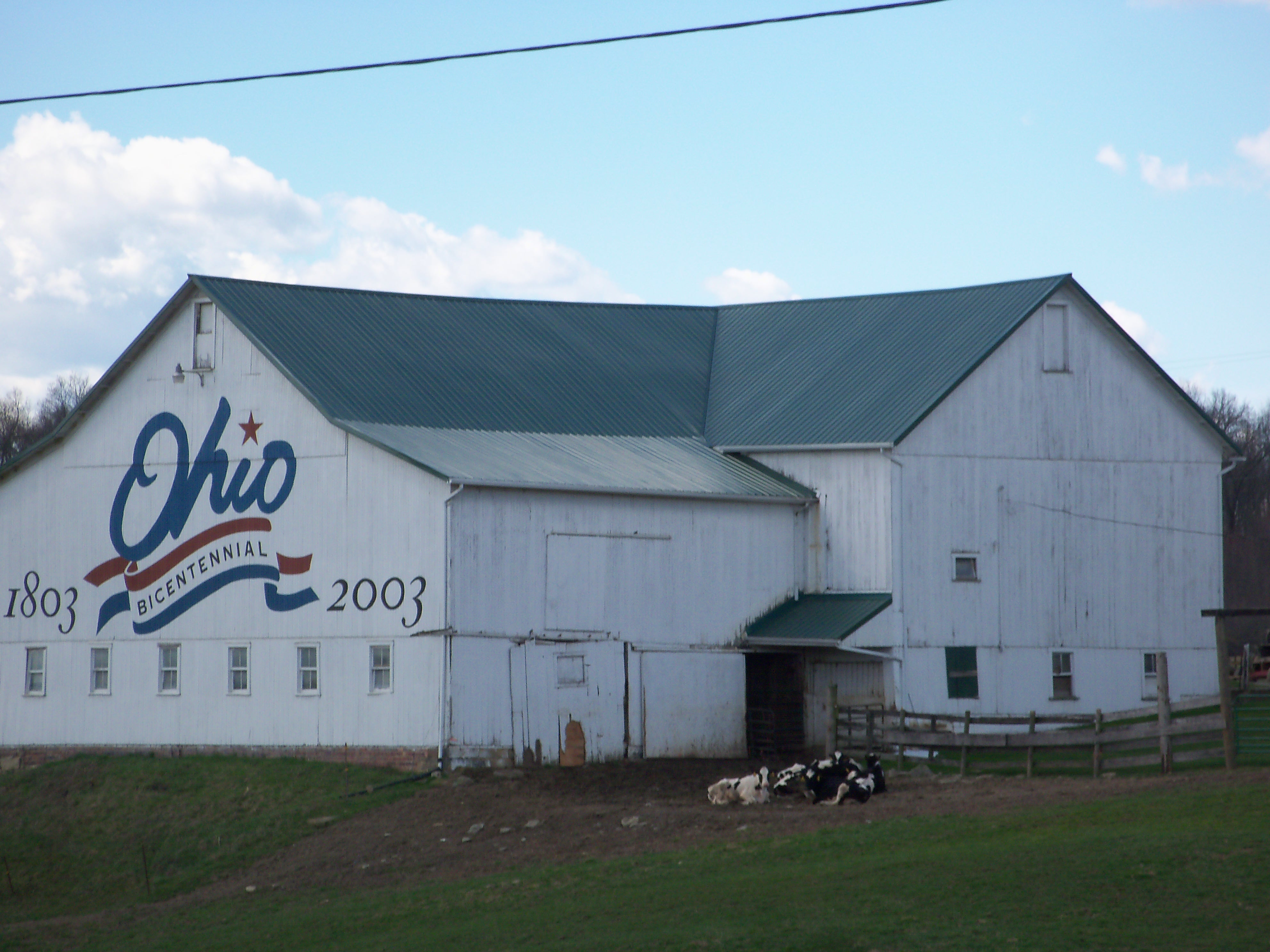
- Bicentennial Barn along Route 171 at 43

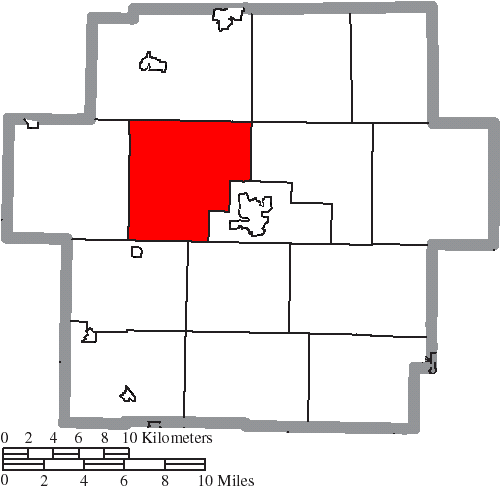
- Location of Harrison Township in Carroll County
- Coordinates: 40°36′48″N 81°8′55″W
- Country: United States
- State: Ohio
- County: Carroll

Area
  - Total: 31.4 sq mi (81.2 km^{2})
  - Land: 31.3 sq mi (81.1 km^{2})
  - Water: 0.039 sq mi (0.1 km^{2})
- Elevation: 1,135 ft (346 m)

Population (2020)
  - Total: 2,397
  - Density: 77/sq mi (29.6/km^{2})
- Time zone: UTC-5 (Eastern (EST))
  - Summer (DST): UTC-4 (EDT)
- FIPS code: 39-33782
- GNIS feature ID: 1085829
- Website: www.carrollcountyohio.us/townships/harrisontownship.html

Harrison Township is one of the fourteen townships of Carroll County, Ohio, United States. As of the 2020 census, the population was 2,397.

== Geography ==
Located in the west central part of the county, it borders the following townships:

- Brown Township - north
- Augusta Township - northeast corner
- Washington Township - east
- Center Township - southeast, north of Union Township
- Union Township - southeast, south of Center Township
- Monroe Township - southwest
- Rose Township - west

No municipalities are located in Harrison Township. The unincorporated community New Harrisburg is located centrally, and a small portion of the census-designated place of Lake Mohawk is located in the township's north.

== Name and history ==
It is one of nineteen Harrison Townships statewide.

In 1817, Harrison Township was formed from a part of Sandy Township in Stark County. The township originally was within Stark County until the formation of Carroll County. It had all of the original surveyed township 15, range 6 of the Old Seven Ranges, until the county commissioners took four and one-half sections in the formation of Centre (later Center) township.

A route of the Underground Railroad passed through the township along Baxter Ridge.

== Government ==
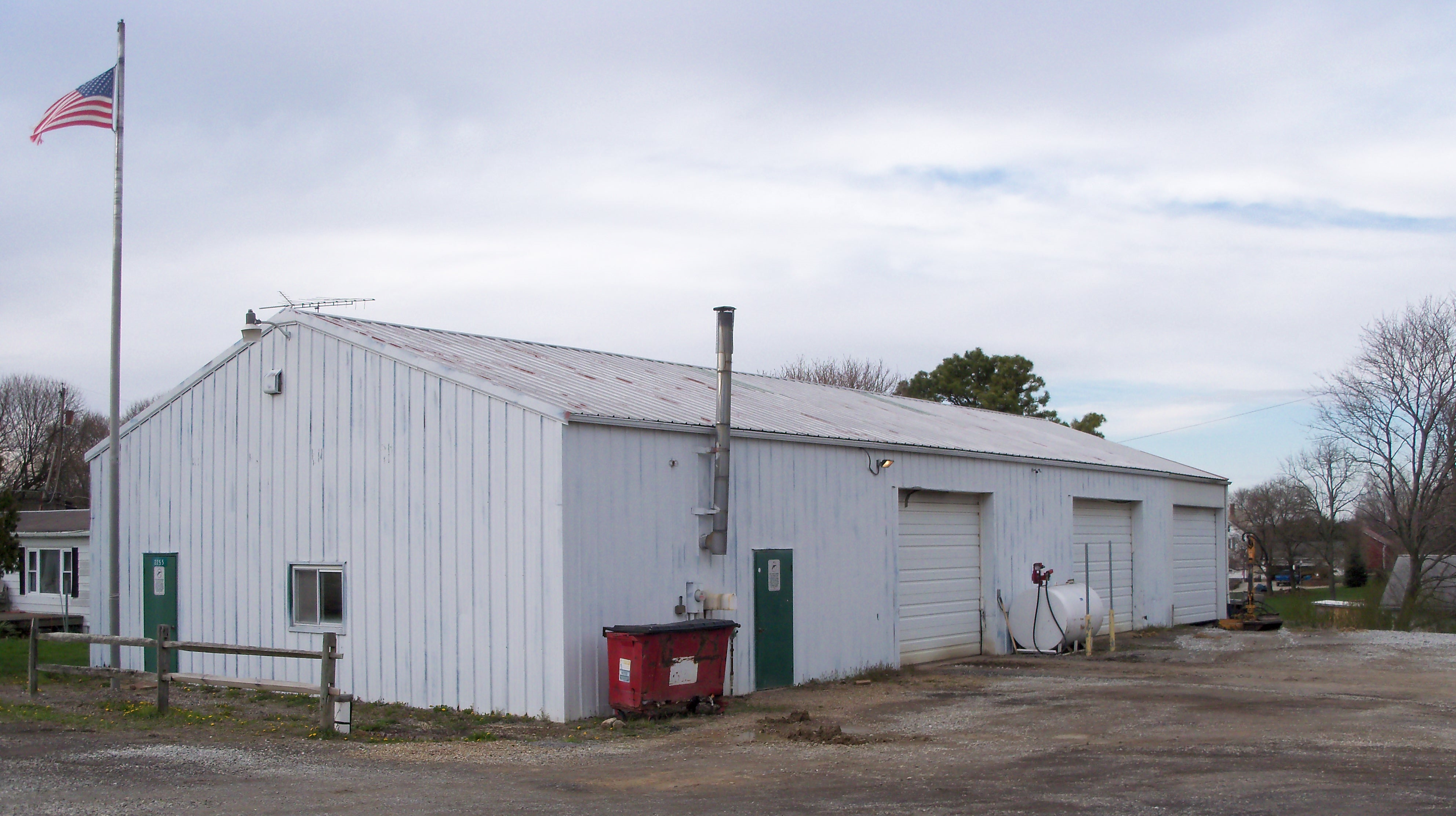
Town hall

Historical population
Census	Pop.	Note	%±
1820	518		—
1830	1,086		109.7%
1840	1,308		20.4%
1850	1,268		−3.1%
1860	1,033		−18.5%
1870	1,024		−0.9%
1880	1,075		5.0%
1890	915		−14.9%
1900	799		−12.7%
1910	750		−6.1%
1920	711		−5.2%
1930	678		−4.6%
1940	765		12.8%
1950	954		24.7%
1960	1,249		30.9%
1970	1,278		2.3%
1980	1,807		41.4%
1990	2,127		17.7%
2000	2,498		17.4%
2010	2,478		−0.8%
2020	2,397		−3.3%

The township is governed by a three-member board of trustees, who are elected in November of odd-numbered years to a four-year term beginning on the following January 1. Two are elected in the year after the presidential election and one is elected in the year before it. There is also an elected township fiscal officer, who serves a four-year term beginning on April 1 of the year after the election, which is held in November of the year before the presidential election. Vacancies in the fiscal officership or on the board of trustees are filled by the remaining trustees.

== Education ==
Students attend the Carrollton Exempted Village School District in most of the township and Brown Local School District in a corner of the township.

== Notable residents ==
- Leonard Harsh (1801–1866), member of the Ohio House of Representatives
- Isaac H. Taylor — lawyer, judge, and single-term U.S. Representative
- Jonathan Weaver - 19th century bishop of the Church of the United Brethren in Christ.
