= New Harrisburg, Ohio =

Unincorporated community in Ohio, U.S.

Coordinates: 40°37′17″N 81°08′45″W

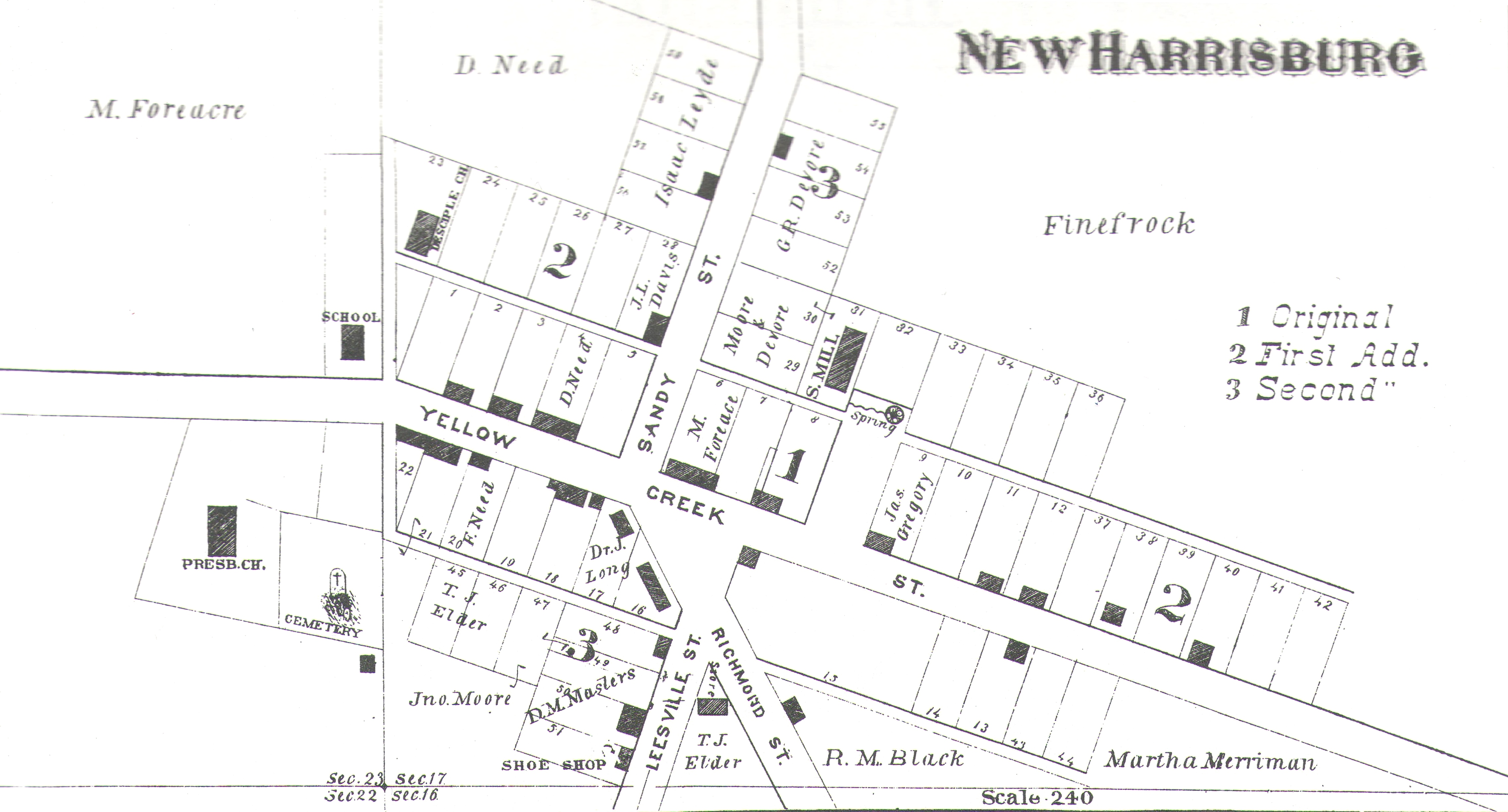
1874 map

New Harrisburg is an unincorporated community in Harrison Township, Carroll County, Ohio, United States. The community is part of the Canton–Massillon Metropolitan Statistical Area. The community is served by the Carrollton post office, and has ZIP code 44615. It lies on State route 171.

== History ==
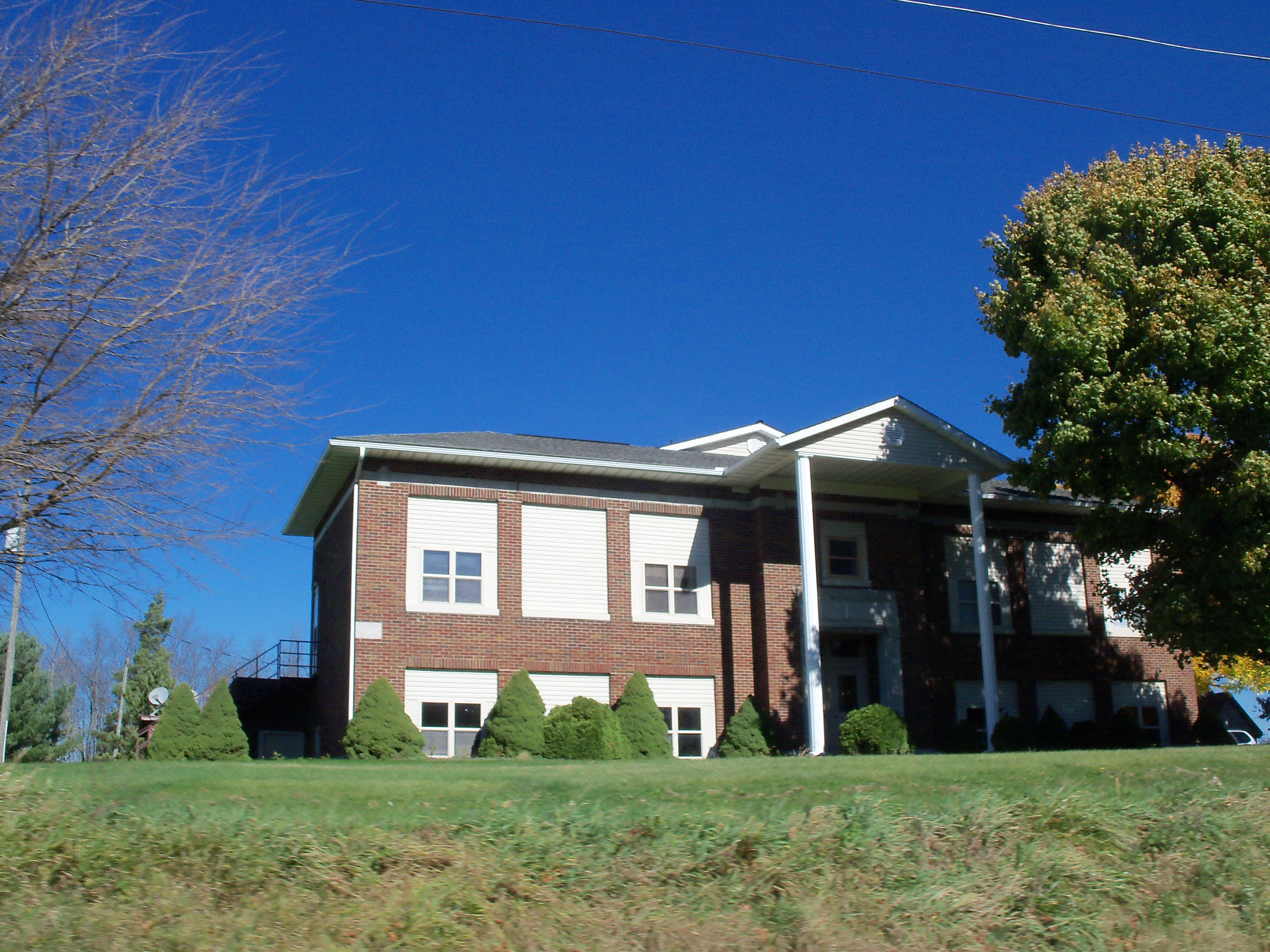
The old school in New Harrisburg

The village was platted by Jacob Harsh on December 26, 1828, along the Steubenville–Canton stage coach line established by Bezaleel Wells. It succeeded as a town until it was bypassed by the Connotton Valley Railroad. When Carroll County was considering a new courthouse in the early 1880s, a local merchant offered ten acres to relocate the county seat, but was unsuccessful. A writer in 1920 noted there was "nothing to note a commercial interest at this point – it only remains a memory of the older citizens of the county."

== Education ==
Students attend the Carrollton Exempted Village School District.

== Notable person ==
- Jonathan Weaver - 19th century bishop of the Church of the United Brethren in Christ
