= Waynesburg, Ohio =

- Village
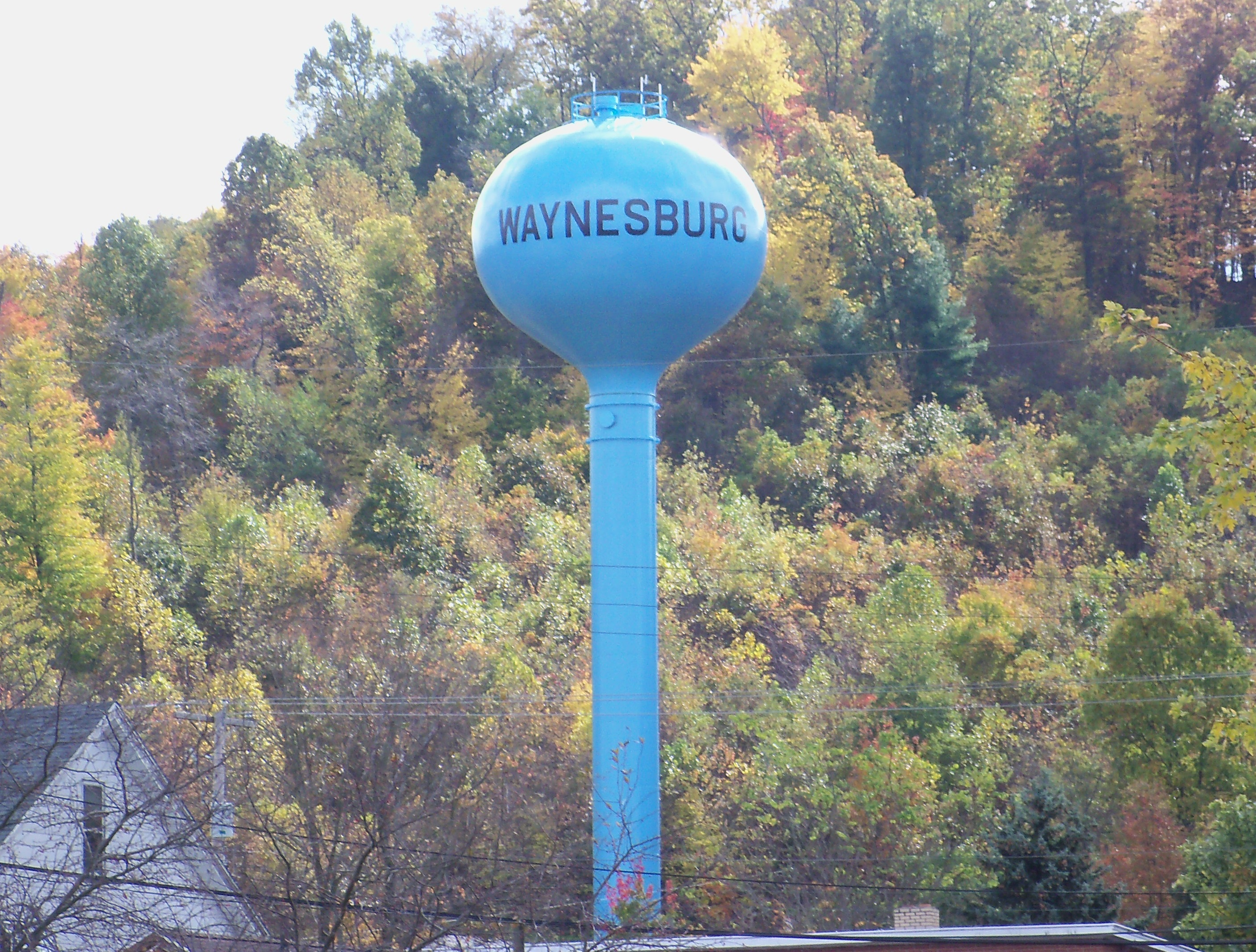
- Waynesburg water tower

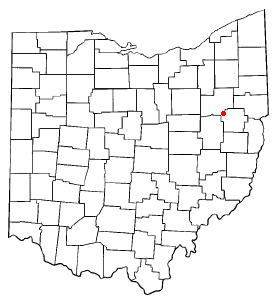
- Location within the state of Ohio

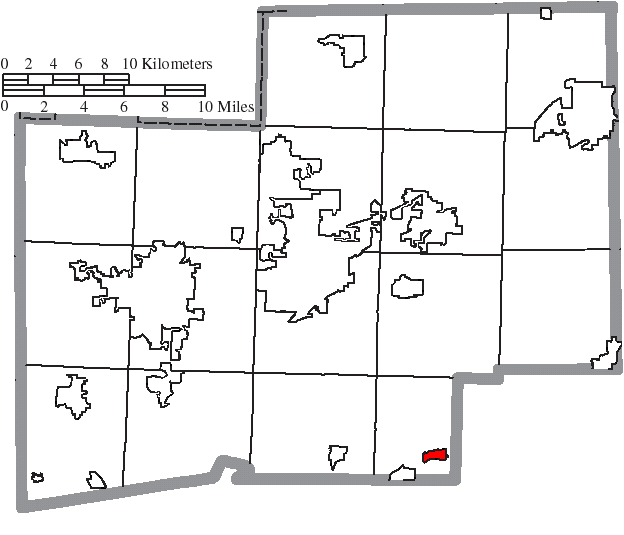
- Location of Waynesburg in Stark County
- Coordinates: 40°40′05″N 81°15′20″W
- Country: United States
- State: Ohio
- County: Stark
- Township: Sandy

Area
  - Total: 0.49 sq mi (1.28 km^{2})
  - Land: 0.49 sq mi (1.28 km^{2})
  - Water: 0 sq mi (0.00 km^{2})
- Elevation: 991 ft (302 m)

Population (2020)
  - Total: 925
  - Density: 1,874.8/sq mi (723.87/km^{2})
- Time zone: UTC-5 (Eastern (EST))
  - Summer (DST): UTC-4 (EDT)
- FIPS code: 39-82376
- GNIS feature ID: 2400115

Waynesburg is a village in southern Stark County, Ohio, United States. The population was 925 at the 2020 census. It is part of the Canton–Massillon metropolitan area.

== History ==
Waynesburg was platted in 1814, and named in honor of Anthony Wayne. A post office called Waynesburgh was established in 1824, and the name was changed to Waynesburg in 1893.

== Geography ==
Waynesburg is located along Sandy Creek.

According to the United States Census Bureau, the village has a total area of 0.52 square miles (1.35 km^{2}), all land.

Waynesburg lies at the intersection of Ohio State Routes 43 and 183 with SR 171 also present.

Waynesburg is also close to Lake Mohawk.

== Demographics ==
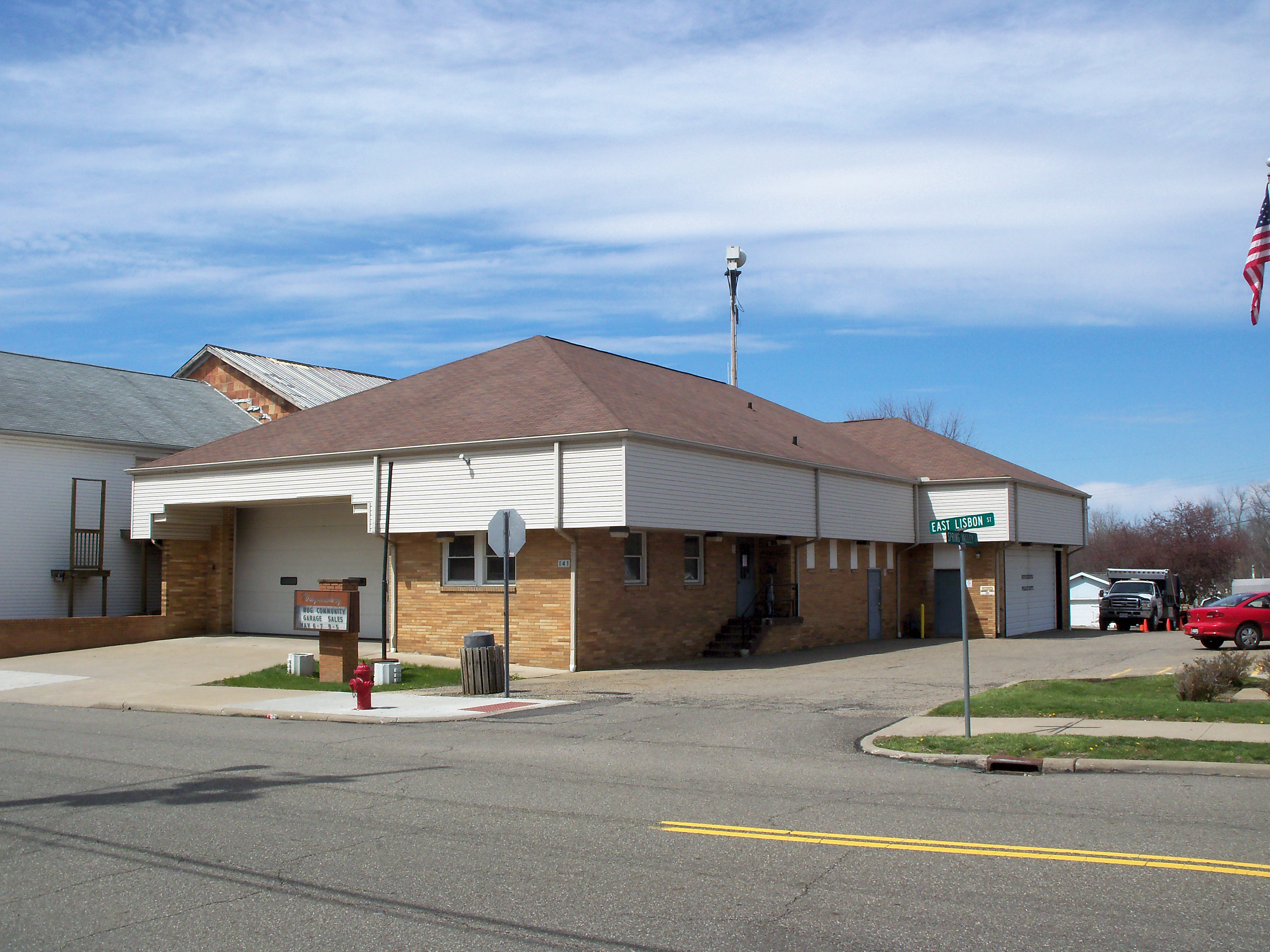
Waynesburg Village Hall

Historical population
Census	Pop.	Note	%±
1870	425		—
1880	622		46.4%
1890	510		−18.0%
1900	613		20.2%
1910	760		24.0%
1920	978		28.7%
1930	1,186		21.3%
1940	1,223		3.1%
1950	1,258		2.9%
1960	1,442		14.6%
1970	1,337		−7.3%
1980	1,160		−13.2%
1990	1,068		−7.9%
2000	1,003		−6.1%
2010	923		−8.0%
2020	925		0.2%

=== 2010 census ===
As of the census of 2010, there were 923 people, 361 households, and 249 families living in the village. The population density was 1,775.0 inhabitants per square mile (685.3/km^{2}). There were 408 housing units at an average density of 784.6 per square mile (302.9/km^{2}). The racial makeup of the village was 97.6% White, 1.0% African American, 0.1% Native American, 0.1% Asian, and 1.2% from two or more races. Hispanic or Latino of any race were 0.7% of the population.

There were 361 households, of which 33.8% had children under the age of 18 living with them, 47.1% were married couples living together, 16.9% had a female householder with no husband present, 5.0% had a male householder with no wife present, and 31.0% were non-families. 28.5% of all households were made up of individuals, and 14.7% had someone living alone who was 65 years of age or older. The average household size was 2.56 and the average family size was 3.10.

The median age in the village was 39 years. 25.7% of residents were under the age of 18; 8.2% were between the ages of 18 and 24; 24.4% were from 25 to 44; 28.1% were from 45 to 64; and 13.5% were 65 years of age or older. The gender makeup of the village was 50.2% male and 49.8% female.

=== 2000 census ===
As of the census of 2000, there were 1,003 people, 391 households, and 276 families living in the village. The population density was 1,944.5 inhabitants per square mile (750.8/km^{2}). There were 410 housing units at an average density of 794.9 per square mile (306.9/km^{2}). The racial makeup of the village was 95.71% White, 2.89% African American, 0.30% Native American, 0.20% Asian, and 0.90% from two or more races. Hispanic or Latino of any race were 1.00% of the population.

There were 391 households, out of which 35.0% had children under the age of 18 living with them, 50.4% were married couples living together, 15.3% had a female householder with no husband present, and 29.4% were non-families. 25.8% of all households were made up of individuals, and 14.8% had someone living alone who was 65 years of age or older. The average household size was 2.57 and the average family size was 3.09.

In the village, the population was spread out, with 27.2% under the age of 18, 7.1% from 18 to 24, 28.7% from 25 to 44, 20.6% from 45 to 64, and 16.4% who were 65 years of age or older. The median age was 36 years. For every 100 females there were 97.1 males. For every 100 females age 18 and over, there were 93.1 males.

The median income for a household in the village was $34,125, and the median income for a family was $39,861. Males had a median income of $34,792 versus $19,779 for females. The per capita income for the village was $14,996. About 13.2% of families and 16.4% of the population were below the poverty line, including 24.2% of those under age 18 and 4.5% of those age 65 or over.

== Education ==
Students attend the Sandy Valley Local School District. Students may also attend the parochial school called Saint James Elementary.

== Notable people ==
- William Bensinger, Union soldier who participated in the Great Locomotive Chase and received the Medal of Honor
- Joseph J. Cicchetti, soldier in the United States Army who received the Medal of Honor in World War II during actions in the Philippines campaign
