= Jonathan H. Wallace =

American politician

Jonathan Hasson Wallace

Member of the U.S. House of Representatives from Ohio's 18th district
- In office May 27, 1884 – March 3, 1885
- Preceded by: William McKinley
- Succeeded by: Isaac H. Taylor

Personal details
- Born: October 31, 1824 Columbiana County, Ohio, US
- Died: October 28, 1892 (aged 67) Lisbon, Ohio, US
- Resting place: Lisbon Cemetery
- Party: Democratic
- Spouse: Elizabeth L. McCook
- Children: four
- Education: Washington College

Jonathan Hasson Wallace (October 31, 1824 – October 28, 1892) was an American lawyer and politician who served briefly as a United States Congressman from Ohio from 1884 to 1885. He is known for winning his seat in Congress in a contested election over incumbent Republican congressman, and future U.S. president, William McKinley in a contentious vote. The dispute over the outcome of the election rose all the way to the U.S. House, which named Wallace the winner.

== Biography ==
Wallace was born in St. Clair Township, Columbiana County, Ohio. He graduated from Washington College (now Washington and Jefferson College), Washington, Pennsylvania in 1844. He studied law in the office of Benjamin Stanton, and eventually became the prosecuting attorney of Columbiana County in 1851 and 1853.

=== Congress ===
He successfully contested as a Democrat the election of William McKinley, to the Forty-eighth United States Congress and served from May 27, 1884, to March 3, 1885. He ran again in 1884 and lost.

=== Later career and death ===
He was appointed judge of the court of common pleas by Ohio Governor George Hoadly on March 5, 1885, to fill a vacancy and served one year; he continued the practice of law until his death in Lisbon, Ohio. He was interred in Lisbon Cemetery.

Wallace married Elizabeth L. McCook of Columbiana County in August, 1848, and had four children.

U.S. House of Representatives
Preceded by William McKinley	Member of the U.S. House of Representatives from Ohio's 18th congressional district 1884 - 1885	Succeeded by Isaac Hamilton Taylor
