= Pekin, Carroll County, Ohio =

Pekin, Ohio
- Census-designated place
- Location within Ohio Location within the United States
- Coordinates: 40°43′17″N 81°07′34″W
- Country: United States
- State: Ohio
- County: Carroll
- Township: Brown

Area
  - Total: 0.50 sq mi (1.29 km^{2})
  - Land: 0.50 sq mi (1.29 km^{2})
  - Water: 0 sq mi (0.00 km^{2})
- Elevation: 1,050 ft (320 m)

Population (2020)
  - Total: 314
  - Density: 628.5/sq mi (242.65/km^{2})
- Time zone: UTC-5 (Eastern (EST))
  - Summer (DST): UTC-4 (EDT)
- ZIP Code: 44657 (Minerva)
- Area codes: 330/234
- FIPS code: 39-61448
- GNIS feature ID: 2805300

Pekin is an unincorporated community and census-designated place (CDP) in Carroll County, Ohio, United States. It was first listed as a CDP prior to the 2020 census.

The CDP is on the northern edge of Carroll County, in northeastern Brown Township. It is bordered to the east by the village of Minerva and to the north by Paris Township in Stark County. Ohio State Route 183 (Valley Street) passes through the southern part of the CDP, leading northeast into Minerva and southwest 4 miles (6 km) to Malvern. Canton is 17 miles (27 km) to the northwest via U.S. Route 30 from Minerva.

Pekin is on the north side of Sandy Creek, a southwest-flowing tributary of the Tuscarawas River, part of the Ohio River watershed.

== Demographics ==
Historical population
Census	Pop.	Note	%±
2020	314		—
U.S. Decennial Census
