= Malvern High School (Ohio) =

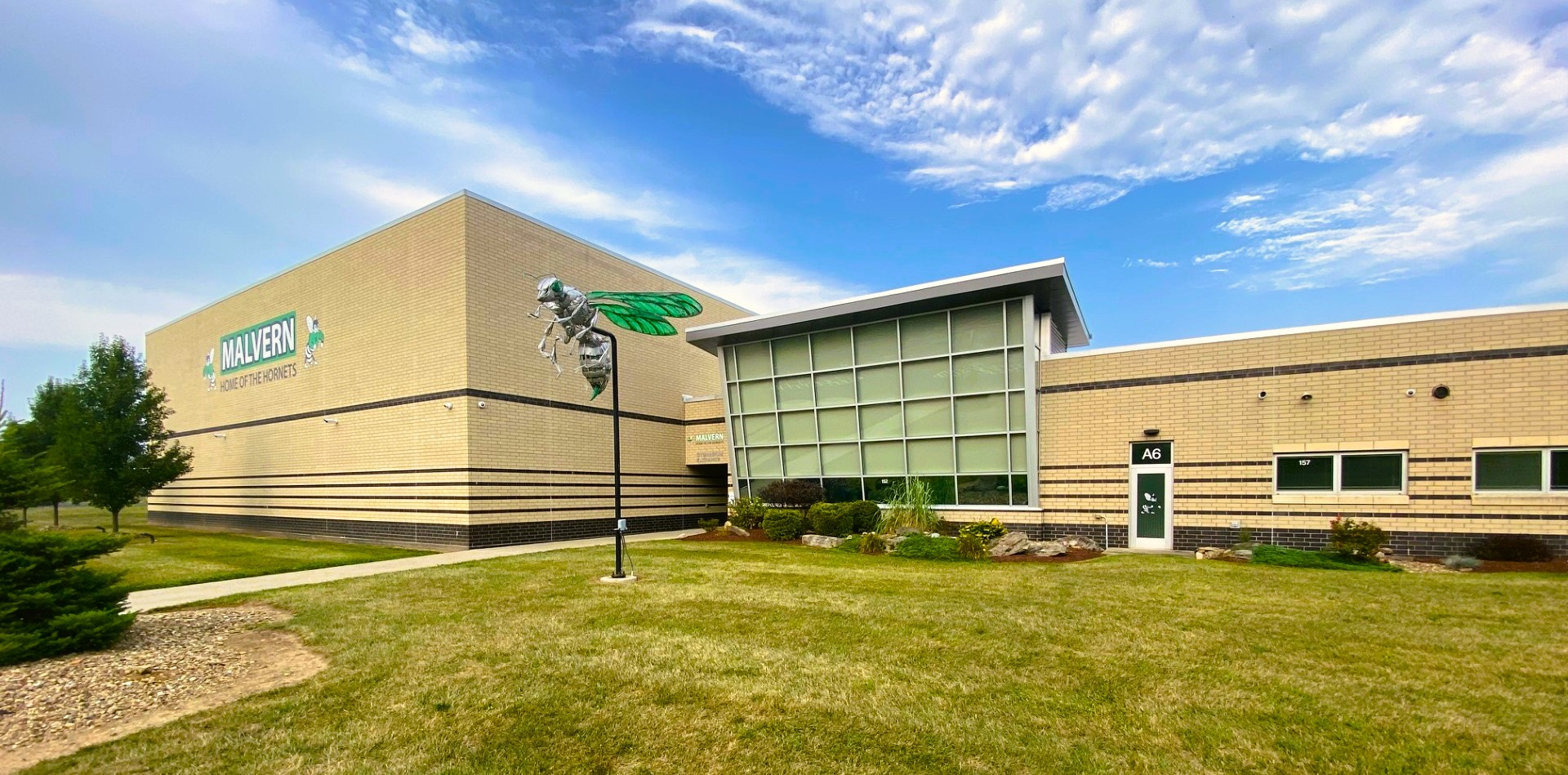

Location
- 3242 Coral Road NW; Malvern, Ohio 44644; United States
- Coordinates: 40°41′14″N 81°09′45″W

Information
- Type: Public, Coeducational high school
- Established: 1890
- School district: Brown Local School District
- Superintendent: Mark Scott
- Principal: Timothy Babiczuk
- Teaching staff: 21.20 (FTE)
- Grades: 9-12
- Student to teacher ratio: 8.21
- Colors: Green and White
- Athletics conference: Inter-Valley Conference
- Team name: Hornets
- Rival: East Canton Hornets
- OHSAA School ID: 934
- OHSAA Football Division: VII
- OHSAA Football Region: 25
- Website: www.brownlocalschools.com/o/mhs

Malvern High School is a public high school in Malvern, Ohio, United States. It is the only high school in the Brown Local School District. Sports teams are called the Hornets, and they compete in the Ohio High School Athletic Association as a member of the Inter-Valley Conference.

== School Board Members ==
- Tammie Hulit, President
- Chad Browning, Vice President
- Tara Bowe, Member
- Dechelle Thompson, Member
- Rob Ruegg, Member

== Facility ==
Construction of the school building began in October 2014. The 112,000 square foot building features a two-story academic wing that will be home to the entire student population, yet keep the elementary, middle and high school students segregated. Common spaces include two gymnasiums, media center and a student dining area. The project has been co-funded by the Ohio Facilities Construction Commission (OFCC) as part of their Exceptional Needs Program.

=== Last Hoorah in Hornet Gym ===
The final basketball game in the Hornet Gym (1970-2016) was held on Friday, February 12, 2016. Several past players and coaches were in attendance. A celebration was held at the conclusion of the game.

== Athletics ==
=== Football ===
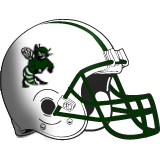

==== 1999 ====
The Hornets clinched a share of the IVC Championship with a 35-21 Week 9 win over West Lafayette-Ridgewood. The championship was their first since 1992. They finished the regular season 9-1.

Malvern landed the #8 spot in the OHSAA Division V Regional Playoffs (Region 23), drawing Amanda-Clearcreek. The Aces were the clear favorite not only to win the game, but to win the Division V Championship. The Hornets played tough against the Aces early, taking a slight lead of 7-6 in the first half after blocking a punt and returning it for a touchdown. But Amanda was just too powerful and dominated the line of scrimmage on their way to a 22-7 win. The 22 points given up by the Hornets were the fewest points the Aces would score throughout the rest of the OHSAA playoffs on their way to the Division V State Championship.

Malvern finished the season 9-2.

==== 2008 ====
The Hornets posted a perfect season going 10-0 winning the IVC, District and Regional Championships and ending the season with an overall record of 13-1 after losing to Hopewell-Louden in the State Semi-Final. This was their only appearance in the State Final Four.

==== 2009 ====
The football team again had an outstanding season going 11-2 for the season eventually losing to Grove City Christian in the Regional final.

==== 2010 ====
2010 was a season of change for the Hornets having lost 19 of 22 starters from the 2009 team. The team started out 2-3 but with two big wins over Newcomerstown and undefeated Strasburg, they went 5-0 the rest of the season to end the regular season with a record of 7-3. In the first round of the playoffs they faced a familiar opponent in Symmes Valley. In 2009 Willow Wood Symmes Valley had traveled to Malvern in the first round of the OHSAA playoffs. This season it would be Malvern's turn to travel the nearly 4 1/2 hour trip to Vikings Field. The Hornets came away with a win defeating Symmes Valley 48-28. In the second round Malvern faced Shadyside and were defeated 20-41. The Hornets finished the season with an 8-4 record.

==== 2011 ====
The Hornets have started out with a record of 4-0 and were ranked #1 in Ohio Division VI according to the 2011 Foortball AP Poll in weeks 3 and 4. They ended the season with a record of 10-2 and co-champions of the IVC. This is the fifth straight year the Hornets have qualified for the playoffs, and the fourth straight year they have reached at least the second round.

The seniors are the winningest group in school history with a 42-9 mark. They have played in 11 playoff games, posting a 7-4 record. They have won two league titles and one regional title, reaching the state semifinals during their freshman season in 2008.

==== 2012 ====
The Hornets ended the 2012 season with a record of 10-2 losing in the OHSAA regional semifinal game for the third straight season. The Hornets finished the season with a #2 rank in Region 21. Malvern’s running game has racked up nearly 3,000 yards through 11 games, as the Hornets earned their sixth straight playoff berth.

==== 2013 ====
The Hornets captured the IVC title outright with a win over rival Sandy Valley in the final game of the regular season. With a loss to Caldwell in the first round of the playoffs, the Hornets ended the season 8-3 overall and 5-1 in the Inter-Valley Conference and finish ranked #3 in Region 25, Division 7.

=== Basketball ===
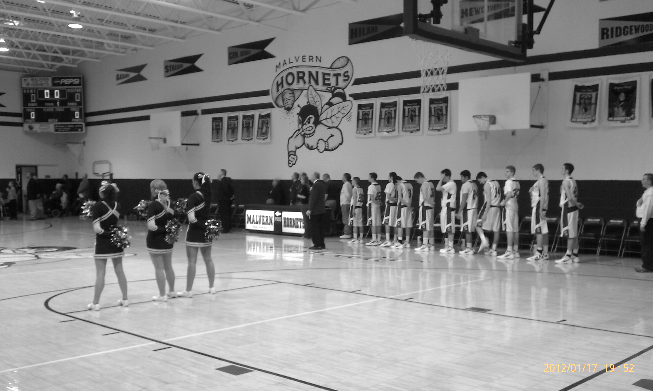
Hornet Boys Basketball Pregame

==== 2008 ====
The Hornets had a perfect season going 20-0 in the regular season winning its first IVC Championship in Boys Basketball. They finished their season 25-1 after losing to Bedford Chanel in the Regional final. The Hornets were led by the outstanding play of their top 3 scorers Trevor Halter, Zak Kapron, and Tyler Tucci. Each of them scored over 1000 points in their careers at Malvern with Tyler Tucci eventually becoming the Hornets all-time leading scorer with over 1500 points.

==== 2012 ====
Boys: For the third year straight the Hornets were defeated by Zanesville Rosecrans in the Division IV boys basketball district tournament semifinals at Meadowbrook High. With the loss the Hornets end their season with a 19-4 record.
