= Carroll County, Ohio =

County in Ohio, United States

- County
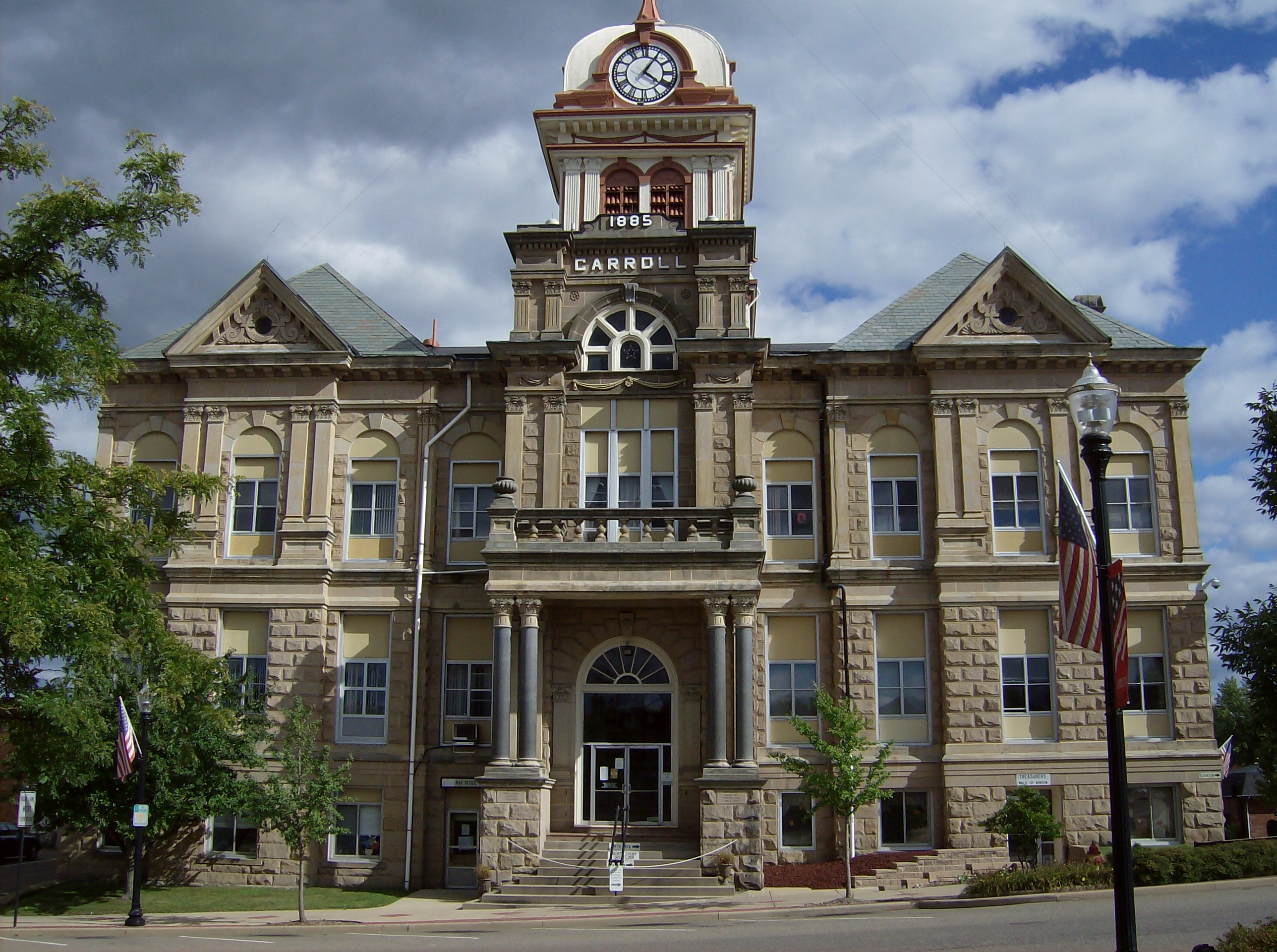
- Carroll County Courthouse

- Flag Seal

- Location within the U.S. state of Ohio
- Coordinates: 40°35′N 81°05′W
- Country: United States
- State: Ohio
- Founded: January 1, 1833
- Named for: Charles Carroll of Carrollton
- Seat: Carrollton
- Largest village: Carrollton*

Area
  - Total: 399 sq mi (1,030 km^{2})
  - Land: 395 sq mi (1,020 km^{2})
  - Water: 4.3 sq mi (11 km^{2}) 1.1%

Population (2020)
  - Total: 26,721
  - Estimate (2025): 26,475 ▼
  - Density: 67/sq mi (26/km^{2})
- Time zone: UTC−5 (Eastern)
  - Summer (DST): UTC−4 (EDT)
- Congressional district: 6th
- Website: www.carrollcountyohio.us
- Based on population just within the county.

Carroll County is a county located in the state of Ohio. As of the 2020 census, the population was 26,721. Its county seat is Carrollton, while its largest village is Minerva. It is named for Charles Carroll of Carrollton, the last surviving signer of the Declaration of Independence. Carroll County is part of the Canton-Massillon, OH Metropolitan Statistical Area, which is also included in the Cleveland-Akron-Canton, OH Combined Statistical Area. It is in the Appalachian Ohio region.

== History ==
Carroll County was formed on December 25, 1832, from portions of Columbiana, Harrison, Jefferson, Stark, and Tuscarawas counties.

Carroll County lies upon an ancient trail known as the Great Trail, connecting the forks of the Ohio with Lake Erie and the inland plains.

== Geography ==
According to the U.S. Census Bureau, the county has a total area of 399 square miles (1,030 km^{2}), of which 395 square miles (1,020 km^{2}) is land and 4.3 square miles (11 km^{2}) (1.1%) is water. It is the fifth smallest county in Ohio in land area and smallest in total area.

=== Adjacent counties ===
- Columbiana County (northeast)
- Jefferson County (southeast)
- Harrison County (south)
- Tuscarawas County (southwest)
- Stark County (northwest)

=== Major highways ===
- SR 9
- SR 39
- SR 43
- SR 164
- SR 171
- SR 183
- SR 212
- SR 332
- SR 524
- SR 542

== Demographics ==
Historical population
Census	Pop.	Note	%±
1840	18,108		—
1850	17,685		−2.3%
1860	15,738		−11.0%
1870	14,491		−7.9%
1880	16,416		13.3%
1890	17,566		7.0%
1900	16,811		−4.3%
1910	15,761		−6.2%
1920	15,942		1.1%
1930	16,057		0.7%
1940	17,449		8.7%
1950	19,039		9.1%
1960	20,857		9.5%
1970	21,579		3.5%
1980	25,598		18.6%
1990	26,521		3.6%
2000	28,836		8.7%
2010	28,836		0.0%
2020	26,721		−7.3%
2025 (est.)	26,475	▼	−0.9%
U.S. Decennial Census; 1790-1960 1900-90; 1990-2000 2020 2025

=== 2020 census ===
As of the 2020 census, the county had a population of 26,721. The median age was 46.2 years. 20.8% of residents were under the age of 18 and 22.2% of residents were 65 years of age or older. For every 100 females there were 100.3 males, and for every 100 females age 18 and over there were 98.3 males age 18 and over.

The racial makeup of the county was 94.7% White, 0.5% Black or African American, 0.3% American Indian and Alaska Native, 0.2% Asian, <0.1% Native Hawaiian and Pacific Islander, 0.5% from some other race, and 3.8% from two or more races. Hispanic or Latino residents of any race comprised 1.1% of the population.

<0.1% of residents lived in urban areas, while 100.0% lived in rural areas.

There were 11,065 households in the county, of which 26.3% had children under the age of 18 living in them. Of all households, 52.5% were married-couple households, 19.0% were households with a male householder and no spouse or partner present, and 21.4% were households with a female householder and no spouse or partner present. About 27.7% of all households were made up of individuals and 14.0% had someone living alone who was 65 years of age or older.

There were 13,395 housing units, of which 17.4% were vacant. Among occupied housing units, 78.1% were owner-occupied and 21.9% were renter-occupied. The homeowner vacancy rate was 1.7% and the rental vacancy rate was 8.1%.

=== Racial and ethnic composition ===
Carroll County, Ohio – Racial and ethnic composition Note: the US Census treats Hispanic/Latino as an ethnic category. This table excludes Latinos from the racial categories and assigns them to a separate category. Hispanics/Latinos may be of any race.
Race / Ethnicity (NH = Non-Hispanic)	Pop 1980	Pop 1990	Pop 2000	Pop 2010	Pop 2020	% 1980	% 1990	% 2000	% 2010	% 2020
White alone (NH)	25,277	26,192	28,193	28,044	25,204	98.75%	98.76%	97.77%	97.25%	94.32%
Black or African American alone (NH)	115	134	153	133	122	0.45%	0.51%	0.53%	0.46%	0.46%
Native American or Alaska Native alone (NH)	29	65	91	70	73	0.11%	0.25%	0.32%	0.24%	0.27%
Asian alone (NH)	29	29	33	56	52	0.11%	0.11%	0.11%	0.19%	0.19%
Native Hawaiian or Pacific Islander alone (NH)	x	x	7	0	3	x	x	0.02%	0.00%	0.01%
Other race alone (NH)	31	2	7	14	56	0.12%	0.01%	0.02%	0.05%	0.21%
Mixed race or Multiracial (NH)	x	x	194	281	912	x	x	0.67%	0.97%	3.41%
Hispanic or Latino (any race)	117	99	158	238	299	0.46%	0.37%	0.55%	0.83%	1.12%
Total	25,598	26,521	28,836	28,836	26,721	100.00%	100.00%	100.00%	100.00%	100.00%

=== 2010 census ===
As of the 2010 United States census, there were 28,836 people, 11,385 households, and 8,067 families living in the county. The population density was 73.1 inhabitants per square mile (28.2/km^{2}). There were 13,698 housing units at an average density of 34.7 units per square mile (13.4 units/km^{2}). The racial makeup of the county was 97.8% white, 0.5% black or African American, 0.3% American Indian, 0.2% Asian, 0.2% from other races, and 1.1% from two or more races. Those of Hispanic or Latino origin made up 0.8% of the population. In terms of ancestry, 29.2% were German, 14.4% were Irish, 11.3% were American, 9.8% were English, and 6.1% were Italian.

Of the 11,385 households, 29.8% had children under the age of 18 living with them, 57.4% were married couples living together, 8.8% had a female householder with no husband present, 29.1% were non-families, and 24.3% of all households were made up of individuals. The average household size was 2.50 and the average family size was 2.95. The median age was 43.1 years.

The median income for a household in the county was $43,148 and the median income for a family was $51,700. Males had a median income of $42,481 versus $26,587 for females. The per capita income for the county was $21,575. About 9.0% of families and 12.6% of the population were below the poverty line, including 18.7% of those under age 18 and 7.1% of those age 65 or over.

=== 2000 census ===
As of the census of 2000, there were 28,836 people, 11,126 households, and 8,155 families living in the county. The population density was 73 inhabitants per square mile (28/km^{2}). There were 13,016 housing units at an average density of 33 units per square mile (13/km^{2}). The racial makeup of the county was 98.20% White, 0.54% Black or African American, 0.32% Native American, 0.11% Asian, 0.02% Pacific Islander, 0.09% from other races, and 0.71% from two or more races. 0.55% of the population were Hispanic or Latino of any race. 30.1% were of German, 13.5% American, 13.3% Irish, 9.8% English, and 6.6% Italian ancestry according to Census 2000.

There were 11,126 households, out of which 31.90% had children under the age of 18 living with them, 61.90% were married couples living together, 7.70% had a female householder with no husband present, and 26.70% were non-families. 22.90% of all households were made up of individuals, and 10.40% had someone living alone who was 65 years of age or older. The average household size was 2.56 and the average family size was 3.00.

In the county, the population was spread out, with 25.10% under the age of 18, 7.50% from 18 to 24, 27.50% from 25 to 44, 25.70% from 45 to 64, and 14.20% who were 65 years of age or older. The median age was 39 years. For every 100 females there were 98.00 males. For every 100 females age 18 and over, there were 95.40 males.

The median income for a household in the county was $35,509, and the median income for a family was $41,114. Males had a median income of $31,611 versus $21,285 for females. The per capita income for the county was $16,701. About 8.50% of families and 11.40% of the population were below the poverty line, including 17.20% of those under age 18 and 11.10% of those age 65 or over.

== Politics ==
Carroll County is a Republican stronghold county. The only Democratic candidates to win the county were Woodrow Wilson in 1912, Lyndon B. Johnson in 1964, and Bill Clinton both in 1992 and 1996, but Jimmy Carter came within 85 votes of carrying it in 1976.

United States presidential election results for Carroll County, Ohio
Year	Republican		Democratic		Third party(ies)	
Year	No.	%	No.	%	No.	%
1856	1,750	56.60%	1,255	40.59%	87	2.81%
1860	1,767	59.28%	1,043	34.99%	171	5.74%
1864	1,826	59.79%	1,228	40.21%	0	0.00%
1868	1,807	58.37%	1,289	41.63%	0	0.00%
1872	1,817	58.61%	1,283	41.39%	0	0.00%
1876	2,060	56.94%	1,554	42.95%	4	0.11%
1880	2,241	58.00%	1,569	40.61%	54	1.40%
1884	2,314	55.88%	1,665	40.21%	162	3.91%
1888	2,405	55.81%	1,746	40.52%	158	3.67%
1892	2,261	53.97%	1,677	40.03%	251	5.99%
1896	2,668	57.07%	1,955	41.82%	52	1.11%
1900	2,668	59.58%	1,720	38.41%	90	2.01%
1904	2,695	65.05%	1,278	30.85%	170	4.10%
1908	2,517	59.42%	1,590	37.54%	129	3.05%
1912	1,096	29.45%	1,293	34.74%	1,333	35.81%
1916	2,086	53.69%	1,672	43.04%	127	3.27%
1920	4,392	70.18%	1,755	28.04%	111	1.77%
1924	4,369	70.78%	1,430	23.17%	374	6.06%
1928	5,572	80.32%	1,321	19.04%	44	0.63%
1932	4,487	59.75%	2,802	37.31%	221	2.94%
1936	4,440	53.26%	3,801	45.59%	96	1.15%
1940	5,160	58.98%	3,589	41.02%	0	0.00%
1944	4,898	62.75%	2,907	37.25%	0	0.00%
1948	4,283	58.57%	2,996	40.97%	34	0.46%
1952	5,707	64.55%	3,134	35.45%	0	0.00%
1956	5,916	69.55%	2,590	30.45%	0	0.00%
1960	6,095	63.60%	3,488	36.40%	0	0.00%
1964	3,655	41.99%	5,050	58.01%	0	0.00%
1968	4,634	52.39%	3,119	35.26%	1,093	12.36%
1972	5,984	66.39%	2,755	30.56%	275	3.05%
1976	5,091	49.31%	5,006	48.48%	228	2.21%
1980	5,806	58.94%	3,476	35.29%	569	5.78%
1984	6,703	63.33%	3,771	35.63%	110	1.04%
1988	6,179	56.20%	4,667	42.45%	148	1.35%
1992	4,224	33.89%	4,731	37.96%	3,508	28.15%
1996	4,449	37.74%	4,792	40.64%	2,549	21.62%
2000	6,732	54.91%	4,960	40.45%	569	4.64%
2004	7,695	54.53%	6,300	44.64%	117	0.83%
2008	7,097	50.75%	6,423	45.93%	465	3.32%
2012	7,315	55.07%	5,543	41.73%	426	3.21%
2016	9,254	70.38%	3,154	23.99%	740	5.63%
2020	10,745	75.49%	3,251	22.84%	237	1.67%
2024	10,634	76.76%	3,071	22.17%	148	1.07%

United States Senate election results for Carroll County, Ohio1
Year	Republican		Democratic		Third party(ies)	
Year	No.	%	No.	%	No.	%
2024	9,543	69.87%	3,545	25.95%	571	4.18%

== Government ==
=== County officials ===
County officials
Party	Name	Position
R	Donald E. Leggett II	Commissioner
R	Christopher R. Modranski	Commissioner
R	Robert E. Wirkner	Commissioner
R	Lynn Fairclough	Auditor
D	William R. Wohlwend	Clerk of Courts
R	Mandal B. Haas	Coroner
R	Brian J. Wise	Engineer
R	Steven D. Barnett	Prosecuting Attorney
R	Patricia Oyer	Recorder
R	Calvin A. Graham	Sheriff
R	Jeff Yeager	Treasurer

=== Judicial representation ===
Judgeships
Party	Name	Position
R	Michael V. Repella II	Court of Common Pleas
R	Sean R. H. Smith	Court of Common Pleas Probate Court
R	Gary L. Willen	Carroll County Municipal Court
D	Cheryl L. Waite	7th District Court of Appeals
R	Carol Ann Robb	7th District Court of Appeals
D	David A. D’Apolito	7th District Court of Appeals
R	Mark A. Hanni	7th District Court of Appeals

=== Legislative representation ===
Legislators
Party	Name	District	Body
R	Monica Robb Blasdel	79	Ohio House of Representatives
R	Al Cutrona	33	Ohio Senate
R	Michael Rulli	6	U.S. House of Representatives
R	Bernie Moreno	Statewide	U.S. Senate
R	Jon Husted	Statewide	U.S. Senate

== Culture ==
The Great Trail Festival, a festival of old fashioned music, arts and crafts, is held near the village of Malvern each year at the end of August and the beginning of September. A celebration of Ohio's colonial history, the event focuses particularly on the region's Native American and French heritage, complete with a small herd of buffalo and battle reenactment.

The Algonquin Mill Fest is another local festival. Held 4 miles south of Carrollton on SR 332 at the Algonquin Mill - a pioneer village with one room schoolhouse, steam-powered saw and flour mills, as well as several other historic buildings. Hand made arts and crafts are sold, along with flour milled during the festival, a pancake breakfast and chicken barbecue dinners.

Flight Fest in Malvern is a remote-control airplane competition.

== Education ==
=== Public school districts ===
- Brown Local School District
- Carrollton Exempted Village School District
- Conotton Valley Union Local School District

==== High schools ====
- Carrollton High School
- Conotton Valley High School
- Malvern High School

== Communities ==
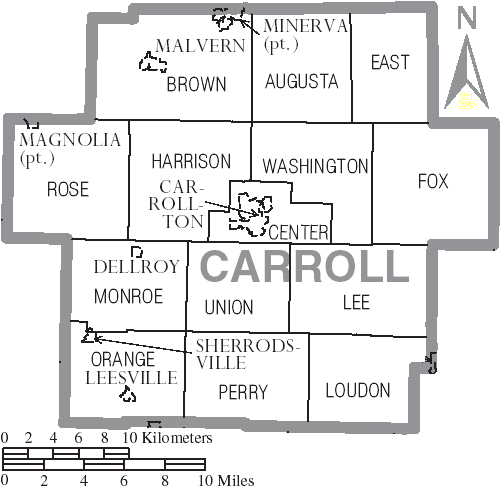
Map of Carroll County, Ohio with Municipal and Township Labels

=== Villages ===
- Carrollton (county seat)
- Dellroy
- Leesville
- Magnolia
- Malvern
- Minerva
- Sherrodsville

=== Townships ===
- Augusta
- Brown
- Center
- East
- Fox
- Harrison
- Lee
- Loudon
- Monroe
- Orange
- Perry
- Rose
- Union
- Washington

=== Census-designated places ===
- Lake Mohawk
- Pekin

=== Unincorporated communities ===
- Augusta
- Harlem Springs
- Kilgore
- Leavittsville
- Lindentree
- Mechanicstown
- Morges
- New Harrisburg
- Oneida
- Pattersonville
- Petersburg
- Scroggsfield
- Wattsville

== See also ==
- National Register of Historic Places listings in Carroll County, Ohio
