= James M. Tuttle =

American politician

James Madison Tuttle
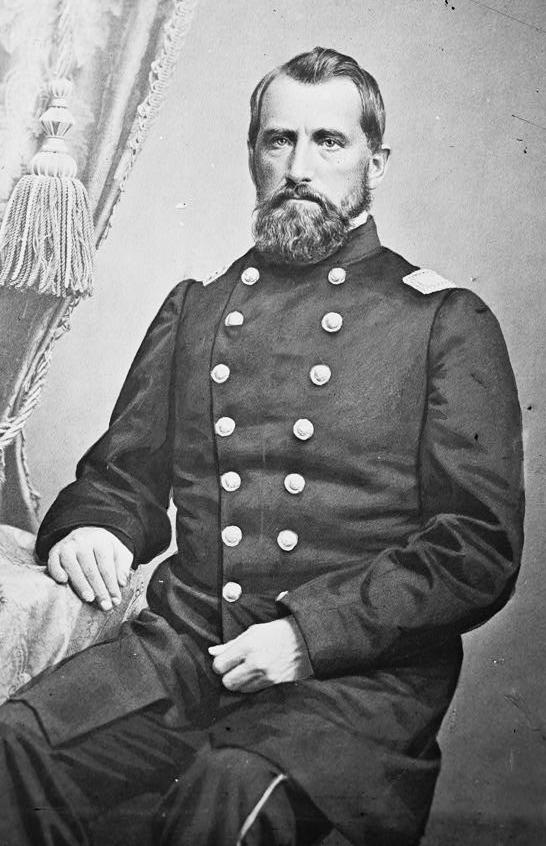
- Gen. James M. Tuttle
- Born: September 24, 1823; Summerfield, Ohio
- Died: October 24, 1892 (aged 69); Casa Grande, Arizona
- Burial place: Woodland Cemetery, Des Moines, Iowa
- Military career
- Allegiance: United States of America; Union
- Branch: United States Army; Union Army
- Service years: 1861–1864
- Rank: Brigadier General
- Unit: Army of the Tennessee
- Commands: 3rd Division, XV Corps; 1st Division, XVI Corps
- Conflicts: American Civil War; Battle of Fort Donelson; Battle of Shiloh; Siege of Corinth; Vicksburg Campaign
- Other work: businessman, Iowa state representative

Member of the Iowa House of Representatives from the Polk County district
- In office 1884–1885 Serving with Charles L. Watrous
- Preceded by: Thomas W. Havens and Thomas E. Haines
- Succeeded by: Wesley Redhead and J. G. Berryhill
- In office 1872–1872 Serving with John A. Kasson
- Preceded by: John A. Kasson and George W. Jones
- Succeeded by: William G. Madden and Isaac Brandt

James Madison Tuttle (September 24, 1823 – October 24, 1892) was a soldier, businessman, and politician from the state of Iowa who served as a general in the Union Army during the American Civil War. He commanded a brigade and then a division in the Army of the Tennessee in several campaigns in the Western Theater of operations. He led the first Union troops that entered the enemy-held Fort Donelson in 1862, paving the way for the fort's subsequent surrender to Ulysses S. Grant and opening the Cumberland River as an avenue of invasion of the South.

== Early life and career ==
James M. Tuttle was born near Summerfield, Ohio, in rural Noble County (then Monroe County) to James and Esther (Crow) Tuttle. When he was ten years old, Tuttle's family moved to Indiana, where his father, a Maine-born farmer who kept migrating westward, finally settled in Fayette County. Young Tuttle was educated in the common schools of Ohio and Indiana.

In the spring of 1846 the 23-year-old Tuttle moved to Farmington, Iowa, where he engaged both in agricultural and mercantile pursuits. He briefly returned to Fayette County, Indiana, in the fall of 1847, where he married Elizabeth Conner on September 22. They established a household in Farmington. Elizabeth Tuttle died on their fourth wedding anniversary. On August 17, 1853, Tuttle married Ohio-born Laura M. Meek in Farmington; they would have five children together.

Tuttle entered local politics as a Democrat, and was elected in 1855 as the sheriff of Van Buren County, serving two years. In the autumn of 1857, he was elected as the County Treasurer and Recorder, serving a pair of 2-year terms.

== Civil War service ==
Following the outbreak of the war in April 1861, Tuttle raised a company of volunteers and was elected as its captain. He and his men traveled to Keokuk, where they were assigned to the 2nd Iowa Infantry, the first three-years regiment organized in Iowa. The regiment soon elected Tuttle as its lieutenant colonel, and the regiment was mustered formally into Federal service on May 27. The 2nd Iowa was assigned to duty under General Grant, who promoted Tuttle to colonel on September 6 of that year.

At the February 1862 Battle of Fort Donelson in Tennessee, he led his regiment in a successful charge into the Confederate earthworks. Tuttle's men planted the first Union flag inside Fort Donelson. Despite being wounded, Tuttle stayed in command throughout the assault. At the Battle of Shiloh in April, Tuttle commanded a brigade in Maj. Gen. W. H. L. Wallace's division, composed of the 2nd, 7th, 8th, 12th and 14th Iowa Infantry, as well as an artillery battery. After Wallace was mortally wounded and the other ranking officers also fell, Tuttle temporarily assumed command of the division and led the 2nd Division troops in fighting around the "Hornet's Nest," where he barely escaped capture. In recognition of his gallantry in action at Fort Donelson and Shiloh, he was promoted to brigadier general on June 9, 1862. BG Thomas A. Davies took command of the division during the Siege of Corinth, and Tuttle returned to brigade command.

During the fall and winter of 1862, General Tuttle commanded the Union garrison at the vital supply town of Cairo, Illinois. In the spring of 1863, he was assigned command of a division in Maj. Gen. William T. Sherman's XV Corps. Tuttle went on to participate that summer in the Vicksburg Campaign and thereafter the capture of Jackson, Mississippi, where he again distinguished himself in action and parlayed his growing name recognition into a run for Governor of Iowa as a Democrat. In the autumn elections, Tuttle was defeated by another Shiloh veteran, Republican William M. Stone.

In 1864, while commanding the forces around Natchez, Mississippi, Tuttle ordered the Roman Catholic Bishop of Natchez, William Henry Elder, to have certain prayers for the President of the United States recited publicly in the churches of his diocese. Elder refused and petitioned President Abraham Lincoln for relief from the order. Through the efforts of U.S. Senator Francis Kernan, Elder was granted the freedom to practice his religion without obeying Tuttle's directive.

In September 1864, Tuttle resigned his commission and returned to civilian life in Iowa.

== Postbellum career ==
After the war, Tuttle settled in Des Moines, Iowa, where he was engaged in various mining and manufacturing interests, including partnerships in mines in Colorado, Arizona, and New Mexico. Among his many business interests was Tuttle Brothers, a pork packing operation he owned with his brother Martin.

In 1866, he was the Democratic candidate for the U.S. Congress, but was beaten by former general Grenville M. Dodge in the general election. In 1871, he was elected to the Iowa House of Representatives and served one term. He served as the state commander of the Grand Army of the Republic for the Department of Iowa.

In 1883, Tuttle switched political parties and was easily elected to another term in the Iowa House as a Republican. Three years later, he was named as the president of the board of directors for the Iowa Soldiers Home.

== See also ==
- List of American Civil War generals (Union)

== Notes ==
Party political offices
Preceded by William H. Merritt	Democratic nominee for Governor of Iowa; 1863	Succeeded by Thomas H. Benton
