= Brown Local School District =

School district in Ohio

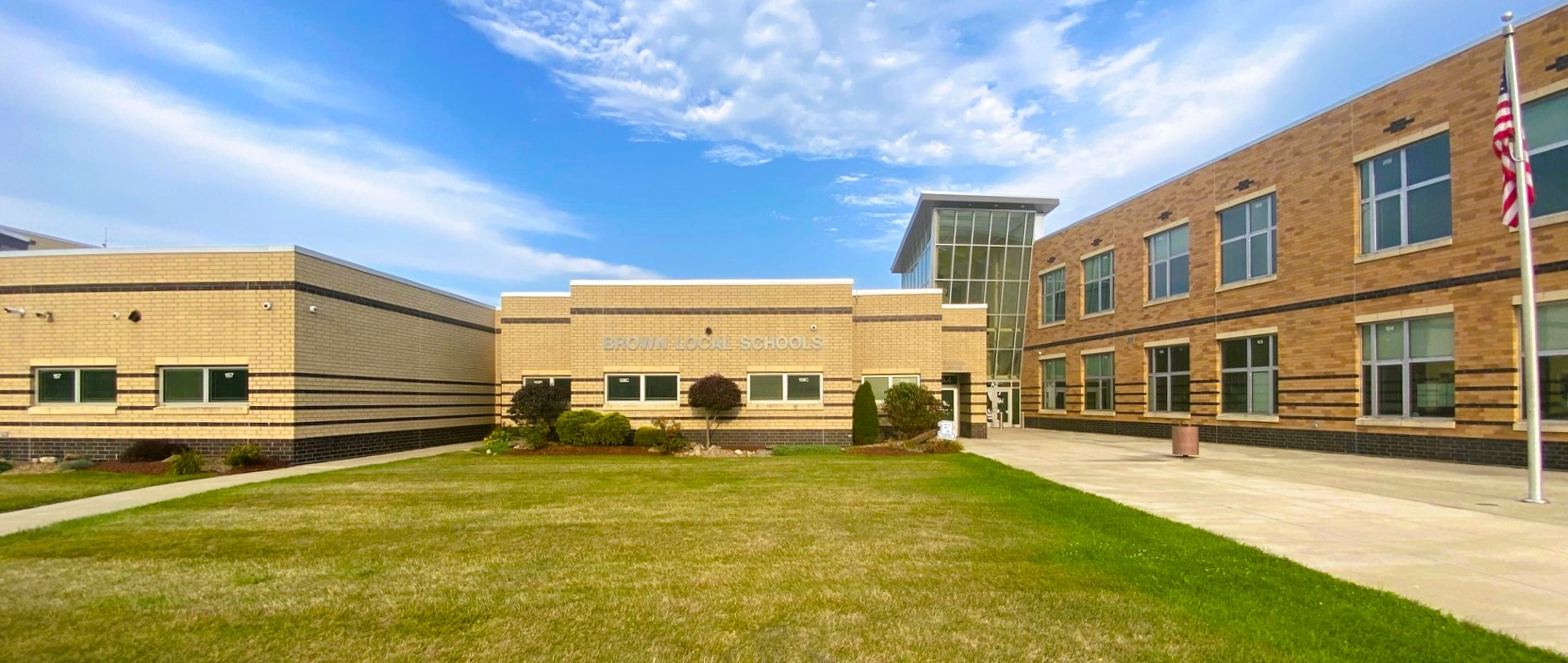

Address
- 3242 Coral Road Northwest Malvern, Ohio, 44644; United States

District information
- Type: Public
- Grades: K–12
- NCES District ID: 3904617

Students and staff
- Students: 606
- Teachers: 43.35 (FTE)
- Staff: 142.44 (FTE)
- Student–teacher ratio: 13.98

Other information
- Website: www.brownlocalschools.com

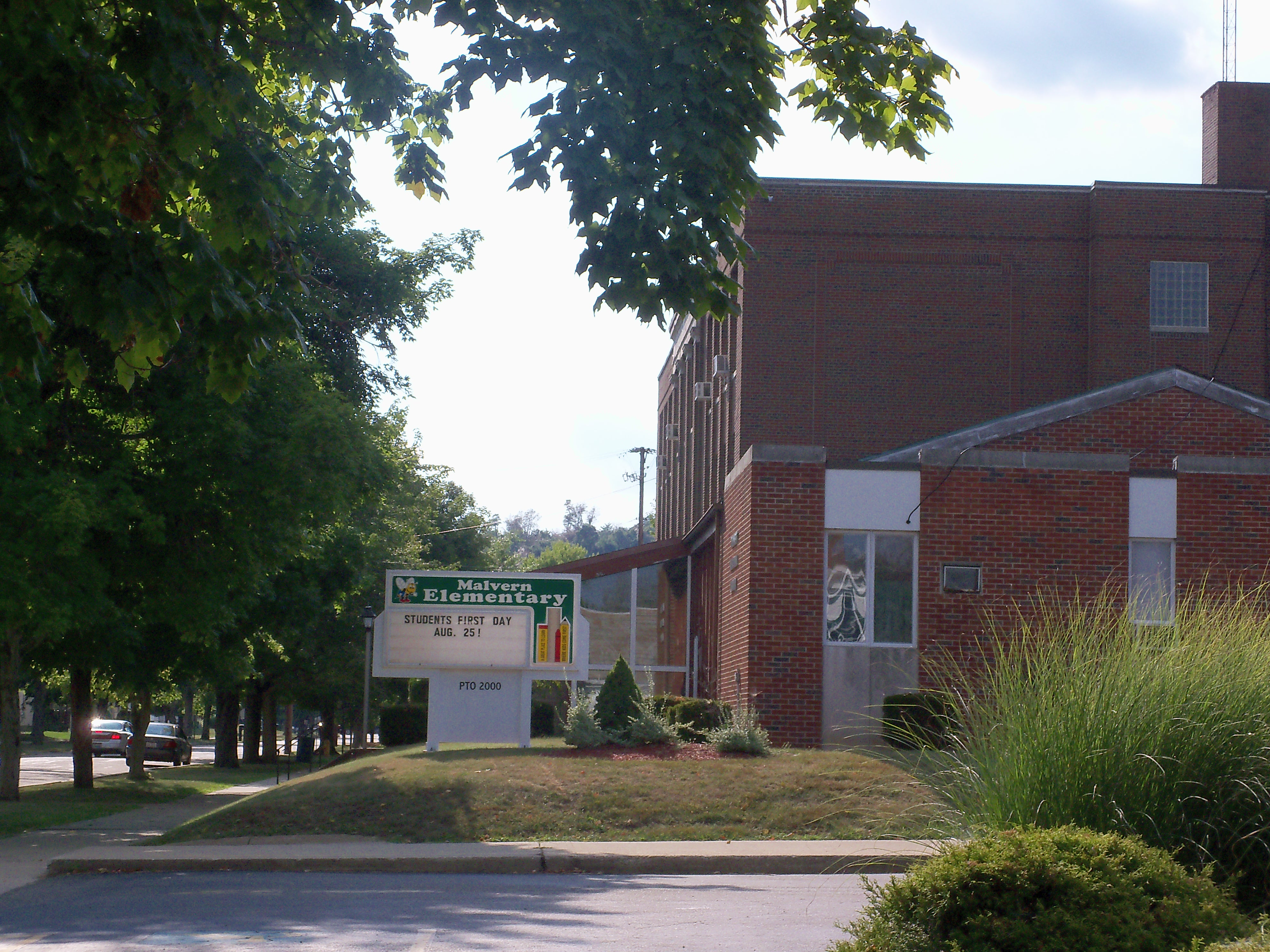
Malvern Elementary

Brown Local Schools is a school district located in Carroll County, Ohio, United States. The only high school for the district is located in Malvern, Ohio and is called Malvern High School.

== See also ==
- List of school districts in Ohio
