= Malvern, Ohio =

- Village
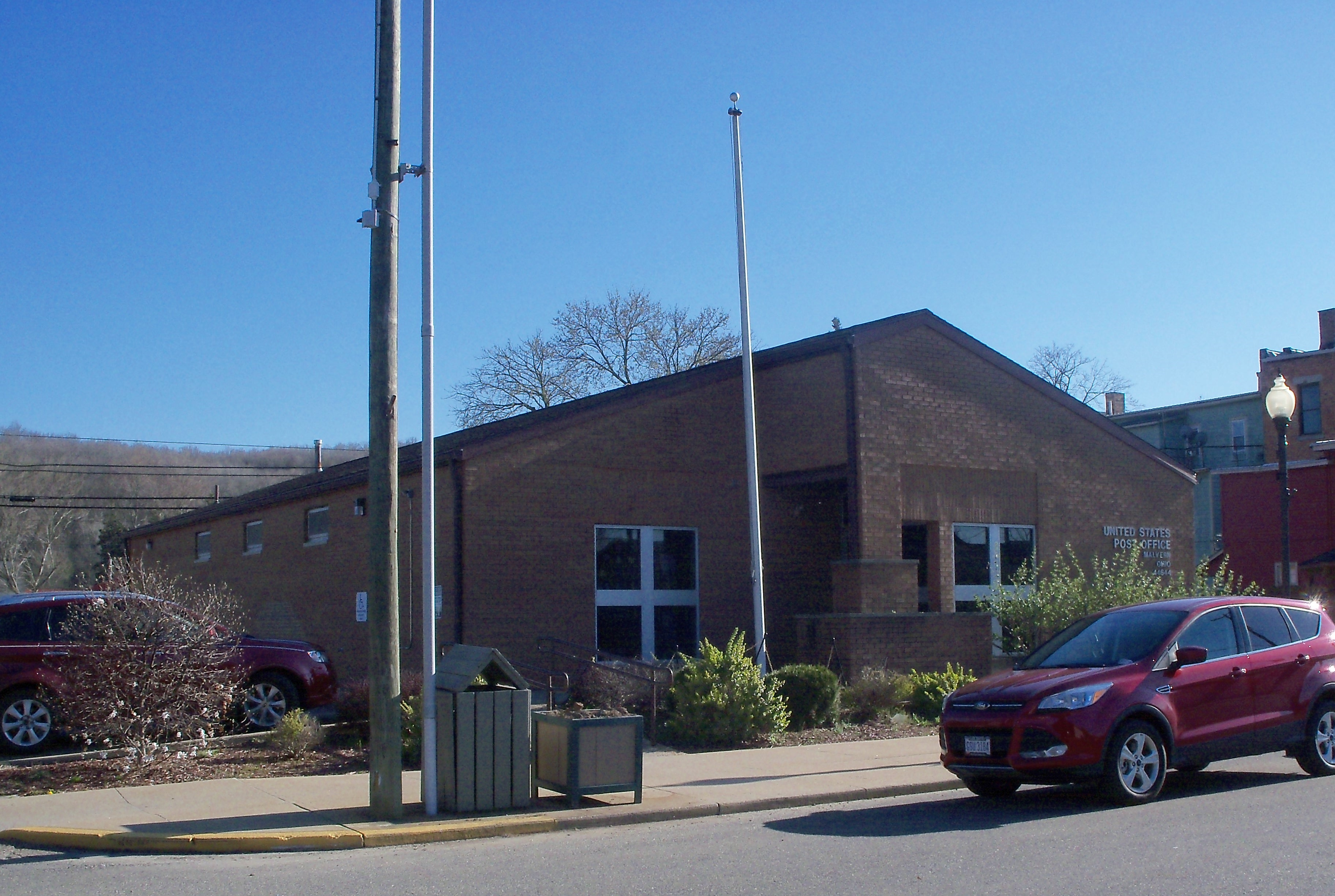
- Malvern Post Office

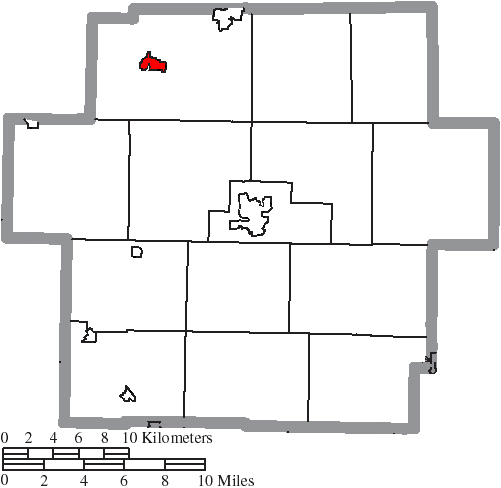
- Location in Carroll County, Ohio

- Location within Ohio Location within the United States
- Coordinates: 40°41′22″N 81°10′49″W
- Country: United States
- State: Ohio
- County: Carroll
- Township: Brown
- Settled: 1806
- Platted: 1834
- Incorporated: May 31, 1869

Government
  - Type: Mayor–council

Area
  - Total: 0.73 sq mi (1.89 km^{2})
  - Land: 0.73 sq mi (1.89 km^{2})
  - Water: 0 sq mi (0.00 km^{2})
- Elevation: 994 ft (303 m)

Population (2020)
  - Total: 1,110
  - Density: 1,524.6/sq mi (588.67/km^{2})
- Time zone: UTC-5 (Eastern (EST))
  - Summer (DST): UTC-4 (EDT)
- ZIP code: 44644
- Area code: 330
- FIPS code: 39-46998
- GNIS feature ID: 2399235
- School District: Brown Local
- Website: villageofmalvern.net

Malvern (/ˈmælvərn/ MAL-vərn) is a village in northwestern Carroll County, Ohio, United States. The population was 1,110 at the 2020 census. It is part of the Canton–Massillon metropolitan area.

== History ==
Malvern was laid out in 1834 by Rev. William Hardesty as the village of Troy. It was renamed to Malvern in 1840. On May 31, 1869, Malvern was incorporated as a village. Home of some of the first paving bricks made in Ohio (1893), made by the Malvern Clay Company and the Canton & Malvern Fire Clay Paving Brick Company. These companies produced some 7.5 million and 9.0 million bricks per year, as in the year 1893. These bricks can be seen around Malvern today, in both buildings, foundations, and streets.

== Geography ==
Malvern is located along Sandy Creek. According to the United States Census Bureau, the village has a total area of 0.67 square miles (1.74 km^{2}), all land.

Malvern lies along Ohio State Route 43. Malvern is near the second-largest privately owned man-made lake in Ohio, Lake Mohawk, which uses the Malvern ZIP code.

== Demographics ==
Historical population
Census	Pop.	Note	%±
1870	269		—
1890	638		—
1900	709		11.1%
1910	753		6.2%
1920	979		30.0%
1930	1,100		12.4%
1940	1,177		7.0%
1950	1,277		8.5%
1960	1,320		3.4%
1970	1,256		−4.8%
1980	1,032		−17.8%
1990	1,112		7.8%
2000	1,218		9.5%
2010	1,189		−2.4%
2020	1,110		−6.6%

=== 2010 census ===
As of the census of 2010, there were 1,189 people, 522 households, and 329 families living in the village. The population density was 1,774.6 inhabitants per square mile (685.2/km^{2}). There were 573 housing units at an average density of 855.2 per square mile (330.2/km^{2}). The racial makeup of the village was 93.8% White, 3.8% African American, 0.3% Native American, 0.3% Asian, 0.5% from other races, and 1.3% from two or more races. Hispanic or Latino of any race were 2.2% of the population.

There were 522 households, of which 26.6% had children under the age of 18 living with them, 44.1% were married couples living together, 15.1% had a female householder with no husband present, 3.8% had a male householder with no wife present, and 37.0% were non-families. 31.2% of all households were made up of individuals, and 14.9% had someone living alone who was 65 years of age or older. The average household size was 2.27 and the average family size was 2.83.

The median age in the village was 42.4 years. 20.6% of residents were under the age of 18; 8.7% were between the ages of 18 and 24; 23.3% were from 25 to 44; 29.6% were from 45 to 64; and 17.8% were 65 years of age or older. The gender makeup of the village was 48.4% male and 51.6% female.

=== 2000 census ===
As of the census of 2000, there were 1,218 people, 530 households, and 332 families living in the village. The population density was 1,784.8 inhabitants per square mile (689.1/km^{2}). There were 576 housing units at an average density of 844.1 per square mile (325.9/km^{2}). The racial makeup of the village was 91.30% White, 6.73% African American, 0.25% Asian, 0.57% from other races, and 1.15% from two or more races. Hispanic or Latino of any race were 0.90% of the population.

There were 530 households, out of which 28.1% had children under the age of 18 living with them, 47.7% were married couples living together, 11.3% had a female householder with no husband present, and 37.2% were non-families. 33.0% of all households were made up of individuals, and 18.9% had someone living alone who was 65 years of age or older. The average household size was 2.30 and the average family size was 2.87.

In the village, the population was spread out, with 22.7% under the age of 18, 9.6% from 18 to 24, 28.1% from 25 to 44, 21.8% from 45 to 64, and 17.8% who were 65 years of age or older. The median age was 39 years. For every 100 females there were 90.0 males. For every 100 females age 18 and over, there were 78.7 males.

The median income for a household in the village was $29,063, and the median income for a family was $35,476. Males had a median income of $27,833 versus $22,188 for females. The per capita income for the village was $15,535. About 11.6% of families and 12.8% of the population were below the poverty line, including 14.9% of those under age 18 and 14.7% of those age 65 or over.

== Education ==
Public education in the village of Malvern is provided by the Brown Local School District. Malvern has a public library which is a branch of the Carroll County District Library.

== Notable people ==
- Albert R. Haines, member of the Ohio Senate
- Don Nigro, playwright
- Ed Poole, Major League Baseball pitcher
- Theodore Newton Vail, former president of American Telephone & Telegraph
