= Meyers Lake (disambiguation) =

Meyers Lake may refer to:

- Meyers Lake, Ohio, a village in Ohio
- Meyers Lake (Wisconsin), a lake in Wisconsin
- Meyers Lake (Ontario), a lake in Canada
