= Republic Stamping and Enameling =

Defunct American manufacturing company

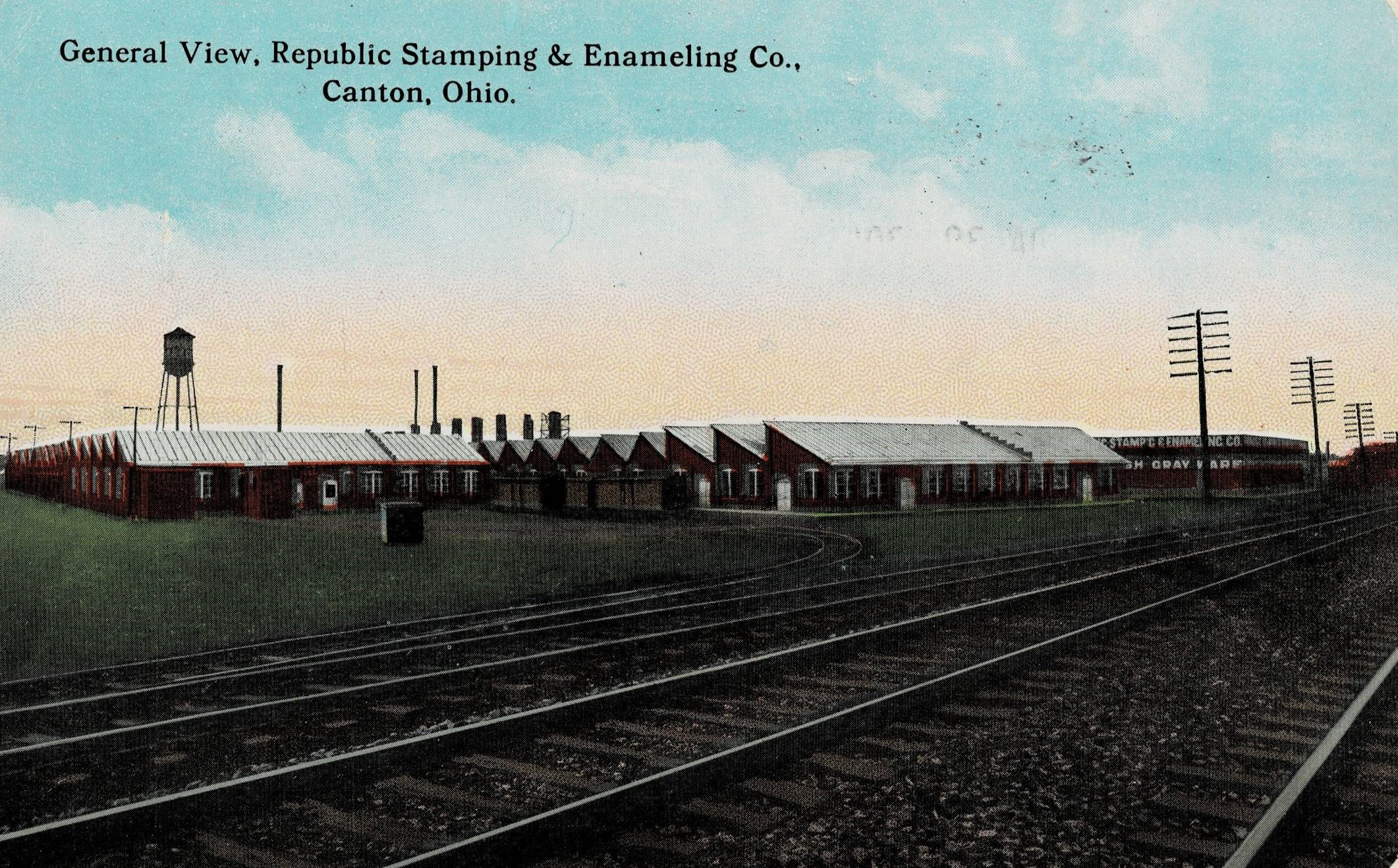
Republic Stamping and Enameling, circa 1914

Republic Stamping and Enameling was an enamelware manufacturing company in Canton, Ohio. It operated from 1907 until 1952 when Ecko Products of Chicago purchased it. The company was founded by a group of investors led by Henry C. Milligan (1853–1940), an inventor who held several patents for improvements in enamelware manufacturing.

== Founder ==
Milligan, a New Jersey native whose father was secretary-treasurer of the Central Railroad of New Jersey, had worked in various metalworking factories. He founded the company after working at the Carnahan Stamping & Enameling Co. in Canton, which he had helped establish. Milligan was granted a patent in 1884 for one-coat granite ware that would serve as a basis for some of the processes at the company. He also obtained a patent in 1904 for enameling steelware that provided a smoother finish. Milligan was involved in many other civic and business interests in Northeast Ohio, including serving for many years as a director of National City bank of Cleveland. Milligan also chaired a Congressionally-appointed committee that studied the enamelware industry globally after World War I and recommended steep tariffs to protect U.S. plants such as his own.

== History and growth ==
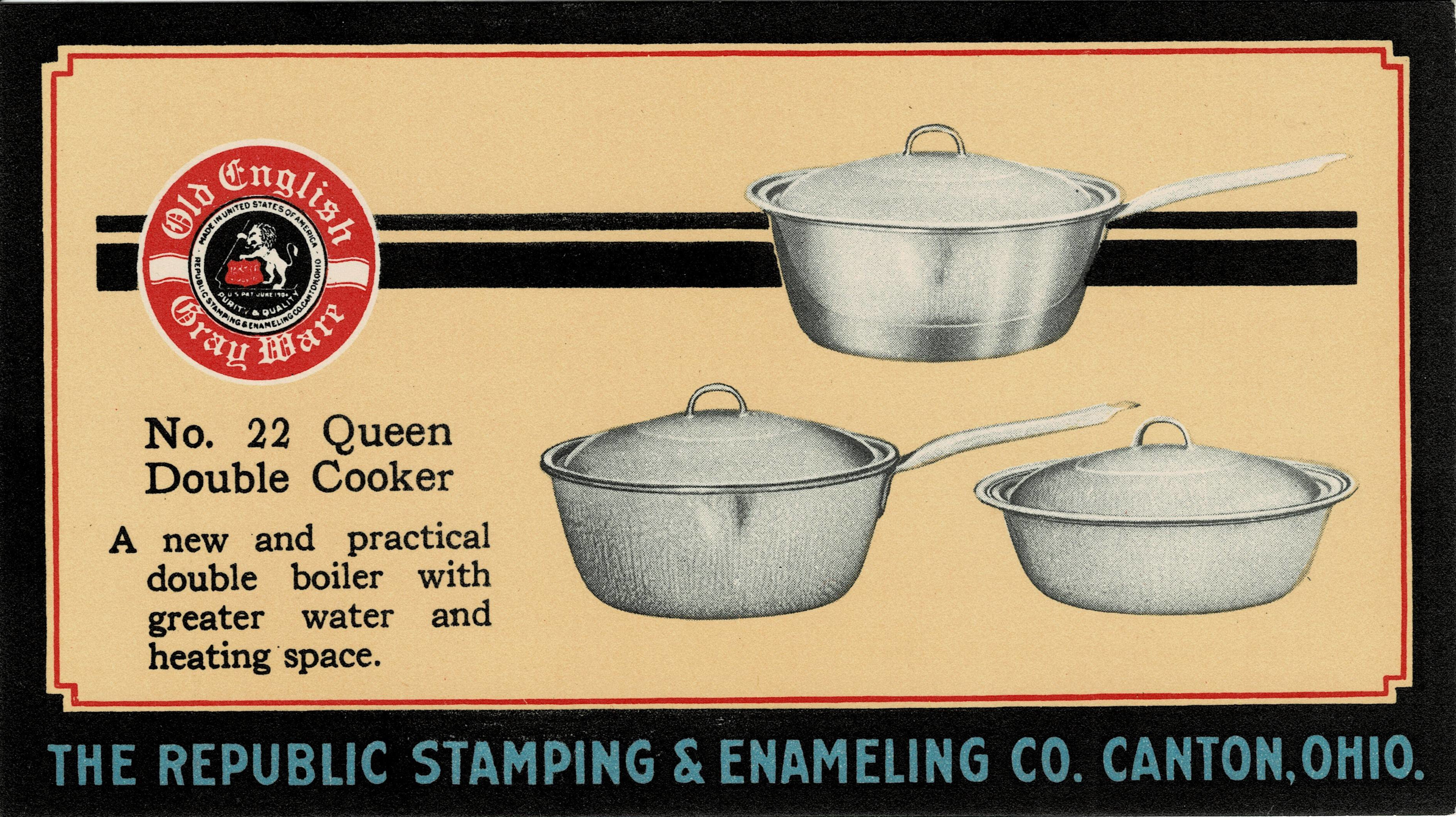
Republic Stamping & Enameling postcard for "Old English Gray Ware", 1922

The Republic Enameling Plant initially employed 300 people at a new facility located along a rail line at the intersection of Harrison Avenue Southwest and Navarre Road. The company enjoyed robust sales shortly after opening and several real estate developments were launched in the area to house workers, many of whom were European immigrants or had relocated from rural areas. In 1915, Republic Stamping acquired the General Stamping Co. of Canton for $1 million, enabling it to increase production to 160,000 pieces of enamelware per day. Republic operated the acquisition as a separate plant on the east side of Canton until closing it two years later and consolidating all production at its main location. In 1918, the company completed the addition of 184,000 square feet of floor space in two new facilities, including a conveyor belt system that eliminated miles of manual hauling by workers daily. By that year, Republic Stamping employed 1,000 people and was devoted to World War I government contracts for hospital and mess utensils. By the 1920s – boosted by tariffs that blunted competition from European manufacturers – the company was shipping pots, pans and other affordable kitchen utensils via rail throughout the country, including under the Old English Gray Ware brand.

Republic continued to refine its production processes, replacing coal with oil to power the facility and improving the grounds around the plant to make them more attractive for workers on lunch breaks. Heavy activity at Republic Stamping plant also led to frequent blockages of Harrison Ave. S.W. as trains waited for loading at the factory. This led to the eventual construction of an underpass at that location.

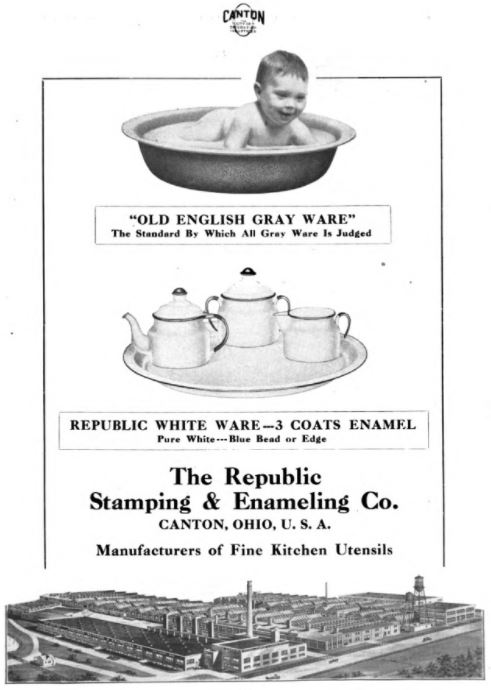
Ad for Gray Ware and White Ware, Circa 1921

The company was headquartered on the seventh floor of the new First National Bank Building in downtown Canton, which opened in 1924.

From the beginning, Republic Stamping employed many women, especially in the dipping department where pans were coated in liquid enamel, a task considered best suited to female manual dexterity. The company was unusual in that it gave employees a Christmas bonus of life insurance equal to their annual salary. Like many other Canton-area employers, Republic Stamping also hosted an annual summer picnic for employees at Myers Lake. Labor relations were generally congenial, although there was a brief wildcat strike in 1933 and a walkout in 1941. Republic was represented by the American Federation of Labor's Council of Fabricated Metal, Dairy Gasoline Utensil & Enamel Workers local of the American Federation of Labor until the United Steelworkers of America became the representative after the company was sold.

== The Second World War and decline ==
During the Second World War, Republic converted to war production and produced canteens, powder cartridges, and other items. In 1944, Republic received the Army-Navy "E" award for excellence in the production of war materials.

Throughout its history, the company had expanded into many product lines ranging from Christmas tree holders to aluminum boxes used to haul bulk products at grocery stores.

However, with consumer tastes and new materials capturing the houseware market, Ecko Products Inc. acquired Republic Stamping and the 400,000-square-foot facility in May 1952. A few months later, Ecko transferred the manufacturing of Ovenex tinware to the Canton plant and dropped enamel production. The plant closed in 1959 with the transfer of housewares production to a sister facility in Massillon. The Canton plant would reopen in 1961. Ecko ceased operations at the Republic site in 1986. The building still stands.

== Photo album ==
Life in the Republic Stamping plant during the mid-1940s is captured in an extensive photo album created by employee Charles Doyne Reese. The 1,400 photos show workers doing their daily tasks plus special events like Christmas parties and the annual summer picnic at Myers Lake.

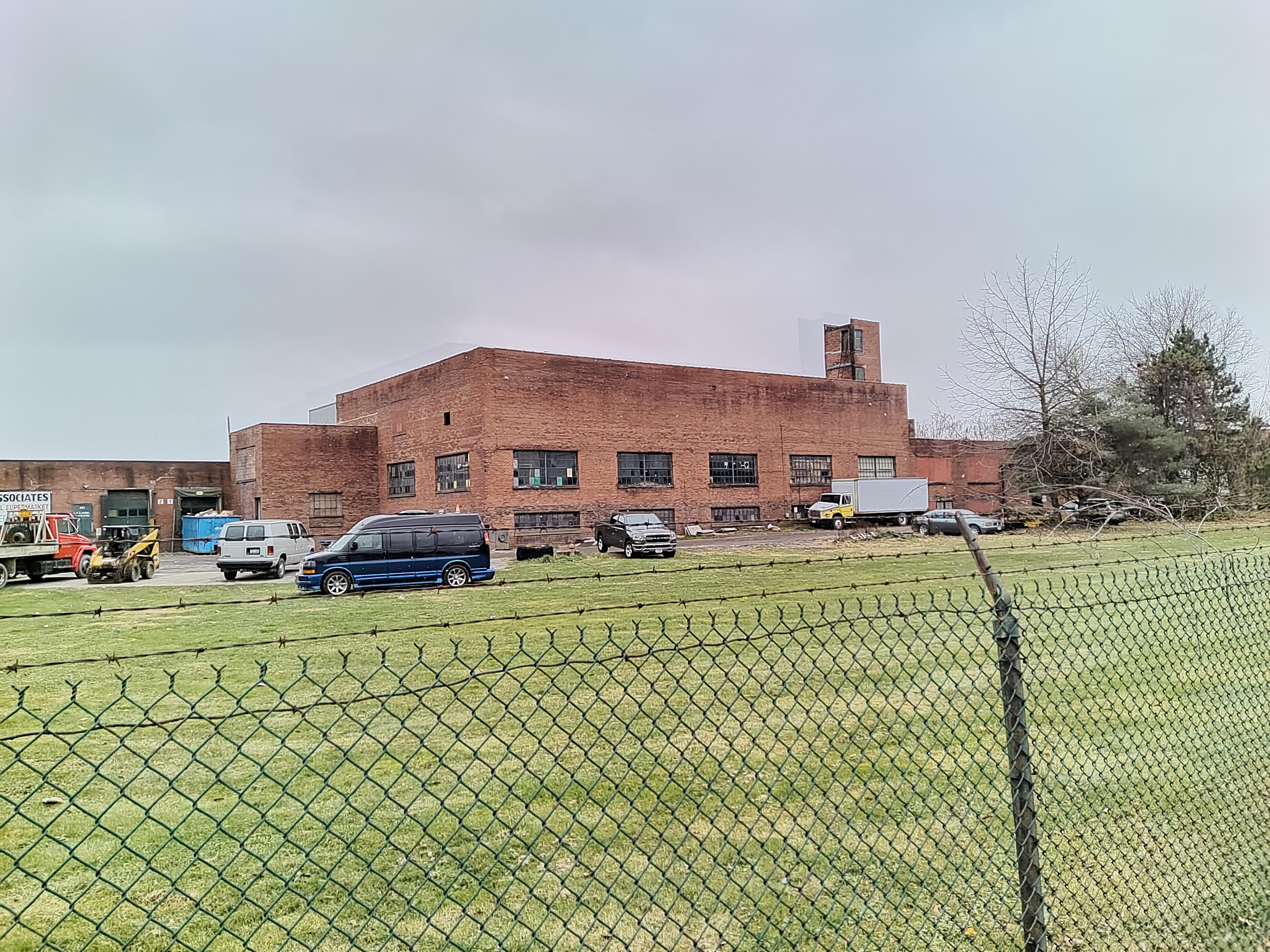
The Republic Stamping and Enameling Site, 2021.

The album is now part of the William McKinley Presidential Library and Museum.
