= Avondale, Ohio =

Avondale, Ohio may refer to:

- Avondale, Cincinnati, Ohio
- Avondale, Stark County, Ohio
