= Dan Dierdorf =

American football player and sportscaster (born 1949)

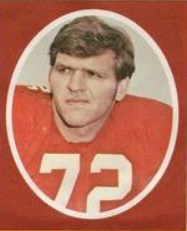
- Dierdorf on a 1972 stamp

No. 72
- Position: Offensive tackle

Personal information
- Born: June 29, 1949 (age 77); Canton, Ohio, U.S.
- Listed height: 6 ft 3 in (1.91 m)
- Listed weight: 275 lb (125 kg)

Career information
- High school: Canton Glenwood (Plain Township, Ohio)
- College: Michigan (1968–1970)
- NFL draft: 1971: 2nd round, 43rd overall pick

Career history
- St. Louis Cardinals (1971–1983)

Awards and highlights
- 5× First-team All-Pro (1975–1978, 1980); Second-team All-Pro (1974); 6× Pro Bowl (1974–1978, 1980); NFL 1970s All-Decade Team; Arizona Cardinals Ring of Honor; Consensus All-America (1970); Second-team All-America (1969); 2× First-team All-Big Ten (1969, 1970); Second-team All-Big Ten (1968)

Career NFL statistics
- Games played: 160
- Games started: 150
- Fumble recoveries: 7
- Stats at Pro Football Reference
- Pro Football Hall of Fame
- College Football Hall of Fame

Daniel Lee Dierdorf (born June 29, 1949) is an American sportscaster and former professional football player. He played 13 seasons (1971–1983) as an offensive tackle for the St. Louis Cardinals of the National Football League (NFL).

Dierdorf played college football for the Michigan Wolverines from 1968 to 1970 and was selected as a consensus All-America in 1970 and a first-team All-Big Ten Conference player in 1969 and 1970. He was inducted into the University of Michigan Athletic Hall of Honor in 1996 and the College Football Hall of Fame in 2000.

Playing in the NFL for St. Louis, he was selected by the National Football League Players Association as the Offensive Lineman of the Year for three consecutive years from 1976 to 1978. Between 1974 and 1980, he played in the Pro Bowl six times and was chosen as a first-team All-Pro five times. He was named to the NFL 1970s All-Decade Team and was inducted into the Pro Football Hall of Fame in 1996.

Since his playing career ended, Dierdorf has worked as a broadcaster. He worked for the American Broadcasting Company (ABC) from 1987 to 1999, including 12 seasons as color analyst on Monday Night Football. He was then part of the NFL on CBS team as an announcer for 15 years from 1999 to 2013. For the 2014 through 2021 seasons, he was the color analyst for Michigan Wolverines football radio broadcasts. In 2008, Dierdorf received the Pete Rozelle Radio-Television Award from the Pro Football Hall of Fame.

== Early life ==
Dierdorf was born in 1949 in Canton, Ohio, the son of John and Evelyn Dierdorf. He grew up near the site of the Pro Football Hall of Fame and watched as a boy as the museum was under construction. His father worked much of his life for the Hoover Vacuum Company, which was headquartered in North Canton. Dierdorf attended Glenwood High School (now known as GlenOak High School) in Canton. He played football and also competed in the discus throw and shot put while in high school. A lightly recruited prospect from Canton, Ohio, Dierdorf looked into a number of Midwestern schools with hopes of landing a football scholarship but did not receive offers from Notre Dame or Michigan State. Ohio State coach Woody Hayes spoke at Dierdorf's high school graduation but didn't think Dierdorf was talented enough to be a Buckeye.

== College career ==
=== 1967 season ===
Dierdorf enrolled at the University of Michigan in 1967, having been recruited by Michigan Wolverines football coach Bump Elliott. He played on both offense and defense for Michigan's all-freshman football team in 1967. As a freshman, he was also the training adversary for NCAA heavyweight wrestling champion Dave Porter.

=== 1968 season ===
As a sophomore, Dierdorf started nine of ten games at the right offensive tackle position for the 1968 Michigan football team that compiled an 8–2 record in Bump Elliott's final season as head coach. Elliott called Dierdorf "without a doubt" his "most active and talented offensive lineman". In Michigan's victory over Wisconsin, Dierdorf played a key role blocking for Ron Johnson as Johnson set an NCAA record with 347 rushing yards and a Big Ten record with five rushing touchdowns. Dierdorf was credited with opening gaping holes on three of Johnson's touchdown runs. Michigan assistant coach Tony Mason said, "He just blew people out of Johnson's way like they weren't even there." Dierdorf received second-team All-Big Ten honors from the Associated Press (AP) in 1968.

Dierdorf sustained a knee injury on the first play of the 1968 Michigan–Ohio State game, and his ability to return to the team remained doubtful until the start of the 1969 season.

=== 1969 season ===
In 1969, Bo Schembechler took over as Michigan's coach and led the 1969 team to a Big Ten Conference championship and a No. 9 ranking in the final AP Poll. Dierdorf started seven games at right offensive tackle and one at left offensive tackle. At six feet, four inches, and 255 pounds, he was the team's strong tackle, switching from one side of the line to the other, so that he could lead the play no matter which way it went. Michigan's 1969 season culminated with a 24–12 upset victory over No. 1 Ohio State. For his performance in the Ohio State game, Dierdorf received the UPI's Lineman of the Week award.

Dierdorf was selected by both the Associated Press (AP) and United Press International (UPI) as a first-team player on the 1969 All-Big Ten Conference football team. He also received second-team All-America honors from the Central Press.

=== 1970 season ===
As a senior, Dierdorf started nine games at right tackle and one at left tackle for the 1970 Michigan team that compiled a 9–1 record. At an October 1970 press luncheon, coach Schembechler opined that Dierdorf was "as good as any tackle in the country" with "good quickness, wonderful strength, smartness, and competitiveness, and he's a great leader." Asking if Dierdorf had any faults, Schembechler paused, then answered his own question: "Faults? Hummmm. He's got big feet and it's hard to fit him into shoes. That's all I can think of." Dierdorf was a consensus first-team pick on the 1970 College Football All-America Team, receiving first-team honors from the American Football Coaches Association, the AP, the Football Writers Association of America, the Newspaper Enterprise Association, and the UPI. He was also picked by both the AP and UPI as a first-team All-Big Ten player, and was picked to play in three post-season all-star games: the East–West Shrine Game, Hula Bowl, and College All-Star Game.

== Professional career ==
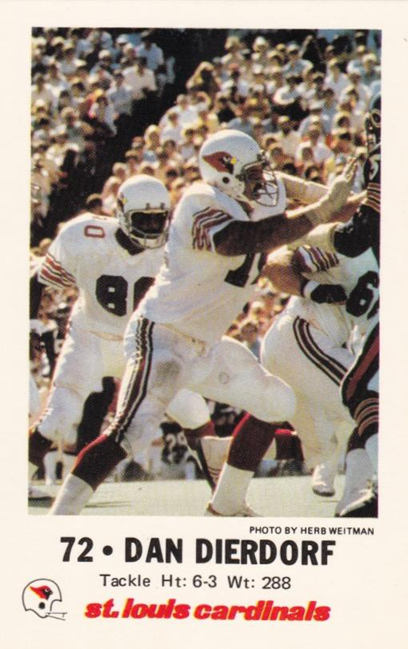
Dierdorf (#72) in 1980 card

=== 1971–1973 ===
Dierdorf was selected by the St. Louis Cardinals in the second round (43rd overall pick) of the 1971 NFL draft. As a rookie in 1971, he appeared in 12 games, six as a starter. During the 1972 and 1973 seasons, Dierdorf became a fixture in the Cardinals' offensive line, starting all 14 games both years. However, the Cardinals continued to struggle, compiling identical 4–9–1 records all three years. Dierdorf played at the offensive guard and offensive tackle positions in 1971 and 1972 before settling in at the offensive tackle in 1973.

=== 1974–1978 ===
From 1974 to 1976, Dierdorf started every game at right tackle for the Cardinals during a three-year span in which the team compiled records of 10–4, 11–3, and 10–4 under head coach Don Coryell. In 1977, Dierdorf sustained a broken jaw and missed two games to injury as the Cardinals fell to 7–7. In 1978, Dierdorf started all 16 games at right tackle for the Cardinals.

During his peak years from 1974 to 1978, Dierdorf was regarded as one of the best offensive linemen in the NFL. He was selected by the National Football League Players Association as the Offensive Lineman of the Year for three consecutive years from 1976 to 1978. The Cardinals' offensive line, led by Dierdorf, Conrad Dobler, and Tom Banks, led the NFL with the fewest sacks allowed for three years (and the National Football Conference for five years) in the mid-1970s. In 1975, the group set an NFL record, allowing only eight sacks in 14 games.

Dierdorf did not allow a sack during the entire 1976 and 1977 seasons. His streak ended in the first game of the 1978 season when Chicago Bears defensive end Tommy Hart tallied two sacks against Dierdorf. Dierdorf had not given up a sack since the 1975 NFC Divisional playoff game when Jack Youngblood sacked Jim Hart.

Dierdorf was selected to play in the Pro Bowl for five consecutive years from 1974 to 1978. Dierdorf also received first-team All-NFL honors as follows: in 1975 from the Pro Football Writers Association (PFWA); in 1976 from the Associated Press (AP), PFWA, Newspaper Enterprise Association (NEA), and Pro Football Weekly (PFW); in 1977 from AP, PFWA, NEA, and PFW; and in 1978 from AP, PFWA, NEA, PFW. He was named as the NFC choice for the NFLPA/Coca-Cola Offensive Lineman of the Year Award three straight years (1976–78) and was the Seagram's Seven Crowns of Sports Offensive Lineman of the Year in 1975. He also won the Forrest Gregg Award for NFL Offensive Lineman of the Year in 1975.

=== 1979–1983 ===
On September 9, 1979, Dierdorf sustained torn ligaments in his left knee during an extra point attempt in the second quarter of the second game of the season against the New York Giants. After the game, Dierdorf said, "The knee was completely out of the socket. It moved a couple of inches off to the side. My leg was all twisted around and my foot was pointing in the wrong direction. It was painful. Very painful." Dierdorf was carried off the field on a stretcher, underwent knee surgery, and missed the remainder of the 1979 season.

Dierdorf returned to the Cardinals in 1980, starting all 16 games for the team at right tackle in both the 1980 and 1981 seasons. In 1980, he was selected to play in the Pro Bowl and was selected as a first-team All-NFL player by the NEA. In 1982, Dierdorf moved to center and was the starter at that position for all nine games in a strike-shortened season.

In 1983, Dierdorf returned to his right tackle position and appeared in seven games, only four as a starter. On October 11, 1983, after the Cardinals began the season with a 1–5 record, Dierdorf announced that he would retire at the end of the 1983 season. At the press conference announcing his retirement, Dierdorf said, "This was an easy decision for me to make. . . . Physically, I just can't play the type of game I want to." He added: "Ninety-five percent of me is sad that I'm retiring, but my knees are very, very happy."

== Broadcasting career ==
=== KMOX and CBS (1984–1986) ===
In January 1984, after retiring as a player, Dierdorf was hired as an afternoon talk show host by KMOX radio in St. Louis. In the fall of 1984, he also worked as a color analyst on radio broadcasts of Missouri Tigers football and St. Louis Cardinals football games. In late 1984, he also added St. Louis Blues hockey broadcasts to his repertoire. In the fall of 1985, Dierdorf was hired by CBS as part of its broadcast team for NFL games. He worked on CBS broadcasts of NFL games in 1985 and 1986.

=== ABC (1987–1999) ===
In April 1987, Dierdorf was hired by ABC to join Al Michaels and Frank Gifford on Monday Night Football broadcasts. He spent 12 seasons on Monday Night Football before resigning the post in early 1999.

During his affiliation with ABC, Dierdorf also served as a blow-by-blow boxing commentator in 1989, beginning with Meldrick Taylor's first defense of his championship, served as a correspondent for the network's coverage of the 1988 Winter Olympics in Calgary, and called play-by-play of some College Football on ABC games in the early 1990s.

=== CBS (1999–2013) ===
In April 1999, Dierdorf signed with CBS and was paired with Verne Lundquist as the network's No. 2 NFL broadcasting team. After week 2 of the 2000 season, Lundquist was moved to CBS' lead college football team, and Dierdorf served as commentator for Dick Enberg from 2000 to 2005. Lundquist would partner up with Dierdorf in week 1 in 2003 and 2005. He also partnered up with Kevin Harlan in week 1 of 2001, Ian Eagle in week 1 of 2002, and Todd Blackledge in week 1 of 2004 while Enberg was covering the US Open tennis on CBS. During the 2006 NFL season, Dierdorf was paired with Greg Gumbel as CBS' No. 2 NFL pairing behind Jim Nantz and Phil Simms. He remained paired with Gumbel for eight seasons from 2006 to 2013.

On November 20, 2013, Dierdorf announced that the 2013 NFL season would be his last as an analyst. "It has become a challenge for me to travel to a different NFL city every week, so it's time to step aside." Dierdorf's final broadcast for CBS was an AFC divisional playoff game on January 11, 2014, between the Indianapolis Colts and New England Patriots.

=== Michigan football (2014–2021) ===
On April 17, 2014, Dierdorf was introduced as the new color analyst for Michigan Wolverines football radio broadcasts. He was paired with former college teammate Jim Brandstatter, who did play-by-play, on Michigan games. Brandstatter was Dierdorf's backup on the offensive line, at strong tackle. Dierdorf and Brandstatter both retired from broadcasting after the 2021 season.

== Honors and recognition ==
In 1994 and 1995, Dierdorf was a finalist for election to the Pro Football Hall of Fame, but he narrowly missed the required 29 votes on both occasions. In January 1996, he received the required vote count and was elected to the Pro Football Hall of Fame.

In addition to his election into the Pro Football Hall of Fame in 1996, other honors for Dierdorf include:

- Dierdorf was named to the University of Michigan Athletic Hall of Honor in October 1996.
- He was inducted into the College Football Hall of Fame in 2000.
- In 2001, Dierdorf was named to the Michigan Sports Hall of Fame.
- In 2002, Dierdorf received a star on the St. Louis Walk of Fame.
- In August 2006, Dierdorf became one of eight charter inductees into the Arizona Cardinals Ring of Honor.
- In 2008, Dierdorf received the Pete Rozelle Radio-Television Award from the Pro Football Hall of Fame. The award was presented to Dierdorf for "longtime exceptional contributions to radio and television in professional football."
- In 2009, Dierdorf was inducted into the inaugural class of the St. Louis Sports Hall of Fame.

== Family and other ventures ==
Dierdorf and his wife, Debbie, continue to live in St. Louis. They have two children: Dana, born c. 1981, and Katie, born c. 1986.

Dierdorf was the co-proprietor, along with former Cardinals quarterback Jim Hart, of Dierdorf and Hart's, a St. Louis steakhouse which closed in 2013 after almost 30 years in business. Dierdorf also is one of the investors of KTRS radio in St. Louis.

== See also ==
- University of Michigan Athletic Hall of Honor
