= PVSA =

PVSA may refer to:

- Passenger Vessel Services Act of 1886
- Pleasant View School for the Arts
- President's Volunteer Service Award
