= Glenoak =

Glenoak could refer to:

- GlenOak High School, a high school located in Canton, Ohio
- Glenoak, California, a fictional city in which the television series 7th Heaven takes place
