= Brian Hartline =

American football player and coach (born 1986)

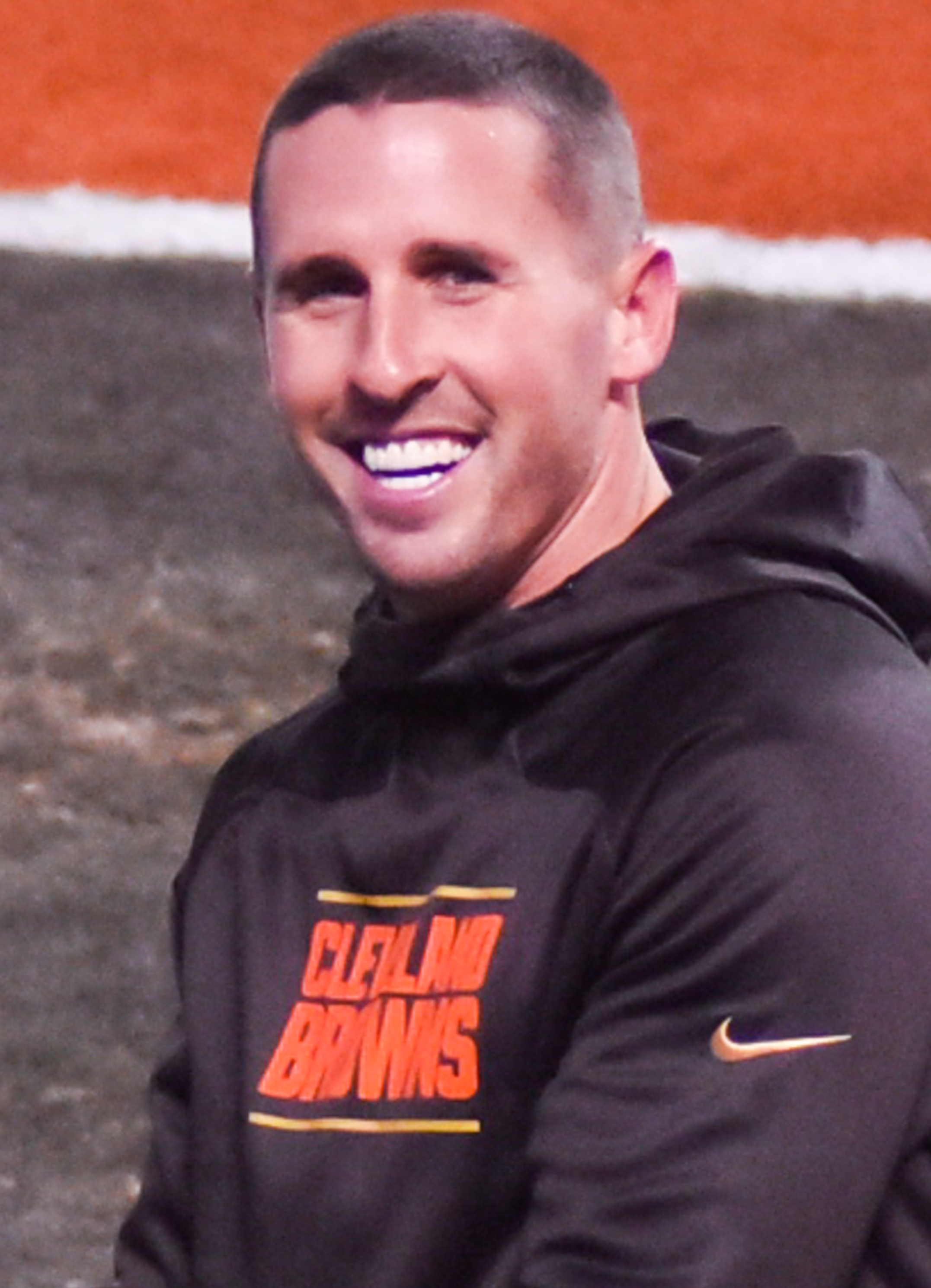
- Hartline in 2015

South Florida Bulls
- Title: Head coach

Personal information
- Born: November 22, 1986 (age 40); Canton, Ohio, U.S.
- Listed height: 6 ft 2 in (1.88 m)
- Listed weight: 200 lb (91 kg)

Career information
- Position: Wide receiver (No. 82, 83)
- High school: GlenOak (Plain Township, Ohio)
- College: Ohio State (2005–2008)
- NFL draft: 2009: 4th round, 108th overall pick

Career history

Playing
- Miami Dolphins (2009–2014); Cleveland Browns (2015)

Coaching
- Ohio State (2017–2025); Offensive quality control assistant (2017); Wide receivers coach (2018–2022); Offensive coordinator & wide receivers coach (2023, 2025); Co-offensive coordinator & wide receivers coach (2024); South Florida (2026–present) Head coach

Awards and highlights
- As an assistant coach: 1 National (2024); 2 Big Ten (2019, 2020)

Career NFL statistics
- Receptions: 344
- Receiving yards: 4,766
- Receiving touchdowns: 14
- Stats at Pro Football Reference

Head coaching record
- Career: NCAA: 6–5 (.545)

Brian Jack Hartline (born November 22, 1986) is an American football coach currently serving as the head coach at the University of South Florida. He previously served as the offensive coordinator and wide receivers coach for Ohio State, his alma mater. He played college football as a wide receiver at Ohio State, and was selected by the Miami Dolphins in the fourth round of the 2009 NFL draft. He was also a member of the Cleveland Browns.

== Early life ==
Hartline attended GlenOak High School in Plain Township, Ohio, where he both played football and ran track for four years. He began his football career as a quarterback, but in the fourth game of his sophomore year, he switched positions to wide receiver.

Hartline was also on the GlenOak track team, and he was the 2005 state champion in the 110 meter hurdles and the 300 meter hurdles.

== College career ==
Hartline redshirted his freshman year, but played in all 13 contests in 2006. In 2007, Hartline played an integral part in getting the Buckeyes to the 2008 BCS National Championship Game, averaging 13.3 yards per reception with 52 catches for 694 yards. In 2008, his final season, Hartline averaged 22.8 yards per reception with 21 catches for 479 yards.

He graduated from Ohio State in June 2009 with a degree in communication, but skipped his final season of eligibility to enter the 2009 NFL draft.

Pre-draft measurables
Height	Weight	Arm length	Hand span	40-yard dash	10-yard split	20-yard split	20-yard shuttle	Three-cone drill	Vertical jump	Broad jump
6 ft 1 5/8 in (1.87 m)	195 lb (88 kg)	32 in (0.81 m)	10 in (0.25 m)	4.58 s	1.63 s	2.70 s	4.12 s	6.65 s	34.5 in (0.88 m)	10 ft 0 in (3.05 m)
All values from NFL Combine

== Professional career ==
=== Miami Dolphins ===
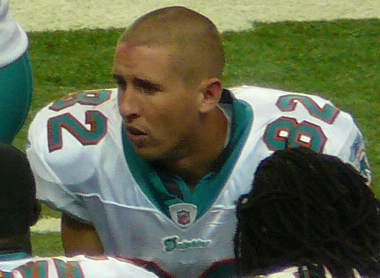
Hartline with the Miami Dolphins in 2009

Hartline was selected by the Miami Dolphins in the fourth round (108th overall) of the 2009 NFL draft. On October 4, 2009, Hartline caught his first career touchdown on a two-yard pass from Chad Henne. Hartline finished his rookie season with 31 receptions, 506 receiving yards, and three touchdown receptions plus a rushing touchdown on a 16-yard play against the Pittsburgh Steelers. Although he finished third on the team in receiving yards, Hartline led the team in receiving touchdowns.

After a solid rookie season in which he played in every game, in the 2010 season, Hartline played only 12 games, but had a better season statistically, with 43 receptions for 615 yards and one touchdown. He also rushed for 27 yards on two carries.

After the release of Ted Ginn Jr. in the 2011 offseason, Hartline cemented his place as a starter, starting every game of the season. He recorded statistics of 549 yards from 35 receptions, thrown by Chad Henne at the start of the season, but after Henne's injury, backup Matt Moore took over.

Despite struggling with injuries and illnesses during the offseason and training camp, Hartline played in the 2012 season opener against the Houston Texans and became the team's number-one receiver with Brandon Marshall's trade. In a Week 4 loss to the Arizona Cardinals, he broke the Dolphins franchise record for receiving yards in a game with 253. He called the record "bittersweet" because his team lost the game. After that Week 4 performance, Hartline led the NFL in receiving yards. Hartline eclipsed 1,000 receiving yards, the eighth receiver in Dolphins history to accomplish the milestone.

During the offseason in 2013, Hartline stayed with the Dolphins, signing a 5-year, $31 million contract, with $12.5 million guaranteed.

Hartline suffered a torn PCL in the last regular season game against the New York Jets in 2013, which forced him to end his season. He led the team in receptions with 76, which is also a career-high, and finished his second consecutive year with over 1,000 receiving yards.

=== Cleveland Browns ===
Hartline signed with the Cleveland Browns on March 9, 2015. On May 23, 2016, Hartline was released by the Browns.

== NFL career statistics ==
Year	Team	Games		Receiving					Rushing					Fumbles	
Year	Team	GP	GS	Rec	Yds	Avg	Lng	TD	Att	Yds	Avg	Lng	TD	Fum	Lost
2009	MIA	16	2	31	506	16.3	67	3	4	29	7.3	16T	1	0	0
2010	MIA	12	11	43	615	14.3	54	1	2	27	13.5	30	0	1	1
2011	MIA	16	10	35	549	15.7	41	1	1	9	9.0	9	0	0	0
2012	MIA	16	15	74	1,083	14.6	80T	1	—	—	—	—	—	1	1
2013	MIA	16	15	76	1,016	13.4	50	4	—	—	—	—	—	0	0
2014	MIA	16	16	39	474	12.2	35	2	—	—	—	—	—	1	0
2015	CLE	12	4	46	523	11.4	41	2	—	—	—	—	—	1	0
Career		104	73	344	4,766	13.9	80	14	7	65	9.3	30	1	4	2

== Coaching career ==
=== Ohio State ===
Hartline joined Ohio State's football team as a graduate assistant in 2017. Already on the coaching staff as a graduate assistant, Hartline was named interim WR coach for Ohio State for the 2018 season after the firing of Zach Smith. The position was made permanent in December 2018. In 2020, Hartline was named to the AFCA "35 Under 35" Leadership Institute which annually recognizes the future leaders in the football coaching profession. In 2020, Hartline was named "National Recruiter of the Year" by 247Sports. On January 9, 2021, Hartline was promoted to passing game coordinator, on top of his title as wide receivers coach. In 2023, he was promoted to offensive coordinator. In 2024, Chip Kelly was named offensive coordinator and Hartline was relegated to co-offensive coordinator. After winning the national championship that season, Kelly took the same position with the Las Vegas Raiders and Hartline was named Ohio State's offensive coordinator again in 2025.

Hartline has been praised for his first-round NFL draft picks, including Garrett Wilson, Emeka Egbuka, Jaxon Smith-Njigba, Chris Olave, Jameson Williams, and Marvin Harrison Jr.

=== South Florida ===
On December 3, 2025, Hartline took his first head coaching position, signing to become head coach at South Florida beginning with the 2026 season. He was allowed to coach Ohio State's offense for the rest of the 2025 season as the Buckeyes were competing in the College Football Playoff.

== Personal life ==
Hartline's younger brother, Mike Hartline, is a former quarterback for the Indianapolis Colts and New England Patriots, and is currently the quarterbacks coach at the University of South Florida. Hartline and his wife, Kara, have three young children: sons Brayden and Kameron, and a daughter, Brooklyn.

Hartline owns and operates two convenience stores with a partner in Columbus, where he works during the offseason.

On April 16, 2023, Hartline was hospitalized with non-life threatening injuries due to an ATV accident.

== Head coaching record ==
Year	Team	Overall	Conference	Standing	Bowl/playoffs	AP^{#}	Coaches^{°}
South Florida Bulls (American Conference) (2026–present)
2026	South Florida	6–5	2–5				
South Florida:		6–5	2–5				
Total:		6–5					
National championship Conference title Conference division title or championship game berth
^{†}Indicates CFP / New Years' Six bowl.; ^{#}Rankings from final Coaches Poll.; ^{°}Rankings from final AP Poll.
