= Killing of Ashley Zhao =

2017 fatal beating of a 5-year-old girl in Ohio

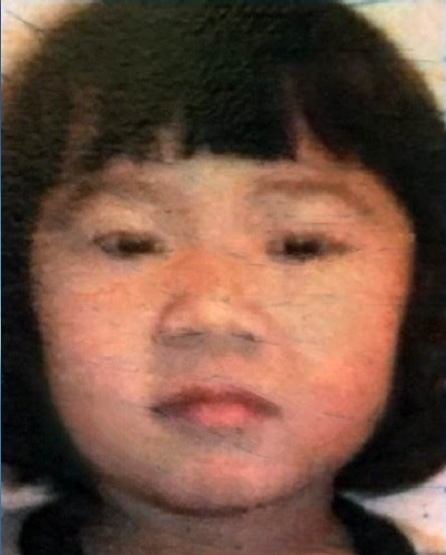
- Photo of Ashley Zhao released by police to ask for public help in searching for her
- Location: Jackson Township, Ohio, U.S.
- Date: January 9, 2017; 9 years ago
- Attack type: Child homicide by beating, filicide
- Victims: Ashley Zhao, aged 5
- Perpetrators: Ming Ming Chen (mother); Liang Zhao (father)
- Motive: Rage, resentment
- Verdict: Pleaded guilty
- Convictions: Chen: Involuntary manslaughter (Note: Both Chen and Zhao were initially both charged with murder, but those charges were dropped in plea deals.) Chen and Zhao: Gross abuse of a corpse; Obstructing justice; Tampering with evidence; Endangering children (Note: Two counts for Zhao.)
- Sentence: Chen: 22 years in prison, plus deportation following release Zhao: 12 years in prison

Ashley Zhao (December 30, 2011 – January 9, 2017) was a 5-year-old Chinese American girl who was discovered dead in her family's restaurant in Jackson Township, Stark County, Ohio, U.S., on January 10, 2017. Her death sparked an investigation led by the local police department in cooperation with the Ohio Bureau of Criminal Investigation and the Federal Bureau of Investigation.

Ming Ming Chen (born 1987/1988), Ashley's mother, was charged with her death and convicted of involuntary manslaughter. Ashley's father, Liang Zhao, was also tried and found guilty of obstructing justice and corpse abuse for assisting Chen in hiding the body. Chen and Zhao were sentenced to 22 and 12 years in prison respectively.

== Missing persons report and discovery of body ==
On January 9, 2017, Ashley Zhao disappeared from Ang's Asian Cuisine, a restaurant owned by her parents. She was reported missing on the same day at around 9:00 PM. Her parents told the police that she may have "wandered out a back door".

On the morning of January 10, authorities issued a Statewide Endangered Child Alert for her.

On January 11, while searching the restaurant, police found her corpse "concealed" in the kitchen, close to the freezer.

== Investigation and legal proceedings ==
Chen and Zhao were arrested for their daughter's death on January 11; at the Massillon Municipal Court, their bonds were set at $5 million each because the judge believed that they posed a flight risk. Although her parents had reported her missing, the police believed that Chen had repeatedly punched Ashley in the face until she died.

=== Ming Ming Chen ===
Charged with murder and felonious assault, Ming Ming Chen confessed to police during an interrogation to beating Ashley to death. She talked about how she was exhausted by working at the restaurant and that Ashley had become disobedient. After informing her husband that Ashley was dead, she tasked him with hiding the body.

On October 12, 2017, Chen pleaded not guilty to the murder charge by reason of insanity.

On December 29, 2017, after she pleaded guilty to involuntary manslaughter, she was sentenced to 22 years in prison. As she had come to the United States illegally when she was a teenager, she will be deported back to China after being released from prison.

=== Liang Zhao ===
As part of a plea deal, Zhao, a U.S. citizen, agreed to testify against Ming Ming Chen in exchange for a sentence of 12 years in prison.

According to Zhao, when he found Ashley, she was lying on the floor with head injuries (that Chen presumably inflicted) and "green fluid" coming out of her mouth. He took her to the bathroom to clean the fluid off her face; by that point she had stopped breathing. He tried to perform CPR, but did not successfully revive her. He also confessed to helping Chen hide Ashley's body in the restaurant following her death. On September 11, 2017, he pleaded guilty to two counts of child endangerment, corpse abuse, obstruction of justice, and evidence tampering. He was sentenced to 12 years in prison on January 10, 2018.

== Memorials ==
On January 17, 2017, hundreds of mourners gathered outside the restaurant and set up a memorial.
