= Avondale, Stark County, Ohio =

Unincorporated community in Ohio, U.S.

Coordinates: 40°49′35″N 81°24′51″W

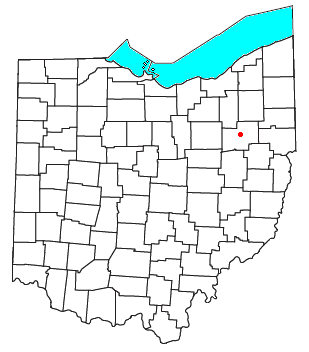
Location of Avondale in Stark County, Ohio

Avondale is an unincorporated community in southwestern Plain Township, Stark County, Ohio, United States. Located just northwest of Canton and north of Meyers Lake, its altitude is 1,135 feet (346 m).

The community is part of the Canton–Massillon Metropolitan Statistical Area.

== Parks ==
- Avondale Arboretum
- Arboretum-Spiker Park

== Education ==
- Avondale elementary school (Plain local schools)

=== Schools Right Outside the limits ===
- Taft elementary school (Plain local schools)
- Canton Country Day School (Private)
