= Hills and Dales, Ohio =

- Village
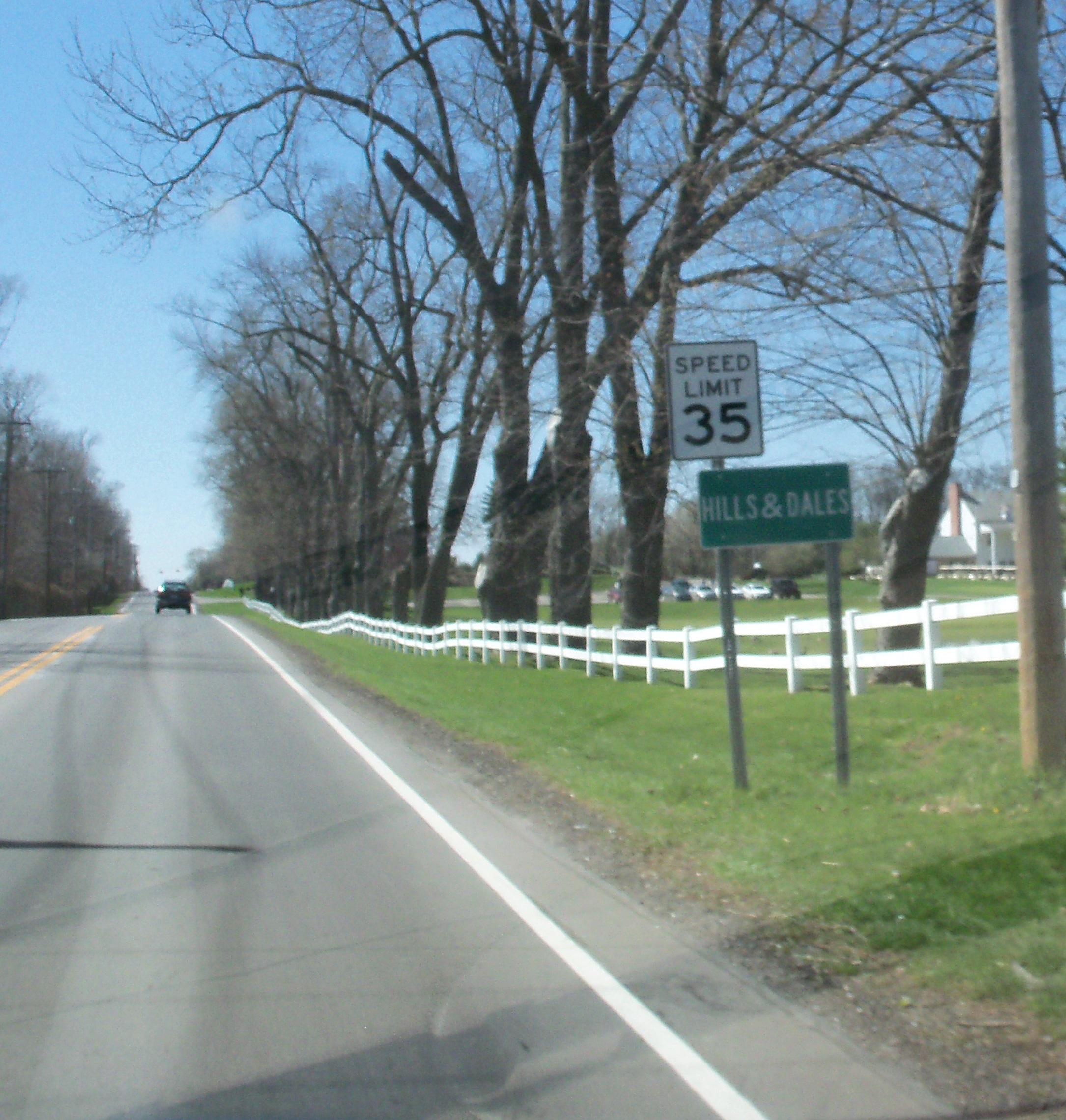
- Entering the village

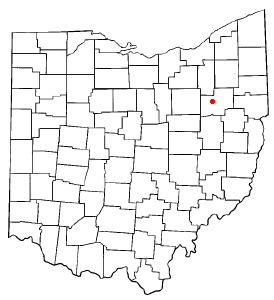
- Location of Hills and Dales, Ohio

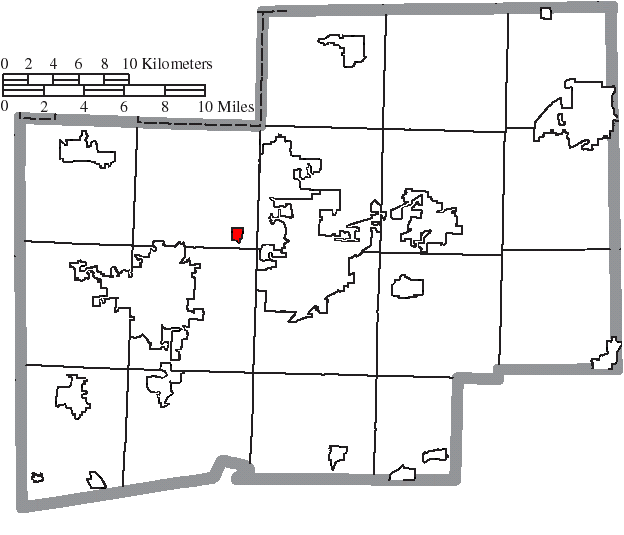
- Location of Hills and Dales in Stark County
- Coordinates: 40°49′45″N 81°26′38″W
- Country: United States
- State: Ohio
- County: Stark
- Township: Jackson

Area
  - Total: 0.31 sq mi (0.80 km^{2})
  - Land: 0.31 sq mi (0.80 km^{2})
  - Water: 0 sq mi (0.00 km^{2})
- Elevation: 1,096 ft (334 m)

Population (2020)
  - Total: 250
  - Estimate (2023): 245
  - Density: 805.3/sq mi (310.93/km^{2})
- Time zone: UTC-5 (Eastern (EST))
  - Summer (DST): UTC-4 (EDT)
- ZIP code: 44708
- Area code: 330
- FIPS code: 39-35532
- GNIS feature ID: 2398507

Hills and Dales is a village in central Stark County, Ohio, United States. It is a suburban enclave near Canton. Hills and Dales is part of the Canton–Massillon metropolitan area. The population was 250 at the 2020 census.

The name Hills and Dales was coined by property developers for the terrain of the town site.

== Geography ==
According to the United States Census Bureau, the village has a total area of 0.32 square miles (0.83 km^{2}), all land.

== Demographics ==
Historical population
Census	Pop.	Note	%±
1930	84		—
1940	98		16.7%
1950	125		27.6%
1960	320		156.0%
1970	280		−12.5%
1980	281		0.4%
1990	297		5.7%
2000	260		−12.5%
2010	221		−15.0%
2020	250		13.1%
2023 (est.)	245	▼	−2.0%
U.S. Decennial Census

=== 2010 census ===
As of the census of 2010, there were 221 people, 97 households, and 67 families living in the village. The population density was 690.6 inhabitants per square mile (266.6/km^{2}). There were 113 housing units at an average density of 353.1 per square mile (136.3/km^{2}). The racial makeup of the village was 92.8% White, 6.3% Asian, and 0.9% from two or more races. Hispanic or Latino of any race were 2.7% of the population.

There were 97 households, of which 18.6% had children under the age of 18 living with them, 63.9% were married couples living together, 4.1% had a female householder with no husband present, 1.0% had a male householder with no wife present, and 30.9% were non-families. 24.7% of all households were made up of individuals, and 12.4% had someone living alone who was 65 years of age or older. The average household size was 2.28 and the average family size was 2.75.

The median age in the village was 56.4 years. 16.7% of residents were under the age of 18; 5.1% were between the ages of 18 and 24; 11.8% were from 25 to 44; 35.8% were from 45 to 64; and 30.8% were 65 years of age or older. The gender makeup of the village was 52.0% male and 48.0% female.

=== 2000 census ===
As of the census of 2000, there were 260 people, 107 households, and 86 families living in the village. The population density was 809.8 inhabitants per square mile (312.7/km^{2}). There were 115 housing units at an average density of 358.2 per square mile (138.3/km^{2}). The racial makeup of the village was 250 Whites, one African American, eight Asian Americans, two Hispanics and one mixed race resident.

There were 107 households, out of which 25.2% had children under the age of 18 living with them, 73.8% were married couples living together, 4.7% had a female householder with no husband present, and 18.7% were non-families. 16.8% of all households were made up of individuals, and 12.1% had someone living alone who was 65 years of age or older. The average household size was 2.43 and the average family size was 2.72.

In the village, the population was spread out, with 20.4% under the age of 18, 1.9% from 18 to 24, 16.5% from 25 to 44, 40.8% from 45 to 64, and 20.4% who were 65 years of age or older. The median age was 51 years. For every 100 females there were 88.4 males. For every 100 females age 18 and over, there were 88.2 males.

The median income for a household in the village was $108,257, and the median income for a family was $120,559. Males had a median income of $100,000 versus $39,167 for females. The per capita income for the village was $65,910. About 3.4% of families and 3.4% of the population were below the poverty line, including 6.6% of those under the age of eighteen and 4.4% of those 65 or over.

== Education ==
Hills and Dales is covered by the Plain local school district. Avondale Elementary is the closest elementary school and serves the village of Hills and Dales.
