= Jackson Bog State Nature Preserve =

Protected area in Ohio, United States

Jackson Bog
- Jackson Bog State Nature Preserve
- Location within Ohio Location within the United States
- Location: Jackson Township, Ohio
- Nearest city: Massillon
- Coordinates: 40.85847°N 81.50341°W
- Area: 58 acres (23 ha)
- Established: 1980
- Governing body: Jackson Township Local Board of Education and the Ohio Division of Natural Areas and Preserves
- Website: naturepreserves.ohiodnr.gov/jacksonbog

Jackson Bog, or Jackson Bog State Nature Preserve, is a 58 acres (23 ha) State Nature Preserve in northern Stark County, Jackson Township, near the city of Massillon, Ohio. It is owned by the Jackson Township Local Board of Education and the Ohio Division of Natural Areas and Preserves.

The bog, which is a fen, or alkaline bog, lies at the foot of a dry, sandy kame. The belts of kames in this area of Stark County provide an extensive aquifer. These highly permeable gravel deposits readily absorb surface water and then hold it in staggering quantities as groundwater. Whenever this groundwater reaches the surface, artesian springs and seeps result. Springs emerge from beneath the elongated kame that borders the northern edge of the preserve. The best time to visit the park is in summer, when the bog's populations of flowering and carnivorous plants are in bloom. Also, the bog supports over 20 plants that are listed as rare in the state of Ohio.
