= Marchand, Ohio =

Unincorporated community in Ohio, U.S.

Coordinates: 40°52′52″N 81°25′42″W

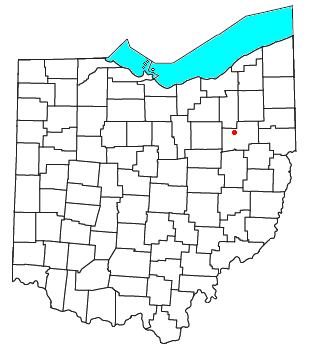
Location of Marchand, Ohio

Marchand is an unincorporated community in northeastern Jackson Township, Stark County, Ohio, United States, a short distance west of North Canton. Marchand is a historical locality that contains very few businesses, surrounded by the B.& O. Railroad tracks.

== History ==
Joseph Francis Marchand, first child of Francis and Mary (Friez) Marchand, was born in Boron, France, March 15, 1825. He was three years old when he, along with his parents, immigrated to America. He married Catherine Pierson on June 6, 1847, at St. Peter's Catholic Church in Canton, Ohio. Catherine was born September 1, 1829, in Ohio. Her parents Peter and Catherine Pierson, French born, immigrated to America a month after the Marchands had arrived. Joseph was pioneer in Ohio and founded the village of Marchand. He was an enterprising man, who worked in agriculture, was a businessman and an investor. He purchased property when given the opportunity and erected three houses in the village of Marchand, one of which was used as a hotel and another as a saloon. He operated a small store in the third of the houses, creating competition for the general store across the street. He built a grain elevator, buying grain from farmers. A post office was opened in Marchand on December 22, 1881, and closed on October 14, 1916; mail formerly sent to the Marchand post office was redirected to the New Berlin post office, now North Canton.
