= Middlebranch, Ohio =

- CDP
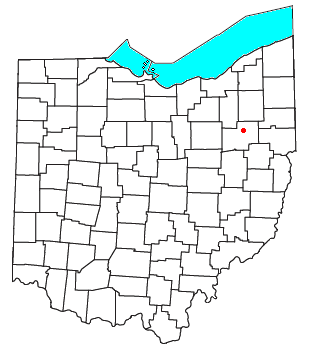
- Location of Middlebranch, Ohio
- Coordinates: 40°53′49″N 81°19′56″W
- Country: United States
- State: Ohio
- County: Stark
- Township: Plain

Area
  - Total: 0.84 sq mi (2.18 km^{2})
- Elevation: 1,119 ft (341 m)

Population (2020)
  - Total: 2,117
- Time zone: UTC-5 (Eastern (EST))
  - Summer (DST): UTC-4 (EDT)
- ZIP code: 44652
- GNIS feature ID: 2812839

Middlebranch is a census-designated place in northeastern Plain Township, Stark County, Ohio, United States. It is located about 7 miles Northeast of Canton. It has a post office with the ZIP code 44652. The community is part of the Canton–Massillon Metropolitan Statistical Area. The population was 2,117 at the 2020 census. Trains from the Wheeling and Lake Erie Railway often run through the area carrying loads of scrap metal bound for other Ohio cities.

== History ==
A post office called Middle Branch was established in 1844, and the name was changed to Middlebranch in 1893. The community takes its name from the nearby Middle Branch Nimishillen Creek.

== Middlebranch School ==
Middlebranch elementary school in the Plain local school district. The school functioned as the district's first high school from 1926 to 1957. After that it became a middle school until the 2006-07 school year when it became an elementary school.

== Also ==
- Plain township, Stark County
