= Jackson Township, Stark County, Ohio =

Township in Ohio, US

- Township
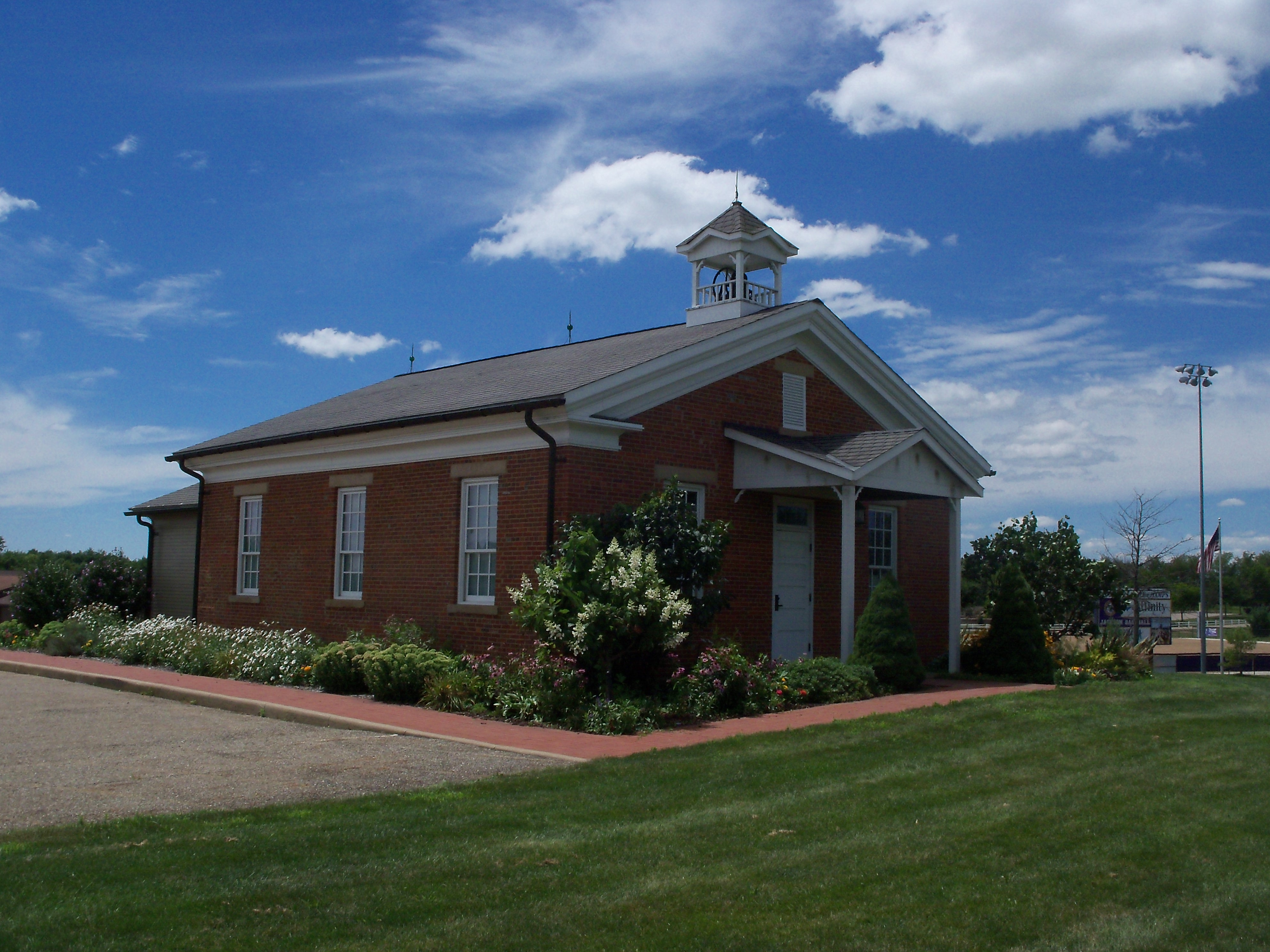
- Jackson Center one-room school now houses the Historical Society.

- Flag Seal

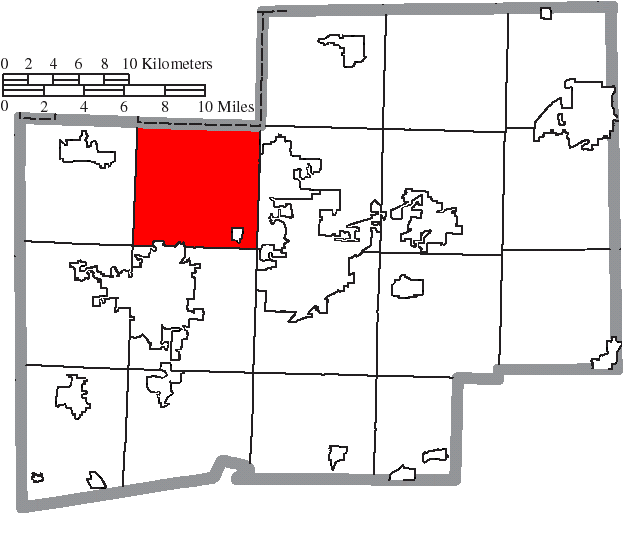
- Location of Jackson Township in Stark County
- Coordinates: 40°51′25″N 81°28′33″W
- Country: United States
- State: Ohio
- County: Stark

Area
  - Total: 37.1 sq mi (96.1 km^{2})
  - Land: 36.5 sq mi (94.6 km^{2})
  - Water: 0.62 sq mi (1.6 km^{2})
- Elevation: 1,112 ft (339 m)

Population (2020)
  - Total: 43,067
  - Density: 1,179/sq mi (455.3/km^{2})
- Time zone: UTC-5 (Eastern (EST))
  - Summer (DST): UTC-4 (EDT)
- FIPS code: 39-38094
- GNIS feature ID: 1086976
- Website: jacksontwp.com

Jackson Township is one of the 17 townships of Stark County, Ohio, United States. The 2020 census found 43,067 people in the township.

== Geography ==
Located in the northwestern part of the county, it borders the following townships and cities:

- Green - north
- Lake Township - northeast corner
- Plain Township - northeast corner
- North Canton - east
- Canton Township - southeast corner
- Perry Township - south
- Massillon - south
- Tuscarawas Township - southwest corner
- Lawrence Township - west
- New Franklin - northwest corner
- Hills and Dales - enclave

Three municipalities are located in Jackson Township: a small part of the city of Massillon in the southwest, a very small portion of the city of North Canton in the northeast, and the village of Hills and Dales in the southeast. The unincorporated community of Marchand lies in the township's northeast.

== Name and history ==
Stark County's Jackson Township was named for Andrew Jackson, a major general in the War of 1812 and later the seventh President of the United States (1829–1837), who was at the height of his popularity in 1815 when the Township was formed. It is one of 37 Jackson townships statewide.

In 1833, Jackson Township contained three gristmills and two saw mills.

== Government ==
The township is governed by a three-member board of trustees, who are elected in November of odd-numbered years to a four-year term beginning on the following January 1. Two are elected in the year after the presidential election and one is elected in the year before it. There is also an elected township fiscal officer, who serves a four-year term beginning on April 1 of the year after the election, which is held in November of the year before the presidential election. Vacancies in the fiscal office or on the board of trustees are filled by the remaining trustees. Currently, the board is composed of Chairman Todd J. Hawke, Vice-Chairman John E. Pizzino and Trustee Justin B. Hardesty, and Fiscal Officer Kody Gonzalez.

The township's motto is "We make things happen."

== Education ==
Public education in nearly all of Jackson Township is provided by Jackson Local Schools, of which Chris DiLoreto has been the superintendent since 2011. This district is made up of four elementary schools: Sauder, Amherst, Lake Cable, and Strausser; one middle school (Jackson Memorial Middle School); and one high school. Jackson High School underwent a significant renovation in 2007. The district was given a grade of 5 (significantly exceeds state standards) by the state of Ohio in 2024.

A small section in the southeastern corner of Jackson Township is served by the Plain Local School District. The village of Hills and Dales is also served by that district.

Jackson Township has a public library, a branch of Stark County District Library.

== Points of interest ==
- Jackson Bog State Nature Preserve
- Jackson Amphitheater
- Jackson High School
- Lake Cable
- Robert Fife Stadium
