= Pleasant View School for the Arts =

Location
- 3000 Columbus Rd. Canton, Ohio; USA; 40.839°N 81.3314°W

Information
- Type: Magnet School
- Motto: Euthalomenichore
- Established: Built early 20th century, became PVSA 1987
- Closed: 2007
- Grades: 4–8
- Enrollment: 313, formerly
- Campus: Suburban
- Colors: maroon and beige, later green and gold
- Mascot: Golden Eagles

Pleasant View School for the Arts, frequently referred to as PVSA or simply PV, was a co-educational public magnet school dedicated to the arts in the Plain Local School District in Canton, Ohio. Students from the district's 5 elementary schools were invited to "identify" for the school in the 3rd grade. This identification process had students demonstrate their abilities in the four designated Arts: Dance, Music, Drama, and Visual Art. The school accepted an average of 80 students per year, spanning the 4th–8th grade, though it was technically identified as a middle school.

== Kaleidoscope ==
Kaleidoscope was the school's gifted education program. It accepted an initial class of about 15 students per year, based on district-wide scores on the California Achievement Test, admitting 2–3 more students per year as vacancies allowed. Students accepted were in the 99th percentile of test takers.

== Closing ==
When the district restructured in 2006, Pleasant View School for the Arts was closed. The district claims to be integrating the programs offered at PVSA into the new middle schools, Glenwood and Oakwood.

The building, which was in notorious disrepair during its later years, was bulldozed in 2007, and the former location, 3000 Columbus Ave., is now an empty lot.
