= Plain Local School District =

School district in Ohio, United States

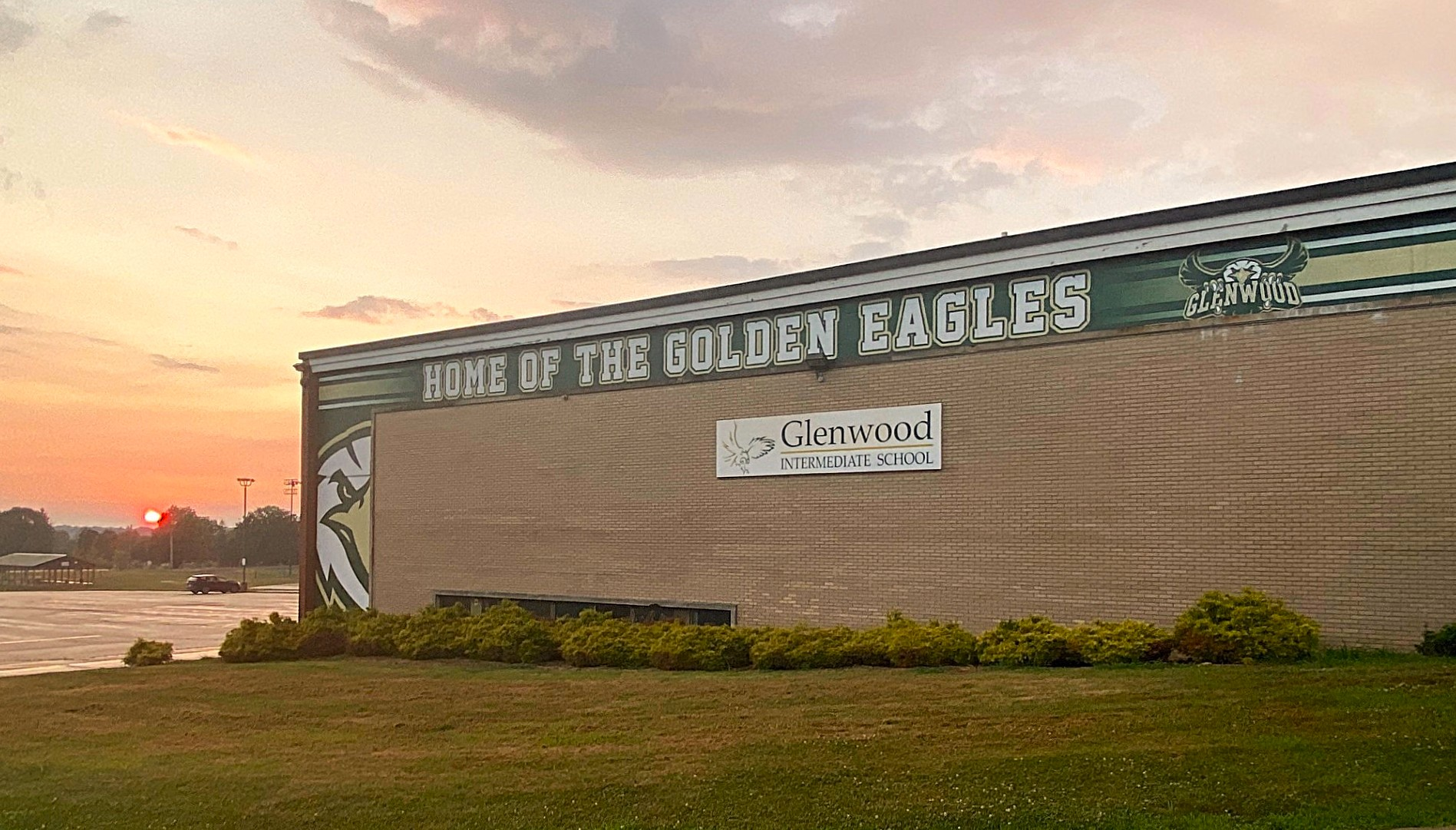

Location
- Plain Township, Ohio Midwest United States

District information
- Type: Public-suburban/urban
- Motto: "What's your why"
- Grades: K–12
- Established: 1914
- Superintendent: Brent May
- Schools: 9

Students and staff
- Students: 6,100
- Teachers: about 450
- Staff: 508
- Athletic conference: Federal League
- District mascot: Ernie the Eagle
- Colors: Forest green and Vegas gold

Other information
- Website: www.plainlocal.org

Plain Local School District is a public school district located in Plain Township, Stark County, Ohio, United States. The district educates approximately 6,100 students K–12.

In addition to Plain Township the district also serves parts of the cities of Canton and North Canton, parts of Jackson, Lake and Nimishillen townships, and the village of Hills and Dales. It also includes the census-designated place of Middlebranch.

The district operates six elementary schools, two middle schools, and one high school, GlenOak High School.

== Schools ==
=== Elementary (K-4) ===
- Avondale
- Barr
- Frazer
- Middlebranch
- Taft
- Warstler

=== Middle (5-6, 7-8) ===
- Glenwood Intermediate School (5–6)
- Oakwood Middle School (7–8)

=== High School (9-12) ===
- GlenOak

=== Former schools ===
- Edgefield Grade School: Was one the original elementary schools for the district and was later closed in 1994 when the SCESC bought the building. In the late 2010s the building was mostly demolished because it was no longer needed.
- Day Elementary School: Was a K-5 elementary until 2006, later becoming one of the two kindergarten centers for the district. In 2011 it was chosen to close the kindergarten centers and move them to the 6 elementary schools. The building is now home to Day Integrated Learning Center for the Stark County ESC.
- Plain Center Elementary: Was another K-5 elementary until 2006 when it became of the other kindergarten center in the district. In 2011 the district chose to close the building along with Day and move kindergarten to the 6 elementary schools. The school has now been leased to Portage Collaborative Montessori School for classes.
- Pleasant View School for the Arts: Originally Pleasant View Elementary before becoming a school for the arts a time later. Closed when the district reconstructed and the classes the school offered were moved to the new middle schools (Glenwood & Oakwood). The building was demolished in 2007 and the land is still vacant.

== Controversies ==
In early 2012, Plain Local District phased out its logo after Morehead State University claimed that the district had illegally used its logo.

Superintendent Brent May says the district removed the logo from its website, fliers and other correspondence. The website now features an outline of an eagle with its wings raised; however, the stolen eagle image also is featured on the GlenOak High School gymnasium floor, which would be costly to change.

The attorney representing the university's interests says he understands that financial burden and would ask that the logo be changed whenever the school replaces the gym floor.
