= Meyers Lake (Wisconsin) =

Lake in the state of Wisconsin, United States

- Lake Meyers
- Location within Wisconsin Location within the United States
- Location: Portage County, Wisconsin
- Coordinates: 44°28′40″N 89°17′25″W
- Type: lake
- Basin countries: United States
- Surface elevation: 1,047 ft (319 m)

Meyers Lake is a lake in the U.S. state of Wisconsin.

A variant name is "Lake Meyers". The lake's name most likely is a corruption of the last name of Monroe Moyers, an early settler.
