= GlenOak High School =

Coordinates: 40°52′09″N 81°21′00″W

Glen Oak High School
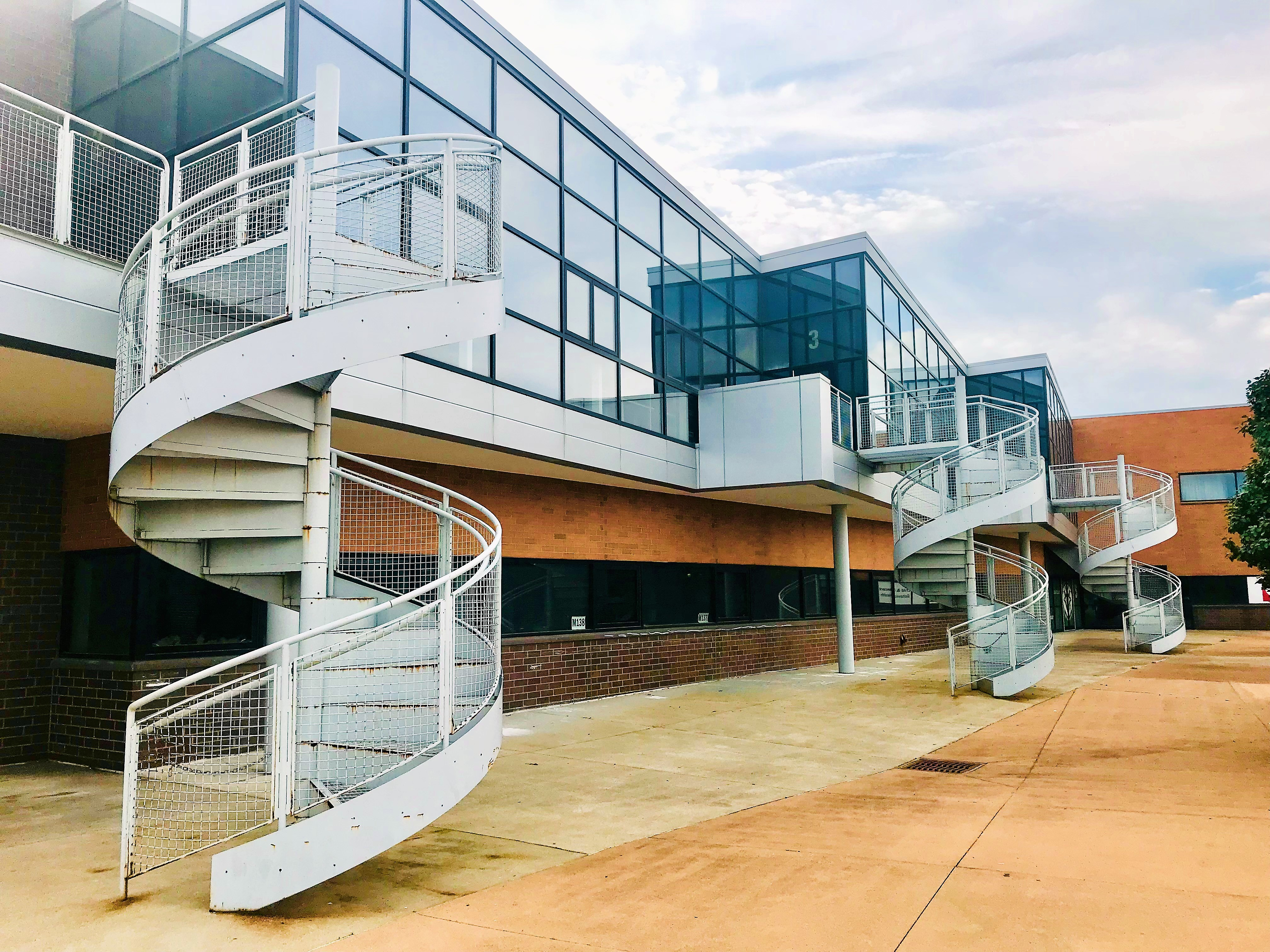
- GlenOak High School spiral staircases

Location
- 1801 Schneider Street NE; Canton, Ohio 44721; United States

Information
- Type: Public, Coeducational high school
- Opened: 2006
- School district: Plain Local School District
- Superintendent: Brent May
- Principal: Brett Niarchos
- Teaching staff: 90.89 (FTE)
- Grades: 9-12
- Enrollment: 2,114 (2023-2024)
- Student to teacher ratio: 23.26
- Campus size: Medium
- Colors: Forest green & Vegas gold
- Athletics conference: Federal League
- Mascot: Ernie the Eagle
- Team name: Golden Eagles
- Newspaper: The Eagle
- Yearbook: Aurum
- Athletic Director: Scott Garcia
- Head Educational Secretary: Alison Ryder Pickering
- Website: https://glenoak.plainlocal.org/

GlenOak High School is a public high school in Plain Township, Ohio, United States, near Canton. It is the only high school in the Plain Local School District. Sports teams are called the Golden Eagles, and they compete in the Ohio High School Athletic Association as a member of the Federal League.

== Campus ==
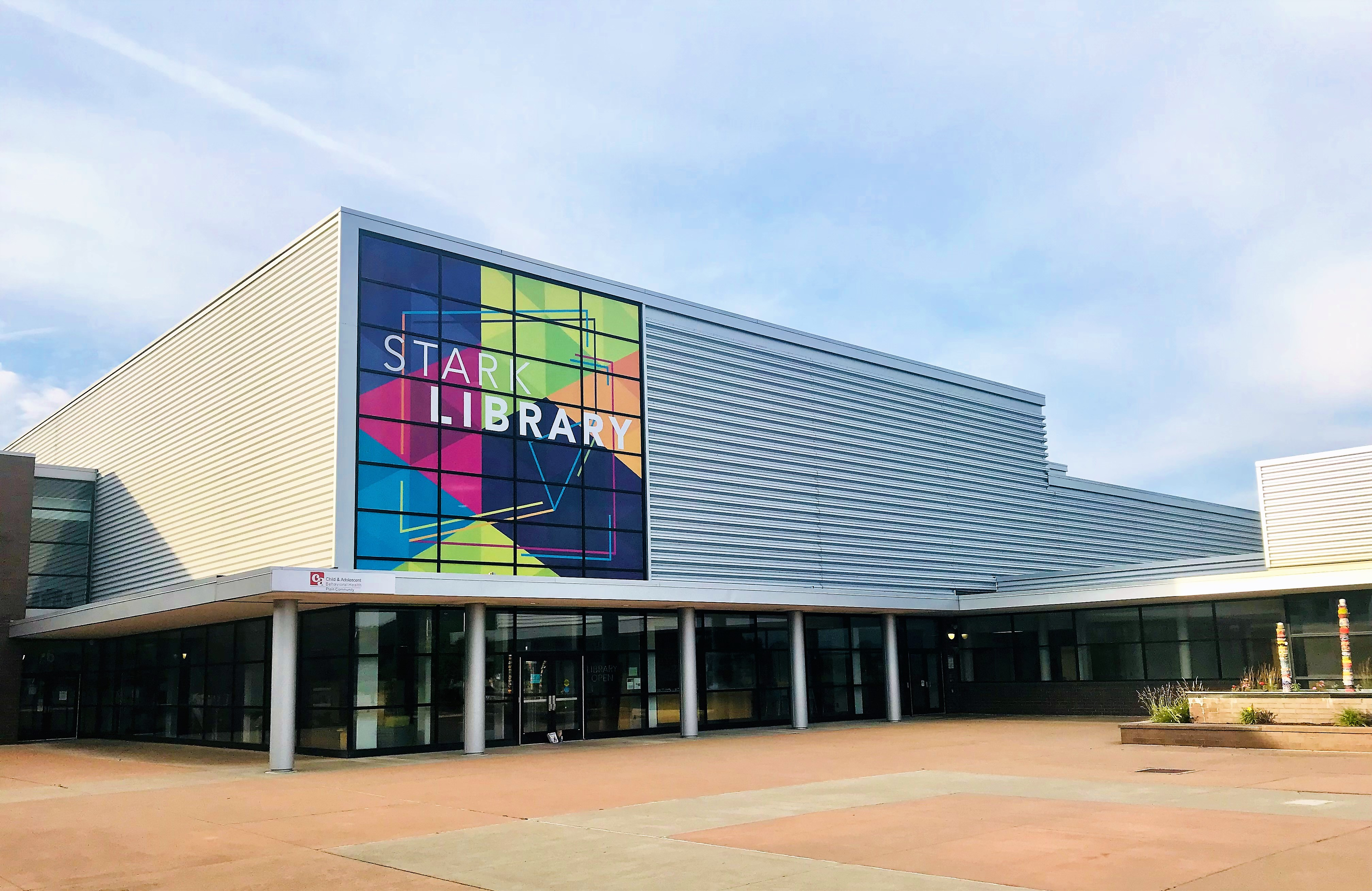
Public library attached to school

Plain Local finished construction of the new GlenOak Community Campus for the 2006–2007 school year, a high school with a public library situated within the building. Designed by architects Perkins+Will, it incorporates an 'academy' design. Seven academies are within the school, as following:

- 9th Grade Academy
- Arts and Communication Academy
- Business and Marketing Academy
- Environmental Sciences Academy
- Health Sciences Academy
- Human Services Academy
- Industrial and Engineering Academy
- Freshman Arts Program

The Community Campus includes an incorporated public library, a video studio, a 900-seat theater with balcony, and a blackbox. It also sports two gymnasiums, the main gym and a smaller auxiliary gym, softball and baseball fields and a new multi-purpose stadium with Field Turf, named "Bob Commings Field" along with another turf field used for the freshman football team or other events when "Bob Commings Field" is already being used. The stadium enhancements are being funded privately through community support. Design of permanent facilities within the stadium were completed in 2008 and an outdoor learning lab is being built near the main retention pond. An adjacent property was bought by Plain Township to be converted to a park, and walking trails from the park will wind through the campus.

== Clubs and activities ==
The school's Latin Club functions as a local chapter of both the Ohio Junior Classical League (OJCL) and National Junior Classical League (NJCL). The school's Gay Straight Alliance club, created in the 2011-2012 school year by two juniors, Ellenore Holbrook and David Seatter, was the first Gay-Straight Alliance Created in the area, launching an increase in clubs around Canton, Ohio.

== Athletics ==
GlenOak is part of the Federal League, an athletic conference that includes the nearby schools of Green High School, Jackson High School, Lake High, McKinley High, North Canton Hoover High, and Perry High.

The school nickname is the Golden Eagle and the mascot is Ernie the Eagle. This, too, represents a combination of the former Glenwood and Oakwood high school traditions. Prior to the merger of those schools in 1975, Glenwood's teams were known as the Eagles, with school colors of red and blue, while Oakwood's were the Golden Raiders, with school colors of green and gold. When the schools were merged to form GlenOak, the mascot became the Golden Eagle, while Oakwood's school colors were retained. (Similarly, the district's former junior high school teams were once known as the Taft Senators and the Middlebranch Diamonds. Those names were discontinued when the district applied the "Golden Eagle" nickname and colors to all schools in the 1980s. Taft and Middlebranch—the latter the original high school in the district—became elementary schools in 2006 as Glenwood and Oakwood became middle schools). The boys basketball team qualified for the OHSAA Final Four in 2007 led by All-American Kosta Koufos. The football team qualified for the OHSAA Playoffs during coach Scott Garcia's (Class of 1987) first 3 years advancing to the regional finals in 2008. The Boys Cross Country team, under Head Coach Bryan Krosse, went to the state tournament in 2009, They finished in 6th place. they did the same in 2022, finishing in 11th place.

=== OHSAA State Championships ===
- Boys Baseball – 1995, 1996
- Girls Basketball – 1989
- Girls Cross Country – 1988
- Girls Swimming – 1982

=== Other State Championships ===
- Boys Water Polo* - 1987
- Girls Water Polo - 1985, 1986, 1987

== Notable alumni ==
- Cleve Bryant, former head coach Ohio University
- Dan Dierdorf, former American football player, television sportscaster
- Dustin Fox, former NFL cornerback (Class of 2001)
- Tim Fox, former American football player
- Brian Hartline, Former NFL wide receiver (Class of 2005)
- Ryan Bergert, Professional baseball pitcher in Major League Baseball on the Kansas City Royals (Class of 2018)
- Joshua Jay, magician (Class of 1999)
- Amanda Kloots, co-host of CBS's The Talk
- Kosta Koufos, basketball player (Class of 2007)
- Marilyn Manson (born Brian Warner), musician (Class of 1987)
- CJ McCollum (born 1991), basketball player (Class of 2009)
- Mark Murphy (born 1958), American football player
- Brian Pittman, musician (Class of 1999)
- Christina Romer, economics professor and presidential advisor
- Mike Sievert, CEO of T-Mobile US (Class of 1987)
- Jeff Shreve, American Public Address Announcer (Class of 1983)
- Matt Thiessen, musician (Class of 1999)
