= Plain Township, Stark County, Ohio =

Township in Ohio, US

- Township
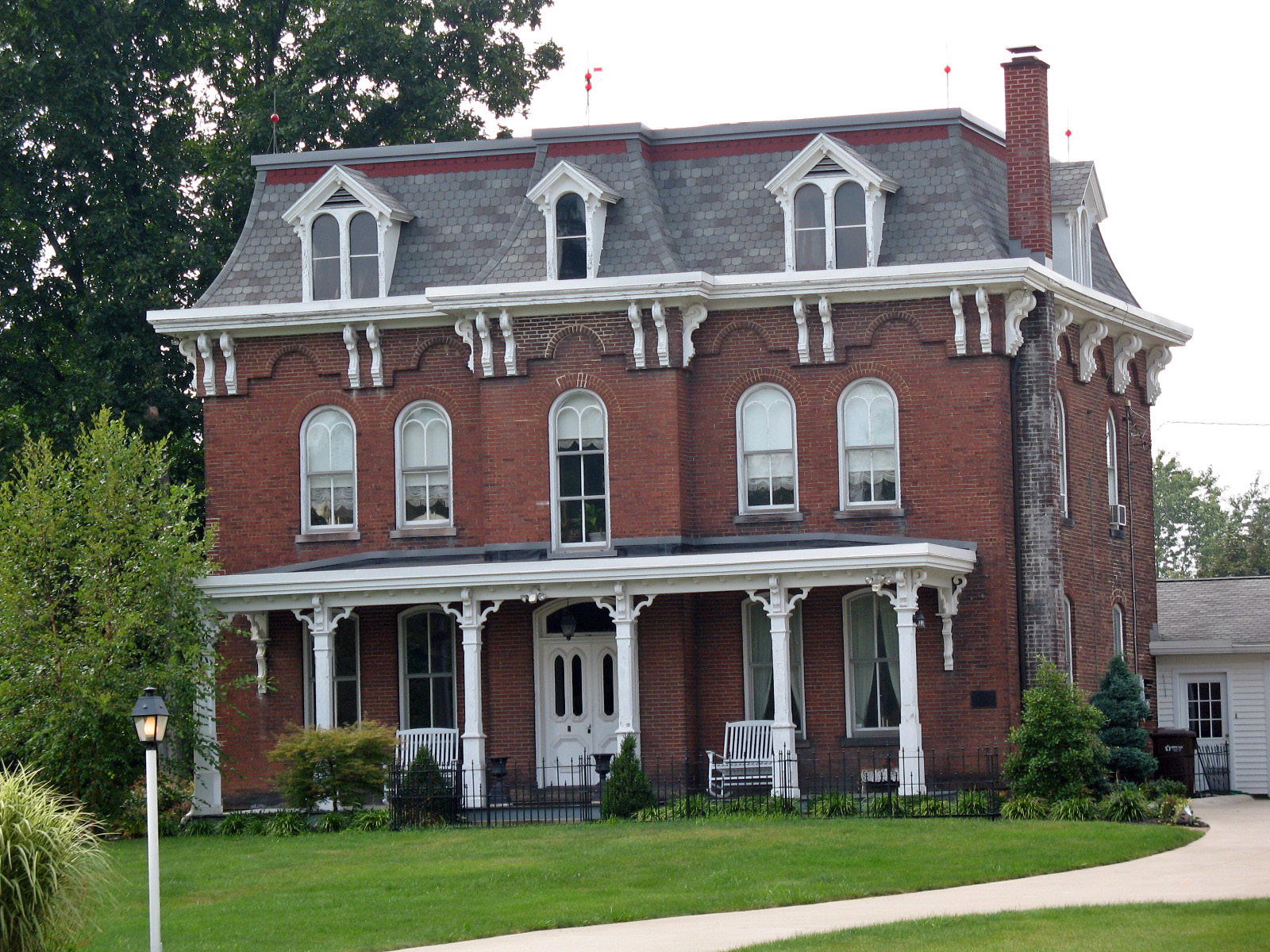
- Jacob H. Bair House

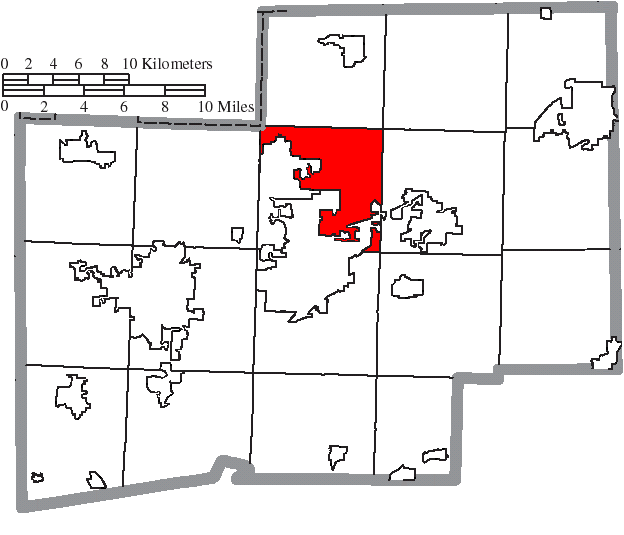
- Location of Plain Township, Stark County, Ohio
- Coordinates: 40.8697946°N 81.3665719°W
- Country: United States
- State: Ohio
- County: Stark
- Established: 1809

Area
  - Total: 28.50 sq mi (73.81 km^{2})
  - Land: 28.30 sq mi (73.29 km^{2})
  - Water: 0.19 sq mi (0.5 km^{2}) 0.67%
- Elevation: 1,109 ft (338 m)

Population (2020)
  - Total: 53,477
  - Estimate (2024): 53,408
  - Density: 1,890/sq mi (729.7/km^{2})
- Time zone: UTC–5 (Eastern (EST))
  - Summer (DST): UTC–4 (EDT)
- ZIP Codes: 44641, 44652, 44705, 44708, 44709, 44714, 44718, 44720, 44721
- Area codes: 330 and 234
- FIPS code: 39-62988
- GNIS feature ID: 1086988
- Website: plaintownshipstarkoh.gov

Plain Township is one of the seventeen townships of Stark County, Ohio, United States. The population was 53,477 at the 2020 census, and was estimated at 53,408 in 2024.

== Name and history ==
When Plain Township was originally formed as a civil township, it was much larger. Lake Township became its own stand alone township in 1816 after its original formation as a survey township within Plain Township and after 1806 within Green Township. Statewide, other Plain Townships are located in Franklin, Wayne, and Wood Counties.

== Geography ==
Located in the north central part of the county, it borders the following townships and city:

- Lake Township - north
- Marlboro Township - northeast corner
- Nimishillen Township - east
- Osnaburg Township - southeast corner
- Canton Township - south
- Perry Township - southwest corner
- Jackson Township - west
- Green - northwest corner

Several populated places are located in Plain Township:

- Part of the city of Canton, the county seat of Stark County, in the south
- The city of North Canton, in the northwest
- Part of the village of Meyers Lake, in the southwest
- The unincorporated community of Avondale, in the southwest
- The unincorporated community of Cairo, in the north
- The census-designated place of Middlebranch, in the northeast

According to the United States Census Bureau, the township has a total area of 28.50 square miles (73.8 km^{2}), of which 28.31 square miles (73.3 km^{2}) is land and 0.19 square miles (0.49 km^{2}) (0.67%) is water.

== Demographics ==
Historical population
Census	Pop.	Note	%±
1880	2,540		—
1890	3,082		21.3%
1900	3,624		17.6%
1910	4,459		23.0%
1920	8,499		90.6%
1930	19,484		129.3%
1940	22,471		15.3%
1950	34,489		53.5%
1960	60,900		76.6%
1970	47,346		−22.3%
1980	48,318		2.1%
1990	49,219		1.9%
2000	51,997		5.6%
2010	52,501		1.0%
2020	53,477		1.9%
2024 (est.)	53,408		−0.1%
U.S. Decennial Census; 2020 Census

=== 2020 census ===
As of the 2020 census, there were 53,477 people, 22,908 households, and 14,404 families residing in the township. The population density was 1,889.18 inhabitants per square mile (729.4/km^{2}). There were 24,198 housing units at an average density of 854.84 per square mile (330.1/km^{2}). The racial makeup of the city was 85.89% White, 5.59% African American, 0.24% Native American, 1.06% Asian, 0.02% Pacific Islander, 0.85% from some other races and 6.36% from two or more races. Hispanic or Latino people of any race were 2.89% of the population.

== Government ==
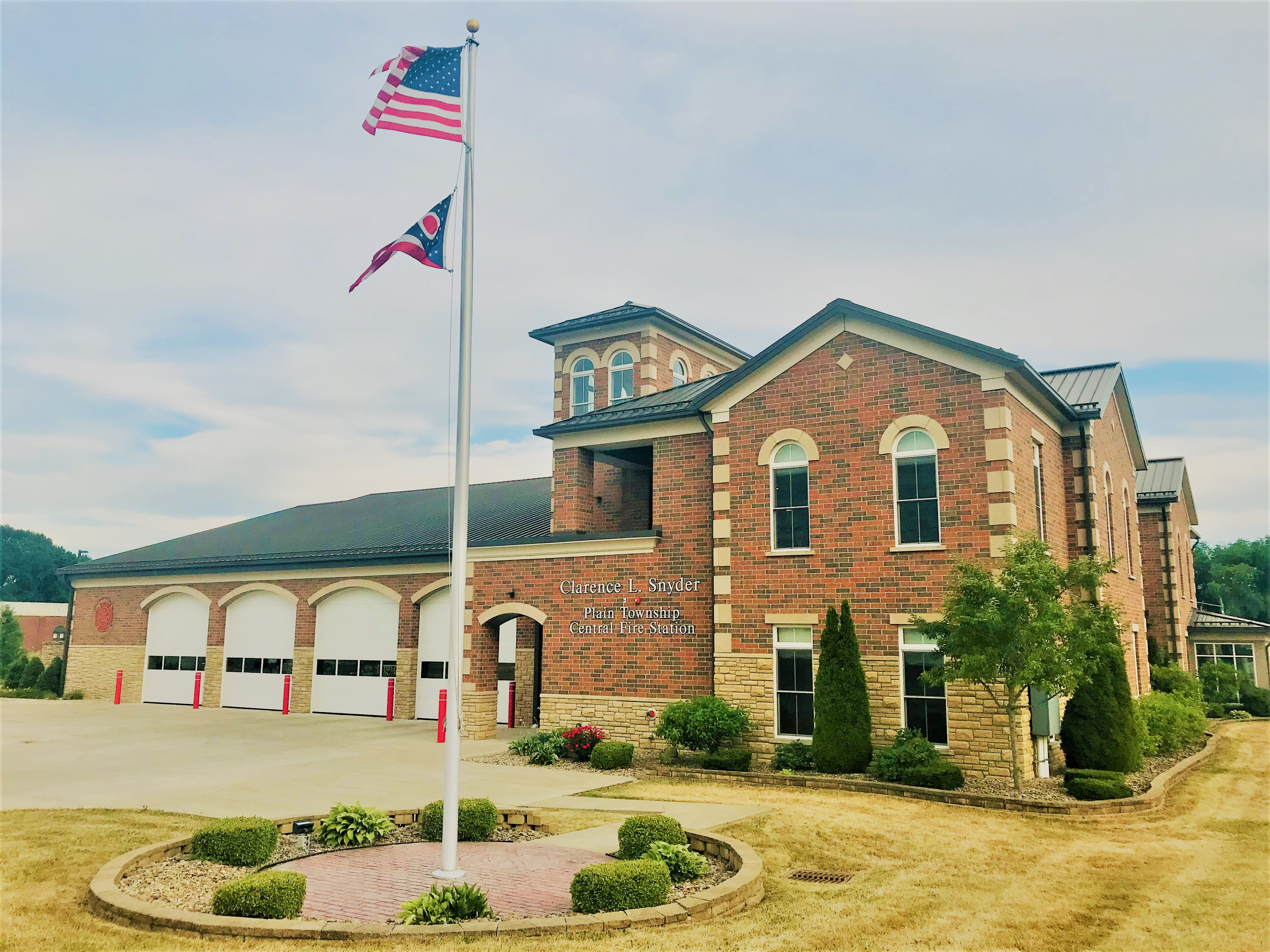
Plain Township Central fire station

The township is governed by a three-member board of trustees, who are elected in November of odd-numbered years to a four-year term beginning on the following January 1. Two are elected in the year after the presidential election and one is elected in the year before it. There is also an elected township fiscal officer, who serves a four-year term beginning on April 1 of the year after the election, which is held in November of the year before the presidential election. Vacancies in the fiscal officership or on the board of trustees are filled by the remaining trustees.

== Education ==
A large portion of the township lies in the Plain Local School District, whose high school is GlenOak High School. The remainder of the township (primarily north of the city of North Canton) is served by the North Canton City Schools.
