= Meyers Lake, Ohio =

- Village
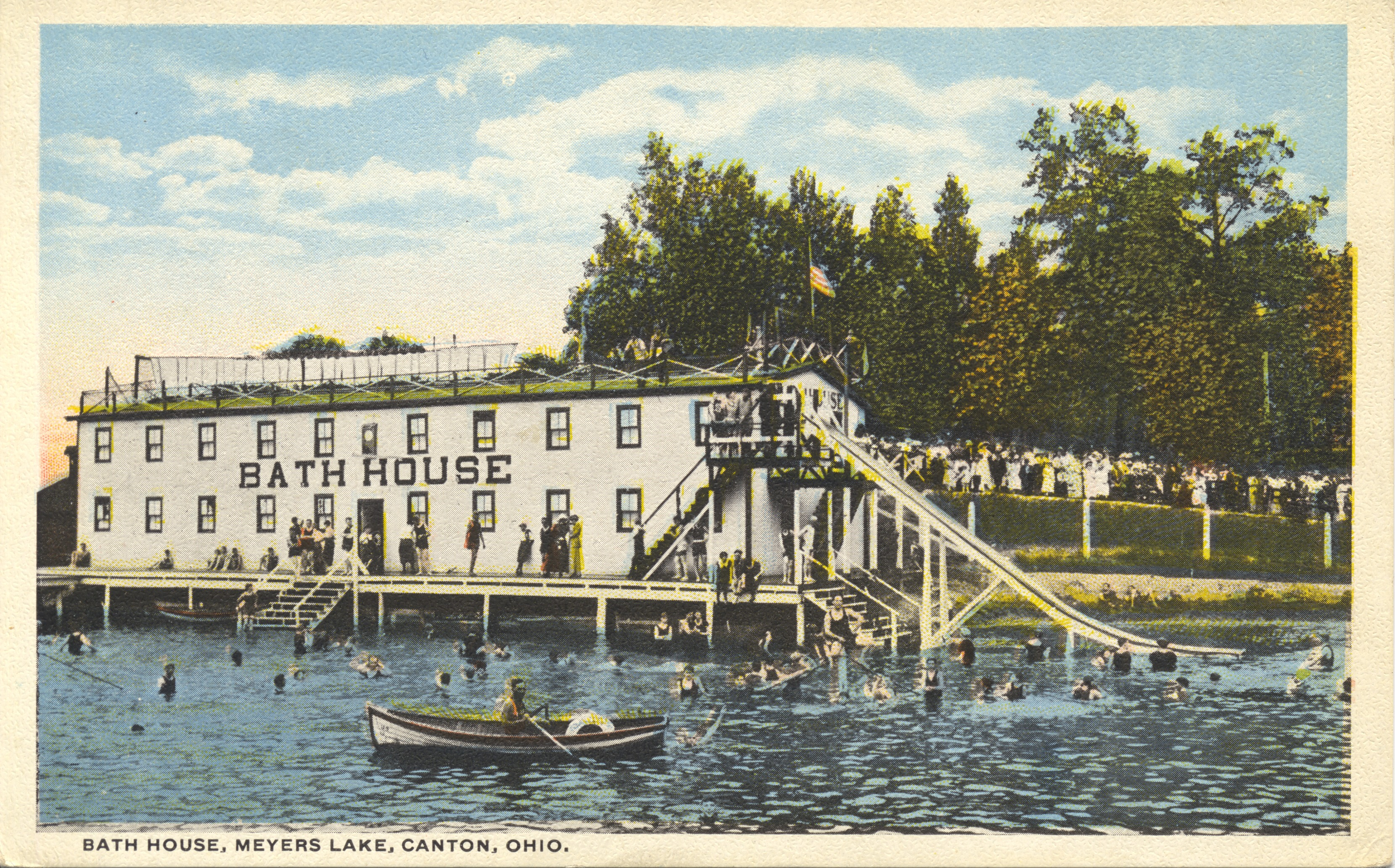
- The Meyers Lake Amusement Park entertained visitors 1920 - 1974

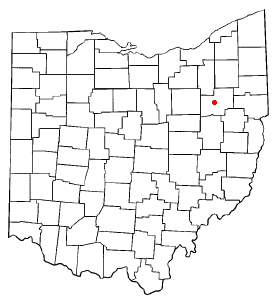
- Location of Meyers Lake, Ohio

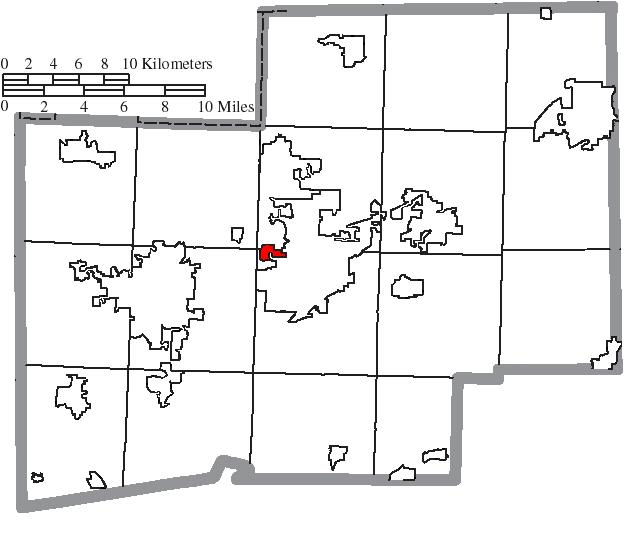
- Location of Meyers Lake in Stark County
- Coordinates: 40°48′57″N 81°24′59″W
- Country: United States
- State: Ohio
- County: Stark

Area
  - Total: 0.44 sq mi (1.13 km^{2})
  - Land: 0.22 sq mi (0.57 km^{2})
  - Water: 0.22 sq mi (0.56 km^{2})
- Elevation: 1,099 ft (335 m)

Population (2020)
  - Total: 724
  - Density: 3,309.3/sq mi (1,277.72/km^{2})
- Time zone: UTC-5 (Eastern (EST))
  - Summer (DST): UTC-4 (EDT)
- FIPS code: 39-49294
- GNIS feature ID: 2399329
- Website: meyers-lake.com

Meyers Lake is a village in central Stark County, Ohio, United States. The population was 724 at the 2020 census. It is part of the Canton–Massillon metropolitan area.

== History ==
The lake was named for Andrew Meyer, a pioneer who settled there.

== Geography ==
According to the United States Census Bureau, the village has a total area of 0.43 square miles (1.11 km^{2}), of which 0.22 square miles (0.57 km^{2}) is land and 0.21 square miles (0.54 km^{2}) is water.

== Demographics ==
Historical population
Census	Pop.	Note	%±
1930	277		—
1940	255		−7.9%
1950	301		18.0%
1960	282		−6.3%
1970	173		−38.7%
1980	222		28.3%
1990	493		122.1%
2000	565		14.6%
2010	569		0.7%
2020	724		27.2%
U.S. Decennial Census

=== 2010 census ===
As of the census of 2010, there were 569 people, 328 households, and 154 families living in the village. The population density was 2,586.4 inhabitants per square mile (998.6/km^{2}). There were 373 housing units at an average density of 1,695.5 per square mile (654.6/km^{2}). The racial makeup of the village was 95.6% White, 2.6% African American, 0.7% Asian, and 1.1% from two or more races. Hispanic or Latino of any race were 0.9% of the population.

There were 328 households, of which 6.7% had children under the age of 18 living with them, 38.4% were married couples living together, 4.9% had a female householder with no husband present, 3.7% had a male householder with no wife present, and 53.0% were non-families. 46.3% of all households were made up of individuals, and 18% had someone living alone who was 65 years of age or older. The average household size was 1.69 and the average family size was 2.27.

The median age in the village was 59.3 years. 6.5% of residents were under the age of 18; 3% were between the ages of 18 and 24; 14.8% were from 25 to 44; 41% were from 45 to 64; and 34.6% were 65 years of age or older. The gender makeup of the village was 45.7% male and 54.3% female.

=== 2000 census ===
As of the census of 2000, there were 565 people, 308 households, and 169 families living in the village. The population density was 2,548.4 inhabitants per square mile (983.9/km^{2}). There were 344 housing units at an average density of 1,551.6 per square mile (599.1/km^{2}). The racial makeup of the village was 96.64% White, 2.30% African American, 0.18% Asian, and 0.88% from two or more races. Hispanic or Latino of any race were 1.59% of the population.

There were 308 households, out of which 9.1% had children under the age of 18 living with them, 46.4% were married couples living together, 5.2% had a female householder with no husband present, and 45.1% were non-families. 39.0% of all households were made up of individuals, and 13.0% had someone living alone who was 65 years of age or older. The average household size was 1.80 and the average family size was 2.30.

In the village, the population was spread out, with 8.3% under the age of 18, 4.1% from 18 to 24, 23.7% from 25 to 44, 37.5% from 45 to 64, and 26.4% who were 65 years of age or older. The median age was 53 years. For every 100 females there were 78.8 males. For every 100 females age 18 and over, there were 79.9 males.

The median income for a household in the village was $48,942, and the median income for a family was $57,917. Males had a median income of $46,750 versus $28,295 for females. The per capita income for the village was $35,836. About 4.0% of families and 6.6% of the population were below the poverty line, including 10.0% of those under age 18 and 10.2% of those age 65 or over.
