= National Register of Historic Places listings in Columbiana County, Ohio =

Location of Columbiana County in Ohio

This is a list of the National Register of Historic Places listings in Columbiana County, Ohio.

This is intended to be a complete list of the properties and districts on the National Register of Historic Places in Columbiana County, Ohio, United States. The locations of National Register properties and districts for which the latitude and longitude coordinates are included below, may be seen in an online map.

There are 45 properties and districts listed on the National Register in the county, including 1 National Historic Landmark.

This National Park Service list is complete through NPS recent listings posted March 14, 2025.

== Current listings ==
	Name on the Register	Image	Date listed	Location	City or town	Description
1	Beginning Point of the U.S. Public Land Survey	Beginning Point of the U.S. Public Land Survey	October 15, 1966 (#66000606)	On the Ohio/Pennsylvania border, east of East Liverpool; 40°38′33″N 80°31′10″W	East Liverpool	Point from which the Public Land Survey System was performed, starting in 1785, which would open what was then the Northwest Territory for settlement.
2	Hiram Bell Farmstead	Hiram Bell Farmstead	December 9, 1999 (#99001496)	43628 State Route 517; 40°49′00″N 80°40′34″W	Fairfield Township	Greek Revival farmstead, designed and built in 1850
3	Burchfield Homestead	Burchfield Homestead	March 23, 1999 (#99000320)	867 E. 4th St. 40°54′14″N 80°50′57″W	Salem	Boyhood home of American watercolorist Charles E. Burchfield
4	Carnegie Public Library	Carnegie Public Library	March 11, 1980 (#80002963)	219 E. 4th St. 40°37′04″N 80°34′41″W	East Liverpool	The first library in Ohio funded by Andrew Carnegie, who spent a large part of his childhood in East Liverpool
5	Richard L. Cawood Residence	Richard L. Cawood Residence	January 21, 1988 (#87002502)	2600 St. Clair Ave. 40°38′38″N 80°34′23″W	East Liverpool	Built in 1923 by Richard Cawood.
6	Cherry Valley Coke Ovens	Cherry Valley Coke Ovens	May 6, 1993 (#93000404)	Junction of Cherry Valley and Butcher Rds. 40°53′04″N 80°45′21″W	Leetonia	The site represents the largest remaining site of beehive coke ovens in North America
7	Church Hill Road Covered Bridge	Church Hill Road Covered Bridge	June 11, 1975 (#75001347)	On dry ground at Elkton, off State Route 154; 40°45′43″N 80°42′13″W	Elkrun Township	Built in 1870, one of the shortest covered bridges for public highway use in the United States. Relocated in 1963 when Church Hill Road was realigned
8	City Hall	City Hall	November 14, 1985 (#85003511)	6th St. 40°37′12″N 80°34′51″W	East Liverpool	Built in 1934 as a project of the Civil Works Administration. Stylistically, the building is an example of Art Deco architecture that was prominent in the 1930s.
9	Columbiana County Infirmary	Columbiana County Infirmary	June 20, 1979 (#79001795)	West of Lisbon on County Home Rd. 40°46′40″N 80°49′42″W	Center Township	
10	Diamond Historic District	Diamond Historic District	November 14, 1985 (#85003508)	Market and E. 6th Sts. 40°37′13″N 80°34′47″W	East Liverpool	
11	East Fifth Street Historic District	East Fifth Street Historic District	November 14, 1985 (#85003510)	Along E. 5th St. between Market St. and Broadway; 40°37′08″N 80°34′44″W	East Liverpool	
12	East Liverpool Downtown Historic District	East Liverpool Downtown Historic District	May 30, 2001 (#01000591)	Roughly bounded by W. 6th St., Dresden Ave., Welch Ave., Broadway, Walnut St., E. 4th St., and East Alley; 40°37′08″N 80°34′46″W	East Liverpool	
13	East Liverpool Post Office	East Liverpool Post Office	November 21, 1976 (#76001384)	5th and Broadway Sts. 40°37′06″N 80°34′38″W	East Liverpool	
14	East Liverpool Pottery	East Liverpool Pottery	October 7, 1971 (#71000636)	Southeastern corner of 2nd and Market Sts. 40°36′59″N 80°34′52″W	East Liverpool	
15	Nicholas Eckis House	Nicholas Eckis House	January 3, 1980 (#80002962)	High St. in East Fairfield; 40°49′21″N 80°38′09″W	Fairfield Township	
16	Elks Club	Elks Club	November 14, 1985 (#85003512)	139 W. 5th St. 40°37′11″N 80°34′54″W	East Liverpool	
17	Episcopal Church of the Ascension and Manse	Episcopal Church of the Ascension and Manse	May 15, 1986 (#86001061)	1101 and 1109 11th St. 40°36′07″N 80°39′03″W	Wellsville	
18	Gaston's Mill-Lock No. 36, Sandy and Beaver Canal District	Gaston's Mill-Lock No. 36, Sandy and Beaver Canal District	May 23, 1974 (#74001423)	About 1 mi (1.6 km) south of Clarkson in Beaver Creek State Forest; 40°43′39″N 80°36′46″W	Middleton Township	Water-powered mill constructed in 1837 powered by Little Beaver Creek. Lock 36 was one of 90 locks on the Sandy and Beaver Canal. Both renovated.
19	Godwin-Knowles House	Godwin-Knowles House	November 14, 1985 (#85003515)	422 Broadway; 40°37′03″N 80°34′38″W	East Liverpool	A mansion built in 1890 and later converted into the local Masonic temple
20	Hanna-Kenty House	Hanna-Kenty House	November 21, 2001 (#01001257)	251 E. High St. 40°46′28″N 80°45′55″W	Lisbon	
21	Hanoverton Canal Town District	Hanoverton Canal Town District	August 3, 1977 (#77001050)	U.S. Route 30; 40°45′09″N 80°56′08″W	Hanoverton	
22	Franklin Harris Farmstead	Franklin Harris Farmstead	November 24, 1997 (#97001462)	3525 Depot Rd. south of Salem; 40°50′57″N 80°51′29″W	Butler Township	
23	Daniel Howell Hise House	Daniel Howell Hise House	March 25, 1999 (#99000319)	1100 Franklin Ave. 40°53′32″N 80°50′32″W	Salem	Home of local abolitionist Daniel Howell Hise
24	Hostetter Inn	Hostetter Inn	September 27, 1980 (#80002965)	Northwest of Lisbon at 32901 State Route 172; 40°47′34″N 80°52′50″W	Hanover Township	
25	Ikirt House	Ikirt House	May 29, 1980 (#80002964)	200 6th St. 40°37′14″N 80°34′54″W	East Liverpool	
26	Jones-Bowman House	Jones-Bowman House	December 12, 1976 (#76001383)	540 Pittsburgh St. 40°52′56″N 80°41′07″W	Columbiana	
27	Homer Laughlin House	Homer Laughlin House	November 14, 1985 (#85003513)	414 Broadway; 40°37′03″N 80°34′38″W	East Liverpool	Destroyed
28	Lisbon Historic District	Lisbon Historic District	August 24, 1979 (#79001794)	U.S. Route 30 and State Route 45; 40°46′23″N 80°45′59″W	Lisbon	
29	Daniel McBean Farmstead	Daniel McBean Farmstead	January 12, 2005 (#05001518)	18709 Fife Coal Rd. northwest of Wellsville; 40°37′48″N 80°42′35″W	Yellow Creek Township	
30	Middle Sandy Presbyterian Church	Middle Sandy Presbyterian Church	May 13, 1994 (#94000414)	Homeworth Rd. in Homeworth; 40°50′16″N 81°04′10″W	Knox Township	
31	John H. Morgan Surrender Site	John H. Morgan Surrender Site	April 23, 1973 (#73001401)	3.1 mi (5.0 km) west of West Point on State Route 518; 40°41′50″N 80°44′38″W	Wayne Township	
32	New Garden Monthly Meetinghouse		August 26, 2022 (#100008030)	32114 Winona Rd. 40°49′41″N 80°53′38″W	Hanoverton	
33	Odd Fellows Temple	Odd Fellows Temple	November 14, 1985 (#85003514)	120 W. 6th St. 40°37′16″N 80°34′50″W	East Liverpool	
34	Mary A. Patterson Memorial	Mary A. Patterson Memorial	November 14, 1985 (#85003516)	E. 4th St. 40°37′03″N 80°34′42″W	East Liverpool	
35	Potters National Bank	Potters National Bank	November 14, 1985 (#85003518)	Broadway and 4th St. 40°37′01″N 80°34′40″W	East Liverpool	Demolished on 16 November 2010
36	Potters Savings and Loan	Potters Savings and Loan	November 14, 1985 (#85003517)	Washington and Broadway; 40°37′08″N 80°34′41″W	East Liverpool	
37	Salem Downtown Historic District	Salem Downtown Historic District	December 7, 1995 (#95001416)	Roughly bounded by Vine Ave., Ohio Ave., E. Pershing St., S. Ellsworth Ave. and Sugar Tree Alley; 40°53′59″N 80°49′34″W	Salem	
38	Salem Methodist Episcopal Church	Salem Methodist Episcopal Church	March 9, 1995 (#95000167)	244 S. Broadway; 40°53′56″N 80°51′18″W	Salem	
39	Charles Nelson Schmick House	Charles Nelson Schmick House	March 21, 1991 (#91000250)	110 Walnut St. 40°52′47″N 80°45′36″W	Leetonia	
40	South Lincoln Avenue Historic District	South Lincoln Avenue Historic District	August 26, 1993 (#93000876)	S. Lincoln Ave., roughly between Pershing and Summit Sts. 40°53′42″N 80°50′59″W	Salem	
41	John Street House	John Street House	October 10, 1973 (#73001400)	631 N. Ellsworth Ave. 40°54′17″N 80°51′26″W	Salem	Underground Railroad stop and home of son of city founder
42	Teegarden-Centennial Covered Bridge	Teegarden-Centennial Covered Bridge	August 10, 2000 (#00000961)	Eagleton Rd. (Township Road 761), 0.1 mi (0.16 km) east of County Road 411, south of Salem; 40°49′18″N 80°49′38″W	Salem Township	
43	Cassius Clark Thompson House	Cassius Clark Thompson House	September 28, 1971 (#71000637)	305 Walnut St. 40°36′59″N 80°34′34″W	East Liverpool	
44	Travelers Hotel	Travelers Hotel	July 15, 1986 (#86001718)	115 E. 4th St. 40°37′05″N 80°34′48″W	East Liverpool	
45	YMCA	YMCA	November 14, 1985 (#85003509)	Washington and 4th Sts. 40°37′04″N 80°34′45″W	East Liverpool	

== See also ==
- List of National Historic Landmarks in Ohio
- Listings in neighboring counties: Beaver (PA), Carroll, Hancock (WV), Jefferson, Lawrence (PA), Mahoning, Stark
- National Register of Historic Places listings in Ohio
