= Diamond Historic District =

Diamond Historic District may refer to:

- Diamond Historic District (Lynn, Massachusetts), listed on the National Register of Historic Places in Essex County, Massachusetts
- Diamond Historic District (East Liverpool, Ohio), listed on the National Register of Historic Places in Columbiana County, Ohio

== See also ==
- Diamond Match Historic District, Barberton, Ohio, listed on the National Register of Historic Places in Summit County, Ohio
- West Diamond Street Townhouse Historic District, Philadelphia, Pennsylvania, listed on the National Register of Historic Places in North Philadelphia
- Diamond Hill Historic District, Lynchburg, Virginia, listed on the NRHP in Lynchburg, Virginia
