= The Great Smith House Hustle =

1993 novel by Jane Louise Curry

- First edition
- Author: Jane Louise Curry
- Language: English
- Genre: Novel
- Publisher: Margaret K. McElderry Books
- Publication date: 1993
- Publication place: Philippines
- Media type: Print (hardback)
- Pages: 170 pp
- ISBN: 0-689-50580-9
- OCLC: 26858039
- LC Class: PZ7.C936 Gt 1993
- Preceded by: The Big Smith Snatch

The Great Smith House Hustle is a novel for children by the American writer Jane Louise Curry.

The Smith clan, who after moving across the country to live in Grandma Smith's old house in Pittsburgh, Pennsylvania, learn they are to be evicted. The Smith children, with the help of the community, race to uncover a long-standing scam to steal the houses of seniors before the savings and loan bank repossesses Grandma's home.
