= Lotus Ware =

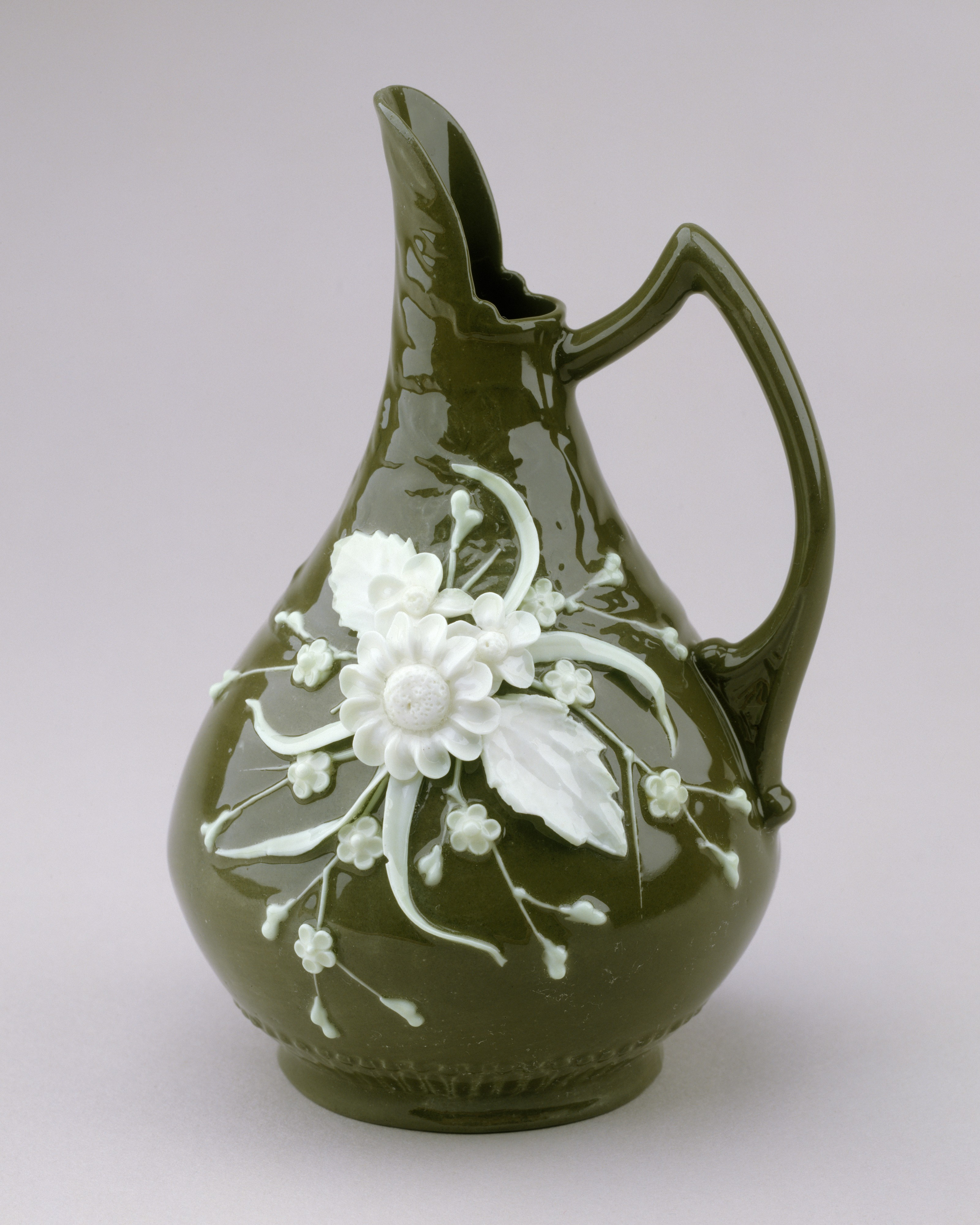
Pitcher, 1891-97

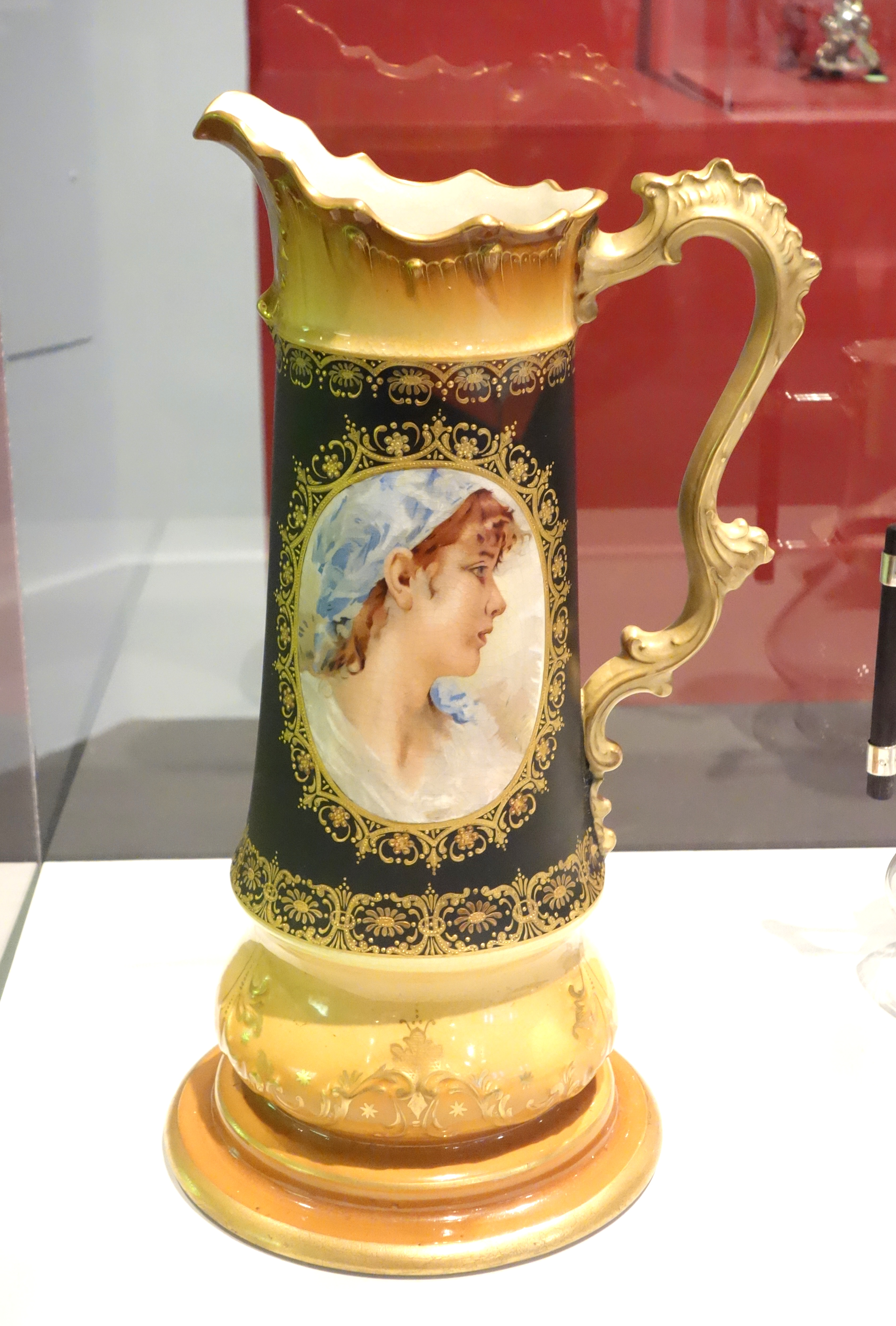
Pitcher by Knowles, Taylor, Knowles, c. 1905, glazed semivitreous porcelain

Lotus Ware is a type of porcelain produced from approximately 1892 to 1896 at the Knowles, Taylor & Knowles (KT&K) pottery of East Liverpool, Ohio, United States. It is thought that the name may have originated from a comment made by the owner, Isaac Knowles, asserting that the glaze of the pieces resembled the glossy sheen of lotus blossom petals. These ceramics were ranked at the top at the 1893 World's Fair in Chicago, where they won every prize for fine porcelain. It is generally considered to be the finest porcelain ever produced in the United States.

== Knowles, Taylor & Knowles ==
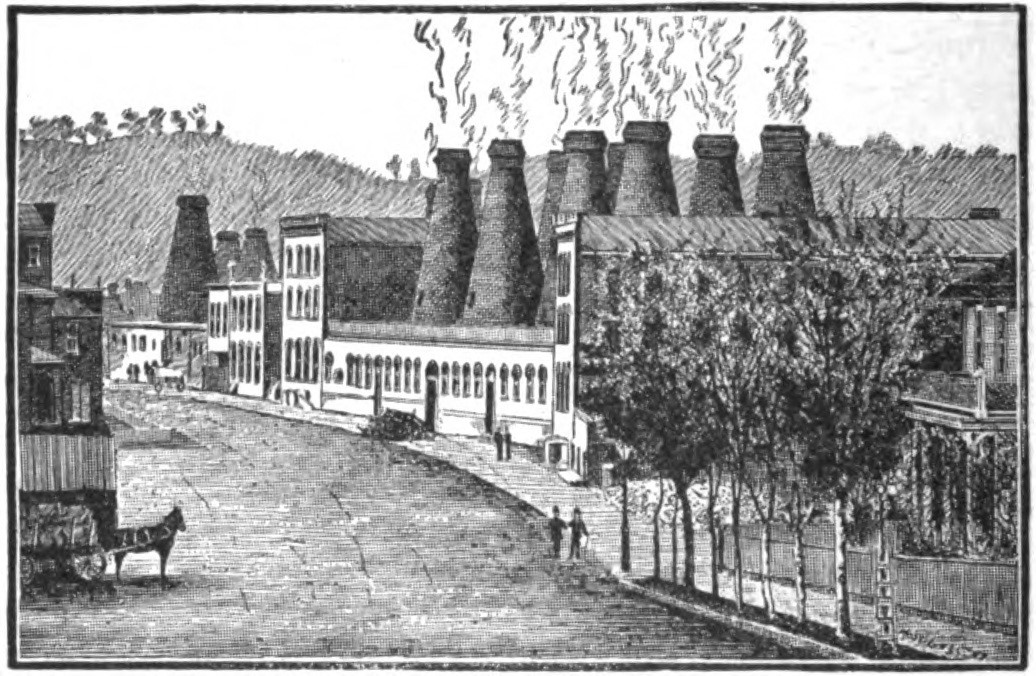
Knowles, Taylor & Knowles Pottery in 1887

Isaac Knowles started his pottery in East Liverpool in 1854. He produced Rockingham pottery, yellow Queen's ware, and ceramic canning jars. The operation expanded and in 1870, John Taylor and Homer S. Knowles joined the company. By 1880, KT&K was the largest pottery maker in East Liverpool. By the 1880s, it was producing translucent china. By 1890, the company was the largest manufacturer of white granite plain and decorative ware in the nation. In the late 19th century, factories in the city produced nearly half of all American domestic and hotel ware.

The KT&K management was forward-thinking in establishing an in-house design-and-decoration shop instead of using outside designers. KT&K had, by 1888, purchased another pottery and constructed another plant with eight kilns. The company also constructed a plant dedicated exclusively to the production of bone china. In the United States, bone china had previously been made only in Trenton, New Jersey. Before KT&K's efforts, another East Liverpool potter, John Burgess, and his son-in-law, Willis Cunning, had briefly attempted to produce bone china. Their operation was short-lived, shuttered by East Liverpool City Council, which declared the odor of calcined bones to be a health hazard.

The porcelain plant was KT&K's entry into serious competition with European manufacturers. After a year and a half of operation, KT&K's porcelain plant burned down in November 1889. The plant was soon rebuilt, and Lotus Ware appeared on the market again from 1892.

Lotus Ware was perfected by two men. An Englishman named Joshua Poole had arrived in East Liverpool after having worked for the Belleek pottery in County Fermanagh, northern Ireland. Owner Isaac Knowles wanted to manufacture beautiful art porcelain. Joshua Poole's training as a ceramic engineer was a considerable aid to Knowles' search for the ideal blend of beauty and strength. Poole was in charge of formulating the clay bodies.

The other man responsible for Lotus Ware was Heinrich Schmidt, a German immigrant. He had experience as a decorator, or "fancy worker" in late 19th-century pottery slang, having worked at the renowned Meissen factory in Germany. At KT&K he was responsible for preparing the Lotus Ware slip. By committing the slip recipe to memory and refusing to keep a written version, Schmidt kept its formulation secret. His goal was that KT&K sell only perfect Lotus Ware.

This product was first publicly introduced and exhibited at the 1893 World's Columbian Exposition in Chicago, where it swept the competition.

== Stylistic influences ==
The idealized depiction of the natural world common to the then-fashionable Art Nouveau style was a significant influence: the twining tendrils, leaves, blossoms, shells and coral branches were formed and applied mainly by hand, but occasionally the difficult pâté-sur-pâté ("paste upon paste") technique was employed.
Moorish and Persian influences were also evident, including ornate arched shapes, stylized swirls, and an excess of minute detail such as netting, fish-scale patterning, and tiny enamel-like dots, which appear like inset jewels on the ware's surface.

== Technique ==
Schmidt used a technique called tube-lining, in which thick slip was applied via what was essentially like a large, sturdy pastry bag. He then constructed plaster of Paris molds on which the designs were worked out and allowed to dry. These were gently removed from the molds and attached to the main body of the ware with fresh slip. After that further painted decoration, glazing and firing took place.

Fundamental Lotus Ware forms were produced only in three colors: pure white, celadon and a deep shade of olive green, which was extremely popular in Europe in the late 19th century. Sometimes additional decoration in only a few other colors, especially a saturated shade of lavender, was used, but all other color was added only in the form of hand-painted decoration and (very rarely) decals. Lotus Ware forms all bore classical names such as Syrian, Thebian, Lanconian and Grecian. This was due to the fact that the company intended to promote an image of classic, high-quality ware.

== Financial losses and the end of Lotus Ware ==
Because of the refinements of the process and decorative elements, the production losses of Lotus Ware were very high, estimated to be as high as 90%. Despite the heavy financial losses incurred by its high manufacturing losses, KT&K continued to produce Lotus Ware until approximately 1896.

The company continued to flourish until the 1920s, but started to decline and eventually closed for good in 1931.

An estimated 5,000 pieces of Lotus Ware survive. East Liverpool's Museum of Ceramics has the largest public display of Lotus Ware in the world.

== Legacy ==
An Ohio state historic marker was installed in East Liverpool to commemorate the site of KT&K.
