= Jane Louise Curry =

American novelist

- Born: September 24, 1932 (age 92); East Liverpool, Ohio, U.S.
- Occupation: Author
- Genres: Adventure fiction; fantasy; mystery fiction

Website
- www.janelouisecurry.com

Jane Louise Curry, born September 24, 1932, in East Liverpool, Ohio, is a prolific author of adventure, fantasy, mystery, time travel, and American Indian tales for older children and teenagers. She has written 39 books.

Her novels include the famous Abaloc series, set in the magical landscape of the Ohio Valley and surrounding regions in contemporary, medieval, and prehistoric times.

== Bibliography ==
Abaloc series

1. Beneath the Hill 1967
2. The Change-Child 1969
3. The Daybreakers 1970
4. Over the Sea's Edge 1971
5. The Watchers 1975
6. The Birdstones 1977
7. The Wolves of Aam 1981
8. Shadow Dancers 1983

Smith Family series

- The Big Smith Snatch 1989
- The Great Smith House Hustle 1993

Collections

- Down from the Lonely Mountain: California Indian Tales 1965
- Back in the Beforetime: Tales of the California Indians 1987
- Turtle Island: Tales of the Algonquian Nation 1999
- The Wonderful Sky Boat: And Other Native American Tales of the Southeast 2001
- Hold Up the Sky: And Other Native American Tales from Texas and the Southern Plains 2003

- The Sleepers 1968
- Mindy's Mysterious Miniature 1970
- The Housenapper 1971
- The Ice Ghosts Mystery 1972
- The Lost Farm 1974
- Parsley Sage, Rosemary & Time 1975
- The Magical Cupboard 1976
- Poor Tom's Ghost 1977
- The Bassumtyte Treasure 1978
- Ghost Lane 1979
- The Great Flood Mystery 1985
- The Lotus Cup 1986
- Me, Myself, and I 1987
- Little, Little Sister 1988
- What the Dickens 1991
- The Christmas Knight 1993
- Robin Hood and His Merry Men 1994
- Robin Hood in the Greenwood 1995
- Moon Window 1996
- Dark Shade 1998
- A Stolen Life 1999
- The Egyptian Box 2002
- Brave Cloelia 2004 (illustrated by Jeff Crosby)
- The Black Canary 2005
