= Columbiana County Airport =

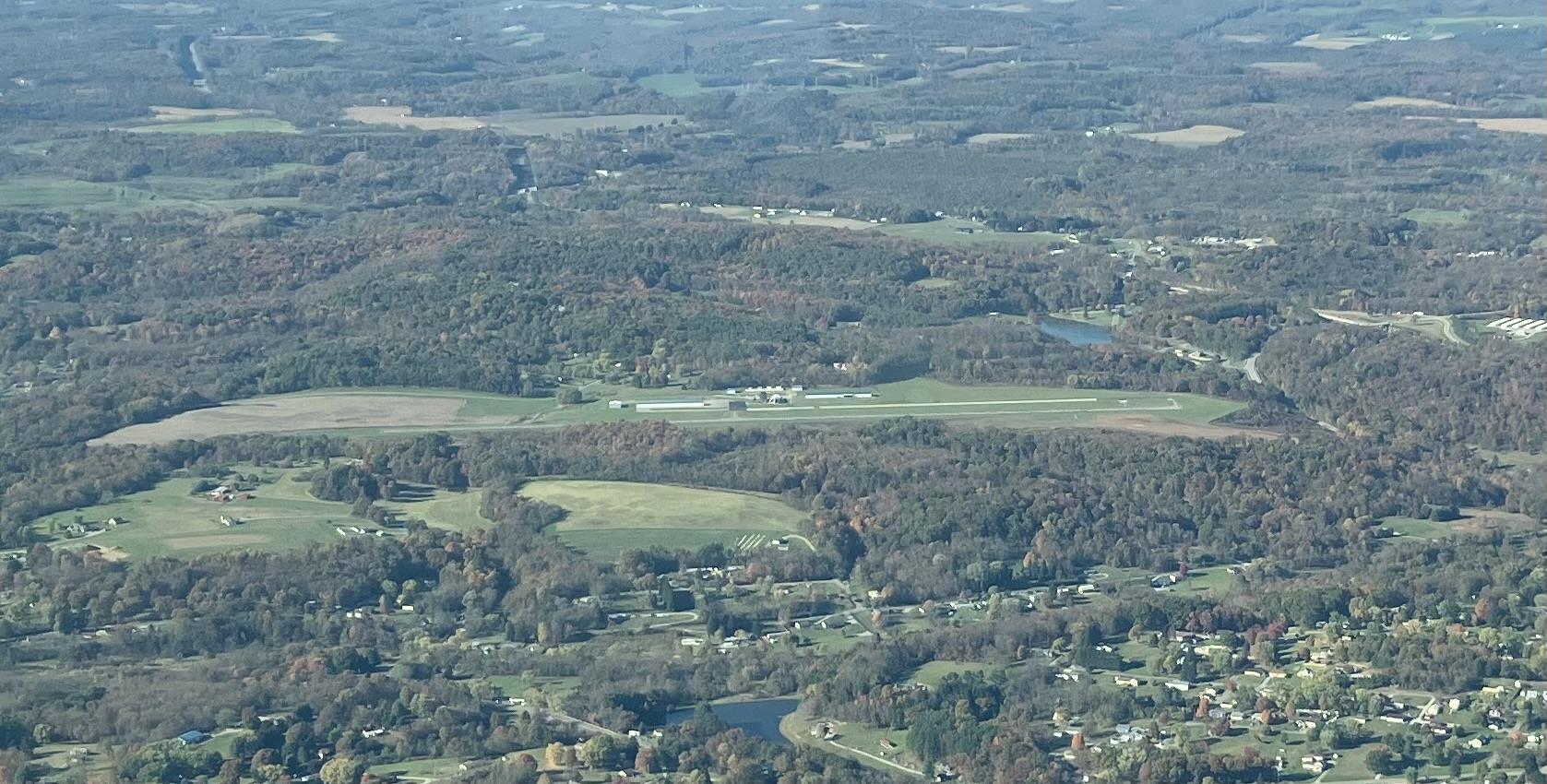
- IATA: none; ICAO: none; FAA LID: 02G

Summary
- Airport type: Public
- Owner: Columbiana County Airport Authority
- Location: East Liverpool, Ohio
- Time zone: UTC−05:00 (-5)
  - Summer (DST): UTC−04:00 (-4)
- Elevation AMSL: 1,161 ft (354 m)
- Coordinates: 40°40′23″N 080°38′29″W

Map
- Location of airport in Ohio O2G (the United States)

Runways
Direction	Length		Surface
Direction	ft	m	Surface
07/25	3,503	1,068	Asphalt

Statistics (2023)
- Aircraft operations (year ending 6/26/2023): 31,100
- Based aircraft: 26
- Source: Federal Aviation Administration

Columbiana County Airport (FAA LID: 02G) is a public airport located four miles northwest of East Liverpool, Ohio, United States. It is owned and operated by the Columbiana County Airport Authority.

== History ==
The airport officially opened in early September 1970 and was dedicated just under two months later. It was given the subtitle Mike Turk Field, after the individual who donated the land. Several members of the airport authority subsequently threatened to resign over the name.

Corbi Air was located at the airport.

In 2023, the airport hosted a "Wings and Wheels" event with classic cars and aircraft, skydiving, antique and sport aircraft, food, and more. The event funded K-9 rescue training.

== Facilities and aircraft ==
Columbiana County Airport covers an area of 142 acres (57 ha) which contains one runway designated 07/25 with a 3,503 ft × 75 ft (1,068 m × 23 m) asphalt pavement. For the 12-month period ending June 26, 2023, the airport had 31,100 aircraft operations: 99% general aviation, <1% air taxi, and <1% military. For the same time period, 26 aircraft were based at the airport, all airplanes: 24 single-engine and 2 multi-engine.

The airport received a $620,000 federal grant to rehabilitate 2,000 feet of taxiway to ensure the airport's structural integrity.

The airport has a fixed-base operator that sells fuel, both avgas and jet fuel, and provides services and amenities such as catering, hangars, internet, a crew lounge, snooze rooms, and more.

== Accidents and incidents ==
- On July 7, 2011, an amateur-built Burtner Derjager D IX sustained substantial damage when it impacted trees and terrain during a forced landing after an aborted landing from runway 7 at the Columbiana County Airport. While performing high-speed taxi tests, the pilot pulled the airplane into the air. Though there was positive rate of climb, the controls were sensitive. On the final of multiple touch-and-gos, the aircraft porpoised, and the aircraft struck the runway hard. The pilot applied power and aborted the landing. When the airplane was about 100 feet above the ground, the propeller disintegrated, and the engine began to vibrate violently. The probable cause of the accident was found to be the pilot's improper landing flare, which resulted in a porpoised landing and propeller contact with the runway, which caused an in-flight disintegration of the propeller during the go-around, and subsequent collision with trees.

== See also ==
- List of airports in Ohio
