= Babbs Island =

Island in West Virginia, United States

- Location within West Virginia Location within the United States

Geography
- Location: Ohio River
- Coordinates: 40°37′30″N 80°33′19″W
- Highest elevation: 679 ft (207 m)

Administration
- United States
- State: West Virginia
- County: Hancock

Additional information
- Time zone: Eastern (EST) (UTC-5)
  - Summer (DST): EDT (UTC-4)
- GNIS feature ID: 1535092; Variant names: Babb's Island

Babbs Island is an island in Hancock County, West Virginia on the Ohio River between East Liverpool, Ohio and Chester, West Virginia. It takes its name from the Babb family of Columbiana County, Ohio which once owned the island from 1804 to 1820—John Babb (1768-1829) was the original owner. The pylons of the U.S. Route 30 bridge between East Liverpool and Chester completed in 1978 lie on Babbs Island's southwestern flank.

The southernmost end of the island is owned by West Virginia. Past that is owned by The Babbs Island Boating Association. This is a privately owned island. The association to buy or lease land.

Babbs Island Boating Association was started in the 1987, Camps were sold for $500 a piece, and were bought from the Dravo Corporation. Ever since then, Babbs Island has been a major camping site for members of the association, and is still. Currently there are 25 camps on the upriver half, and a little less on the downriver side. The downriver half is not owned by the Babbs Island Boating Association, but owned by a different one.

Babbs Island is 0.8 miles long and is located in the Ohio River near East Liverpool, Ohio, and Chester, WV.
