= Ikirt House =

Historic house in Ohio, United States

- U.S. National Register of Historic Places
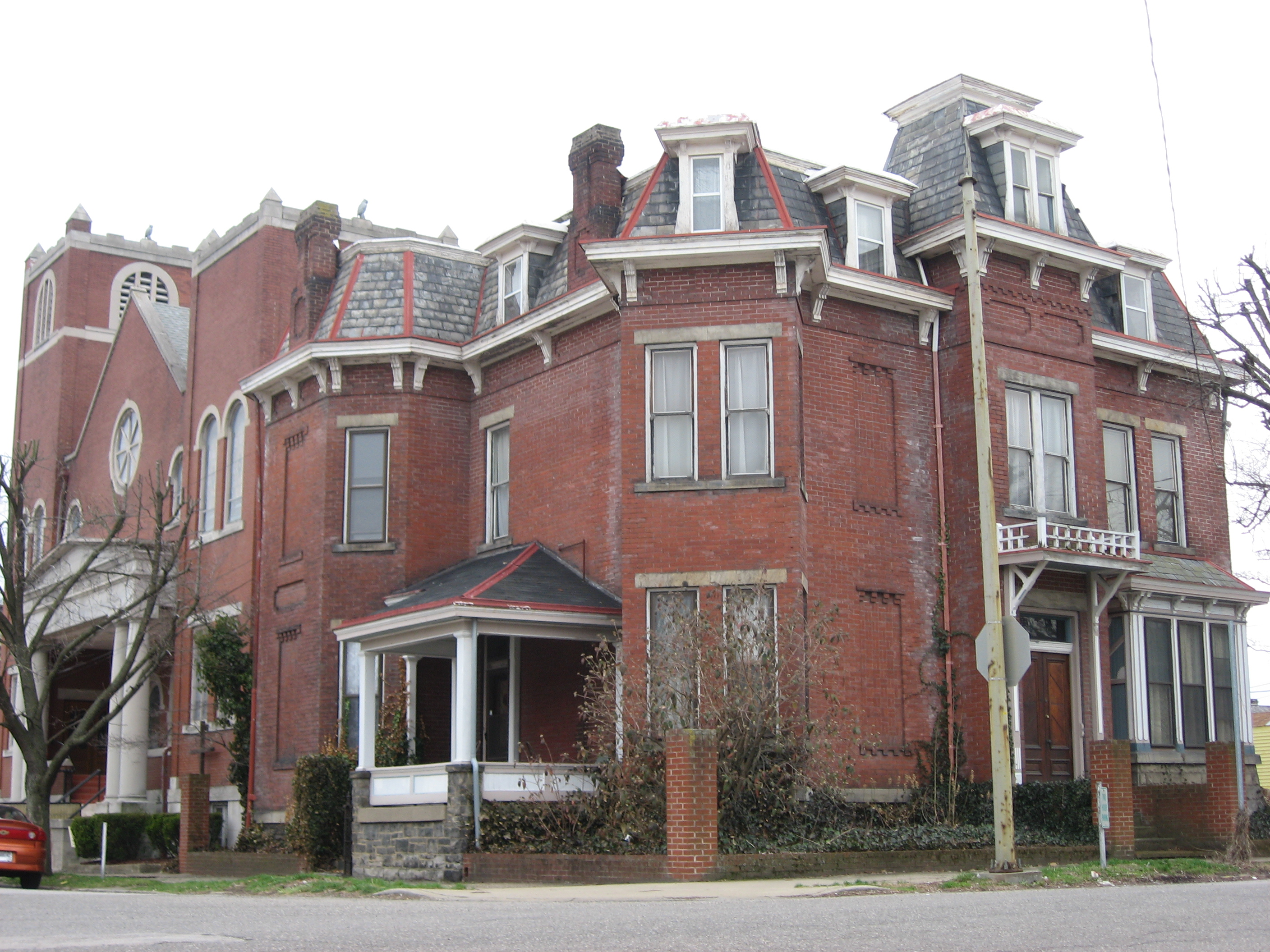
- Ikirt House, East Liverpool, Ohio

- Location within Ohio Location within the United States
- Location: 200 6th St., East Liverpool, Ohio
- Coordinates: 40°37′14″N 80°34′54″W
- Area: less than one acre
- Built: 1888
- Architectural style: Second Empire, Stick/eastlake, Queen Anne
- NRHP reference No.: 80002964
- Added to NRHP: May 29, 1980

Ikirt House, in East Liverpool, Ohio, was built in 1888. The house is an example of a variety of architectural styles including Second Empire, Eastlake movement, and elements of Queen Anne style architecture. The house was listed in the National Register of Historic Places in May 1980.

Dr. George P. Ikirt (1852-1927) was a surgeon in East Liverpool. He was prominent in Democratic politics and served in the United States House of Representatives from 1893 to 1895.

In 2022, the house was purchased by Michael and Machelle Theis. Over the last year, the couple have been working to restore the property to a small boutique hotel, The Robert House Inn.
