= Potters National Bank =

Potters Bank and Trust Company
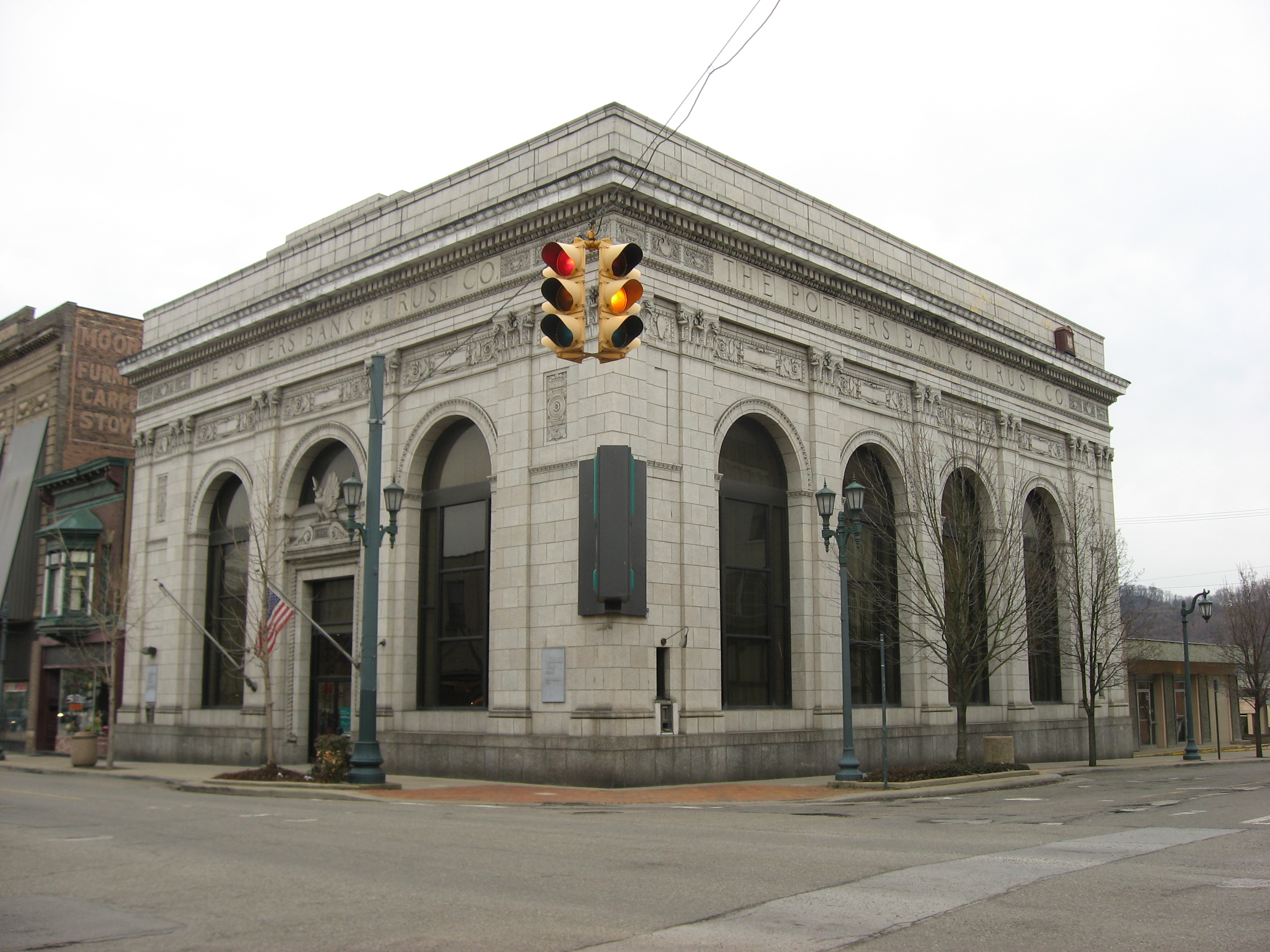
- The Potters National Bank building on E Fifth Street, built in 1924.
- Industry: Regional bank
- Founded: 1881
- Defunct: 1993 (continued operation under Home Savings and Loan Company until 2002)
- Fate: Acquired by National City Corp.
- Headquarters: East Liverpool, Ohio, United States
- Products: commercial and retail banking, mortgage financing and servicing, consumer finance and asset management
- Total assets: $128,251,000 (2001)
- Parent: Ohio Bancorp

- Potters National Bank
- U.S. National Register of Historic Places
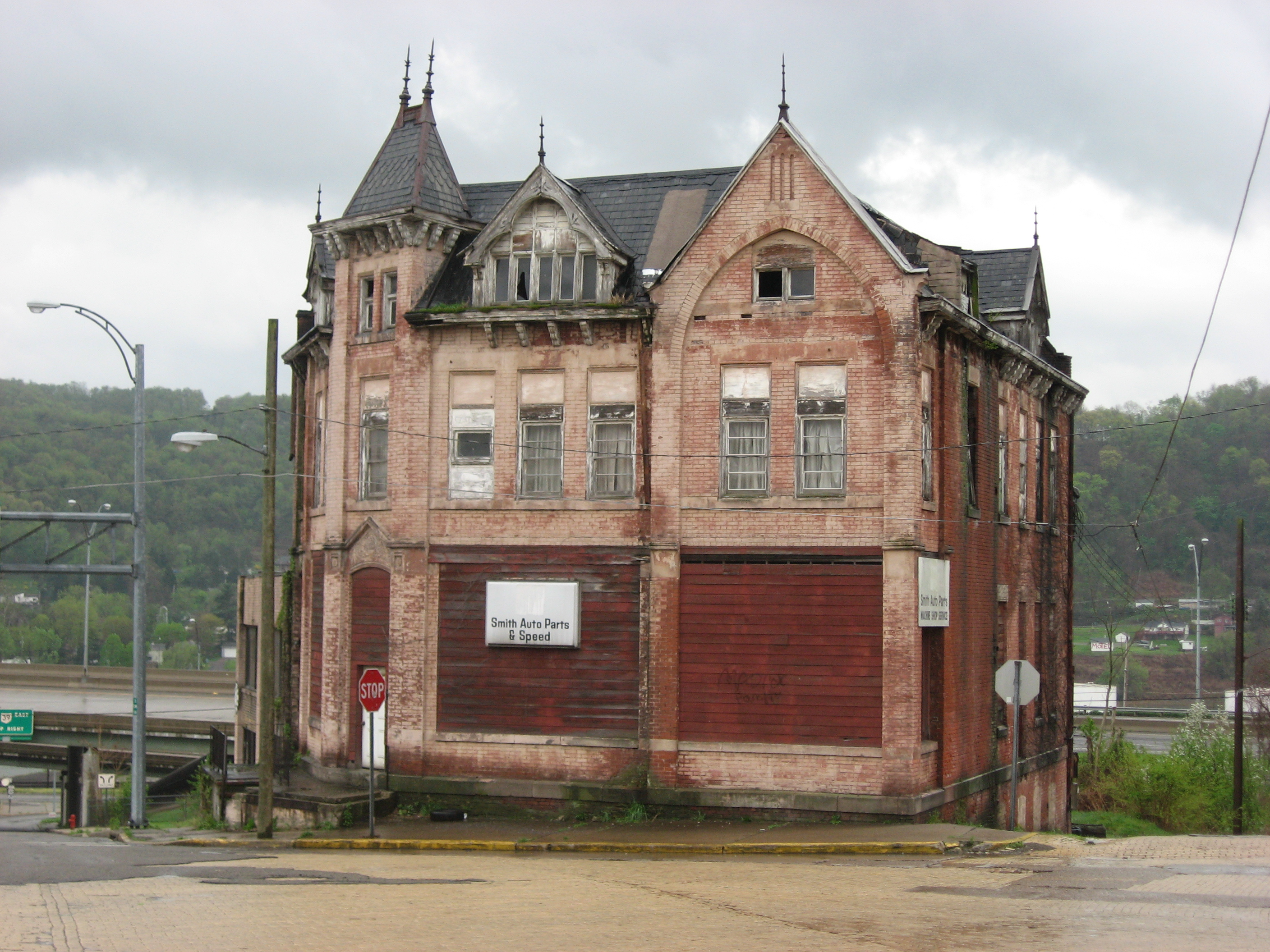
- The original Potters National Bank building (1881) in April 2010

- Location within Ohio Location within the United States
- Location: Broadway and Fourth St., East Liverpool, Ohio
- Coordinates: 40°37′1″N 80°34′40″W
- Area: less than one acre
- Built: 1882
- Architectural style: High Victorian
- MPS: East Liverpool Central Business District MRA
- NRHP reference No.: 85003518
- Added to NRHP: November 14, 1985

The Potters National Bank (also known as the Potters Bank and Trust Company) was a regional bank located in East Liverpool, Ohio, United States. It opened in 1881, and operated until its acquisition by National City Corp. in 1993, as a member bank of Ohio Bancorp.

== History ==
The bank was organized in July 1881 in East Liverpool, Ohio. The first location was in a room on Second Street. The bank was successful and the directors soon purchased property at Broadway and Fourth streets where they built a two-story brick and stone building. The building was occupied by the bank as late as March 1901.

By 1901, the bank moved to a new location on East Fifth Street. The original building was taken over by the East Liverpool Potteries Company while the bank built and occupied their new offices.

In 1924 the bank built occupied a new, larger building where the former 1901 structure was located. The bank directors purchased two additional lots to accommodate the new building. The newer building contained huge basement rooms, committee rooms, and a community room for the public. Construction of this building was begun and completed in 1925. The bank occupied this building in November 1925. Its total cost was $300,000.

== Fate ==
In 1993, National City Corp. purchased Ohio Bancorp of Youngstown, Ohio. The acquisition included five other local banks. The Potters National Bank operated within Home Savings and Loan Company of Youngstown until 2002. The 1924 building has since been used by multiple banking corporations. In 2020, it was restored and converted into a taproom and restaurant called Renovatio's.

The 1881 building was added to the National Register of Historic Places in November 1985. It was demolished in November 2010 due to neglect.
