= Goodwin Baggott Pottery =

- East Liverpool Pottery
- U.S. National Register of Historic Places
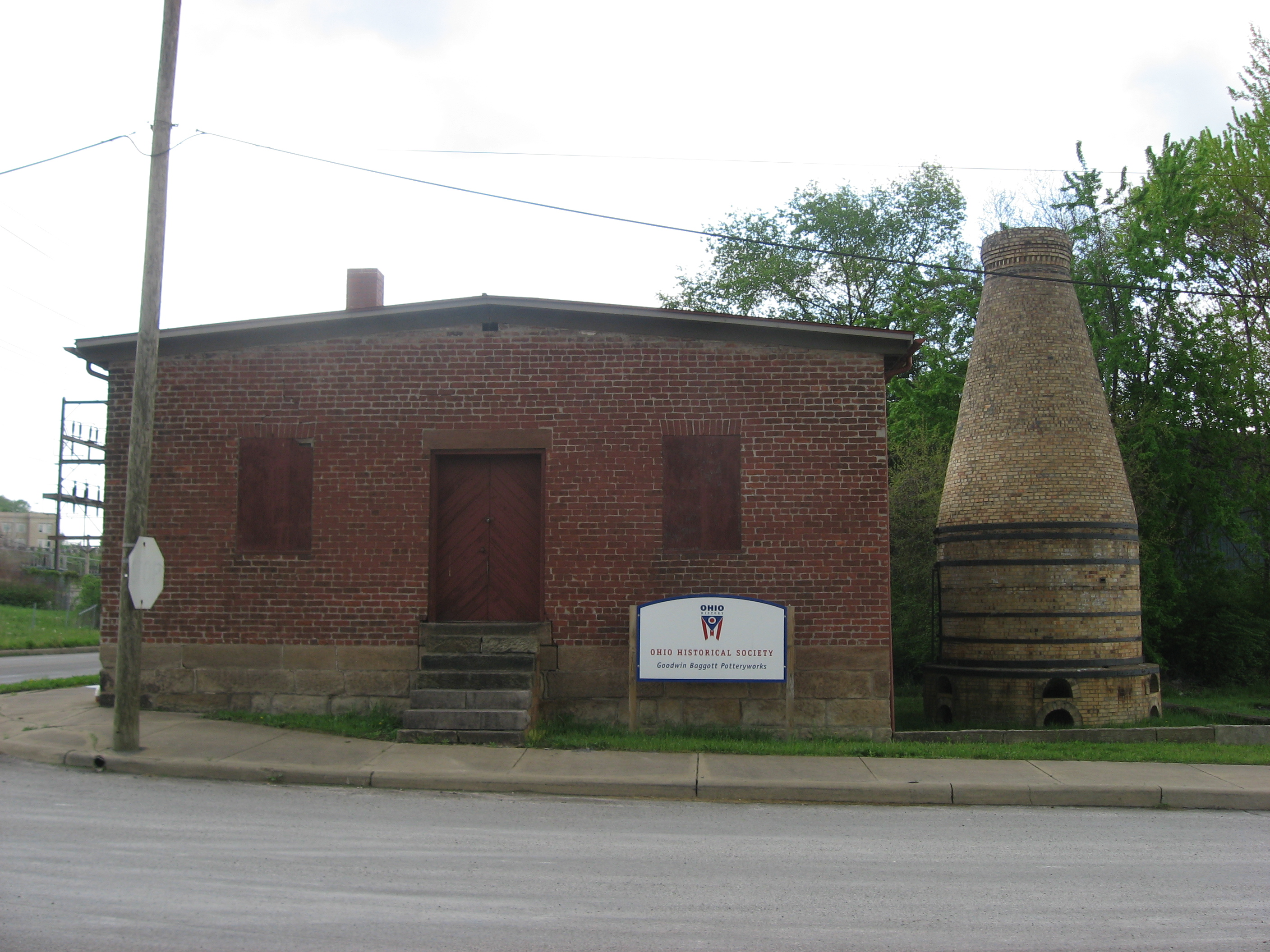
- Goodwin Baggott Pottery building and kiln

- Location within Ohio Location within the United States
- Location: SE corner of 2nd and Market Sts., East Liverpool, Ohio
- Coordinates: 40°36′59″N 80°34′52″W
- Area: less than one acre
- Built: 1844
- NRHP reference No.: 71000636
- Added to NRHP: October 7, 1971

The Goodwin Baggott Pottery operated in East Liverpool, Ohio from its construction in 1844 until it ceased production in 1939. Its main building and bottle kiln were added to the National Register of Historic Places as the East Liverpool Pottery on October 7, 1971.

The site was made up of five buildings and 2 kilns, most of which were razed from 1969 to 1970. The company's bottle kilns were used for the production of pottery ware. The site is operated by the Museum of Ceramics. It is also referred to as the Goodwin-Baggott-Eagle-Mountford Pottery, reflecting its periods of ownership.
