= Museum of Ceramics (East Liverpool, Ohio) =

- East Liverpool Post Office
- U.S. National Register of Historic Places
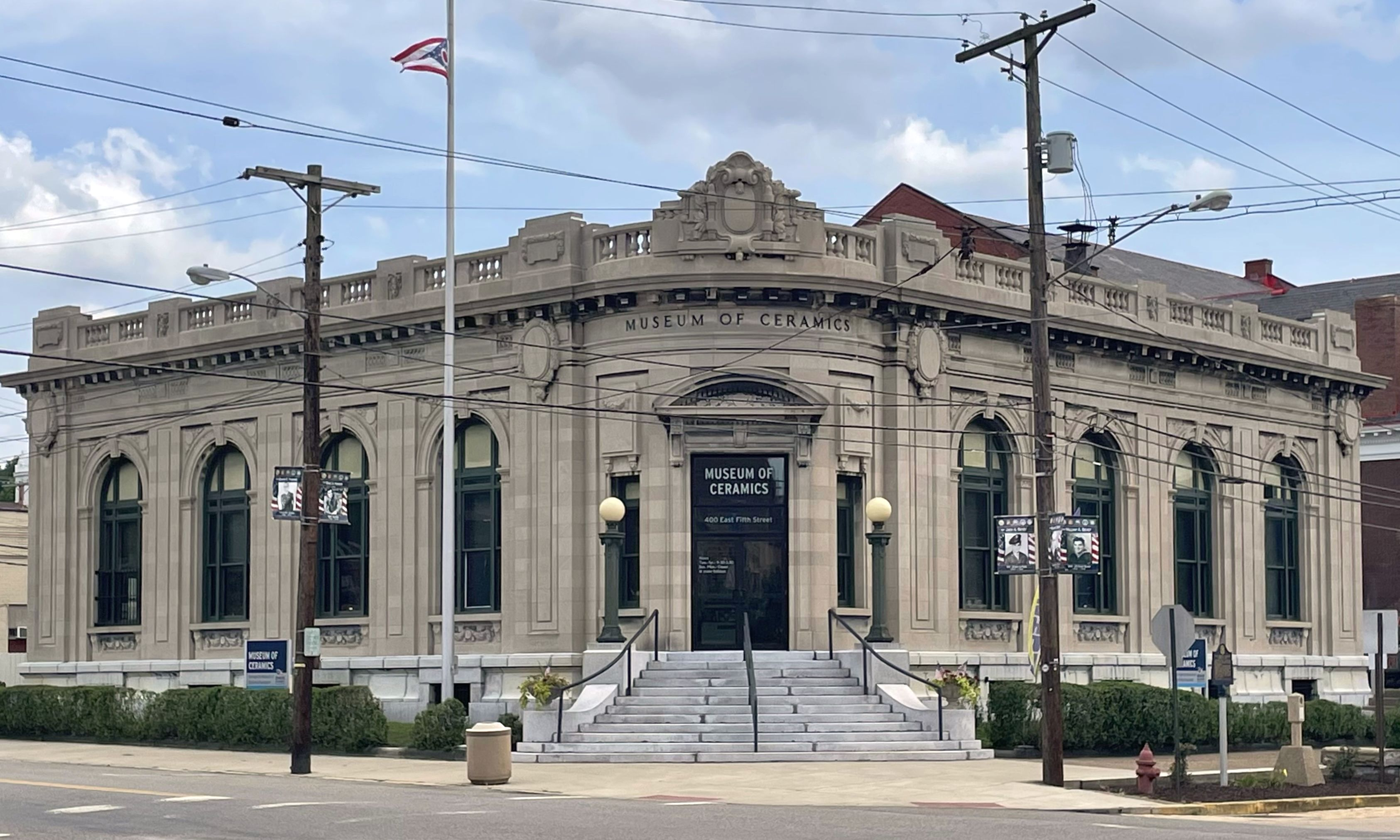
- Front of the museum

- Location within Ohio Location within the United States
- Location: 5th and Broadway Sts., East Liverpool, Ohio
- Coordinates: 40°37′6″N 80°34′38″W
- Built: 1908
- Architect: James Knox Taylor
- Architectural style: Beaux Arts
- NRHP reference No.: 76001384
- Added to NRHP: November 21, 1976

The Museum of Ceramics, housed in the former East Liverpool Post Office, is a ceramics museum that contains an extensive collection of ceramic wares produced in and around East Liverpool, Ohio, United States. The museum is operated by a Museum of Ceramics Foundation and by the Ohio History Connection in a city long known as "America's Crockery City" and "The Pottery Capital of the Nation."

== Description ==
The Museum of Ceramics is dedicated to the preservation of the rich pottery history of the East Liverpool area. During the late 19th century and early 20th century, the East Liverpool area produced over 50% of the nation's ceramic output. Over 200 pottery factories have operated in and around East Liverpool, starting in the 1840s, when the English potter James Bennett established the area's first commercial pottery. James Bennett was the elder brother of Edwin Bennett of Baltimore.

The museum contains the largest public display of Lotus Ware, an award-winning fine porcelain ware produced only for a short period in the 1890s by the Knowles, Taylor, Knowles pottery of East Liverpool. Also on display are collections of early Rockingham Pottery, ironstone, whiteware, yellow ware, and Victorian majolica. Other highlights are Homer Laughlin's Fiesta dinnerware, Hall China's Donut teapot, and William Bloor's 1860s Parian Ware, along with Craven Art Pottery vases. Related displays on East Liverpool's social, political and economic history show the impact of the industry on the community and the nation. As of 2024, Susan Weaver is director of the museum.

The Goodwin Baggott Pottery is operated by the Museum of Ceramics.

== Building ==
The museum occupies the former United States post office, a Beaux-Arts structure designed by architect James Knox Taylor and built in 1909. The building was listed on the National Register of Historic Places on November 21, 1976.

The main lobby features a post office mural by Ohio artist Roland Schweinsburg, titled Old Bennett Pottery Plant (1936). The large 15-foot lunette was commissioned by the Treasury Relief Art Project.
