= Travelers Hotel =

- U.S. National Register of Historic Places
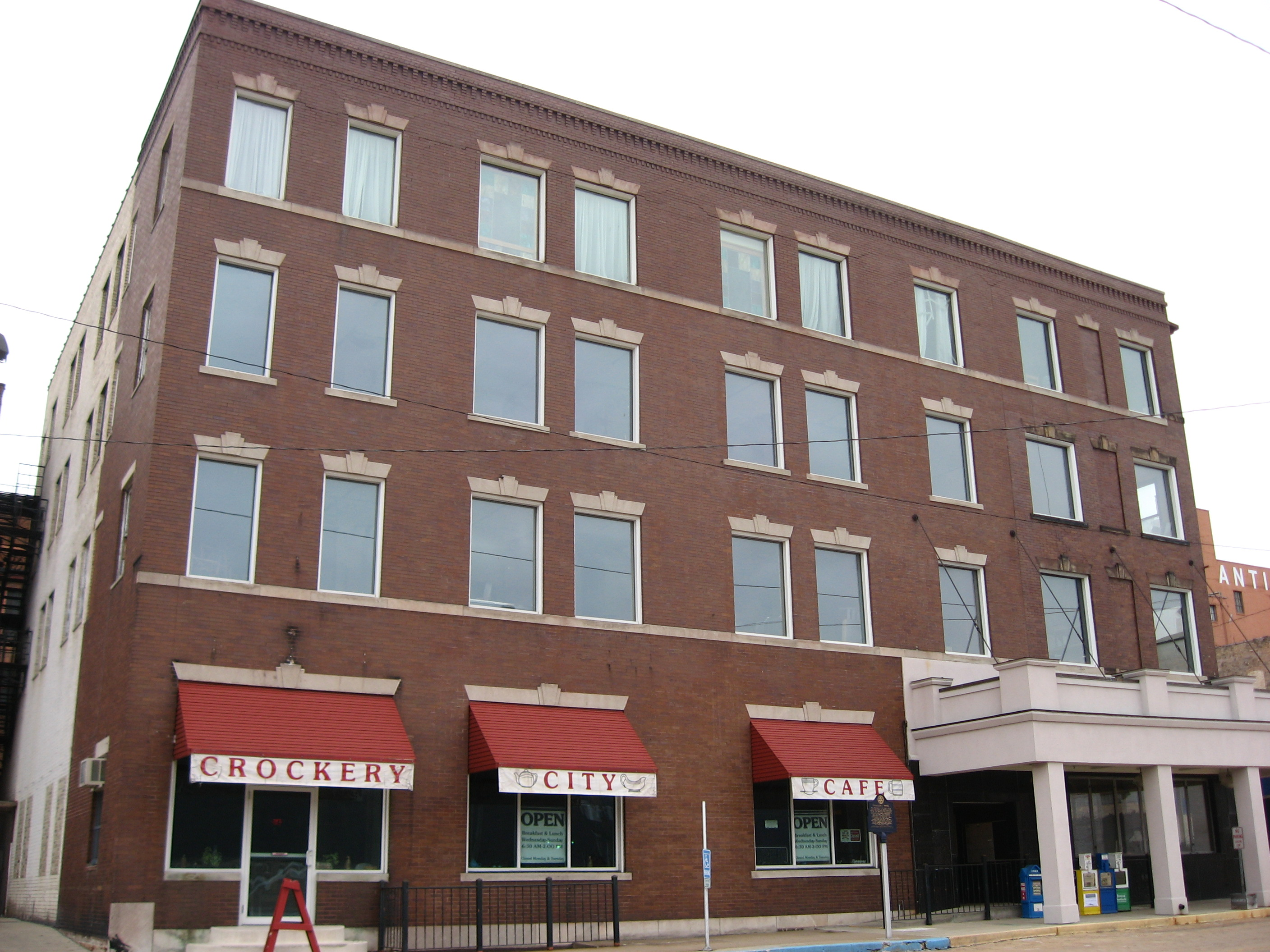
- The Travelers Hotel, East Liverpool, Ohio

- Location within Ohio Location within the United States
- Location: 115 E. Fourth St., East Liverpool, Ohio
- Coordinates: 40°37′5″N 80°34′48″W
- Area: less than one acre
- Built: 1908
- Architect: Metsch, Cassius
- MPS: East Liverpool Central Business District MRA
- NRHP reference No.: 86001718
- Added to NRHP: July 15, 1986

The Travelers Hotel, in East Liverpool, Ohio, was built in 1907 and had 105 rooms. Located at 117 East Fourth Street, on the banks of the Ohio River, it is one of the few remaining river town hotels that faces the river. The original name of the hotel is the Landora.

== History ==
The hotel, which opened in 1908, was designed by Cassius Metsch, a local architect who also designed the YMCA building in East Liverpool. The hotel's entrance was originally on the corner of Crook Alley and East Fourth Street.

In 1910, a banquet room and kitchen were added. A rear wing of the building was added in 1915. In 1927, a kitchen and the 'Jigger' room were constructed. The hotel also maintained a "Sample Room". In this area, traveling salesmen could display samples of their products. The Sample Room is now a small banquet room.

== Notable guests ==
The Ceramic Theater was across the street from the hotel and performers at the theater would often stay at the hotel while in town. The hotel hosted Blackstone the magician, Paul Whiteman, the Marine Band, and the Roger Wagner Chorale.

In 1934, during the hunt for Pretty Boy Floyd (who was killed in nearby Clarkson, Ohio), FBI Special Agent Melvin Purvis used the Travelers Hotel as his headquarters.

== Renovation ==
The hotel was renovated in the 1980s. As part of the historical renovation of the hotel, items from a number of local buildings were used. The lobby lights were from the Moore building and the brass door guards and handles were taken from the King-Ealls Hardware building.

The hotel was listed on the National Register of Historic Places in July 1986.
