= Homer Laughlin House =

- U.S. National Register of Historic Places
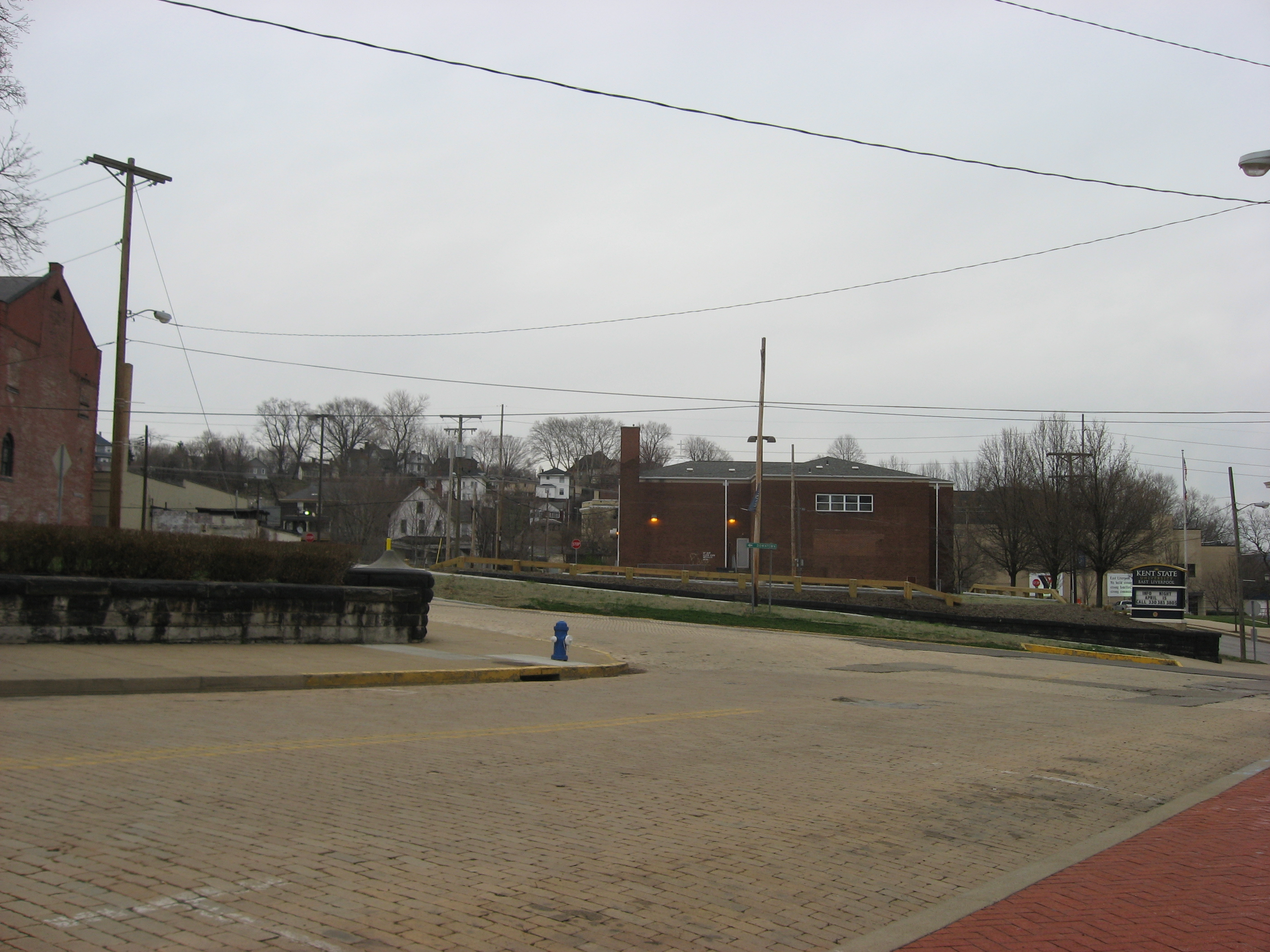
- Site of the house

- Location within Ohio Location within the United States
- Location: 414 Broadway, East Liverpool, Ohio
- Coordinates: 40°37′3″N 80°34′38″W
- Area: less than one acre
- Built: 1882
- Architectural style: Queen Anne
- MPS: East Liverpool Central Business District MRA
- NRHP reference No.: 85003513
- Added to NRHP: November 14, 1985

The Homer Laughlin House was located in East Liverpool, Ohio. It was built in 1882 by Homer Laughlin, a prominent pottery manufacturer and founder of the Homer Laughlin China Company.

The house was unique in that it makes use of architectural terra cotta, produced in East Liverpool. In 1916 the house was bought by the Fraternal Order of Eagles. The house was later destroyed to build a parking lot. The property was added to the National Register of Historic Places in 1985.
