= Mary A. Patterson Memorial =

- Patterson, Mary A., Memorial
- U.S. National Register of Historic Places
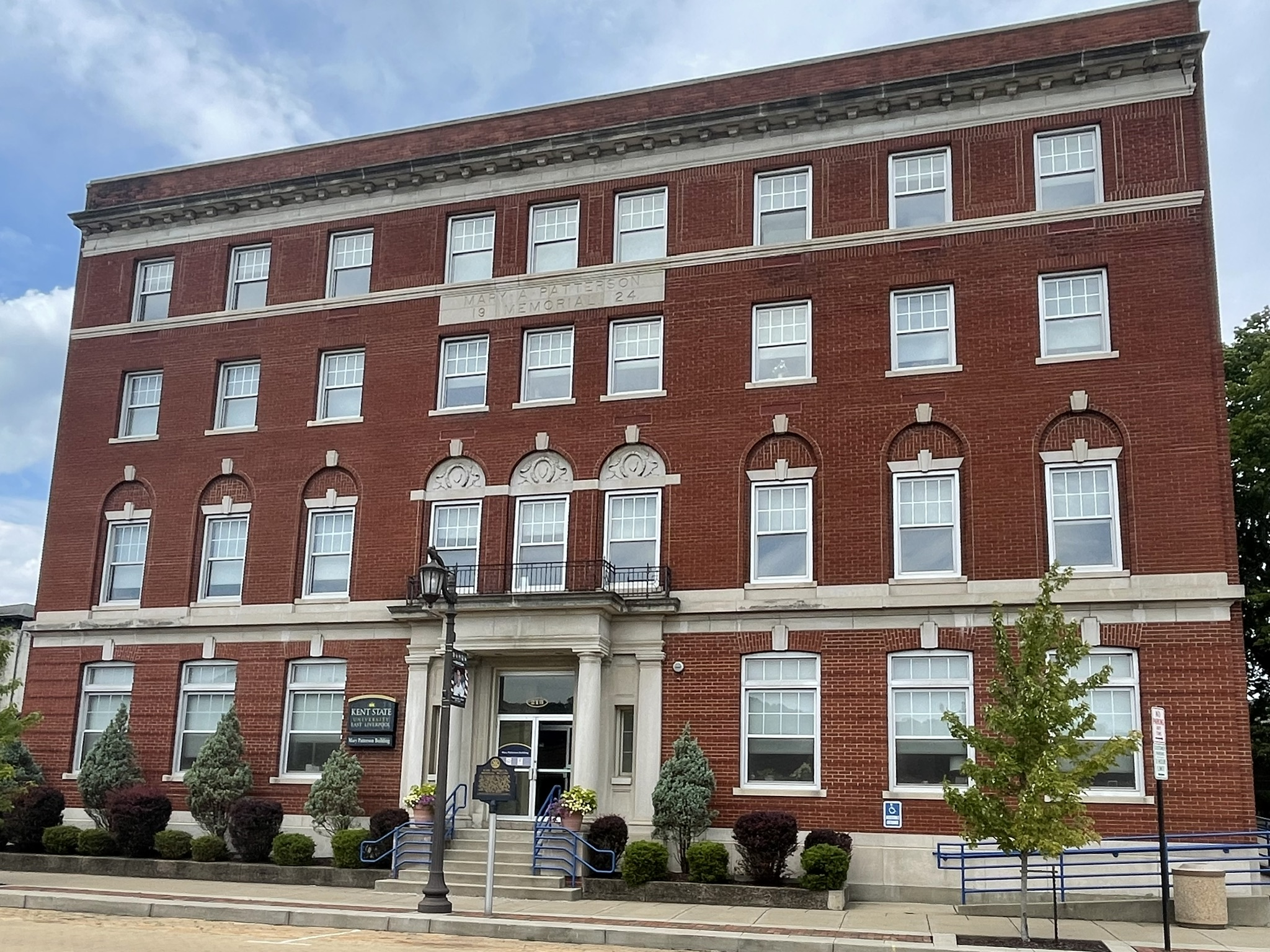
- Entrance to the Patterson, Mary A., Memorial in downtown East Liverpool, Ohio

- Location within Ohio Location within the United States
- Location: E. Fourth St., East Liverpool, Ohio
- Coordinates: 40°37′3″N 80°34′42″W
- Area: less than one acre
- Built: 1924
- Architectural style: Late 19th And 20th Century Revivals, Renaissance Revival
- MPS: East Liverpool Central Business District MRA
- NRHP reference No.: 85003516
- Added to NRHP: November 14, 1985

The Mary A. Patterson Memorial building was built in 1924 by East Liverpool, Ohio industrialist Monroe Patterson as a memorial to his late wife, Mary Patterson. The structure was a home for working women from 1932 until 1984. It is now part of Kent State University and functions as a learning center featuring a community room and an art gallery.

The building was added to the National Register of Historic Places on November 14, 1985

== Monroe Patterson ==
Monroe Patterson came to East Liverpool from Ironton where he was in the general contracting business. After arriving, Mr. Patterson along with his brother-in-law, Phillip Morley opened a foundry. At first the foundry manufactured light equipment and serviced the potteries and other clay industries.

Mr. Patterson married Mary A. Thompson of Smith's Ferry, Pa. in September 1883. The couple had two children but both died in infancy. Mr. and Mrs. Patterson were generous benefactors to many different activities in the community. Often their-donations were anonymous.

After the sudden death of his wife in 1921, Monroe decided to build a good Christian home for working girls that would serve the needs of the community and would also be a fitting memorial to his wife.

Articles of Incorporation were drawn up for the Mary A. Patterson Memorial Christian Home Association. Monroe supervised the initial stages of the construction himself. However, he died in 1924 before the work was completed.

The shell of the building was completed in 1925 but the interior was not finished till 1932 after many delays and problems in the construction.

The building was erected at a cost of $315,000. It is 84 feet by 124 feet. The white tiled swimming pool in the basement is 60 feet by 22 feet.

In 1932 forty bedrooms, the lounge, and two small writing rooms were furnished, and the home was opened to the public. The first executive secretary received a monthly salary of $60.00. The first swimming instructor was paid $12.50 a week. A fee of 25 cents per person was charged for using the pool with an additional seven cents for a towel and one cent for soap. For several years there was a dining room on the lower floor.

By 1952 there were 116 furnished rooms, a lounge, and an auditorium. Many organizations in the community used the auditorium for meetings, receptions and recitals. The Red Cross and the Columbiana County Motor Club both held office space on the first floor for many years.

As more apartments in the community became available for women, and the building became older and less attractive and less equipped to meet the need of young people, the occupancy rate began to go down. Many of the retired women were able to move to senior housing. The cost of repairs and renovation was much too high for the board to handle and the trustees of the building realized that they could not keep the building open. The building closed in 1984.

== Kent State University ==
After the building had been closed for one year, it reverted to the Patterson heirs. The Mary Patterson Building was purchased by the Friends of the East Liverpool Campus (of Kent State University) in 1989 and was partially renovated in 1993. In 1996, $956,000 was raised from the community to transform the building into a state-of-the-art learning center. In addition to the private donations, Kent State University and the State of Ohio contributed a total of $2 million in additional funds to complete the project. The building was re-opened in May 2000.
