= City Hall (East Liverpool, Ohio) =

- U.S. National Register of Historic Places
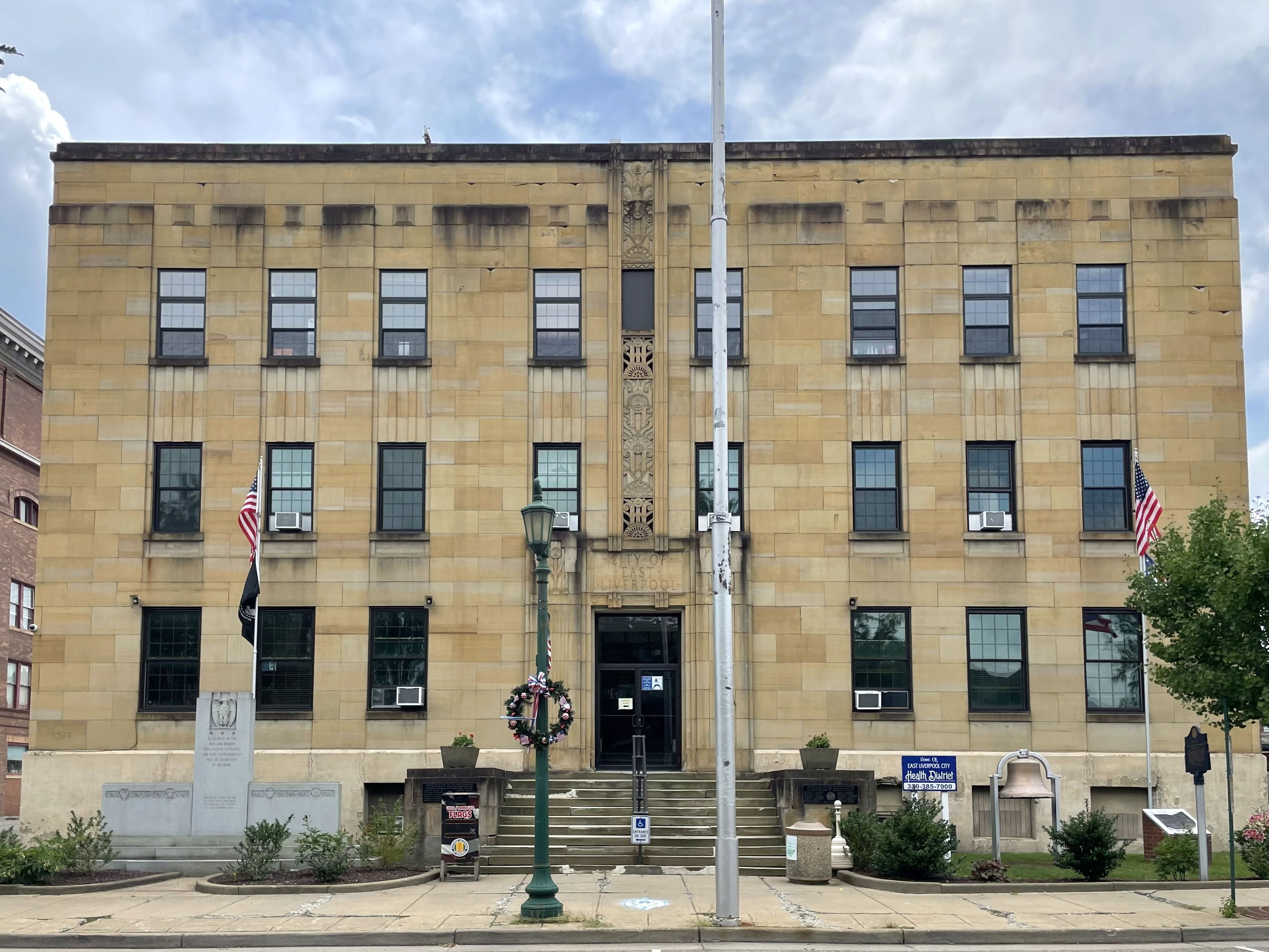
- Entrance to the East Liverpool City Hall

- Location within Ohio Location within the United States
- Location: Sixth St., East Liverpool, Ohio
- Coordinates: 40°37′12″N 80°34′51″W
- Area: less than one acre
- Built: 1934
- Architect: Charles Frederick Owsley
- Architectural style: Art Deco
- MPS: East Liverpool Central Business District MRA
- NRHP reference No.: 85003511
- Added to NRHP: November 14, 1985

The City Hall in East Liverpool, Ohio is part of the East Liverpool Central Business District multiple resource area (MRA). It was added to the National Register of Historic Places on November 14, 1985.

East Liverpool's City Hall was built in 1934 as a project of the Civil Works Administration. Stylistically, the building is an example of Art Deco architecture that was prominent in the 1930s. The two-story structure is constructed with sandstone.
