= East Fifth Street Historic District (East Liverpool, Ohio) =

Historic district in Ohio, United States

- U.S. National Register of Historic Places
- U.S. Historic district
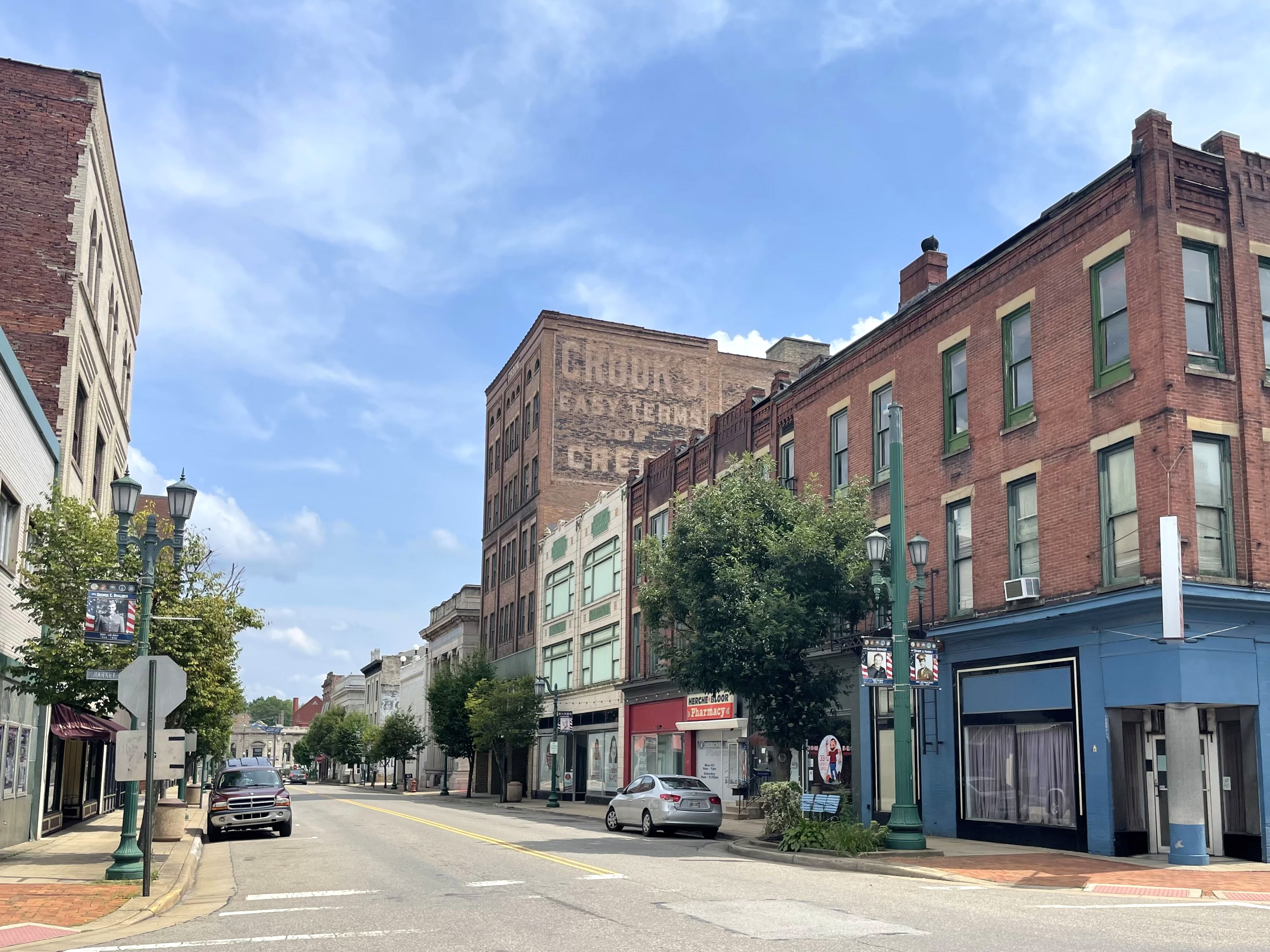
- Looking eastward along Fifth Street from the Market Street intersection in downtown East Liverpool, Ohio

- Location within Ohio Location within the United States
- Location: Along E. Fifth St. between Market St. and Broadway, East Liverpool, Ohio
- Coordinates: 40°37′7″N 80°34′42″W
- Area: 4 acres (1.6 ha)
- Architectural style: Classical Revival, Mixed (more Than 2 Styles From Different Periods)
- MPS: East Liverpool Central Business District MRA
- NRHP reference No.: 85003510
- Added to NRHP: November 14, 1985

The East Fifth Street Historic District, located in East Liverpool, Ohio, was added to the National Register of Historic Places in November 1985. The district encompasses three blocks (4 acres (1.6 ha)) of downtown East Liverpool along East Fifth street between Market Street and Broadway.

The district is significant because of its central position in the growing commerce of East Liverpool during the 19th and early 20th centuries as well as for its examples of Classic Revival architecture. Restoration of the former J.C. Penney Building, also known as the BOSS Building, began in 2024 as part of a $1.2 million incentive received from the state government.
