= East Liverpool, Ohio =

- City
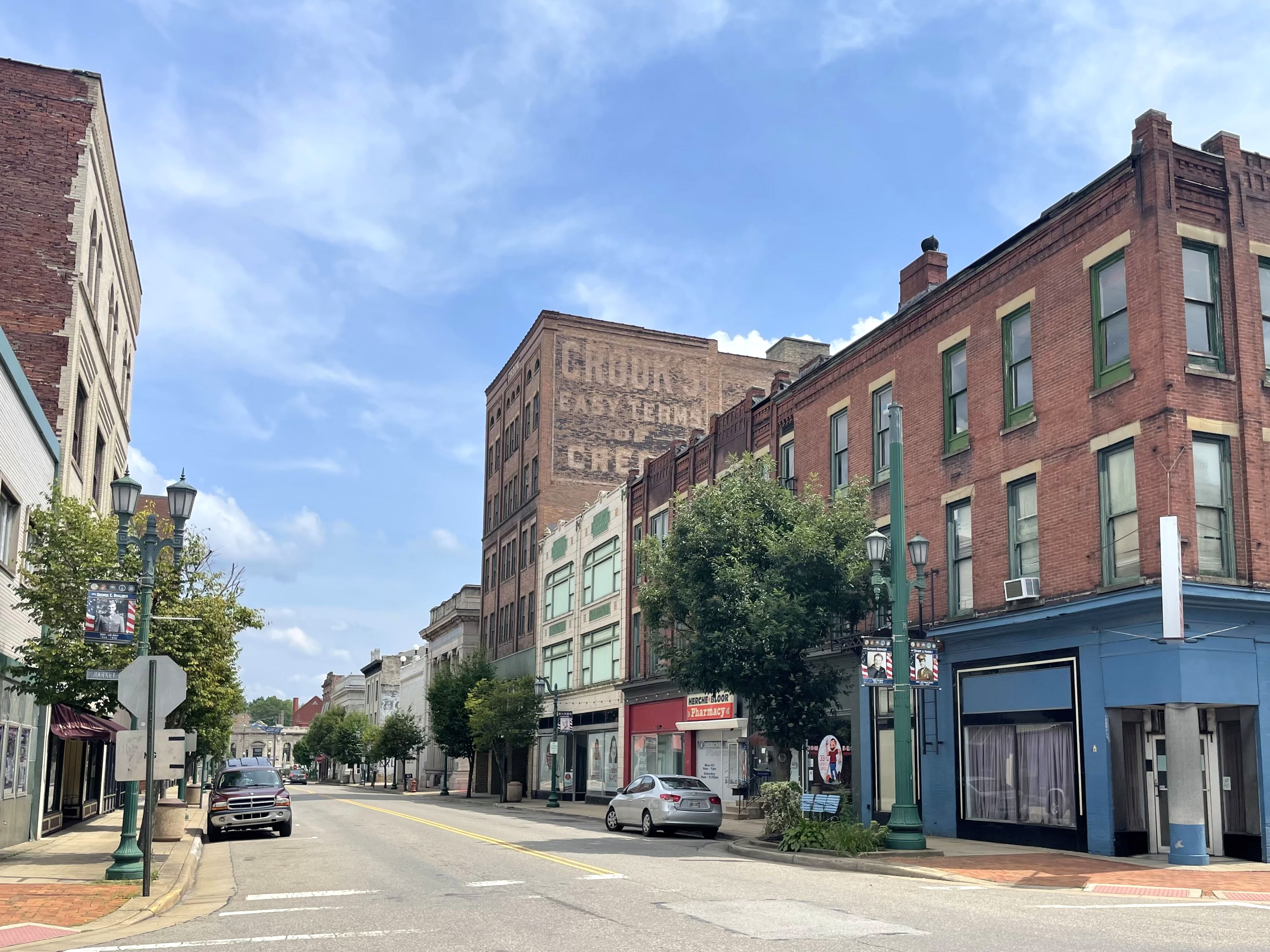
- East Fifth Street Historic District
- Nicknames: Pottery Capital of the World, Crockery City
- Motto: "We're Open for Business"
- Interactive map of East Liverpool, Ohio
- Location within Ohio Location within the United States
- Coordinates: 40°37′43″N 80°34′19″W
- Country: United States
- State: Ohio
- County: Columbiana
- Founded: 1802
- Named for: Liverpool, England

Government
  - Type: Mayor–council
  - Mayor: Robert J. Smith
  - Council President: John A. Torma

Area
  - Total: 4.90 sq mi (12.68 km^{2})
  - Land: 4.70 sq mi (12.18 km^{2})
  - Water: 0.20 sq mi (0.51 km^{2})
- Elevation: 965 ft (294 m)

Population (2020)
  - Total: 9,958
  - Estimate (2023): 9,705
  - Density: 2,118.2/sq mi (817.86/km^{2})
- Time zone: UTC−5 (Eastern (EST))
  - Summer (DST): UTC−4 (EDT)
- ZIP code: 43920
- Area code: 330, 234
- FIPS code: 39-23730
- GNIS feature ID: 1085891
- School District: East Liverpool City SD
- Website: http://www.eastliverpool.com/

East Liverpool is a city in Columbiana County, Ohio, United States. The population was 9,958 at the 2020 census. It lies along the Ohio River at the convergence of the Ohio, Pennsylvania, and West Virginia borders, about 30 miles (48 km) from both Pittsburgh and Youngstown. The city is most notable for its pottery industry, which was at one time the largest in the US.

== History ==
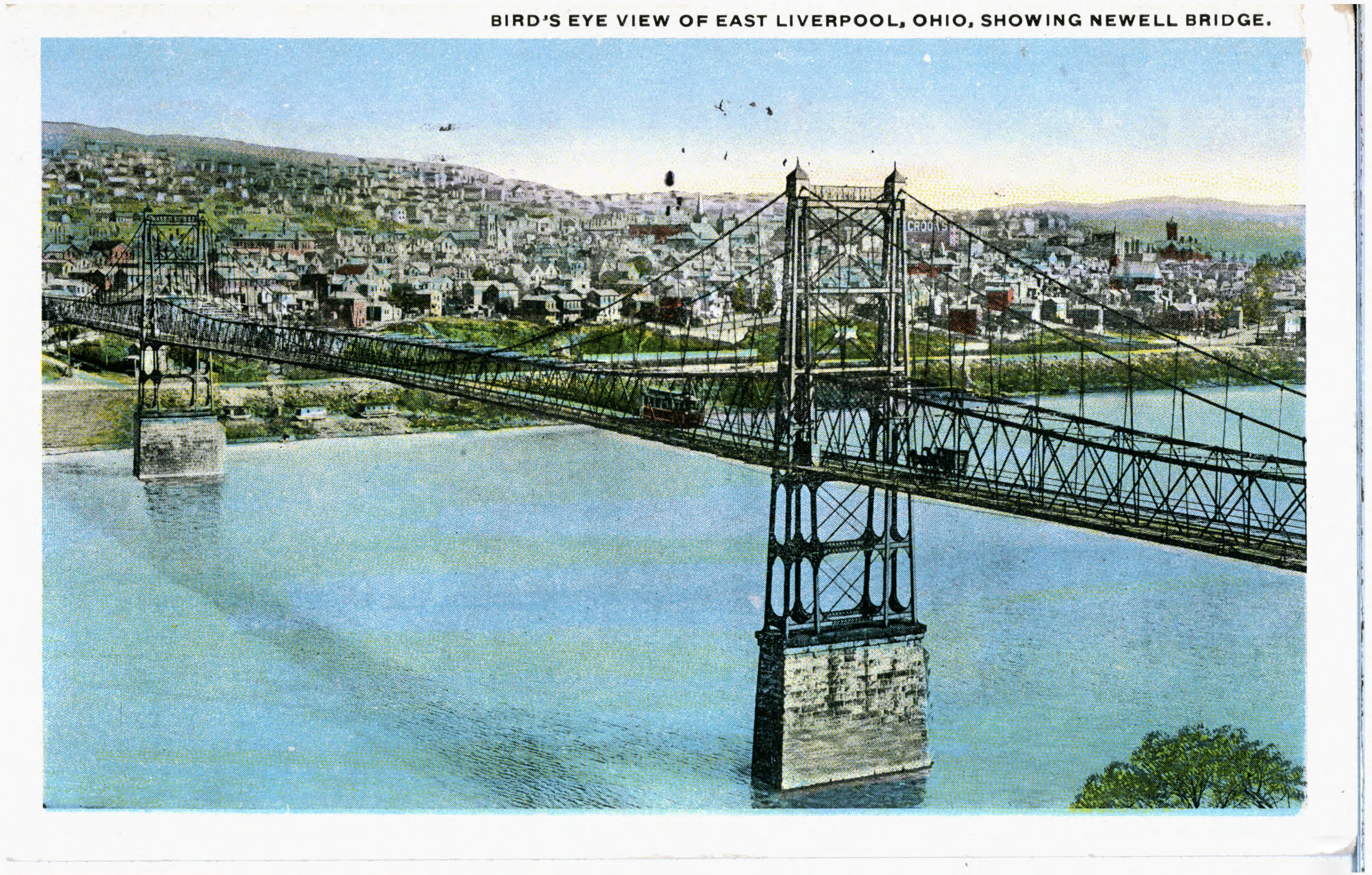
Bird's eye view of East Liverpool in 1920, with the Wayne Six Toll Bridge at front

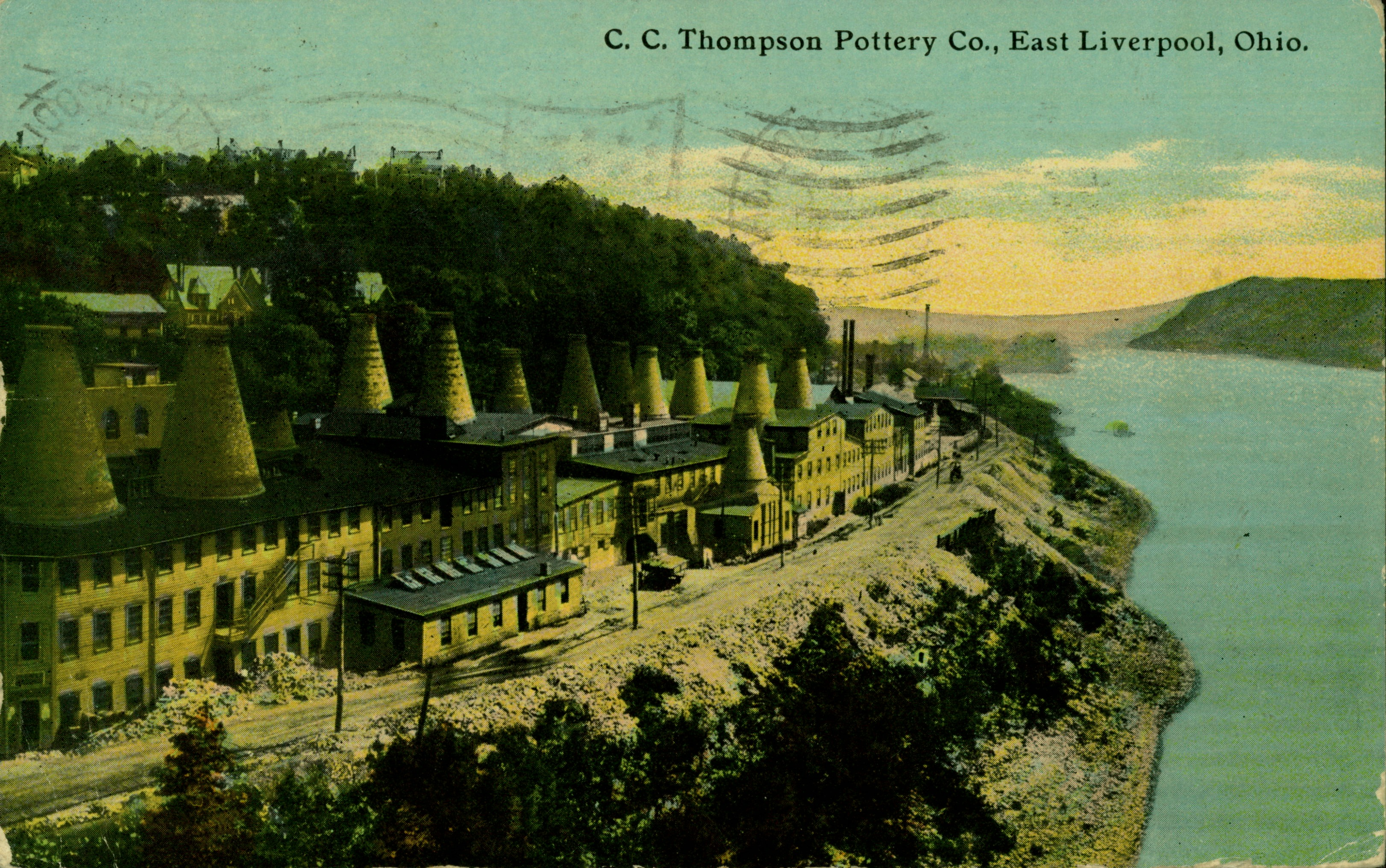
C.C. Thompson Pottery c. 1912

Native American petroglyphs exist in the area surrounding East Liverpool, including on Babbs Island and near the Little Beaver Creek. Before the arrival of European Americans, Mingo, Lenape, and Wyandot peoples lived in the area until the Battle of Fallen Timbers led to the Ohio Country's colonization by European-Americans.

The Public Land Survey System of the United States was established by Congressional legislation in 1785 to provide an orderly mechanism for opening the Northwest Territory for settlement. The ordinance directed the Geographer of the United States, Thomas Hutchins, to survey an initial east–west baseline. Hutchins began in 1786, using as his starting point a stake on the north bank of the Ohio River placed by a 1785 survey team from Virginia and Pennsylvania to fix their common north–south boundary. Hutchins' work, completed in 1787, established the Seven Ranges. This survey is believed to be "the first mathematically designed system and nationally conducted cadastral survey in any modern country" and is memorialized by the Beginning Point of the U.S. Public Land Survey monument.

East Liverpool traces its founding to 1798 when Irish immigrant Thomas Fawcett purchased 1,100 acres of land along the Ohio River in what was then Jefferson County. In 1802, he platted the town of St. Clair, named for territorial governor Arthur St. Clair. It was called Fawcettstown for a time before being renamed Liverpool in 1816, after the port city of Liverpool, England. Over its first few decades, a grist mill, multiple stores, and wharves opened in the town. The first schoolhouse opened in 1820, and the first religious center opened in 1834 when an Episcopal Church was established on a 4th Street site provided by town developers. Liverpool was incorporated as East Liverpool in 1834 to avoid confusion with Liverpool Township, Medina County, Ohio.

Although Pittsburgh-based entrepreneurs invested in the town, it was smaller during this period than the nearby towns of New Lisbon and Wellsville. The arrival of English potter James Bennett in 1839 brought the establishment of the first bottle kiln site in East Liverpool, launching the town's largest industry and bringing in multiple waves of Western European immigration throughout the late 19th century. Another large employer outside of the pottery industry was the Crucible Steel Company in nearby Midland, Pennsylvania. By 1880, East Liverpool had grown to be the largest city in the county, and it reached over 20,000 residents before 1910.

In 1905, the first city hospital opened. As of 1914, East Liverpool was served by the Cleveland and Pittsburgh Railroad. On October 22, 1934, local police and FBI agents led by Melvin Purvis shot and killed notorious bank robber Pretty Boy Floyd in a cornfield north of town after Floyd fled East Liverpool, and his body was returned to the town for embalming.

The western downtown area was cleared in the 1960s to make way for the 4-lane expansion of Ohio State Route 11. The city reached its peak population of more than 26,000 in 1970, but its pottery industry had already begun to decline by the mid-1960s. As with other industries, production moved to developing countries where labor costs were cheaper. This cost many jobs and, ultimately, population in the Upper Ohio Valley area, as people moved away in search of work. Many of the city's downtown businesses withdrew to strip malls in nearby Calcutta or left the area outright.

In the mid-1990s, the city renovated its downtown district. To improve its urban design, it installed Depression-era lightposts, developed a new center called Devon's Diamond, and reconstructed the old high school's clock tower. In 2010, East Liverpool lost its position as the most populous city in the county to Salem after 130 years and was later withdrawn from being a principal city in the micropolitan area. Restoration of two buildings in the Diamond Historic District and East Fifth Street Historic District began in 2024 as part of a $1.2 million incentive received from the state government.

== Geography ==
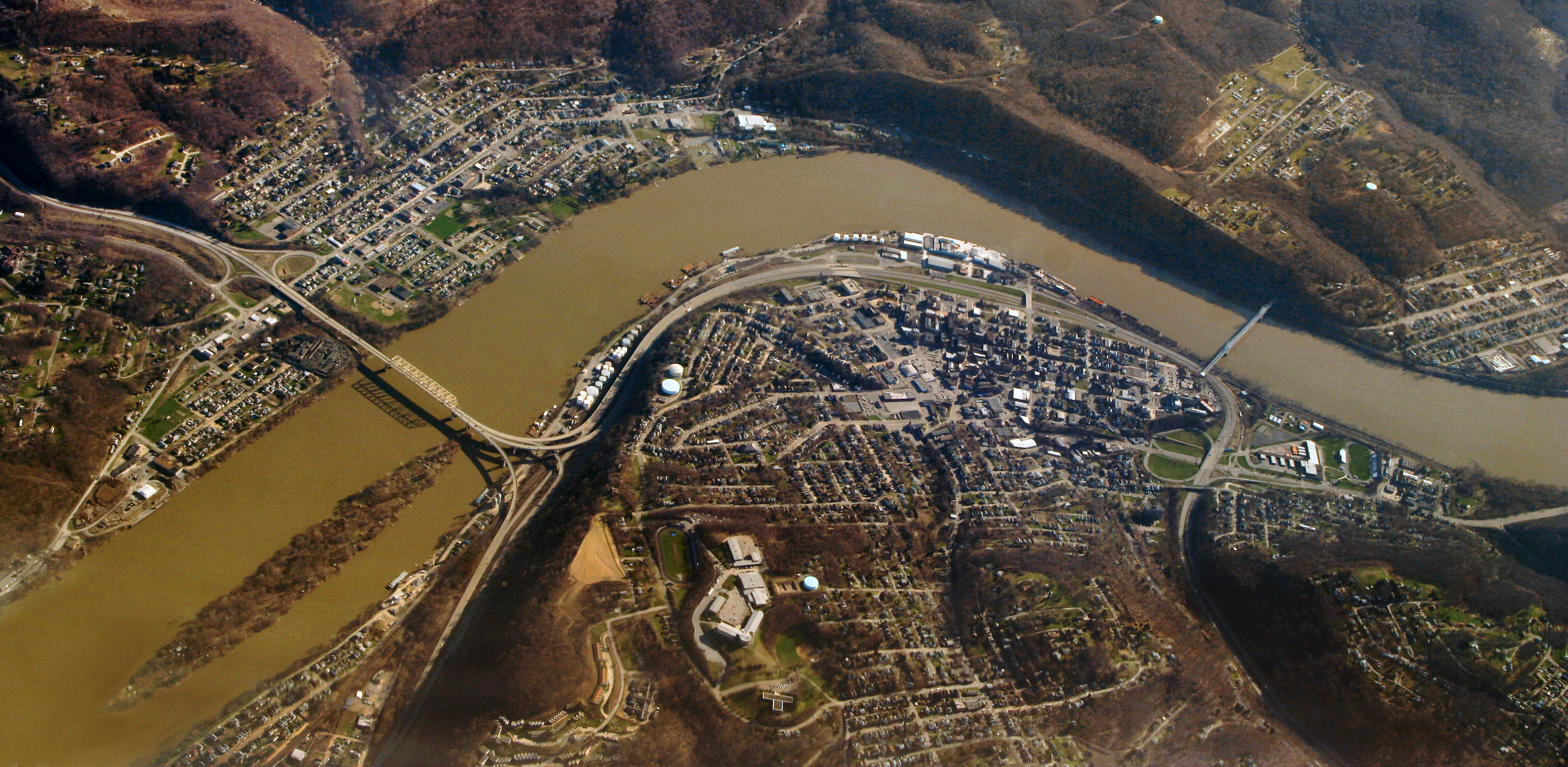
East Liverpool and vicinity, including Chester, West Virginia

According to the United States Census Bureau, the city has an area of 4.76 square miles (12.33 km^{2}), of which 4.56 square miles (11.81 km^{2}) is land and 0.20 square miles (0.52 km^{2}) is water.

Neighborhoods include:

- Beechwood
- Downtown
- East End
- Fisher Park
- Klondyke
- Pleasant Heights
- Thompson
- West End
- Sunnyside
- Jethro

== Demographics ==
Historical population
Census	Pop.	Note	%±
1830	136		—
1840	503		269.9%
1850	987		96.2%
1860	1,308		32.5%
1870	2,105		60.9%
1880	5,568		164.5%
1890	10,956		96.8%
1900	16,485		50.5%
1910	20,387		23.7%
1920	21,411		5.0%
1930	23,329		9.0%
1940	23,555		1.0%
1950	24,217		2.8%
1960	22,306		−7.9%
1970	26,243		17.6%
1980	16,517		−37.1%
1990	13,654		−17.3%
2000	13,089		−4.1%
2010	11,195		−14.5%
2020	9,958		−11.0%
2025 (est.)	9,569		−3.9%

=== 2020 census ===
As of the 2020 census, East Liverpool had a population of 9,958. The median age was 38.7 years. 24.1% of residents were under the age of 18 and 16.6% of residents were 65 years of age or older. For every 100 females there were 92.6 males, and for every 100 females age 18 and over there were 89.6 males age 18 and over.

99.5% of residents lived in urban areas, while 0.5% lived in rural areas.

There were 4,243 households in East Liverpool, of which 28.8% had children under the age of 18 living in them. Of all households, 32.1% were married-couple households, 22.2% were households with a male householder and no spouse or partner present, and 35.8% were households with a female householder and no spouse or partner present. About 34.9% of all households were made up of individuals and 13.9% had someone living alone who was 65 years of age or older.

There were 4,970 housing units, of which 14.6% were vacant. The homeowner vacancy rate was 3.5% and the rental vacancy rate was 10.7%.

Racial composition as of the 2020 census
Race	Number	Percent
White	8,730	87.7%
Black or African American	461	4.6%
American Indian and Alaska Native	30	0.3%
Asian	26	0.3%
Native Hawaiian and Other Pacific Islander	1	0.0%
Some other race	39	0.4%
Two or more races	671	6.7%
Hispanic or Latino (of any race)	124	1.2%

=== 2010 census ===
As of the census of 2010, there were 11,195 people, 4,601 households, and 2,892 families residing in the city. The population density was 2,455.0 inhabitants per square mile (947.9/km^{2}). There were 5,316 housing units at an average density of 1,165.8 per square mile (450.1/km^{2}). The racial makeup of the city was 91.7% White, 4.6% African American, 0.2% Native American, 0.2% Asian, 0.3% from other races, and 3.0% from two or more races. Hispanic or Latino people of any race were 1.1% of the population.

There were 4,601 households, of which 33.4% had children under the age of 18 living with them, 36.0% were married couples living together, 20.1% had a female householder with no husband present, 6.7% had a male householder with no wife present, and 37.1% were non-families. 31.9% of all households were made up of individuals, and 11.9% had someone living alone who was 65 years of age or older. The average household size was 2.39 and the average family size was 2.97.

The median age in the city was 37.6 years. 25.4% of residents were under the age of 18; 9.5% were between the ages of 18 and 24; 24% were from 25 to 44; 26.5% were from 45 to 64; and 14.6% were 65 years of age or older. The gender makeup of the city was 47.6% male and 52.4% female.

=== 2000 census ===
As of the census of 2000, there were 13,089 people, 5,261 households, and 3,424 families residing in the city. The population density was 3,010.3 inhabitants per square mile (1,162.3/km^{2}). There were 5,743 housing units at an average density of 1,320.8 per square mile (510.0/km^{2}). The racial makeup of the city was 92.85% White, 4.81% African American, 0.24% Native American, 0.08% Asian, 0.05% Pacific Islander, 0.21% from other races, and 1.76% from two or more races. Hispanic or Latino people of any race were 0.72% of the population.

There were 5,261 households, out of which 32.9% had children under the age of 18 living with them, 43.5% were married couples living together, 16.6% had a female householder with no husband present, and 34.9% were non-families. 30.3% of all households were made up of individuals, and 13.5% had someone living alone who was 65 years of age or older. The average household size was 2.44 and the average family size was 3.01.

In the city the population was spread out, with 27.1% under the age of 18, 8.8% from 18 to 24, 27.3% from 25 to 44, 20.8% from 45 to 64, and 16.0% who were 65 years of age or older. The median age was 36 years. For every 100 females, there were 86.5 males. For every 100 females age 18 and over, there were 81.8 males.

The median income for a household in the city was $23,138, and the median income for a family was $27,500. Males had a median income of $27,346 versus $18,990 for females. The per capita income for the city was $12,656. About 21.5% of families and 25.2% of the population were below the poverty line, including 35.2% of those under age 18 and 13.0% of those age 65 or over.

== Economy ==
=== Pottery industry ===
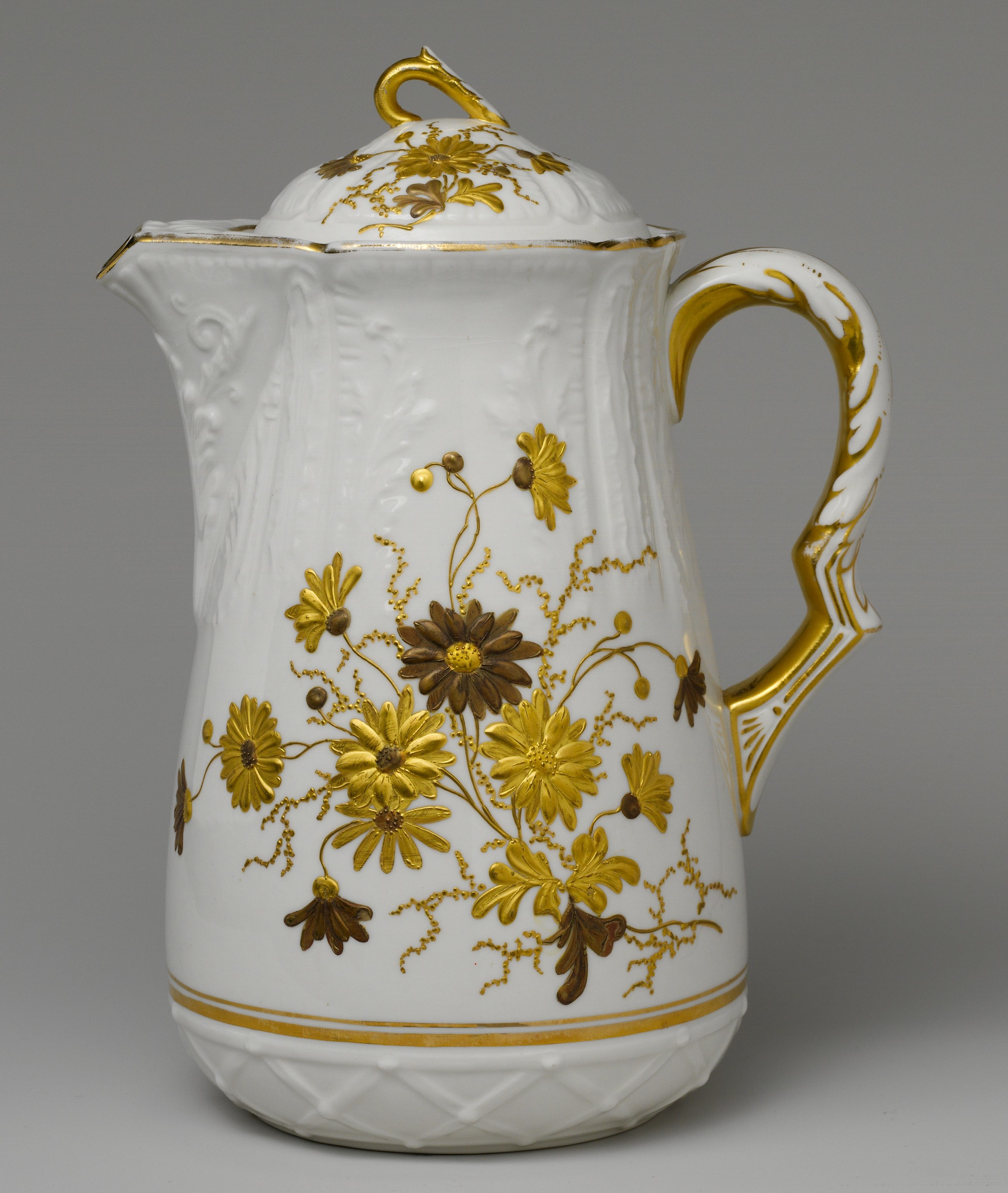
Lotus Ware chocolate pot, produced by Knowles, Taylor, & Knowles c. 1890-1910

The potteries of East Liverpool became the national center of ceramic toilet and table wares, with 85 firms operating at one time or another making two-thirds of the national output from 1880 to 1950. East Liverpool's pottery district encompasses the city itself and the surrounding towns of Chester, Newell, and Wellsville. In 1887, East Liverpool had 21 general ware potteries that employed 2,558 operatives. By 1923, the city's 17 pottery firms had 7,000 employees and operated 270 kilns, with $25 million in annual output (equivalent to $472.41 million in 2025). At various times, some of the largest potteries included the Goodwin Baggott Pottery; Knowles, Taylor & Knowles; Taylor, Smith & Taylor; The Hall China Company; and Homer Laughlin China Company.

Englishman James Bennett established the industry in 1839, making use of good transportation and rich local clays. It quickly became the community's leading industry. East Liverpool became known as "The Crockery City". Potters from Staffordshire, England, began pouring into East Liverpool, attracted by higher wages and the prospect of land ownership. By 1879, there were 24 potteries in East Liverpool, nearly all operated by English immigrants. As late as 1900, East Liverpool remained "essentially a transplanted potting town of Englishmen". Until the turn of the century about 85% percent of the population could trace its heritage to England. After the English, the second largest ethnic group in East Liverpool were German settlers. From 1870 to 1890, the city more than doubled in population each decade as it attracted new industrial workers with the growth of the pottery industry.

In the mid-19th century, East Liverpool produced most of the yellowware pottery used in the United States. Among the most famous of East Liverpool's ceramics was the porcelain known as Lotus Ware. Produced by Knowles, Taylor & Knowles in the 1890s, this Moorish- and Persian-influenced artware swept the competition at the 1893 World's Columbian Exposition in Chicago. The Museum of Ceramics in downtown East Liverpool has the world's largest public display of Lotus Ware.

Two potteries continue to operate in the area: the American Mug & Stein Company and the Fiesta Tableware Company, formerly Homer Laughlin. Holly Black's ceramic-themed novel Doll Bones is set in East Liverpool due to its history in the industry.

=== Other businesses ===
In 1977, a toxic waste incinerator was proposed by Waste Technologies Industries, Inc. (WTI) in the city's East End neighborhood. Local investors believed the incinerator could be an alternative to the declining ceramics industry. However, ambiguity surrounding its potential impacts on public health and the environment led to protests against its construction. In 1991, a march against the incinerator's construction resulted in 33 people, including actor Martin Sheen, being arrested for trespassing. Campaigners pressured Governor George Voinovich through demonstrations at the Governor's Mansion, eventually prompting a limited health study and a moratorium on new incinerator permits, though WTI was exempted.

During the 1992 presidential election, vice presidential candidate Al Gore pledged that the Clinton administration would prevent the incinerator from opening until its compliance with state and federal regulations was confirmed. However, after taking office the Clinton administration failed to act, and the plant began operations in 1993. Greenpeace organized a "Pinocchio" bus tour to the White House to highlight the administration's broken pledge. The campaign ultimately lost momentum after the incinerator's opening, and in 1997 the Ohio Environmental Protection Agency ultimately granted WTI a hazardous waste permit.

In 2005, the United States Environmental Protection Agency declared the area surrounding the WTI incinerator and S.H. Bell Company's nearby metal facility a "potential environmental justice area". In 2008, concerns were raised about toxic particles affecting East Liverpool residents' health, particularly manganese, which was found in high concentrations. East Liverpool residents were found to have higher than normal levels of manganese, cadmium, and lead in their blood, and the community was considered to be in a health crisis due to the presence of these toxic elements. Government agencies worked with S.H. Bell Company to decrease the toxic metals being released into the surrounding air and land, and from 2006 to 2013 air quality improved. In 2014, hazardous and toxic particles in air quality assessments increased. Activism to reduce the toxic waste began.

== Arts and culture ==
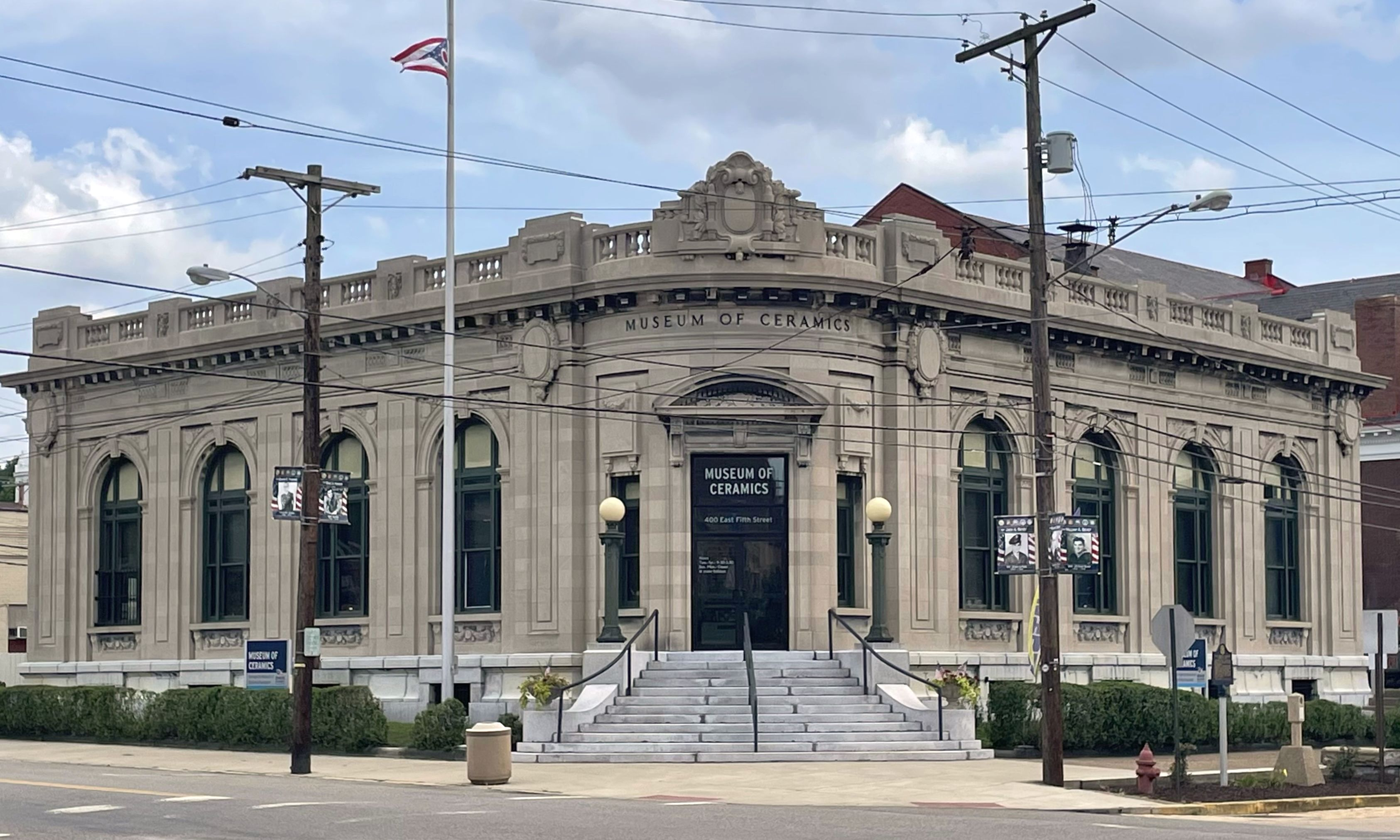
The former East Liverpool Post Office, built in 1909, now houses the Museum of Ceramics.

Since 1970, the annual Tri-State Pottery Festival in June has celebrated the local ceramics industry with local pottery exhibits, games, amusement rides, food vendors, and live entertainment. Starting in 2021, the First Fridays on Fifth event series has taken place on the first Friday of each month from May to October, hosting local crafts, musicians, and food vendors.

=== Library ===
The Carnegie Public Library was funded by industrialist and philanthropist Andrew Carnegie, whose uncle lived in East Liverpool. Along with the Steubenville library, it was the first of the Carnegie libraries in Ohio. Designed by the local A. W. Scott, it was built with Roman mottled buff-brown brick trimmed with white tile, with construction starting in 1900. The lobby is of ceramic mosaic, the wainscoting of Italian marble and the solid brass hardware. The library opened on May 8, 1902, with Gertrude A. Baker of Mount Vernon, Ohio serving as its first librarian. The library underwent two renovations over the 1950s and early 1990s.

=== Historic sites ===
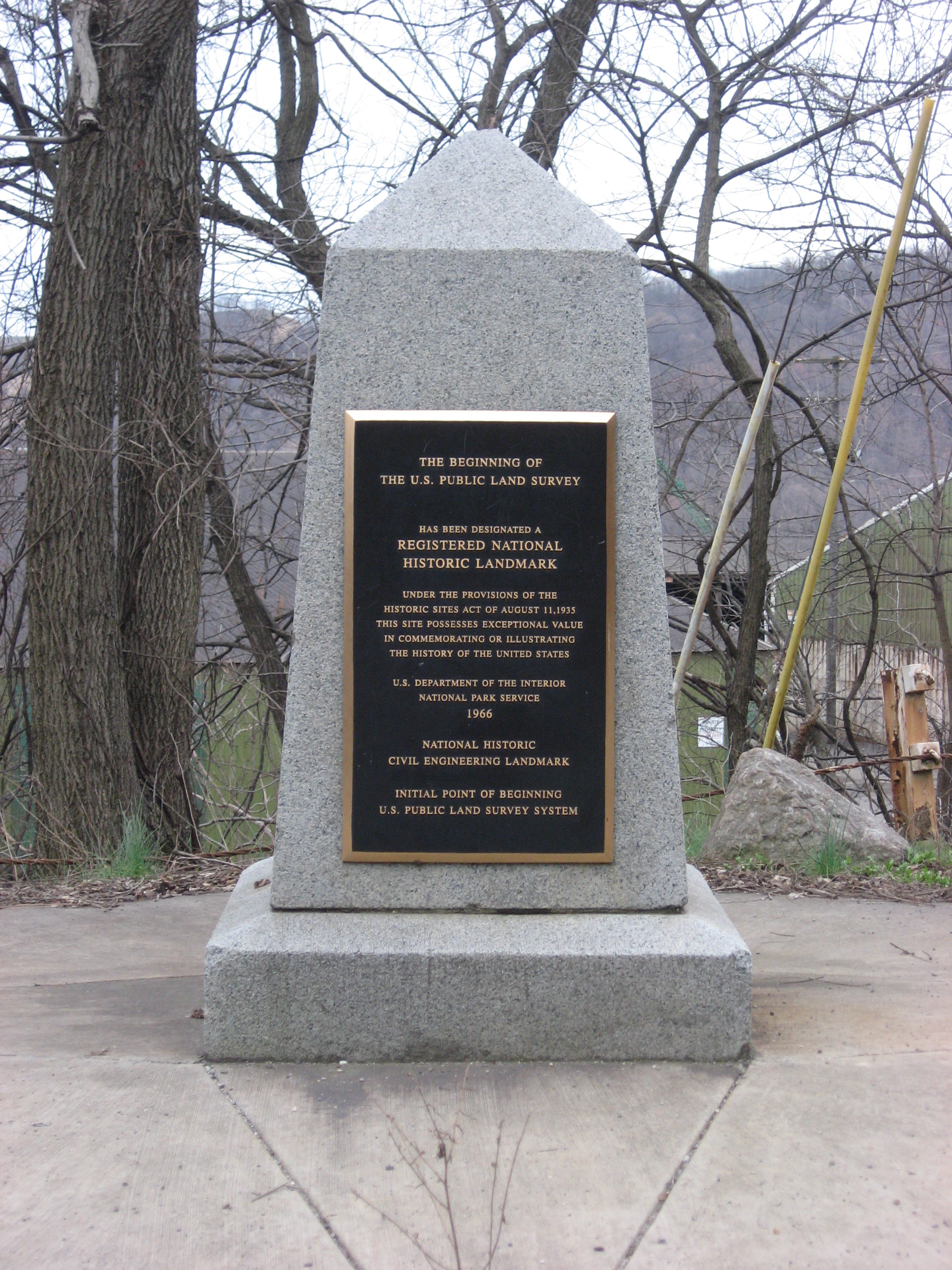
The Beginning Point of the U.S. Public Land Survey monument commemorates the first major cadastral survey undertaken by any nation.

Due to being the home of a large industry with many wealthy business owners, 16 different properties and three historic districts are listed on the National Register of Historic Places, in addition to the Beginning Point of the U.S. Public Land Survey, the only National Historic Landmark in Columbiana County.

The Diamond Historic District is at the one-sided traffic diamond between Market Street and East Sixth Street. The area is triangular, bounded by three roads. Buildings at the Diamond date back to 1884. The East Fifth Street Historic District consists of three blocks of downtown East Liverpool along East Fifth street between Market Street and Broadway, listed due to its examples of Neoclassical architecture. East Liverpool Downtown Historic District covers the whole of downtown in 22 acres, and is noted for its Italianate and Second Empire architecture as well as its prominence as a commercial center in East Liverpool's history.

Many historic properties in East Liverpool were the homesteads of prominent business owners throughout the late 19th century. These include the Cassius Clark Thompson House (1876), Ikirt House (1888), Homer Laughlin House (1882), Godwin-Knowles House (1890), and the Richard L. Cawood Residence (1923), all of unique architectural styles.

The remaining structures on the listing are large, multi-story businesses that had historical significance in East Liverpool's economy and community during the 20th century, such as the original East Liverpool Post Office (1909), Goodwin Baggott Pottery (1844), Carnegie Public Library (1902), the original YMCA (1913), the Civil Works Administration City Hall (1934), the Elks Club building (1916), Odd Fellows Temple (1907), Mary A. Patterson Memorial building (1924), Potters Savings and Loan (1904), the first Potters National Bank (1881), and the Travelers Hotel (1907).

== Sports and recreation ==
There are two public parks within East Liverpool city limits. Thompson Park was established after composer Will Lamartine Thompson donated 100 acres of land to the city in 1899. It opened in 1900 as a green space to get away from the industry of the city. It has been open ever since, and amenities include picnic pavilions, a swimming pool, a football field, a baseball field, a disc golf course, a playground and walking trails. The Broadway Wharf on the Ohio River includes a small public park and boat launch.

The Lewis and Clark National Historic Trail, which commemorates the Lewis and Clark Expedition of 1804 to 1806, passes through East Liverpool.

The semipro East Liverpool Potters basketball team of the Central Basketball League played in the city from 1906 to 1909, and an East Liverpool Potters minor league baseball club was fielded from 1906 to 1912. The East Liverpool Country Club has a 9-hole golf course designed by Willie Park, Jr., that opened on July 14, 1921.

== Government ==
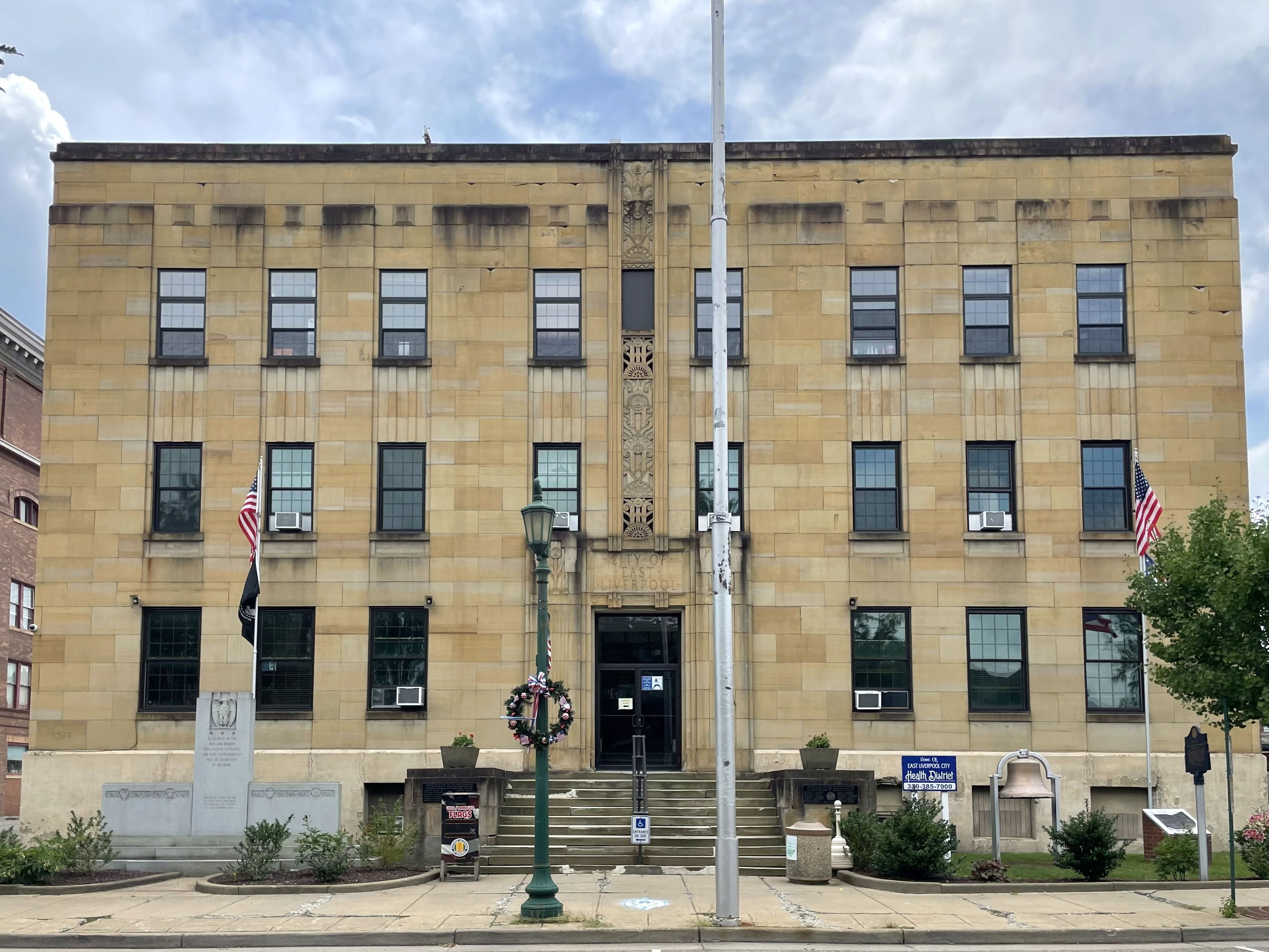
City Hall was built in 1934 as a Civil Works Administration project.

East Liverpool operates under a mayor–council government. Eight council members are elected as a legislature for 2-year terms, comprising four separate wards, three at-large districts, and a council president. In addition, an independently elected mayor serves as an executive. As of 2024, the mayor is Robert J. Smith and the council president is John A. Torma. The mayor, auditor, treasurer, and law director are all elected to 4-year terms.

== Education ==
Children in East Liverpool are served by the public East Liverpool City School District, which includes two elementary schools, one middle school, and East Liverpool Junior/Senior High School. Private schools include East Liverpool Christian School and two online schools, Buckeye Online School for Success and Quaker Digital Academy, which are based downtown. St. Aloysius School was a Catholic school in the Diocese of Youngstown that operated in the city from 1885 to 2015.

Kent State University at East Liverpool, a satellite campus of Kent State University, was established in 1965. In tandem with Kent State Salem, more than 20 post-secondary degrees are offered, including 12 bachelor's degrees. New Castle School of Trades opened a downtown campus in 2016.

== Media ==
East Liverpool was once home to several newspapers in the 1800s, but most were consolidated into The Review, which today serves chiefly southern Columbiana County and northern Hancock County. Additionally, the Morning Journal out of Lisbon reports in the area.

The radio station WOHI 1490 AM has broadcast from the city since December 1, 1949, and is marketed as a classic hits station. The city also had a station on the FM dial 104.3, WOGI, but its license was moved to Moon Township, Pennsylvania, in 2000 and now serves the Pittsburgh radio market. Both stations were launched by the former East Liverpool Broadcasting Company.

== Infrastructure ==
=== Transportation ===
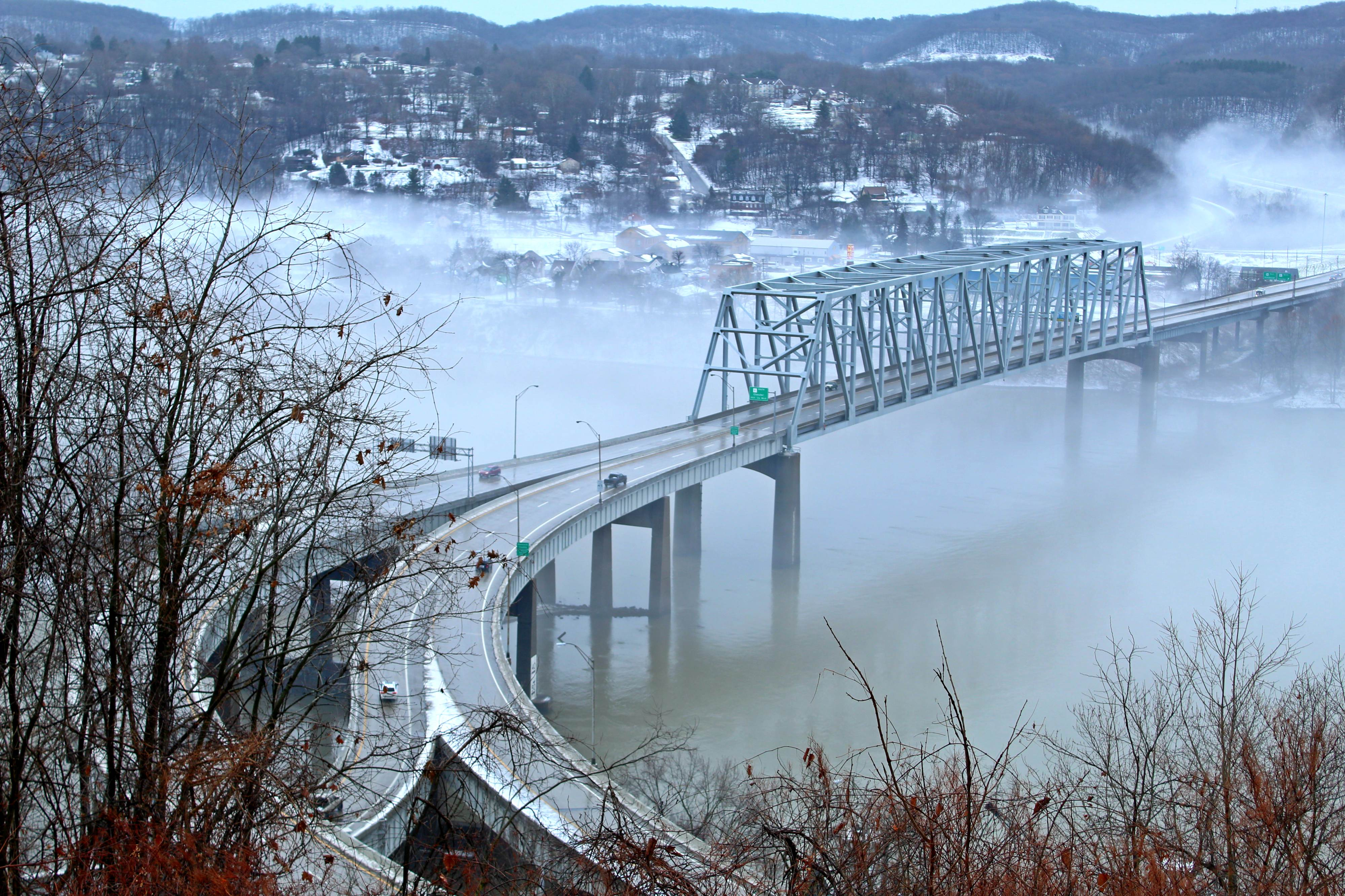
The Jennings Randolph Bridge connects East Liverpool to West Virginia via U.S. Route 30.

U.S. Route 30 passes through East Liverpool before entering West Virginia. Within the city, it is concurrent with State Route 11 and State Route 7, forming a four-lane divided highway with limited access. As the highway reaches downtown, it encounters an interchange where SR 7 exits toward Wellsville, and State Route 39 joins the concurrency. The combined U.S. 30, SR 11, and SR 39 route then curves eastward, running parallel to the Ohio River and Norfolk Southern Railway tracks. At the final interchange, SR 39 continues eastward through the East End neighborhood and the Pennsylvania state line, while U.S. 30 crosses the Ohio River via the Jennings Randolph Bridge into West Virginia. SR 11 terminates at the state line.

State Route 267 begins in downtown East Liverpool, ascending a hill toward the Pleasant Heights neighborhood before continuing into the community of La Croft.

Since the 1890s, East Liverpool and the West Virginia communities of Chester and Newell have been connected by three different bridges spanning the Ohio River. The first Chester Bridge connected College Street in East Liverpool with 1st Street in Chester from 1896 to 1969 and carried U.S. Route 30. The bridge was demolished in 1970. It was replaced by the Jennings Randolph Bridge, which opened in 1977 and carries U.S. 30. The Wayne Six Toll Bridge, formerly Newell Bridge, was built in 1905 and connects West 5th Street near East Liverpool City Hospital with West Virginia State Route 2. It is the only privately owned toll bridge on the Ohio River.

The Columbiana County Airport is located four nautical miles (4.6 mi; 7.4 km) northwest of East Liverpool's central business district.

== Notable people ==
- Dan Adkins, comic book artist for Marvel Comics
- Bernie Allen, former Major League Baseball second baseman
- Dick Booth, former National Football League halfback
- Less Browne, former United States Football League and Canadian Football League defensive back
- Jerrod Calhoun, Cincinnati Bearcats men's basketball head coach
- John Caparulo, stand-up comedian
- Jane Louise Curry, children's novel author
- Ben Feldman, prolific life insurance salesman
- Benedict Charles Franzetta, former Catholic bishop
- John Godwin, former Major League Baseball player
- Lou Holtz, college football coach
- George P. Ikirt, physician and U.S. representative
- John Leslie, pornographic film actor, director, and producer
- Bob McFadden, voice actor
- O. O. McIntyre, columnist of New York Day by Day
- Hy Myers, former Major League Baseball player for the Brooklyn Dodgers
- Seth Neiman, computer industry businessperson, venture capitalist and professional racing driver
- Craig Newbold, member of the Ohio House of Representatives from the 1st district
- Don Reed, member of the Florida House of Representatives
- Sally Johnston Reid, composer, educator and former president of the International Alliance for Women in Music
- Elaine Riley, actress with Paramount Pictures
- Ruth Crawford Seeger, composer and first woman to receive the Guggenheim Fellowship
- George Smith, 13th lieutenant governor of Missouri
- Josh Stansbury, mixed martial artist, former UFC fighter
- Josiah Thompson, author of Six Seconds in Dallas
- Will Lamartine Thompson, composer of hymns and gospel music
- Norm Van Lier, former National Basketball Association point guard
- Jabez Vodrey, prominent early potter
- Peter Wooley, former Hollywood film producer and Emmy Award-nominated art director

== Sister cities ==
East Liverpool has one sister city:

- Stoke-on-Trent, England, United Kingdom
