= Richard L. Cawood Residence =

Historic house in Ohio, United States

- Cawood, Richard L., Residence
- U.S. National Register of Historic Places
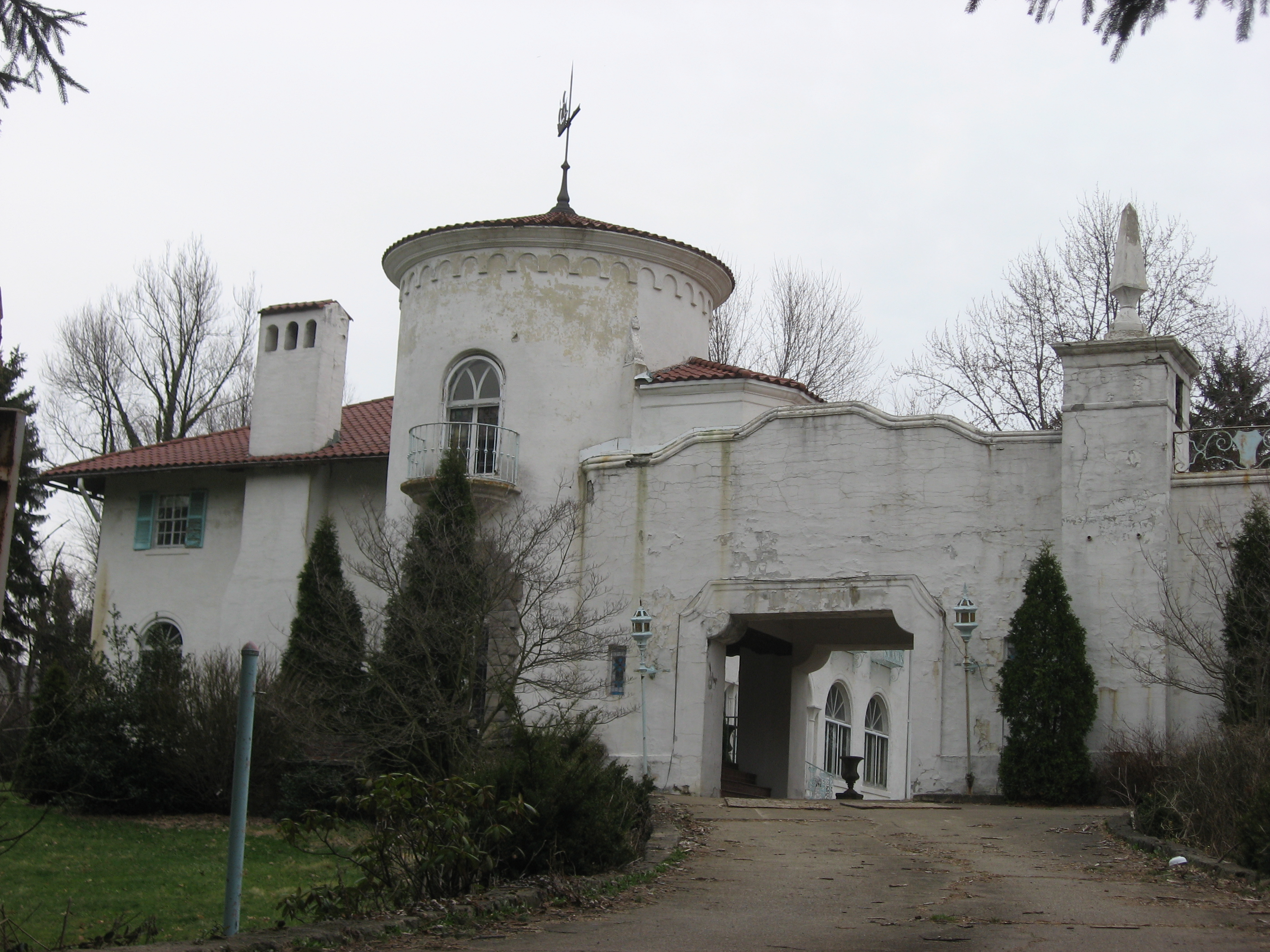

- Location within Ohio Location within the United States
- Location: 2600 St. Clair Ave., East Liverpool, Ohio
- Coordinates: 40°38′38″N 80°34′23″W
- Area: 6 acres (2.4 ha)
- Built: 1923
- Architect: Peterson & Clark, J.W. Livingston
- Architectural style: Late 19th And 20th Century Revivals, Mission Revival/Spanish Revival, Italian Renaissance
- NRHP reference No.: 87002502
- Added to NRHP: January 21, 1988

The Richard L. Cawood Residence was built in 1923 by Richard Cawood in East Liverpool, Ohio. Cawood was the president of Patterson foundry and owned a steel mill. He had an intense interest in architecture and design and often designed smaller houses.

The design of the house evolved over ten years. Cawood included a tower, chapel, and Porte-cochère. The house is an example of Italian Renaissance architecture combined with Spanish eclectic additions.

The house was added to the National Register of Historic Places in January 1988.
