= Diamond Historic District (East Liverpool, Ohio) =

Historic district in Ohio, United States

- U.S. National Register of Historic Places
- U.S. Historic district
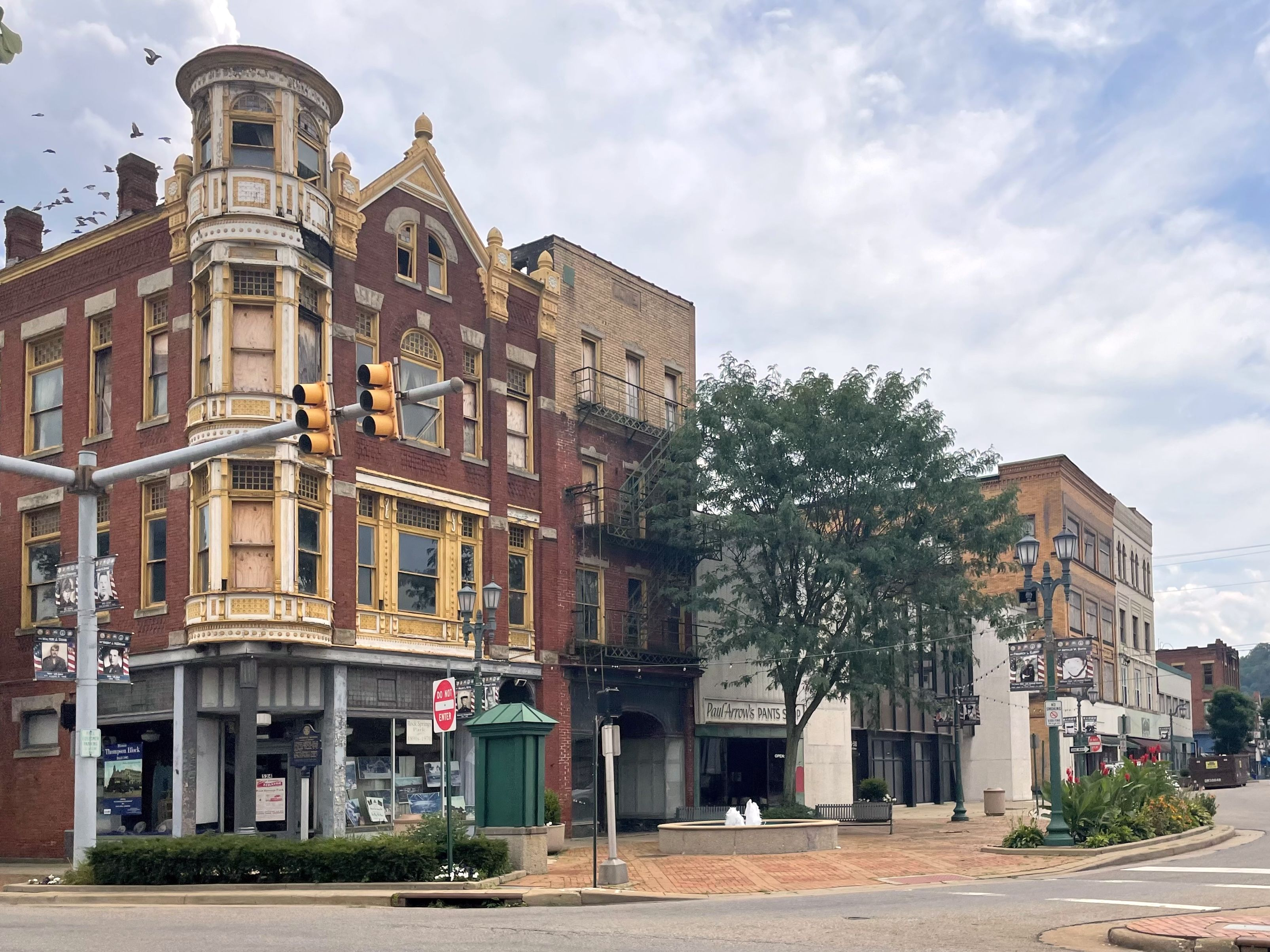
- Intersection of Market and Sixth Streets in downtown East Liverpool, Ohio

- Location within Ohio Location within the United States
- Location: Market and E. Sixth Sts., East Liverpool, Ohio
- Coordinates: 40°37′07″N 80°34′33″W
- Area: 2 acres (0.81 ha)
- Architectural style: Mixed (more Than 2 Styles From Different Periods), Queen Anne
- MPS: East Liverpool Central Business District MRA
- NRHP reference No.: 85003508
- Added to NRHP: November 14, 1985

The Diamond Historic District is a 2 acres (0.81 ha) area in downtown East Liverpool, Ohio. It is located at Market and East Sixth Streets. The area is triangular and is bounded by three roads. The district was added to the National Register of Historic Places in November 1985.

"The Diamond" (pictured), erected by George Gaston in 1884, was the first four-story brick building in East Liverpool and is located in this district. Restoration of the J.C. Thompson Building at the heart of the district began in 2024 as part of a $1.2 million incentive received from the state government.
