= Barron =

Barron may refer to:

== Places ==
=== Australia ===
- Barron, Queensland, a suburb of Cairns
- Barron River (Queensland)
- Barron Falls, Queensland, a waterfall
- Barron Gorge, Queensland

=== United States ===
- Barron County, Wisconsin
- Barron, Wisconsin, a city
- Barron (town), Wisconsin, a town
- Barron, Washington, a ghost town
- Barron River, Everglades City, Florida
- Barron Creek, Santa Clara County, California
- Barron Field, an airfield in Everman, Texas

=== Elsewhere ===
- Barron Lake, Labrador, Canada
- Barron River (Ontario), Canada
- Barrón, Spain, a village

== People ==
- Barron (surname), a list of people
- Barron (given name), a list of people
- Barron Clan, a sept of the Scots Clan Rose

== Other uses ==
- Barron v. Baltimore, an 1833 United States Supreme Court case regarding states' rights
- Barron baronets, an extinct title in the Baronetage of the United Kingdom
- Barron (horse), an Olympic show jumping horse
- Barron Stadium, Rome, Georgia, United States, a football and track and field stadium

== See also ==
- Barron House (disambiguation)
- Barron Building, an office tower in Calgary, Alberta, Canada
- Barron Library, a historic building in Woodbridge Township, New Jersey, United States
- Barron Plan, an Anglo-Portuguese plan for military infrastructure developed after World War II
- Barron's (disambiguation)
- Richard Barrons (born 1959), retired British general
- Baron (disambiguation)
- Baranov (disambiguation)
