= Baron (disambiguation) =

Baron is a title of nobility.

Baron or The Baron may also refer to:

== Places ==
- Baron, Gard, France
- Baron, Gironde, France
- Baron, Oise, France
- Baron, Saône-et-Loire, France
- Baron-sur-Odon, France
- Baron, Allahabad, India

== People ==
- Baron (name), people with the surname or given name Baron
- Baron (photographer), Sterling Henry Nahum (1906–1956)

== Entertainment ==
- BARON.E, Swiss indie-pop music duo
- The Baron (novella), a 1942 Portuguese novella by Branquinho da Fonseca
- The Baron (TV series), a mid-1960s British television series
- The Baron (album), a 1981 album by American country singer Johnny Cash
  - "The Baron" (song), a 1981 song by Johnny Cash
- The Baron (film), a 2011 Portuguese film based on the novella
- "The Baron" (Inside Victor Lewis-Smith), a 1993 television episode
- Baron, a fictional kingdom in the game Final Fantasy IV
- Baron Humbert von Gikkingen, a character in The Cat Returns
- Baron Greenback, from Danger Mouse
- Baron Afanas, a character in What We Do in the Shadows (TV series)

== Other uses ==
- Euthalia, a genus of butterflies known as barons
  - Euthalia aconthea, a species of butterflies known as common barons
- BARON, a mathematical software package
- Beechcraft Baron, an aircraft
- Baron Hotel, Aleppo, Syria
- Baron Services, a weather technology company
- Baron convention, in the game of contract bridge
- The Baron (horse), an Irish thoroughbred racehorse of the mid-19th century
- Baron, a cut of beef comprising a double sirloin joined at the backbone
- Baron Kriminel, a spirit in the Guédé family in Haitian Vodou
- Battlin' Baron, the mascot of Bethesda-Chevy Chase High School
- Barons Bus, an intercity bus company operating in the United States

== See also ==
- Feudal baron, a vassal holding a barony in fealty to an overlord
- Baron of the Exchequer, a type of English judge
- Cattle baron, the owner of many cattle
- BARON.E, a Swiss pop music duo
- Barony (disambiguation)
- Le Baron (disambiguation) (also spelled le Baron and LeBaron)
- Barron (disambiguation)
- Barons (disambiguation)
