= Barron House =

Barron House may refer to:

- Martin Van Buren Barron House, listed on the National Register of Historic Places in Eau Claire County, Wisconsin
- Thomas Barron House, listed on the National Register of Historic Places in Ontario County, New York
- Bray-Barron House, listed on the National Register of Historic Places in Barbour County, Alabama
- Webb-Barron-Wells House, listed on the National Register of Historic Places in Wilson County, North Carolina
