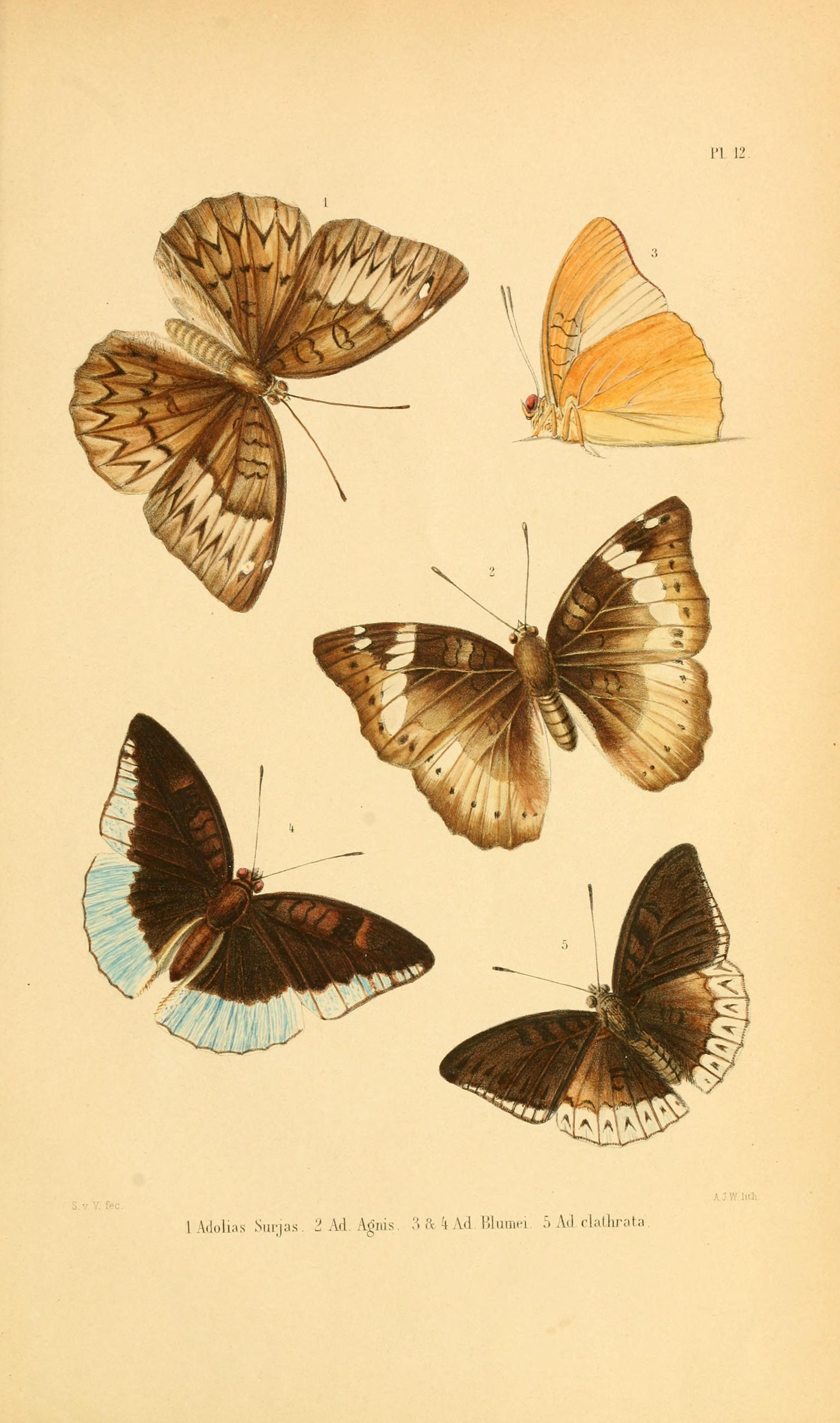
- Euthalia agnis (fig 2) plate accompanying original description

Scientific classification
- Kingdom: Animalia
- Phylum: Arthropoda
- Class: Insecta
- Order: Lepidoptera
- Family: Nymphalidae
- Genus: Euthalia
- Species: E. agnis

Binomial name
- Euthalia agnis (Vollenhoven, 1862)

= Euthalia agnis =

Species of butterfly

Euthalia agnis is a butterfly of the family Nymphalidae (Limenitidinae). It is found in the Indomalayan realm.

== Description ==
The sexes differ to an unusual degree. The males are more abundant than the females.The males resembles above E. tinna Fruhst. (130 a), coffee-brown with purplish lustre; beneath easily separated from all the other members of the genus by the peculiar grey-white lustre, suffused with violet, resembling that of the South American Prepona, margined by delicate brown stripes and traversed by faint, nearly obsolete bands of a similar colour. Female somewhat like E. vasanta Moore female but the under surface is brown-grey, without any milky-white or pearly lustre. The genitals are distinguished from those of the other species by the perfectly flat cylindrical valve being cut off straight anteriorly. Uncus somewhat more robust and longer than in E. salia. The imago is only found in the mountains, never below an altitude of 3800 ft.

== Subspecies ==
- E. a. agnis Java
- E. a. modesta Fruhstorfer, 1906 Sumatra
- E. a. hiyamai Yokochi & Matsuda, 1999 Malaya
