= Barron's (disambiguation) =

Barron's is a financial newspaper.

Barron's may also refer to:

- Barron's Educational Series, a brand name of Kaplan, Inc.
  - B.E.S. Publishing, an American publishing company, founded as Barron's Educational Services
- Barron's 400 Index, a stock market index
- Barron's kukri snake, Oligodon barroni
- Barron's buckwheat, Eriogonum spectabile

== See also ==
- Barron (disambiguation)
- Barons (disambiguation)
- Richard Barrons (born 1959), retired British general
