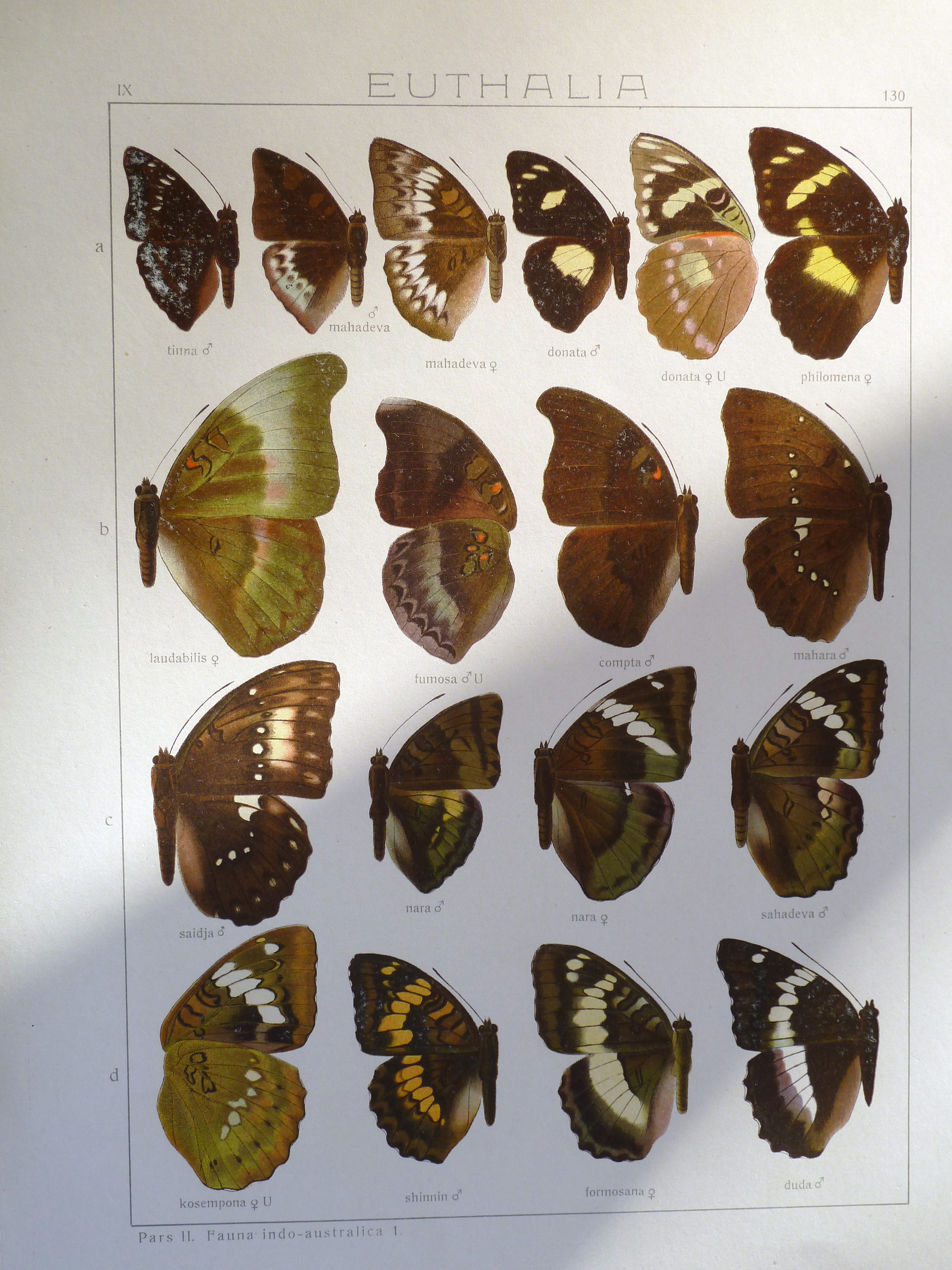
- Euthalia tinna in Seitz

Scientific classification
- Kingdom: Animalia
- Phylum: Arthropoda
- Class: Insecta
- Order: Lepidoptera
- Family: Nymphalidae
- Genus: Euthalia
- Species: E. tinna

Binomial name
- Euthalia tinna Fruhstorfer, 1906

= Euthalia tinna =

Species of butterfly

Euthalia tinna is a butterfly of the family Nymphalidae (Limenitidinae). It is found in the Indomalayan realm. It resembles Euthalia agnis, but underneath it widely differs from it in the absence of the silver-grey Prepona-like lustre distinguishing that species. Above it deviates from agnis by having the subapical white spots on the costa of the forewing smaller, but the ultracellular spots making up the median macular row longer, streak-like. The ground-colour is darker, almost black. The whitish light on the costal margin of the hindwing is absent, and the median stripe is placed nearer the black submarginal band. Underneath tinna approaches jama Fldr. and garuda Moore, especially garuda sandakana Moore, but is rather paler, having the white median macular row shorter and the black submarginal longitudinal band more distinct.

== Subspecies ==
- E. t. tinna Borneo
- E. t. agniformis Fruhstorfer, 1906 Sumatra
- E. t. paupera Fruhstorfer, 1906 Malaya, Thailand
