= Baroness (disambiguation) =

Baroness is a noble title and the female equivalent of Baron.

Baroness or The Baroness may also refer to:

== People ==
- The Baroness, the pen name of Elsa von Freytag-Loringhoven
- Raymonde "the Baroness" de Laroche (1882–1919), stunt pilot

== Literature ==
- The Baroness: A Novel, an 1837 novel by George W. M. Reynolds
- The Baroness: A Dutch Story, an 1892 novel by Frances Mary Peard
- The Baroness (novels), a 1970s series of spy novels by Paul Kenyon
- The Baroness: The Search for Nica the Rebellious Rothschild, a 2012 non-fiction book by Hannah Rothschild

== Television ==
- "The Baroness", The Adventures of William Tell episode 8 (1958)
- "The Baroness", Younger season 7, episode 8 (2021)

== Other uses ==
- Baroness (band), a metal band from Savannah, Georgia
- Baroness (G.I. Joe), a fictional villain in the G.I. Joe universe
- Baroness (solitaire), a card game for one player
- The Baroness (album), a 2008 music recording by Sarah Slean

== See also ==
- Baron (disambiguation)
