= Baronett =

Baronett may refer to:

- Baronet (variant spelling: baronett), an hereditary title of lower rank than baron
- Baronette (variant spelling: baronett), a type of satin
- Baronett Peak (44°58′31″N 110°05′19″W), Yellowstone Park, USA; surveyed as part of the Hayden Geological Survey of 1871
- Baronett Bridge (44°55′45″N 110°24′03″W), the first bridge across the Yellowstone River, Yellowstone Park, USA; destroyed during the incident of Nez Perce in Yellowstone Park

== See also ==
- Baron (disambiguation)
