= Significant Alberta Architecture =

The Alberta Association of Architects published their Chronicle of Significant Alberta Architecture in February 2003 (Phase One) and August 2005 (Phase 2). The project's main goal was to ensure that the public, as well as those with a professional interest in the subject, could easily identify architecturally significant structures developed and still standing in Alberta. The project was undertaken in association with the Government of Alberta (Phase 1 associated with the ministry of Employment, Immigration and Industry and Phase 2 associated with ministry of Economic Development).

== Significant structures by location ==
=== Calgary ===
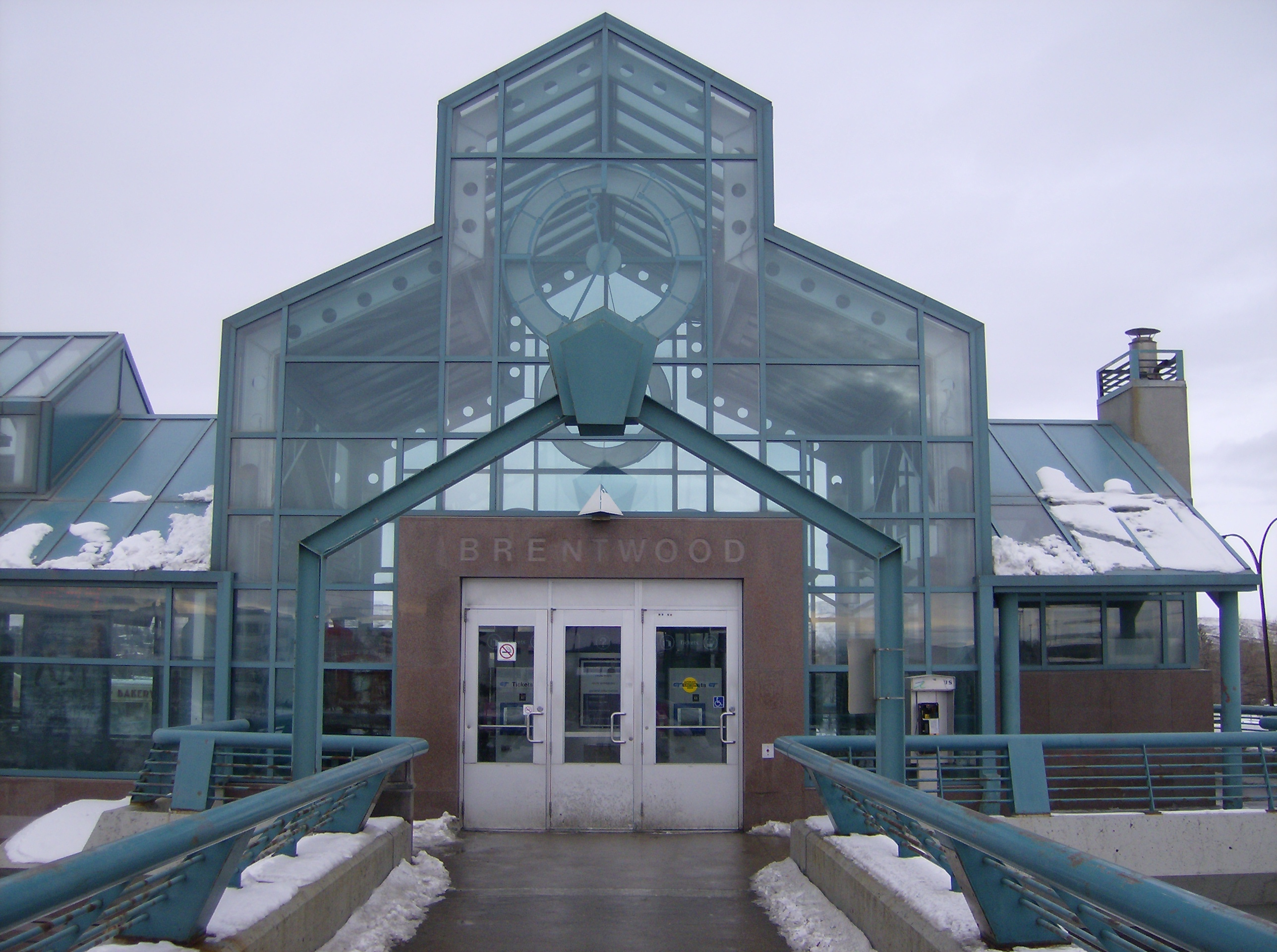
Brentwood (C-Train) LRT station in Calgary

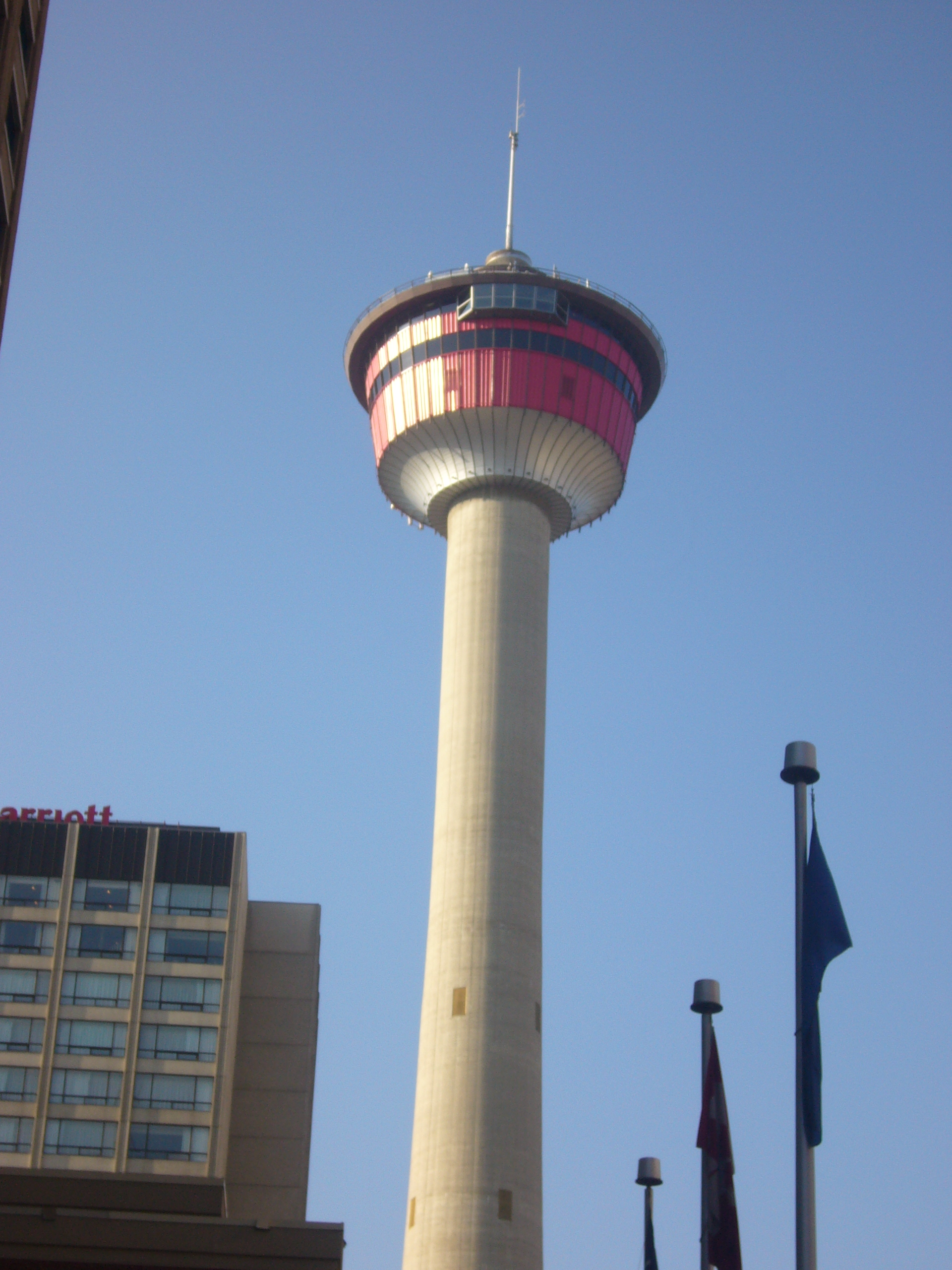
Calgary Tower (Husky Tower)

- Animal Services Centre
- Bankers Hall
- Barron Building
- Bearspaw House
- Brentwood LRT Station
- Calgary Board of Education, Education Centre
- Calgary Centennial Planetarium
- Calgary Drop-in & Rehab Centre
- Calgary International Airport
- Canada Olympic Park (Paskapoo)
- Calgary Real Estate Board
- Calgary Tower (Husky Tower)
- Centre of Hope, Salvation Army
- Christchurch
- Coach House/Maisonneuve
- Connaught Gardens
- Destination Africa, Calgary Zoo
- Franklin House
- Glenmore Water Treatment Complex
- Grain Exchange
- Hudson's Bay Store #4
- ICT Building, University of Calgary
- Lindsay Park Aquatic Centre (now MNP Community & Sport Centre)
- Lougheed Building & Grand Theatre
- McDougall Centre
- Millennium Landmark
- Native Addictions Centre
- NewZones Gallery of Contemporary Art
- Nortel Wireless Communications Plant
- NOVA Corp
- Olympic Saddledome
- Olympic Speed Skating Oval, University of Calgary
- Renfrew Education Services, Main School
- Rockyview General Hospital
- Rosedale House
- Rozsa Centre, University of Calgary
- St. Andrew's United Church
- St. Mary's Roman Catholic Cathedral
- St. Stephen's Byzantine Ukrainian Catholic Church
- Shaw Court
- Shouldice Change Pavilion
- Southern Alberta Institute of Technology 2001 Project
- Sydenham House
- Transalta Corporate Headquarters
- Urban House III

=== Edmonton ===
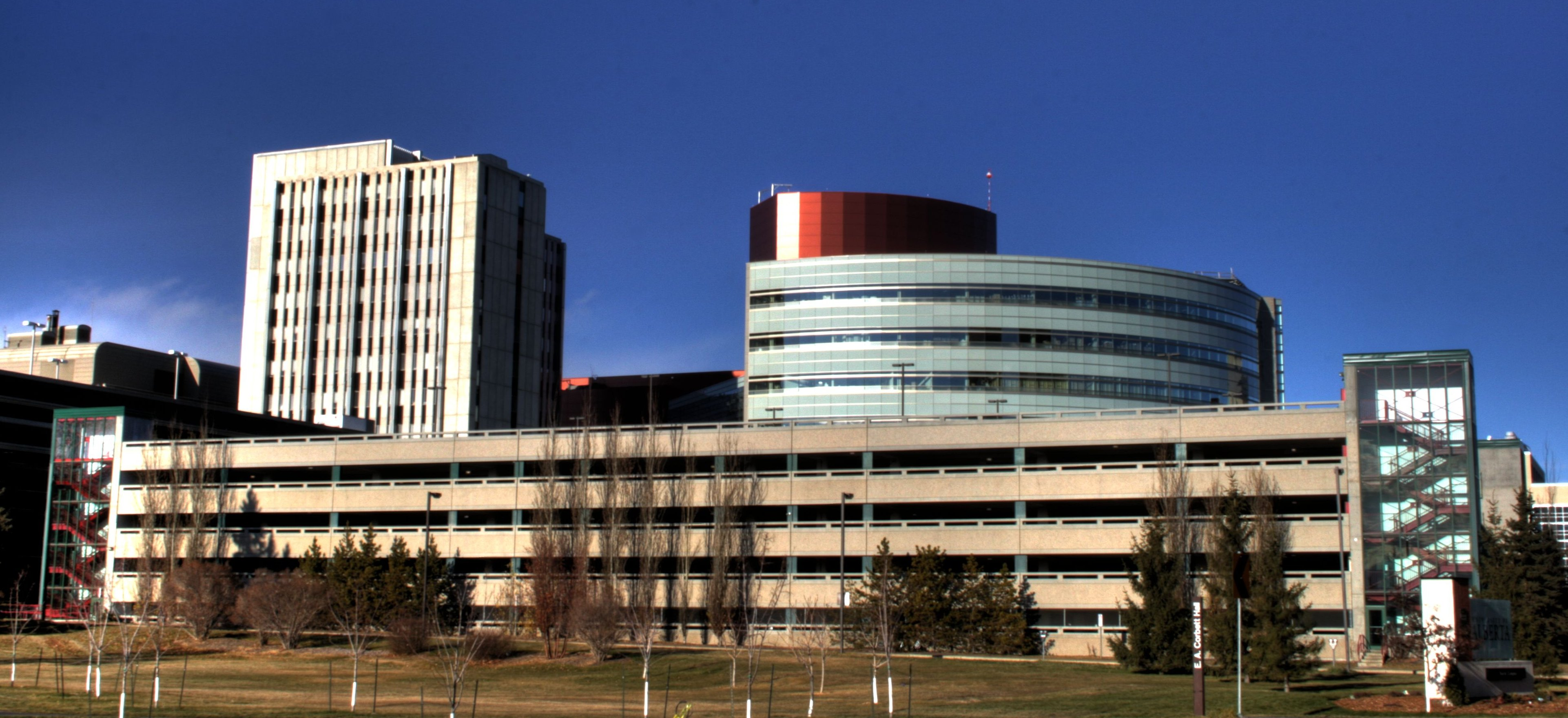
The University Hospital Complex, which includes the Alberta Heart Institute

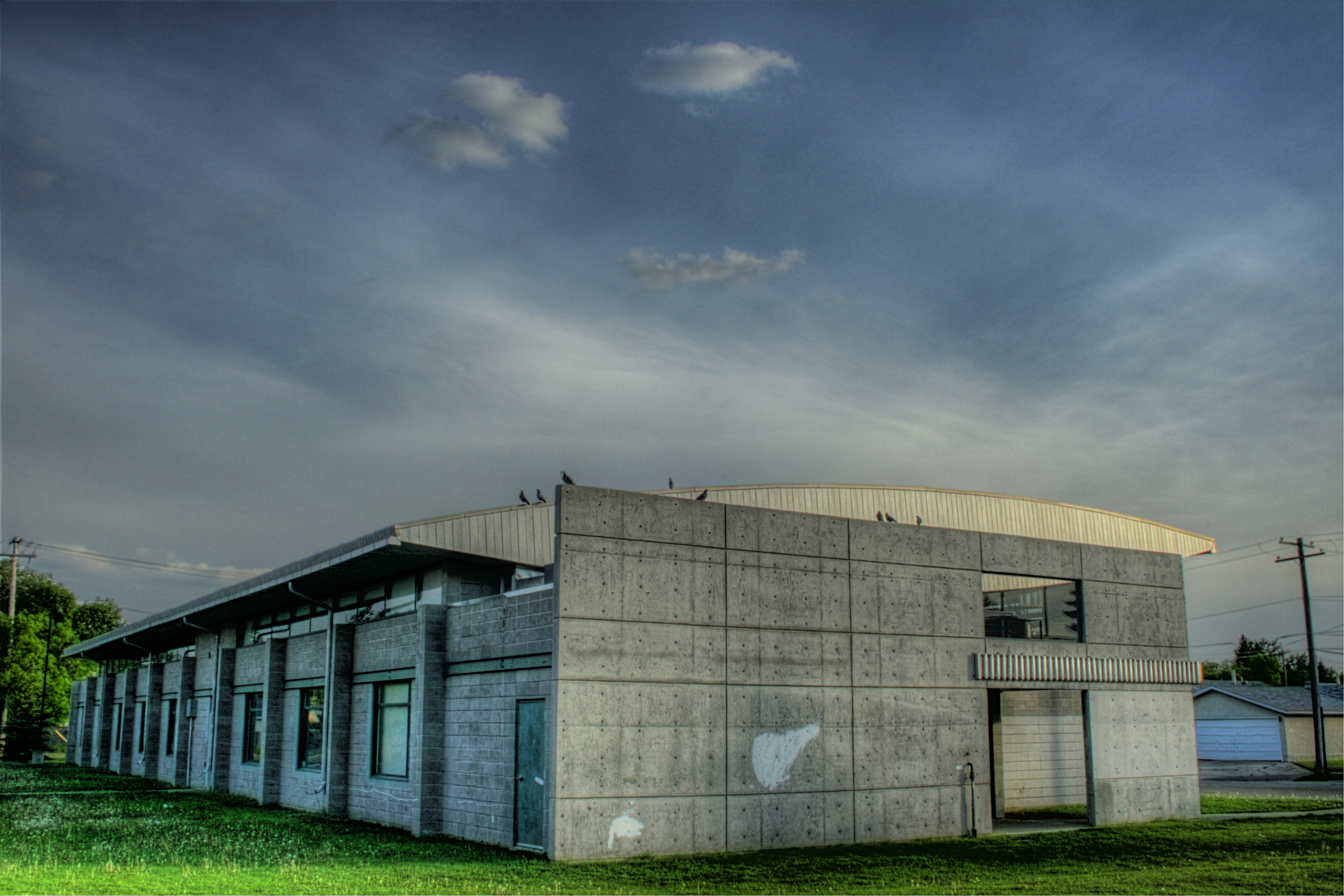
The Boys and Girls Club building

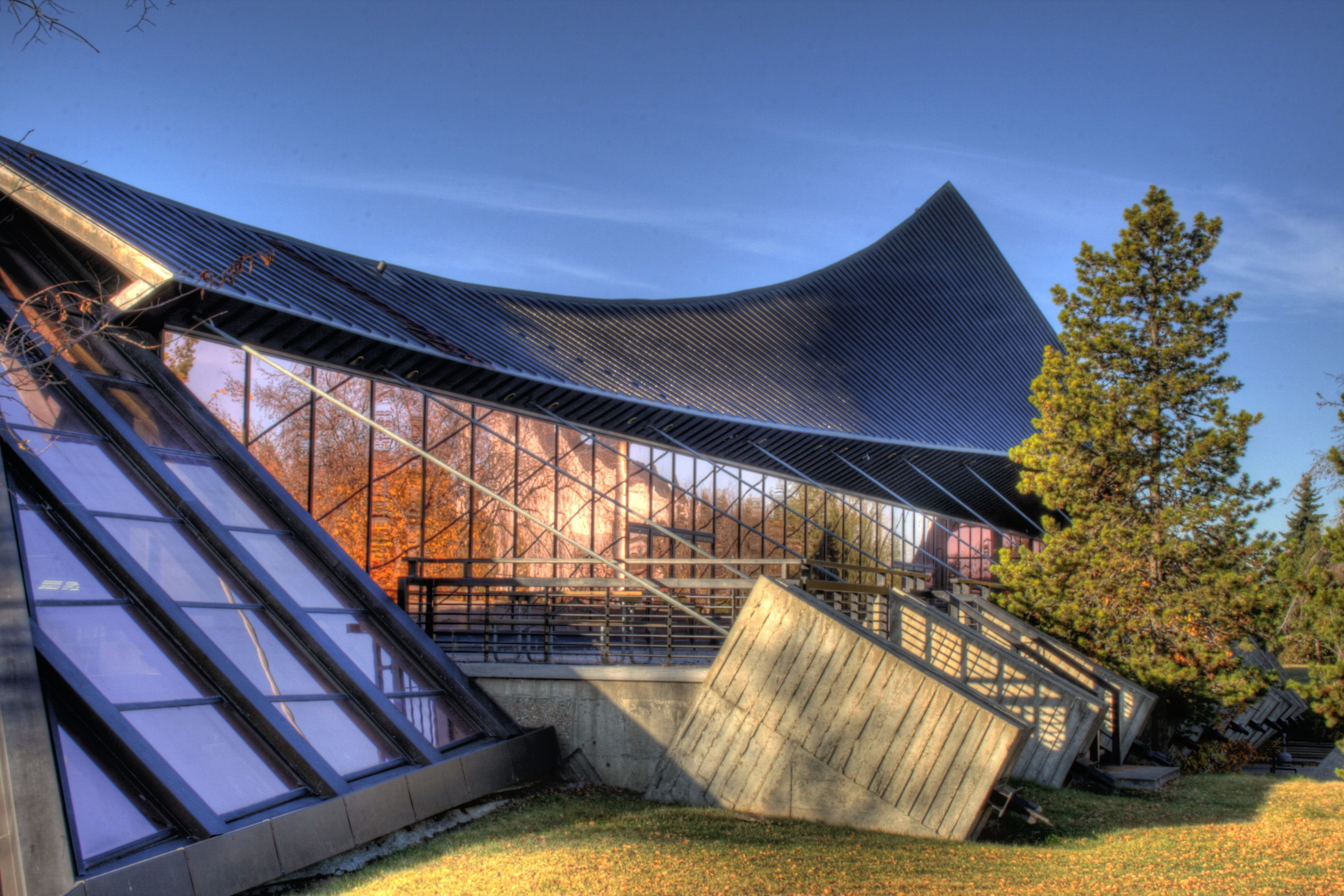
The Peter Hemingway Fitness and Leisure Centre (formerly named the Coronation Pool) in Coronation Park

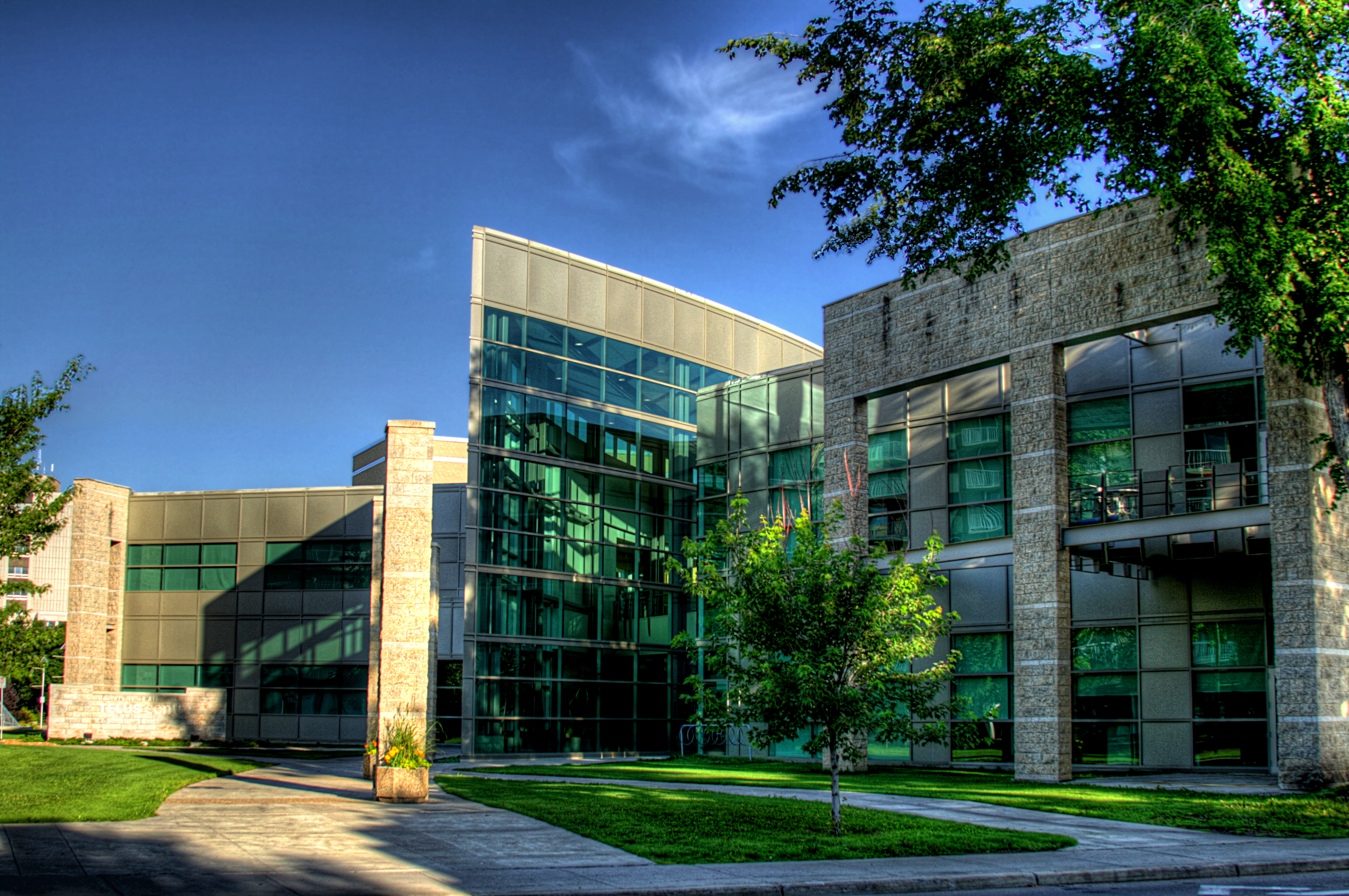
The Telus Professional Development Centre at the University Of Alberta

- Advanced Technology Centre, 9650 20 Avenue NW
- Alberta Heart Institute
- Alberta Legislative Assembly
- Boys & Girls Club, West Edmonton Centre, 16030 104 Avenue NW
- Canada Post Bulk Mail Facility (Edmonton Mail Processing Plant), 12135 149 Street
- Citadel Theatre, 99 Street and 102A Avenue NW
- City of Edmonton Police Headquarters, 9620 103A Ave NW
- Coronation Swimming Pool (renamed Peter Hemingway Fitness and Leisure Centre), 13808 111 Avenue NW
- Edmonton City Hall, 1 Sir Winston Churchill Square NW
- Hotel Macdonald, 10065 100 Street NW
- Garneau Student Housing, 88 Avenue and 110 Street NW
- MacEwan University city centre campus, northwest of 104 Avenue and 105 Street NW
- Housing Union Building (HUB) student residence, 9005 112 Street, University of Alberta
- Intuit CBIP Designated Green Building, 7008 Roper Road
- Muttart Conservatory, 9626 96A Street NW
- Nilex Inc., 9304 39 Avenue NW
- Rutherford House, 11153 Saskatchewan Drive NW
- Stanley Engineering Building, Kingsway Avenue NW
- Telus Centre for Professional Development, University of Alberta, 87 Avenue and 111 Street NW
- Telus Plaza Redevelopment Project, 10025 Jasper Avenue NW
- Walter C. MacKenzie Health Sciences Centre, 8440 112 Street NW
- West Jasper Place Transit Centre, 87 Avenue west of 170 Street NW
- Winspear Centre, 9720 102 Avenue NW

=== Banff ===
- Banff Park Museum
- Banff Springs Hotel redevelopment
- Banff Town Hall
- Cave & Basin
- Composer's Studio E
- Fairmont Banff Springs Hotel Golf Club House
- Sally Borden Building

=== Northern Alberta ===
- Driftpile K4-Grade 12 School, Driftpile
- Grand Prairie Regional College, Grand Prairie
- Saddle Lake Jr/Sr High School, Saddle Lake

=== Central Alberta ===
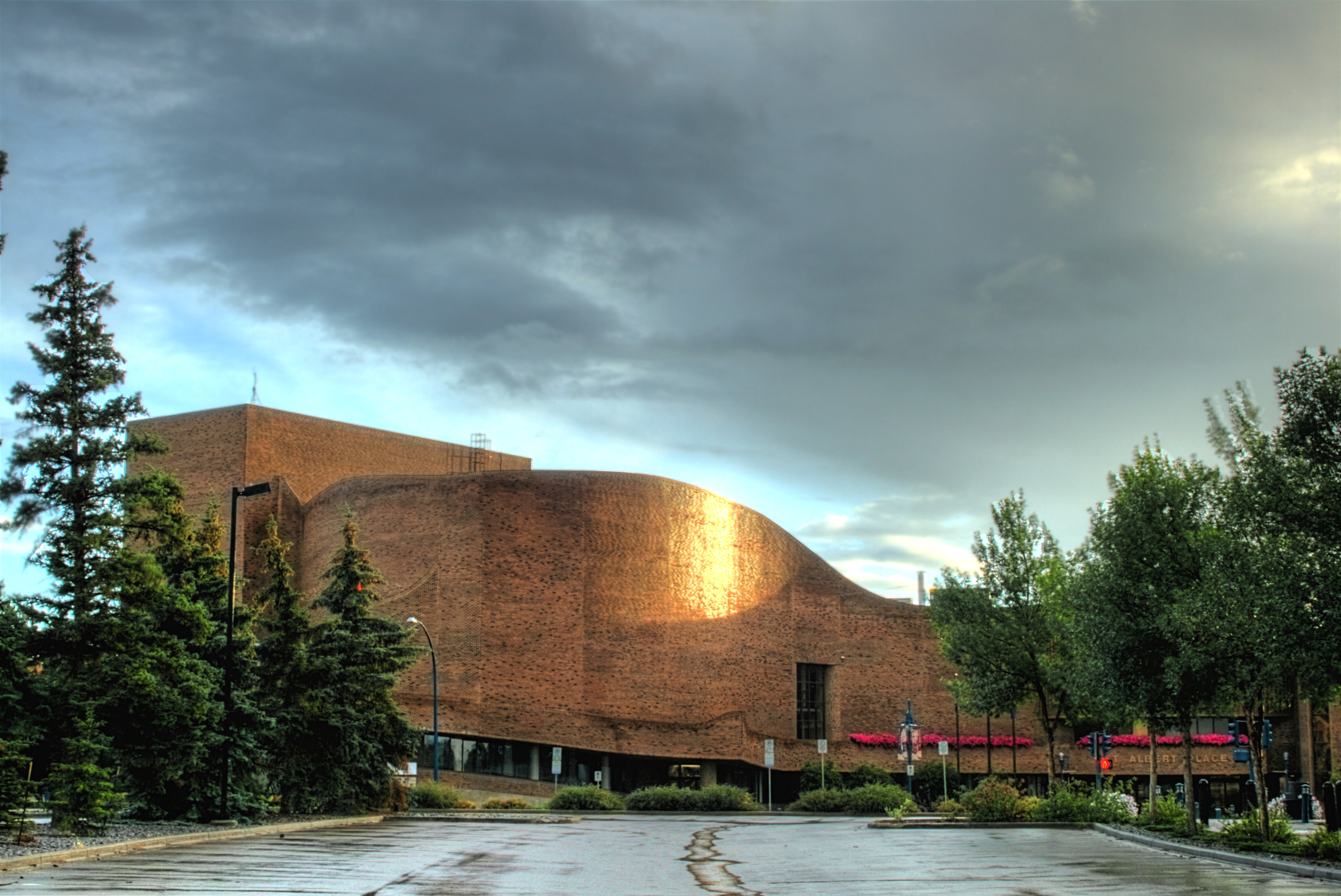
St. Albert Place

- Collicut Leisure Centre, Red Deer
- Ermineskin Junior/Senior High School, Maskwacis
- Hobbema Healing Lodge (Pe Sakastew), Maskwacis
- Ponoka Town Hall, Ponoka
- St. Albert Place, 5 St. Anne Street, St. Albert
- St. Mary's Roman Catholic Church, Red Deer

=== Southern Alberta ===
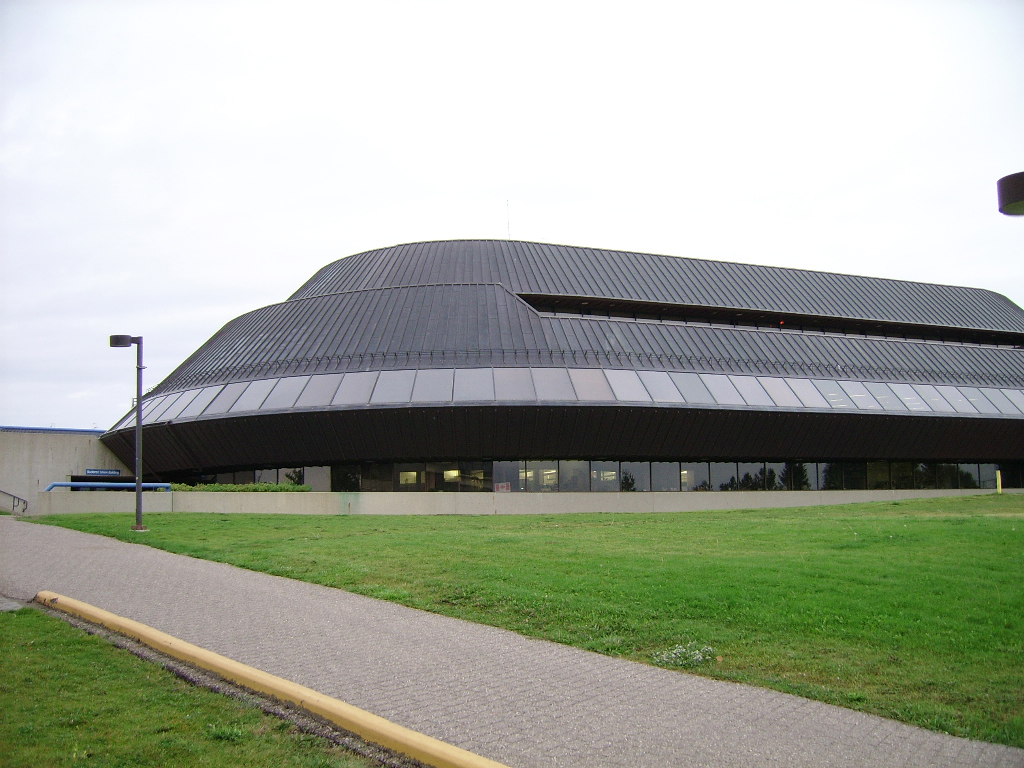
University of Lethbridge

- Alberta Temple, Church of Christ, Latter Day Saints, Cardston
- Black House, Lethbridge
- Fooks House, Lethbridge
- Haig House, Lethbridge
- Head-Smashed-In Buffalo Jump Interpretive Centre, Fort Macleod
- House for Whale Watchers, Canmore
- Lethbridge City Hall, Lethbridge
- Medicine Hat City Hall, Medicine Hat
- Post Hotel, Lake Louise
- Prince of Wales Hotel, Waterton Lake
- Royal Tyrrell Museum of Palaeontology, Drumheller
- SMED Falkridge Corporate Retreat, Priddis
- University of Lethbridge, Lethbridge
- University of Lethbridge Library Information Network Centre (LINC), Lethbridge

== See also ==
- List of attractions and landmarks in Calgary
- List of attractions and landmarks in Edmonton
- Heritage buildings in Edmonton
- Canadian architecture
