= Elm City, North Carolina =

- Town
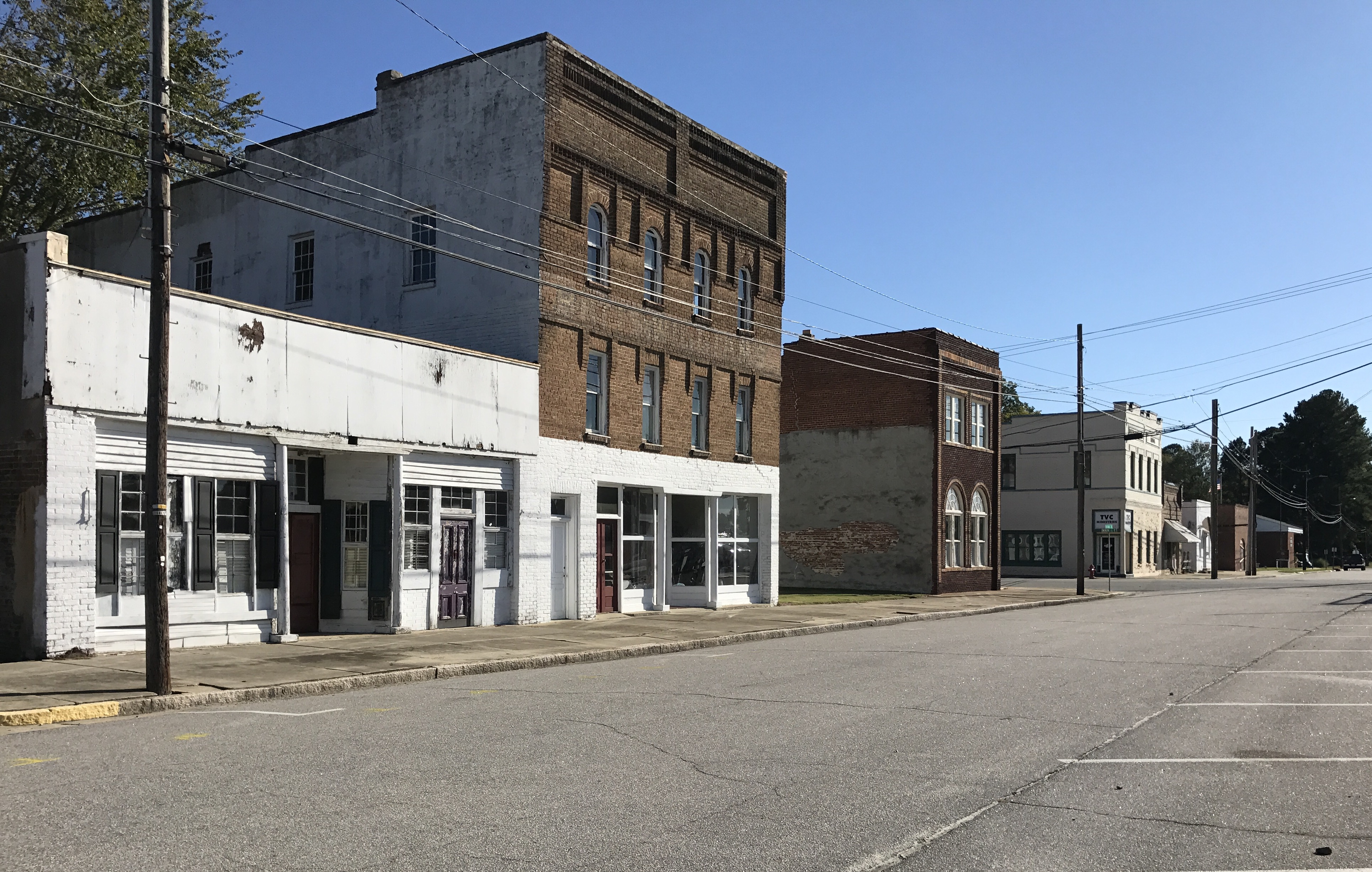
- Motto: "Southern Living"
- Location within the state of North Carolina
- Coordinates: 35°48′15″N 77°51′22″W
- Country: United States
- State: North Carolina
- County: Wilson, Nash

Area
  - Total: 2.16 sq mi (5.59 km^{2})
  - Land: 2.15 sq mi (5.57 km^{2})
  - Water: 0.0077 sq mi (0.02 km^{2})
- Elevation: 135 ft (41 m)

Population (2020)
  - Total: 1,218
  - Density: 566.4/sq mi (218.68/km^{2})
- Time zone: UTC-5 (Eastern (EST))
  - Summer (DST): UTC-4 (EDT)
- ZIP code: 27822
- Area code: 252
- FIPS code: 37-20980
- GNIS feature ID: 2406443
- Website: elmcitync.com/

Elm City is a town in Nash and Wilson County, United States. As of the 2020 census, Elm City had a population of 1,218. It is a suburb of Wilson, North Carolina.

== History ==
The Elm City Municipal Historic District, W. H. Langley House, and Webb-Barron-Wells House were listed on the National Register of Historic Places in 1986.

In the summer of 1964, the Ku Klux Klan drove away a group of black and white teenage volunteers repainting the local First Presbyterian Church. Subsequently, adult volunteers returned to finish the job, and Governor Terry Sanford dispatched state troopers to protect the team of integrated volunteers. An attempt was later made by two white youths from Rocky Mount to burn down the church but they failed. Today elm city prides itself on integrating all races and walks of life

== Geography ==
According to the United States Census Bureau, the town has a total area of 0.8 square miles (2.1 km^{2}), all land.

== Demographics ==
Historical population
Census	Pop.	Note	%±
1880	313		—
1890	482		54.0%
1900	560		16.2%
1910	590		5.4%
1920	725		22.9%
1930	905		24.8%
1940	946		4.5%
1950	839		−11.3%
1960	729		−13.1%
1970	1,201		64.7%
1980	1,561		30.0%
1990	1,624		4.0%
2000	1,165		−28.3%
2010	1,298		11.4%
2020	1,218		−6.2%
U.S. Decennial Census

=== 2020 census ===
Elm City racial composition
Race	Number	Percentage
White (non-Hispanic)	400	32.84%
Black or African American (non-Hispanic)	649	53.28%
Native American	10	0.82%
Asian	27	2.22%
Other/Mixed	38	3.12%
Hispanic or Latino	94	7.72%

As of the 2020 United States census, there were 1,218 people, 547 households, and 368 families residing in the town.

=== 2000 census ===
As of the census of 2000, there were 1,165 people, 474 households, and 328 families residing in the town. The population density was 1,555.6 inhabitants per square mile (600.6/km^{2}). There were 505 housing units at an average density of 674.3 per square mile (260.3/km^{2}). The racial makeup of the town was 43.43% White, 53.91% African American, 0.26% Native American, 1.46% from other races, and 0.94% from two or more races. Hispanic or Latino of any race were 2.58% of the population.

There were 474 households, out of which 30.2% had children under the age of 18 living with them, 45.4% were married couples living together, 17.3% had a female householder with no husband present, and 30.6% were non-families. 27.0% of all households were made up of individuals, and 13.1% had someone living alone who was 65 years of age or older. The average household size was 2.45 and the average family size was 3.01.

In the town, the population was spread out, with 24.2% under the age of 18, 8.5% from 18 to 24, 26.1% from 25 to 44, 25.6% from 45 to 64, and 15.6% who were 65 years of age or older. The median age was 41 years. For every 100 females, there were 88.5 males. For every 100 females age 18 and over, there were 84.0 males.

The median income for a household in the town was $27,188, and the median income for a family was $39,861. Males had a median income of $26,500 versus $20,909 for females. The per capita income for the town was $13,533. About 11.0% of families and 14.7% of the population were below the poverty line, including 12.6% of those under age 18 and 23.1% of those age 65 or over.

== Education ==
Elm City includes two public schools, Elm City Elementary (formerly known as Frederick Douglas School), and Elm City Middle School (formerly known as Elm City School/Elm City High School). It has a good reputation for sports. Jamie Watson, a former NBA athlete, is from Elm City. UNC Basketball alum John Virgil is also from Elm City.
