= W. H. Langley House =

Historic house in North Carolina, United States

- U.S. National Register of Historic Places
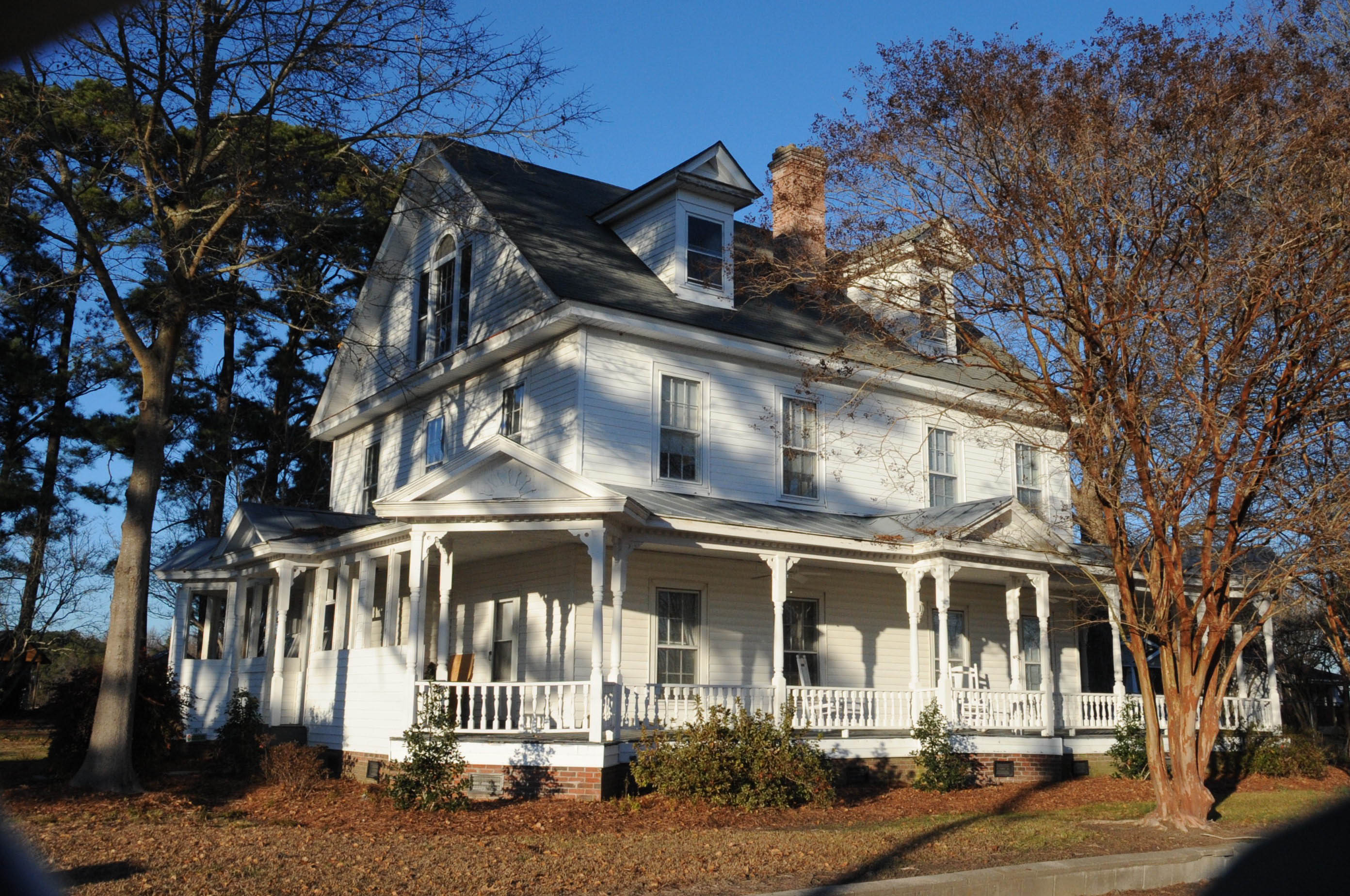

- Location within North Carolina Location within the United States
- Location: N side of SR 1003, near Elm City, North Carolina
- Coordinates: 35°48′31″N 77°52′45″W
- Area: 205 acres (83 ha)
- Built: c. 1865, 1911
- Built by: Unknown; Winstead, Mr.
- Architectural style: Colonial Revival, Bungalow/craftsman
- MPS: Wilson MRA
- NRHP reference No.: 86000763
- Added to NRHP: February 13, 1986

W. H. Langley House is a historic home located near Elm City, Wilson County, North Carolina. It was built about 1865 as a simple three-bay single-story dwelling with two exterior end chimneys. It was enlarged and remodelled in the Colonial Revival style in 1911. It is a 2 1/2-story, five-bay, frame dwelling with a steeply pitched gable roof and rear kitchen ell. It features a complex wraparound porch, projecting pedimented pavilions, and Palladian windows on the gable ends.

It was listed on the National Register of Historic Places in 1986.
