= Rippey Cobblestone Farmhouse =

Historic house in New York, United States

- U.S. National Register of Historic Places
- Location within New York Location within the United States
- Location: 1227 Leet Rd., Seneca, New York
- Coordinates: 42°50′28″N 77°2′19″W
- Area: 2 acres (0.81 ha)
- Built: 1854
- Architectural style: Greek Revival, Italianate
- MPS: Cobblestone Architecture of New York State MPS
- NRHP reference No.: 92001051
- Added to NRHP: October 06, 1992

Rippey Cobblestone Farmhouse is a historic home located at 1227 Leet Road in Phelps, Ontario County, New York. It was constructed in 1854 and is an example of a Greek Revival or Italianate style, cobblestone domestic architecture. The house consists of a two-story main block with a one-story side wing and is one of the most elaborate, finely crafted cobblestone residences in the Finger Lakes region. The exterior walls are built primarily of small, red, oval, lake washed cobbles. It is among the approximately 101 cobblestone buildings in Ontario County and nine in the town of Seneca.

It was listed on the National Register of Historic Places in 1992.
