= Elm City Municipal Historic District =

Historic district in North Carolina, United States

- U.S. National Register of Historic Places
- U.S. Historic district
- Location within North Carolina Location within the United States
- Location: Roughly bounded by North, Pender and Branch, Wilson, and Anderson Sts., Elm City, North Carolina
- Coordinates: 35.80745°N 77.86115°W
- Area: 43 acres (17 ha)
- Built: 1873
- Architect: Rackley, Claudius C.; Et al.
- Architectural style: Classical Revival, Early Commercial, Victorian Cottage
- MPS: Wilson MRA
- NRHP reference No.: 86000770
- Added to NRHP: February 13, 1986

Elm City Municipal Historic District is a national historic district located at Elm City, Wilson County, North Carolina. It encompasses 85 contributing buildings in the railroad town of Lucama. The district developed between about 1873 to 1930 and includes notable examples of Classical Revival, Early Commercial, and Victorian style architecture. Notable buildings include the Batts & Williams Store (1884), G. A. Barnes Store (1912), Dawes Building (1914), Elm City Bank (1920s), Holden House (c. 1875), A. C. Dixon House, G. A. Barnes House (c. 1895-1905), W. G. Sharpe House (c. 1911), Dr. Robert Putney, Sr., House (c. 1919-1920), and L. C. Cobb House (1927).

It was listed on the National Register of Historic Places in 1986.
