= Levi Barden Cobblestone Farmhouse =

Historic house in New York, United States

- U.S. National Register of Historic Places
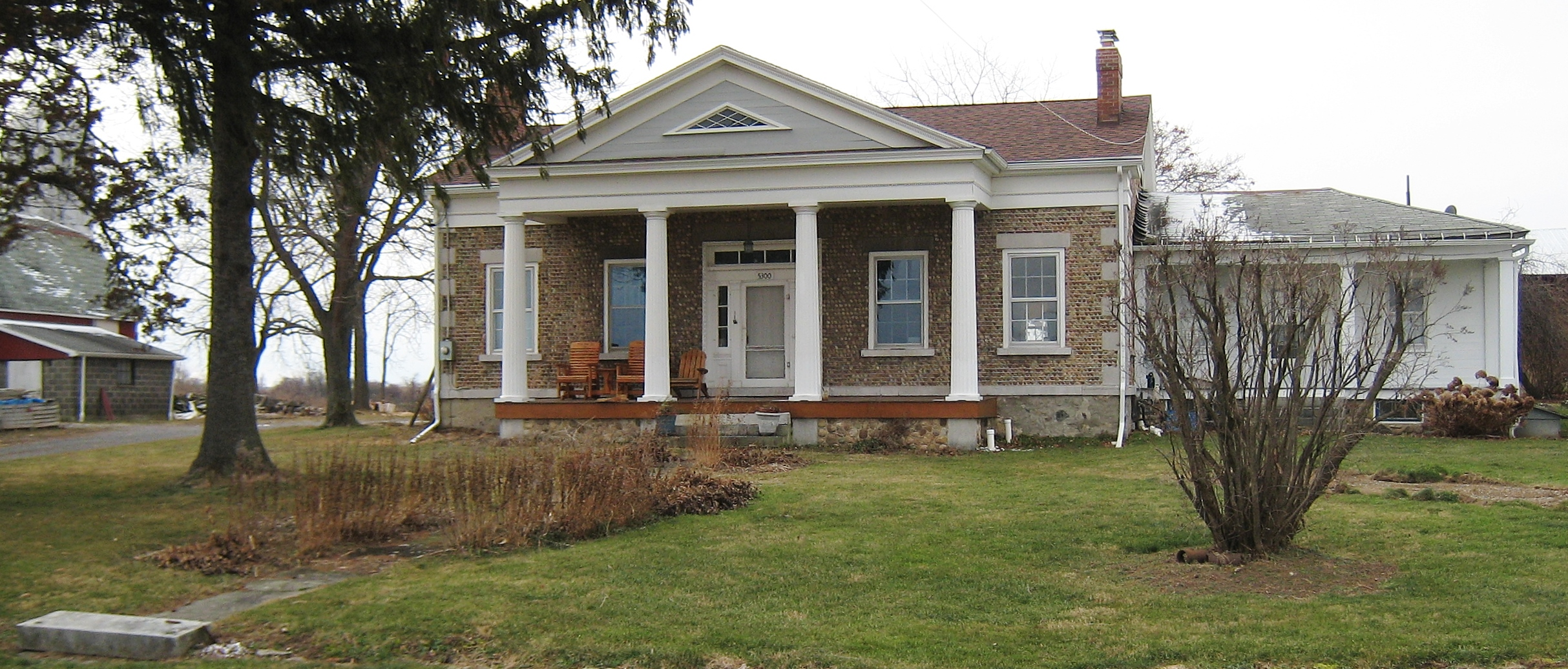

- Location within New York Location within the United States
- Location: 5300 Wabash Rd., Seneca, New York
- Coordinates: 42°46′16″N 77°2′18″W
- Area: 230 acres (93 ha)
- Built: 1836
- Architectural style: Greek Revival
- MPS: Cobblestone Architecture of New York State MPS
- NRHP reference No.: 03000690
- Added to NRHP: July 25, 2003

Levi Barden Cobblestone Farmhouse is a historic home located at Seneca in Ontario County, New York. It is a cobblestone structure that was constructed in 1836 in the Greek Revival style.

It was listed on the National Register of Historic Places in 2003.

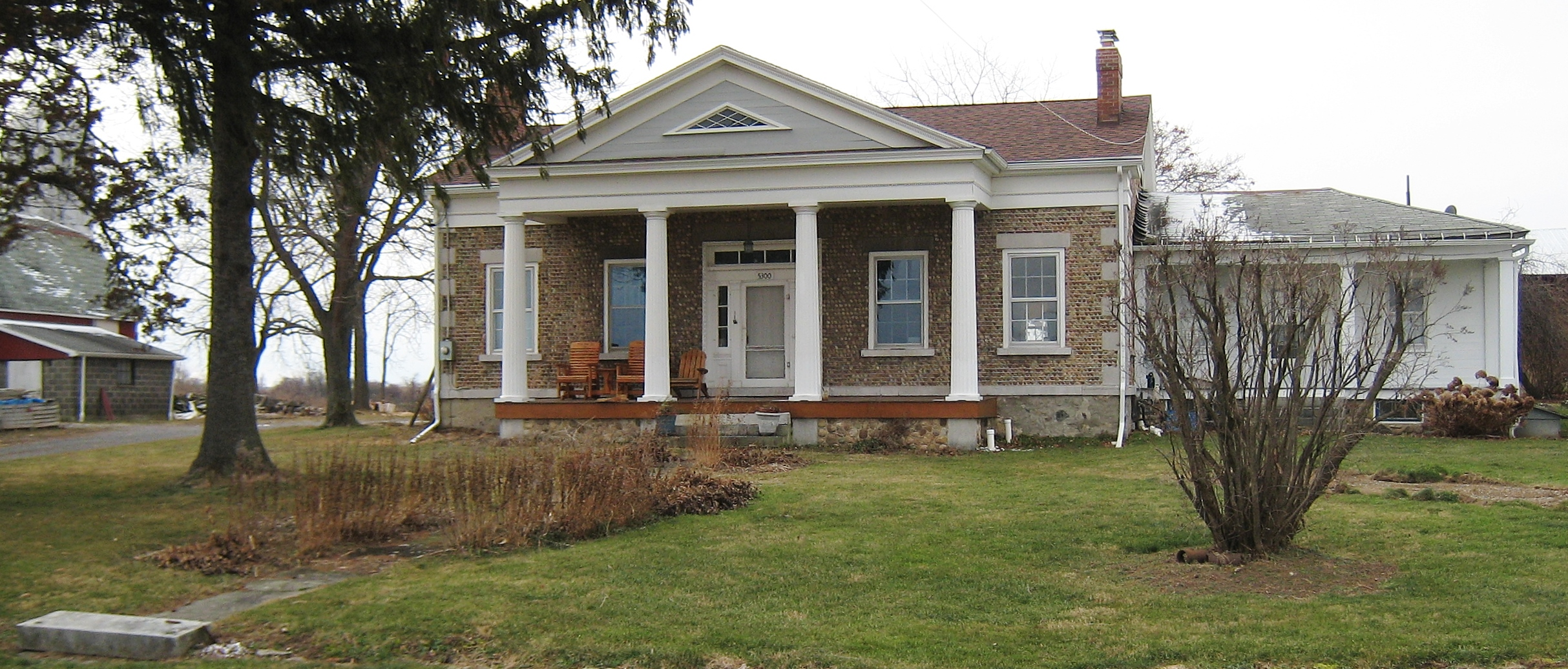

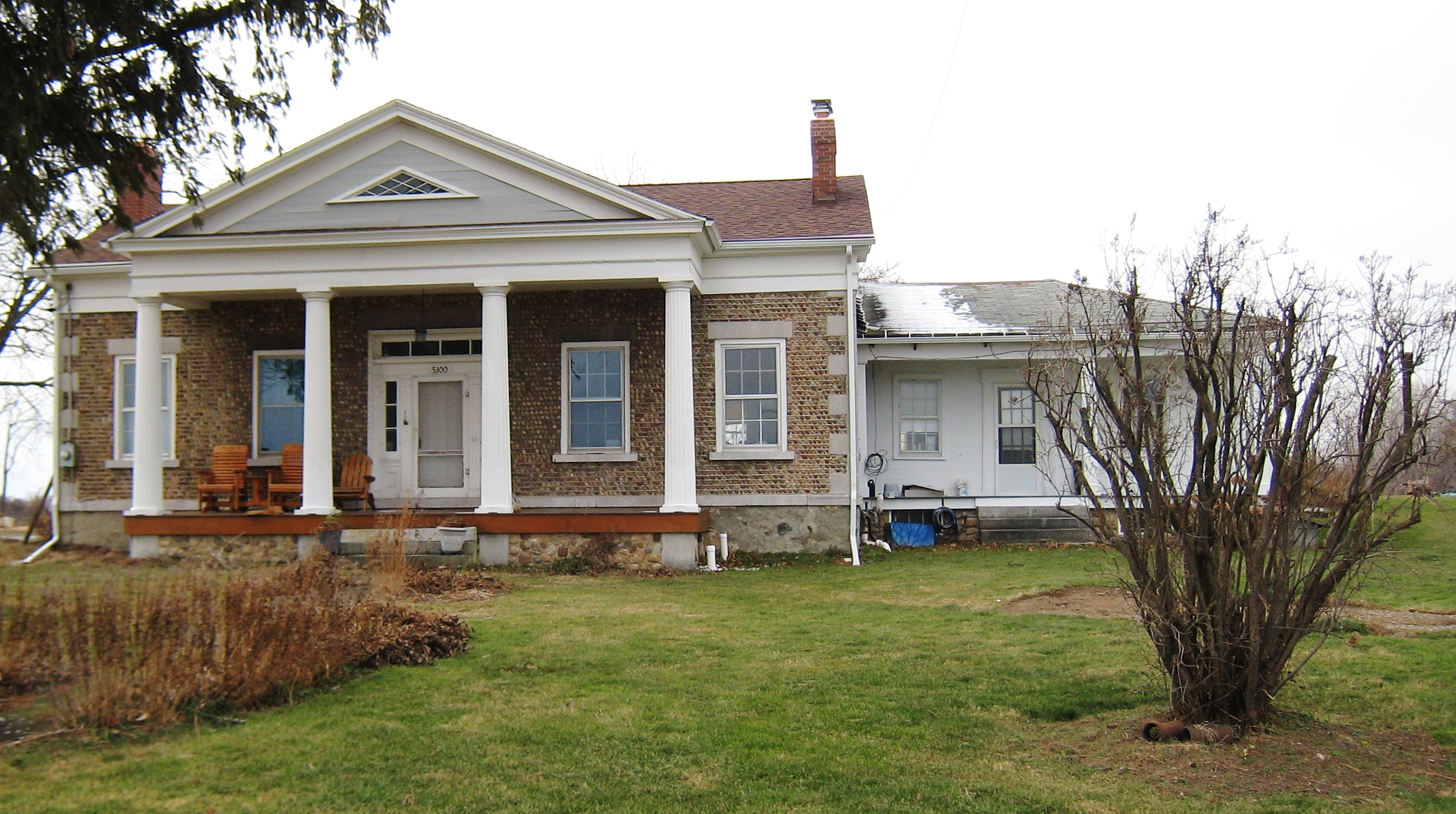

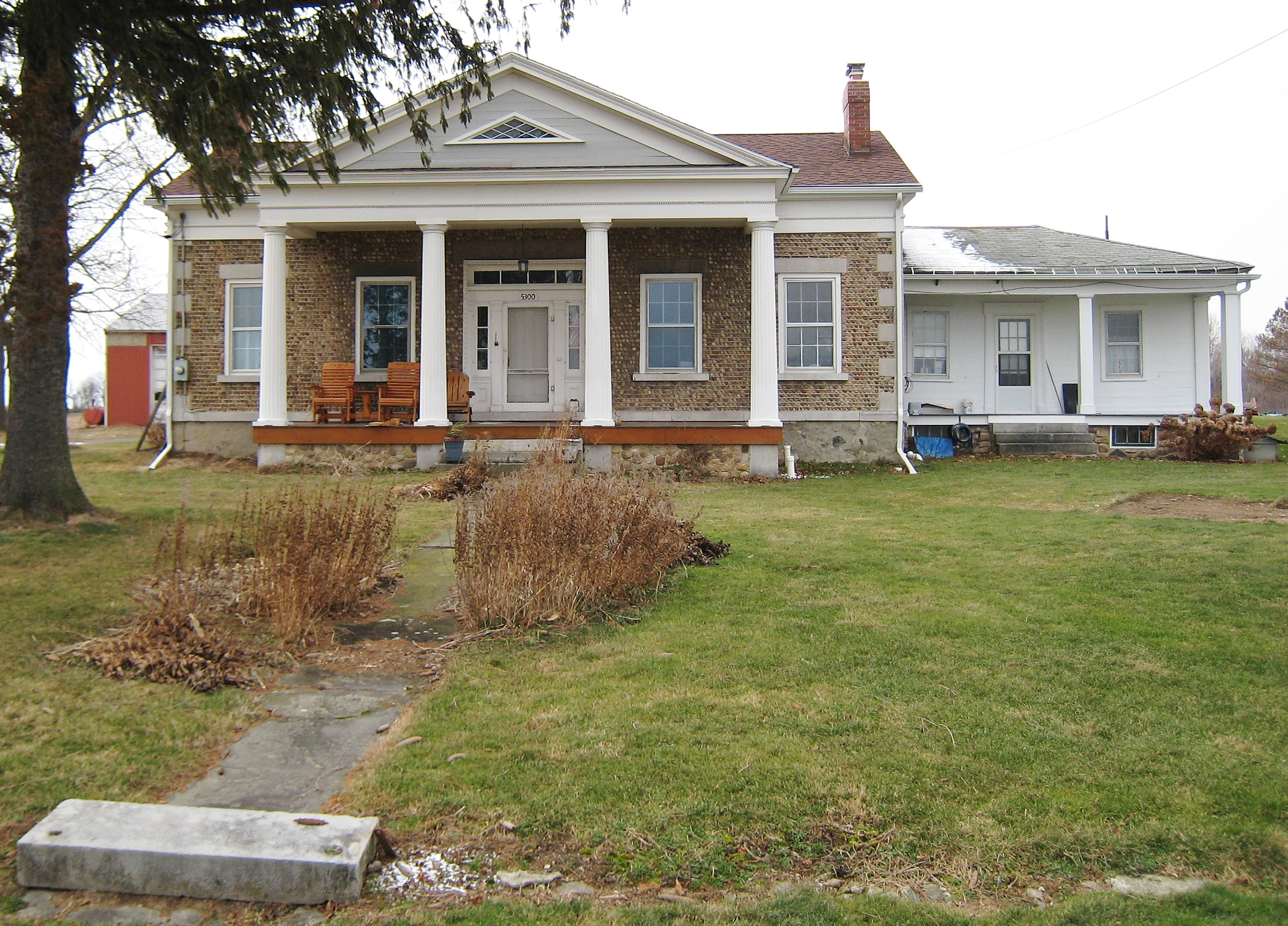
