= Seneca, New York =

Town in Ontario County, New York, US

- Town
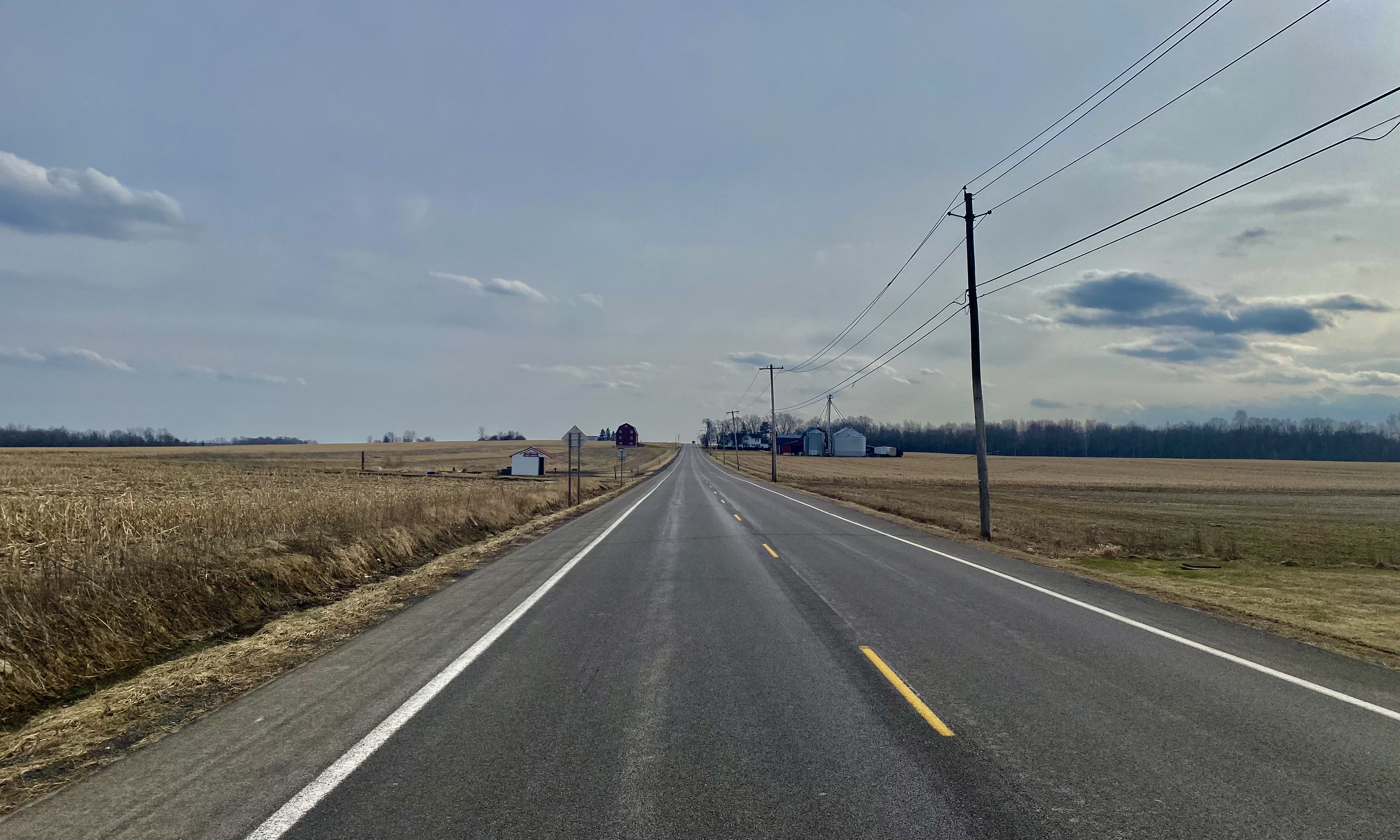
- Route 14A

- Location within the state of New York
- Coordinates: 42°50′13″N 77°4′32″W
- Country: United States
- State: New York
- County: Ontario

Government
  - Type: Town Council
  - Town Supervisor: John T. Sheppard (R)
  - Town Council: Members' List: • Edward Hansen, Jr. (R); • Howard Keeney (R); • Charles A. Smith (R); • Andrew R. Wickham (R)

Area
  - Total: 50.45 sq mi (130.67 km^{2})
  - Land: 50.45 sq mi (130.67 km^{2})
  - Water: 0 sq mi (0.00 km^{2})
- Elevation: 866 ft (264 m)

Population (2020)
  - Total: 2,658 ▼
  - Estimate (2021): 2,648
  - Density: 53.7/sq mi (20.75/km^{2})
- Time zone: UTC-5 (Eastern (EST))
  - Summer (DST): UTC-4 (EDT)
- FIPS code: 36-66289
- GNIS feature ID: 0979480
- Website: https://www.townofsenecany.gov/

Seneca is a town in Ontario County, New York, United States. The population was 2,658 at the 2020 census. The town is named after the indigenous Seneca people.

The Town of Seneca is on the southern border of the county and is southwest of the City of Geneva.

The Town of West Seneca in Erie County added "west" to its name to avoid confusion with the Town of Seneca.

== History ==
The region was the territory of the Seneca people, a nation of the Haudenosaunee, and the sites of many important villages are in the town or the surrounding area; Kanadaseaga is one.

The area was part of the Phelps and Gorham Purchase. Settlement commenced around 1790, the year after the county was formed. A "District of Seneca" was created judicially in 1789 at the time the county was established, but its extent and subdivisions are not clearly known. The town was finally organized in 1793.

In 1872, the northeast part of the town was used to form the Town of Geneva, taking with it most of the historic Seneca communities and sites.

The Levi Barden Cobblestone Farmhouse, Thomas Barron House, and Rippey Cobblestone Farmhouse are listed on the National Register of Historic Places.

== Geography ==
According to the United States Census Bureau, the town has a total area of 50.4 square miles (131 km^{2}), all land.

The southern town line is the border of Yates County. The town is located in the Finger Lakes region and is northwest of Seneca Lake.

Conjoined U.S. Route 20 and New York State Route 5 pass across the town. New York State Route 14A is a north-south highway in the town. New York State Route 245 is an east-west highway in the town. NY-14A and NY245 are briefly conjoined near the eastern town line.

== Demographics ==
Historical population
Census	Pop.	Note	%±
1820	4,802		—
1830	6,161		28.3%
1840	7,073		14.8%
1850	8,505		20.2%
1860	8,448		−0.7%
1870	9,188		8.8%
1880	2,877		−68.7%
1890	2,690		−6.5%
1900	2,654		−1.3%
1910	2,669		0.6%
1920	2,638		−1.2%
1930	2,635		−0.1%
1940	2,570		−2.5%
1950	2,535		−1.4%
1960	2,698		6.4%
1970	2,808		4.1%
1980	2,749		−2.1%
1990	2,747		−0.1%
2000	2,731		−0.6%
2010	2,721		−0.4%
2020	2,658		−2.3%
2021 (est.)	2,648		−0.4%
U.S. Decennial Census

As of the census of 2000, there were 2,731 people, 967 households, and 781 families residing in the town. The population density was 54.1 inhabitants per square mile (20.9/km^{2}). There were 1,032 housing units at an average density of 20.5 per square mile (7.9/km^{2}). The racial makeup of the town was 97.84% White, 0.48% African American, 0.15% Native American, 0.26% Asian, 0.48% from other races, and 0.81% from two or more races. Hispanic or Latino of any race were 1.50% of the population.

There were 967 households, out of which 37.3% had children under the age of 18 living with them, 67.7% were married couples living together, 8.9% had a female householder with no husband present, and 19.2% were non-families. 15.4% of all households were made up of individuals, and 6.2% had someone living alone who was 65 years of age or older. The average household size was 2.81 and the average family size was 3.10.

In the town, the population was spread out, with 27.3% under the age of 18, 6.0% from 18 to 24, 27.6% from 25 to 44, 26.5% from 45 to 64, and 12.6% who were 65 years of age or older. The median age was 39 years. For every 100 females, there were 101.5 males. For every 100 females age 18 and over, there were 100.5 males.

The median income for a household in the town was $48,007, and the median income for a family was $51,705. Males had a median income of $31,301 versus $27,146 for females. The per capita income for the town was $19,165. About 2.0% of families and 3.5% of the population were below the poverty line, including 2.2% of those under age 18 and 8.3% of those age 65 or over.

== Communities and locations in the Town of Seneca ==
- Flint (formerly "Flint Creek") – A hamlet on US-20/NY-5 at Flint Creek.
- Flint Creek – An important stream in the town.
- Hall (formerly "Halls Corners") – A hamlet in the south part of the town on Route NY-14A.
- Pierson Corners – A location at the junction of County Roads 4 and 20 at the north town line in the northwest part of the town.
- Seneca – A historical location northeast of Hall.
- Seneca Castle – A hamlet in the northern part of the town on County Road 4. It was formerly known as "Castleton."
- Stanley (formerly "Stanleys Corners") – A hamlet on NY-245 near the center of the town.
