= Barons =

Barons may refer to:

- Baron (plural), a rank of nobility
- Barons (surname), a Latvian surname
- Barons, Alberta, Canada
- Barons (TV series), a 2022 Australian drama series
- The Barons, a 2009 Belgian film

== Sports ==
- Birmingham Barons, a Minor League Baseball team
- Cleveland Barons (disambiguation), several former ice hockey teams
- Oklahoma City Barons, a former ice hockey team in the American Hockey League
- Solihull Barons, an English ice hockey team
- Barons, the nickname of Brewton–Parker College athletics teams

== See also ==
- Barron's (disambiguation)
