= Barron (given name) =

Barron is a masculine given name, a transferred use of the surname. Baron is a spelling variant. The name Barron increased in use for boys in the United States following the election of President Donald Trump, whose youngest son is Barron Trump.

== Men ==
- Barron Cangley (1922–2015), English cricketer
- Barron Claiborne, American photographer and cinematographer
- Barron Collier (1873–1939), American multi-business entrepreneur who became the largest landowner and developer in the US state of Florida
- Barron Field (author) (1786–1846), English-born Australian judge and poet
- Barron Hilton (1927–2019), American business magnate and philanthropist
- Barron Kilner (1852–1922), English rugby union footballer and administrator
- Barron H. Lerner (born 1960), American doctor, medical researcher and professor
- Barron Miles (born 1972), American-born Canadian Football League defensive coordinator and former player
- Barron Trump (born 2006), son of Donald and Melania Trump
