= Martin Van Buren Barron House =

Historic house in Wisconsin, United States

- U.S. National Register of Historic Places
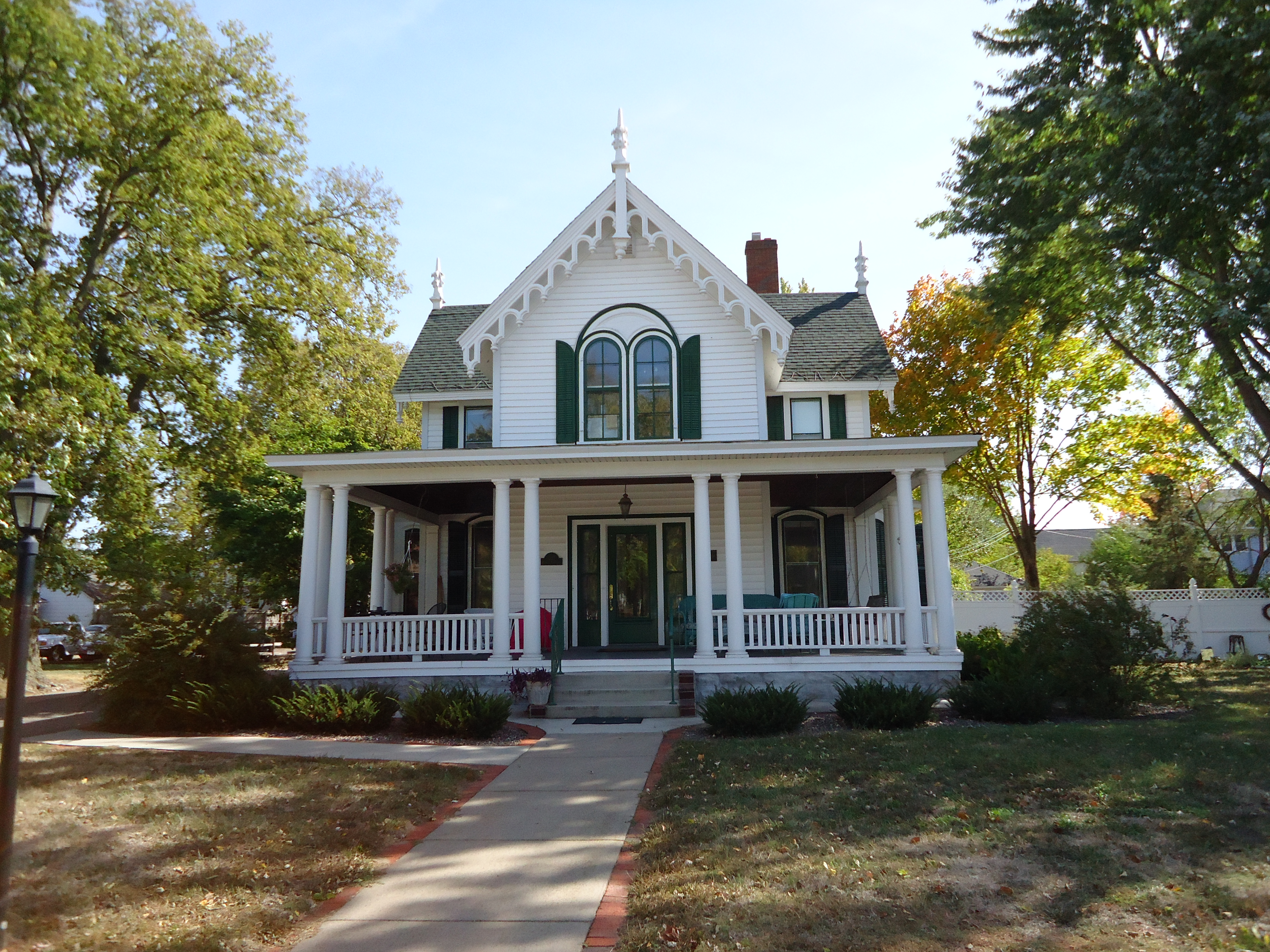
- Martin Van Buren Barron House
- Location: 221 Washington St., Eau Claire, Wisconsin
- Coordinates: 44°48′15″N 91°29′33″W
- Area: less than one acre
- Built: 1871
- Architect: Bangs & Fish
- Architectural style: Carpenter Gothic
- MPS: Eau Claire MRA
- NRHP reference No.: 83003375
- Added to NRHP: January 28, 1983

The Martin Van Buren Barron House is located in Eau Claire, Wisconsin.

== History ==
Martin Van Buren Barron was a prominent businessman and local politician. The house was listed on the National Register of Historic Places in 1983 and on the State Register of Historic Places in 1989.
