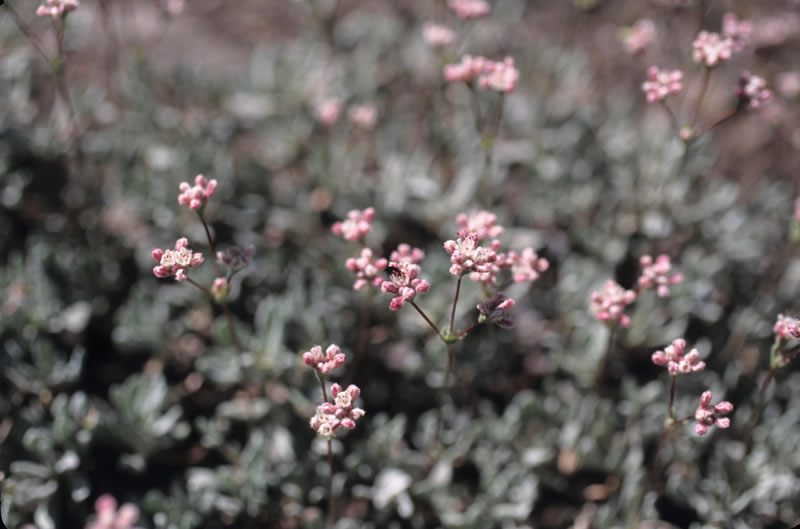

Conservation status
- Critically Imperiled (NatureServe)

Scientific classification
- Kingdom: Plantae
- Clade: Embryophytes
- Clade: Tracheophytes
- Clade: Spermatophytes
- Clade: Angiosperms
- Clade: Eudicots
- Order: Caryophyllales
- Family: Polygonaceae
- Genus: Eriogonum
- Species: E. spectabile

Binomial name
- Eriogonum spectabile B.L.Corbin, Reveal & R.Baron

= Eriogonum spectabile =

Species of wild buckwheat

Eriogonum spectabile is a rare species of wild buckwheat known by the common name Barron's buckwheat. It is endemic to Plumas County, California, where it is known from two occurrences in Lassen National Forest near Chester. There are approximately 250 individuals in existence. It grows in scrubby, forested mountain habitat, only on glaciated andesite substrates. This rare plant was discovered in 1997 and described to science as a new species in 2001.

This is a small, compact shrub growing in a mat up to 25 centimeters wide and 15 tall. The spreading stems bear woolly foliage, each leaf with an oval blade up to 2 centimeters long by 1 wide. The plant blooms with slender, erect flowering stems bearing umbels of flowers. The flowers are white, aging pink, hairy and glandular, and about half a centimeter long.

The main threat to this species is logging. Other threats include herbivory, competition with other plants, climate change, and changes in the fire regime of its native forest.
