= Barron Building =

Coordinates: 51°02′46″N 114°04′28″W

The Barron Building is an eleven-storey office tower located at 610 8th Avenue Southwest in Calgary, Alberta, Canada. Designed by architect Jack Cawston and built between 1949 and 1951, it is one of Canada's foremost examples of Art Moderne architecture. In 2003, the Alberta Association of Architects recognized it as Significant Alberta Architecture.

== History and architectural significance ==
Following the discovery of Leduc No. 1 on 13 February 1947, the city of Calgary rapidly became a centre for Canada's oil industry. Calgary businessman and lawyer Jacob Bell Barron (1888–1965) commissioned local architect Jack Cawston (1911–1967) from the firm Cawston and Stevenson to design a modern office tower that could accommodate oil companies establishing headquarters in the city. At the time, Calgary's skyline was dominated by neoclassical architecture, making the Barron Building one of the city's first expressions of modernism. Other early modernist structures in Calgary include:

- the Utilities Building (1939, 115 6th Avenue SW)
- Alberta Government Telephones Building (1929, 119 6th Avenue SW)
- Dmitri Skaken House (1947, 1131 Colborne Crescent SW)
- Glenmore Water Treatment Plant (1933, 5300 19th Street SW).

The building cost $1.25 million and was constructed by Larwill and Stevenson Construction Company. It officially opened in 1951, with original tenants including Sun Oil Company (Sunoco) and Halliburton. From 1955 to 1969 the building was known as the Mobil Oil Building.

== Design and features ==
The Barron Building's Art Moderne style is defined by streamlined and geometric forms, with the following architectural elements:

- Materials: The exterior is clad in buff-coloured brick, with the central bay and upper floors featuring Tyndall limestone. The ground floor is finished in polished black marble.
- Windows: The building's ribbon windows, influenced by Le Corbusier, enhance its modernist aesthetic.
- Uptown Theatre: The first three storeys housed the Uptown Theatre, which included a mezzanine level.
- Penthouse: A penthouse on the roof was originally occupied by Jacob Barron and expanded in the late 1950s to cover most of the roof, leaving a small balcony in the southwest corner.

== Heritage challenges and transition (2000s–2010s) ==
By the early 2000s, the Barron Building experienced increasing vacancy, with its last tenant, the Uptown Theatre, closing in November 2011. In June 2012, the building was added to the Top Ten Endangered Places List by the Heritage Canada Foundation due to concerns about its deteriorating condition.

In April 2014, Alberta Culture proposed designating the Barron Building as a provincial historic resource, which would have placed restrictions on exterior alterations. However, following discussions with the property owner, the designation was ultimately not pursued, allowing for potential redevelopment.

== Redevelopment and restoration (2015–present) ==
Strategic Group purchased the Barron Building in 2007, recognizing its historical and architectural significance. In 2015, the company announced plans for redevelopment, initially proposing a glass tower addition and the demolition of the Uptown Theatre. However, by 2022, the focus shifted toward adaptive reuse, with plans to convert the building into 118 residential rental units with street-level retail, preserving key historic architectural elements.

In addition to its architectural and historical significance, the Barron Building was also featured in HBO's The Last of Us, the largest television production in Alberta's history. Filming took place in and around the building in 2022, with the exterior dressed in post-apocalyptic set design to depict a ravaged Kansas City. The show's premiere in 2023 brought renewed attention to Calgary's historic downtown landmarks, including the Barron Building, further cementing its cultural legacy.

After some delays, construction resumed in 2024, with work now progressing to revitalize the Barron Building as a modern residential and commercial space while maintaining its historical character.
