= Barron Cangley =

English cricketer

Personal information
- Full name: Barron George Merriman Cangley
- Born: 12 September 1922; Blakesley, Northamptonshire, England
- Died: 2015 (aged 92–93); Victoria, Australia
- Batting: Right-handed

Domestic team information
- Years: Team
- 1947: Cambridge University
- 1946: Cambridgeshire

Career statistics
Competition	FC
Matches	8
Runs scored	295
Batting average	22.69
100s/50s	–/1
Top score	76
Balls bowled	–
Wickets	–
Bowling average	–
5 wickets in innings	–
10 wickets in match	–
Best bowling	–
Catches/stumpings	3/–
- Source: Cricinfo, 20 July 2010

Barron George Merriman Cangley (12 September 1922 – 2015) was an English cricketer. Cangley was a right-handed batsman.

He was born at Blakesley, Northamptonshire in September 1922. In 1946, Cangley represented Cambridgeshire in 2 Minor Counties Championship matches against Norfolk and Bedfordshire.

Cangley also played first-class cricket, where he represented Cambridge University in 8 first-class matches, making his debut for the university against Sussex and playing his final first-class match against Oxford University. All 8 of his first-class matches came in 1947. In his 8 first-class matches, he scored 295 runs at a batting average of 22.69, with a single half century high score of 76.

He died in 2015 in Victoria, Australia.
