= BARON.E =

Swiss pop music duo

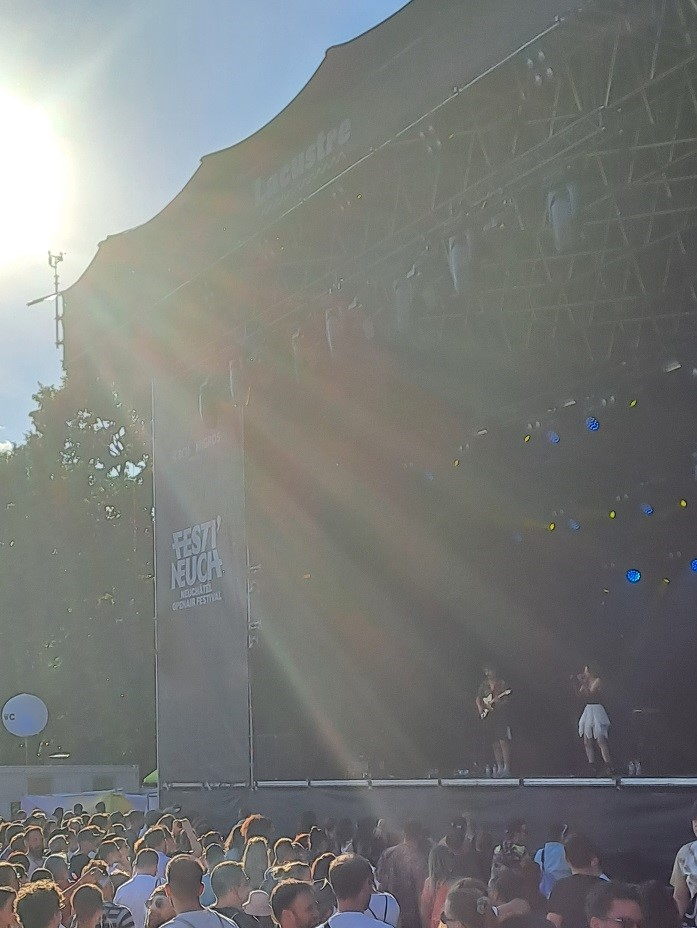
- BARON.E in festineuch in june 2023.

Background information
- Origin: Fribourg, Switzerland
- Genres: Indie Rock; Indie Pop; Electropop; French Pop
- Years active: 2019 – 2024
- Past members: Faustine Pochon; Arnaud Rolle
- Website: Baronbarone.com

BARON.E (pronounced Baron Baronne) was a Swiss electronic and Indie pop music duo formed in 2019 consisting of Faustine Pochon and Arnaud Rolle. Their debut EP, Jeunesse Dorée, was released on 13 March 2020. They went on to release two more EPs before disbanding in 2024.

== History ==
BARON.E was composed of Faustine Pochon and Arnaud Rolle, who are both from Fribourg in the French-speaking part of Switzerland. The duo was formed in 2019. They have cited their influence from all forms of rock music as well as contemporary French music. BARON.E sings in French. The duo blends indie pop and electropop genres in their music.

After their single "Un verre d'ego" was ranked among the best songs of 2019 by Les Inrockuptibles, the duo began to receive international attention.

Their first EP, Jeunesse Dorée, was released on 13 March 2020. In March 2020 the duo performed on an American tour, including at the 2020 Francophonie Cultural Festival in Washington, D.C. They were set to perform at the Atlanta Francophonie Festival on 25 March 2020, but the performance was cancelled due to the COVID-19 pandemic.

Baron.e was granted an artistic residency in Paris, funded by the city of Fribourg, in 2022. Their residency at the Jean Tinguely studio at the Cité des Arts lasted from 1 September 2023 to 31 August 2024.

They released their second EP, Créature, on 4 November 2021 under PIAS France.

On 7 April 2023, they released their third EP, Nuit noire.

The group disbanded in 2024.

== Discography ==
=== Extended plays ===
Title	Album details	Peak positions
Jeunesse Dorée	Released: 13 March 2020; Label: PIAS France; Formats: Digital download	
Créature	Released: 4 November 2021; Label: PIAS France; Formats: Digital download	
Nuit noire	Released: 7 April 2023; Label; Formats: Digital download	
