= Webb-Barron-Wells House =

Historic house in North Carolina, United States

- U.S. National Register of Historic Places
- Location within North Carolina Location within the United States
- Location: E side SR 1512, near Elm City, North Carolina
- Coordinates: 35°45′37″N 77°44′08″W
- Area: 201.5 acres (81.5 ha)
- Built: c. 1793-1820
- Architectural style: Coastal Cottage
- MPS: Wilson MRA
- NRHP reference No.: 86000769
- Added to NRHP: February 13, 1986

Webb-Barron-Wells House is a historic home located near Elm City, Wilson County, North Carolina. It was probably built between about 1793 and 1820, and is a 1 1/2-story, double pile, frame coastal cottage with a hall-and-parlor plan. It has a steeply pitched roofline and exterior end chimneys. A kitchen wing was added about 1949.

It was listed on the National Register of Historic Places in 1986.
