= Baron, Prayagraj =

Village in Uttar Pradesh, India

Baron is a village in Prayagraj, Uttar Pradesh, India.
