= Cleveland Barons =

The name Cleveland Barons has been used by three professional hockey teams and one junior team.

- Cleveland Barons (NHL), the National Hockey League team that played between 1976 and 1978
- Cleveland Barons (1937–1973), the original American Hockey League (AHL) team
- Cleveland Barons (2001–2006), the former San Jose Sharks AHL affiliate
- Cleveland Jr. Barons, a former Junior A team in the NAHL that still retains a number of youth teams in the Cleveland area
