= Thomas Barron House =

Historic house in New York, United States

- U.S. National Register of Historic Places
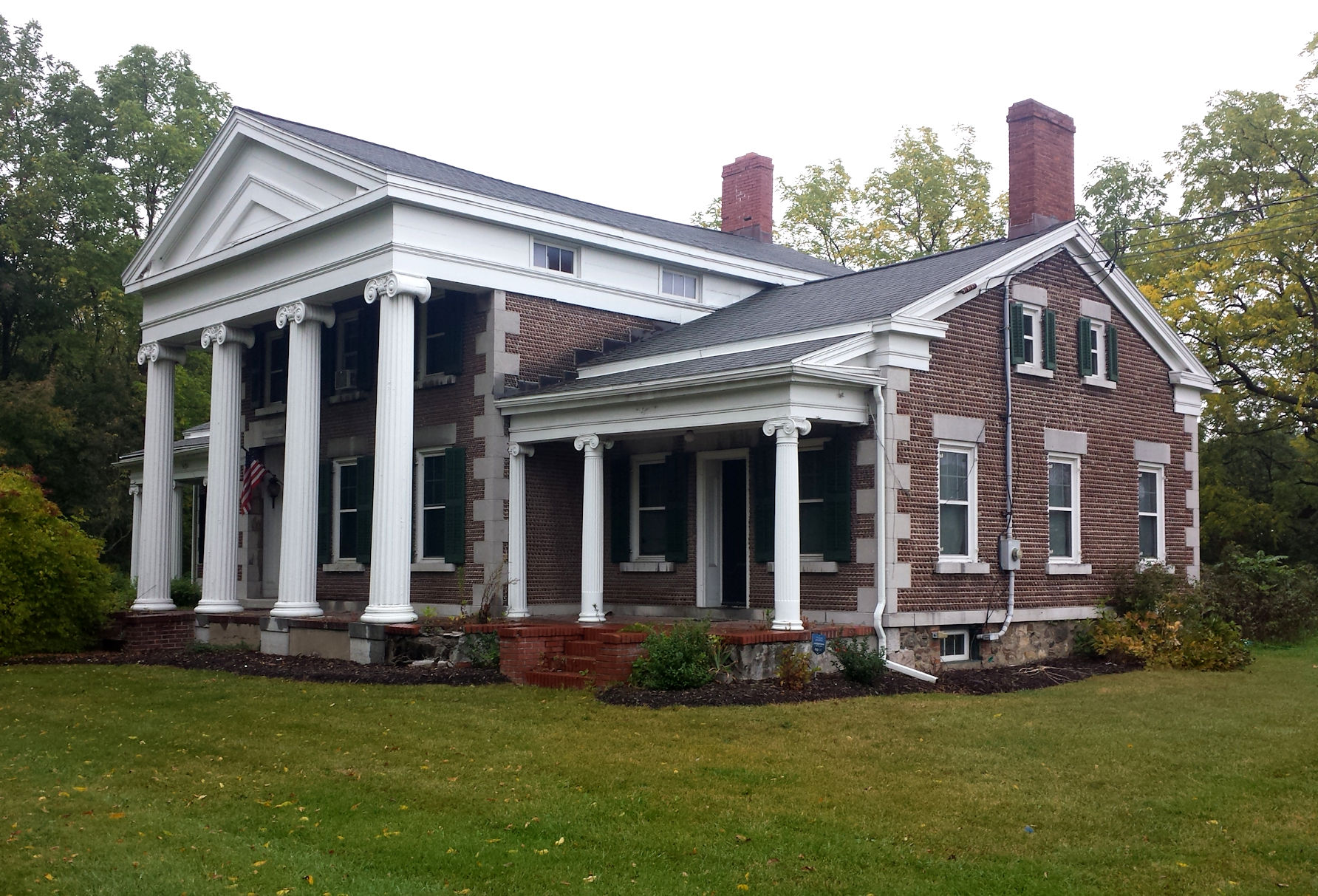

- Location within New York Location within the United States
- Location: 1160 Canandaigua Rd., Seneca, New York
- Coordinates: 42°51′45″N 77°2′1″W
- Area: 13.3 acres (5.4 ha)
- Built: 1848
- Architect: Barron, Thomas
- Architectural style: Greek Revival
- NRHP reference No.: 88001854
- Added to NRHP: October 6, 1988

The Thomas Barron House is a historic house located at 1160 Canandaigua Road in Seneca, Ontario County, New York.

== Description and history ==
It was constructed in 1848 by Thomas Barron, and is a distinct example of vernacular, Greek Revival style, cobblestone domestic architecture. The house consists of a two-story main block flanked by 1 1/2-story wings. The exterior walls are built of oval-shaped, red sandstone lake-washed cobbles. The main block features a pedimented portico supported by four large fluted columns of the Ionic order.

It was listed on the National Register of Historic Places on October 6, 1988.
