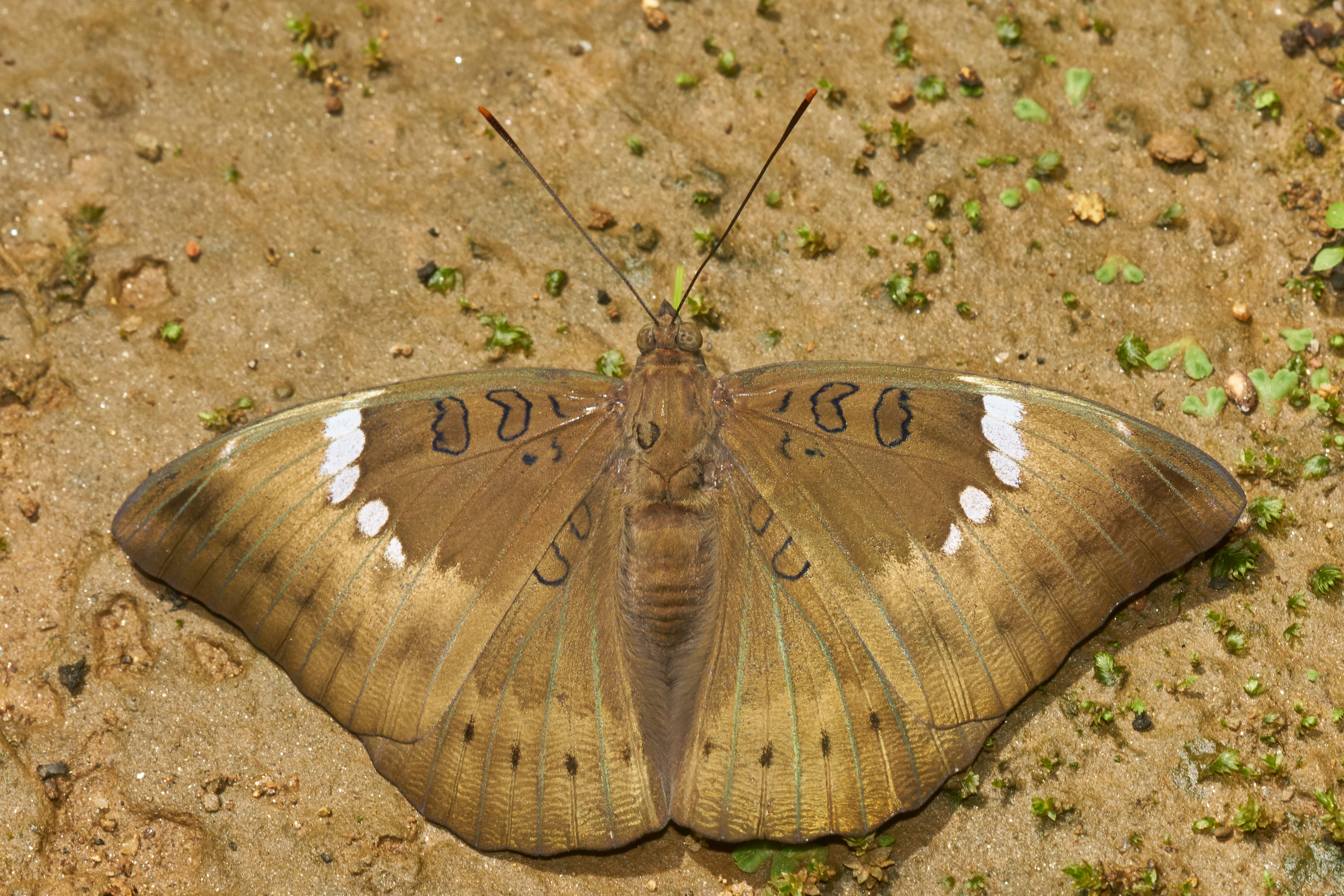
- Female

Scientific classification
- Kingdom: Animalia
- Phylum: Arthropoda
- Class: Insecta
- Order: Lepidoptera
- Family: Nymphalidae
- Genus: Euthalia
- Species: E. aconthea

Binomial name
- Euthalia aconthea (Cramer, 1777)

Synonyms
- Euthalia garuda (Moore, 1859)

= Euthalia aconthea =

Common baron

Species of butterfly

Euthalia aconthea, the common baron, often called simply baron, is a medium-sized nymphalid butterfly native to Sri Lanka, India and southeast Asia. It flies with stiff wing beats and often glides. The wing is not flapped very far below the horizontal.

== Description ==
The male is brown with slight traces of olive. The forewing has two transverse short black lines at the base, a black loop across the middle, and another beyond the apex of the cell, with their centres dark brown, followed by an angulated discal dark brown band bordered outwardly by a series of five white spots; two preapical white spots beyond and a broad, somewhat diffuse, subterminal black band broadening over the apex and angulated inwards in interspace 1. Hindwing shaded with dark brown at base, two crescent-shaped dark brown loop-like marks in cell; a discal series of dark brown, elongate, outwardly acute, inwardly diffuse, somewhat hastate (spear-shaped) spots, followed by a subterminal series of small spots of the same colour. Underside ochraceous brown. Forewing on the underside shows five transverse slender black lines across cell; a black spot below median vein; discal and preapical white spots as on the upperside, succeeded by a postdiscal series of somewhat diffuse crescent-shaped black marks, and a broad terminal pale lilac band not reaching the apex, bordered narrowly along the termen with dark brown. Hindwing with four or five slender black loops at base, a posteriorly obsolescent postdiscal series of diffuse black marks and a subterminal series of black dots; the termen near apex touched with pale lilac. Antennae, head, thorax and abdomen dark brown, the antennae ochraceous at the tip, the body paler beneath.

The female is similar but of a paler shade. Upperside forewing differs from that of the male in the absence of the dark discal and subterminal bands, and in the series of discal spots being elongate, much larger. The hindwing has the discal series of outwardly pointed black markings only as traces. Underside similar to that of the male, but the ground colour more ochraceous, the markings larger, more diffuse.

The caterpillar of E. aconthea is green in colour, with a blue/yellow line on its back, designed to camouflage it against leaves. It features branching spines which protrude from its dorsal surface, covering the whole animal except for a line along its back. The spines lie flat against the leaf, which is also its food source.

Race vasanta, Moore is found in Sri Lanka. It resembles the nominate race, but in the male the white spots on the forewing are entirely absent, above and below; the discal hand on both forewing and hindwing on the upperside is more irregular and not nearly so well defined; on the forewing the interspace between it and the subterminal band and on the hindwing the posterior half suffused with dark green 5 the terminal margin of the fore and anterior half of the hindwing tinged with pink. Underside similar, but both the ground colour and markings paler; the latter less prominent. Female. Differs prominently on both upper and under sides in the discal row of white spots being more oblique and complete, extending from the costa to near the apex of interspace 2. Race acontius is found in the Andaman Islands.

The wingspan is 68–79 mm (2.7–3.1 in).

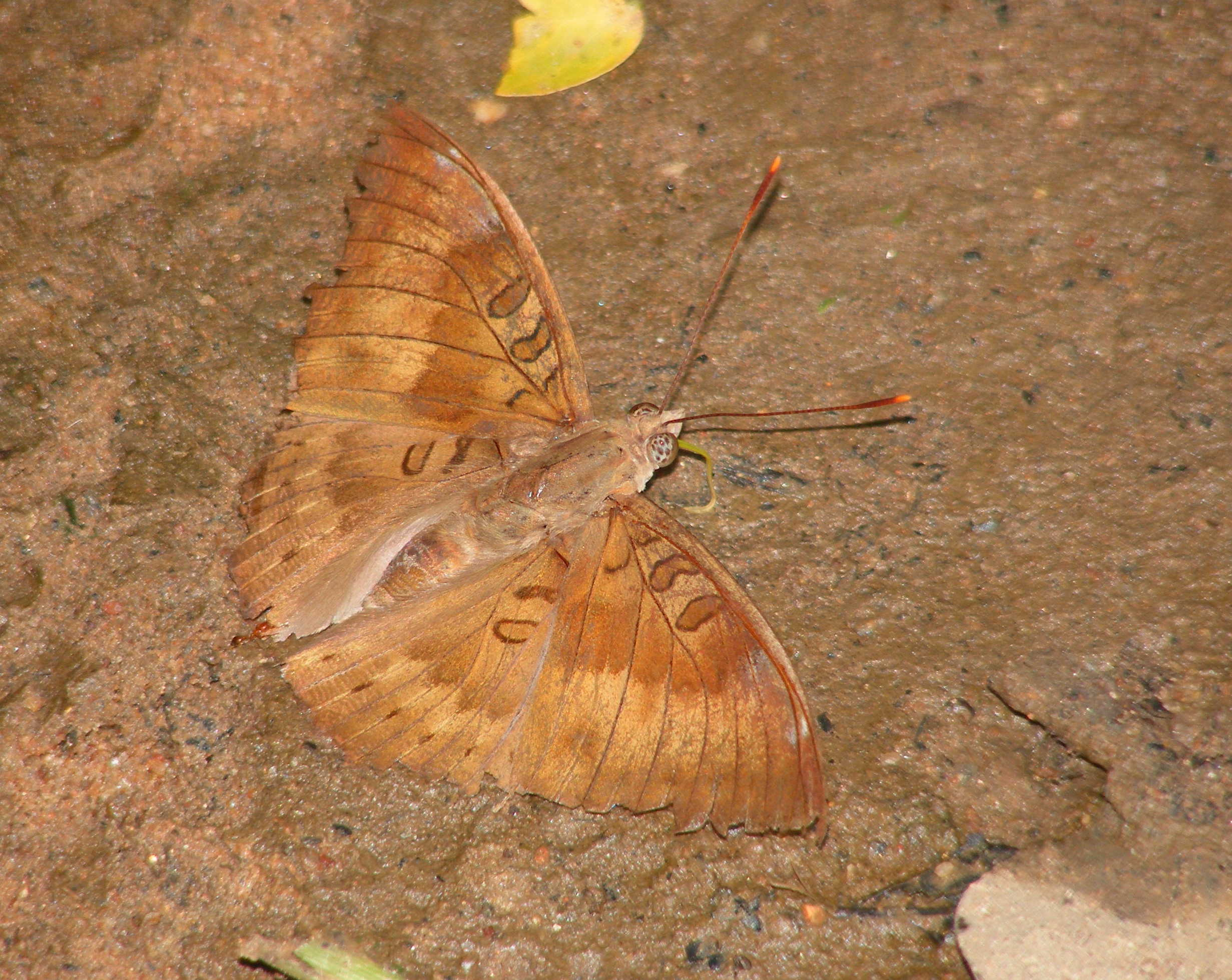
Male

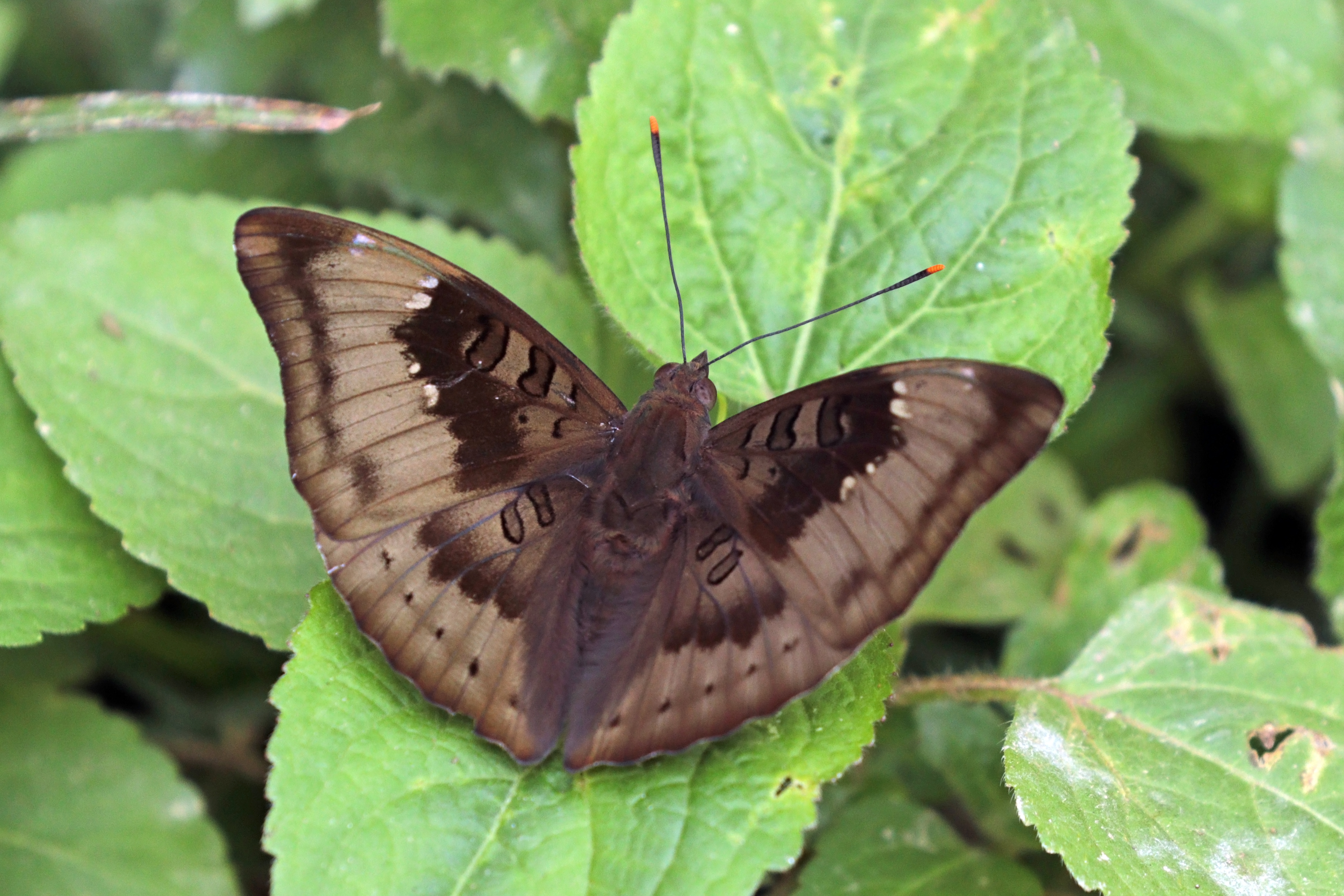
Male E. a. suddhodana
Bardiya, Nepal

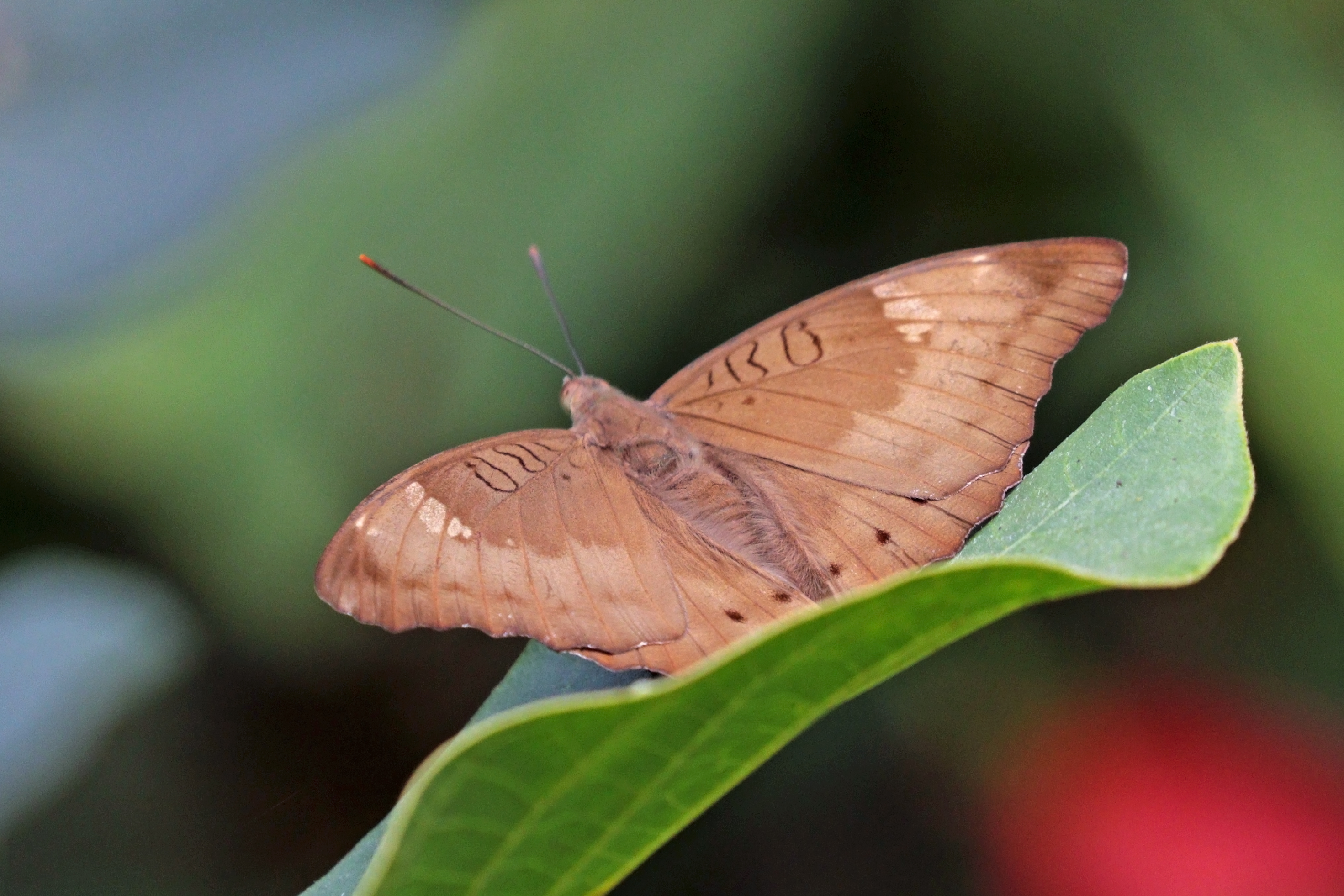
Female E. a. suddhodana
Chitwan, Nepal

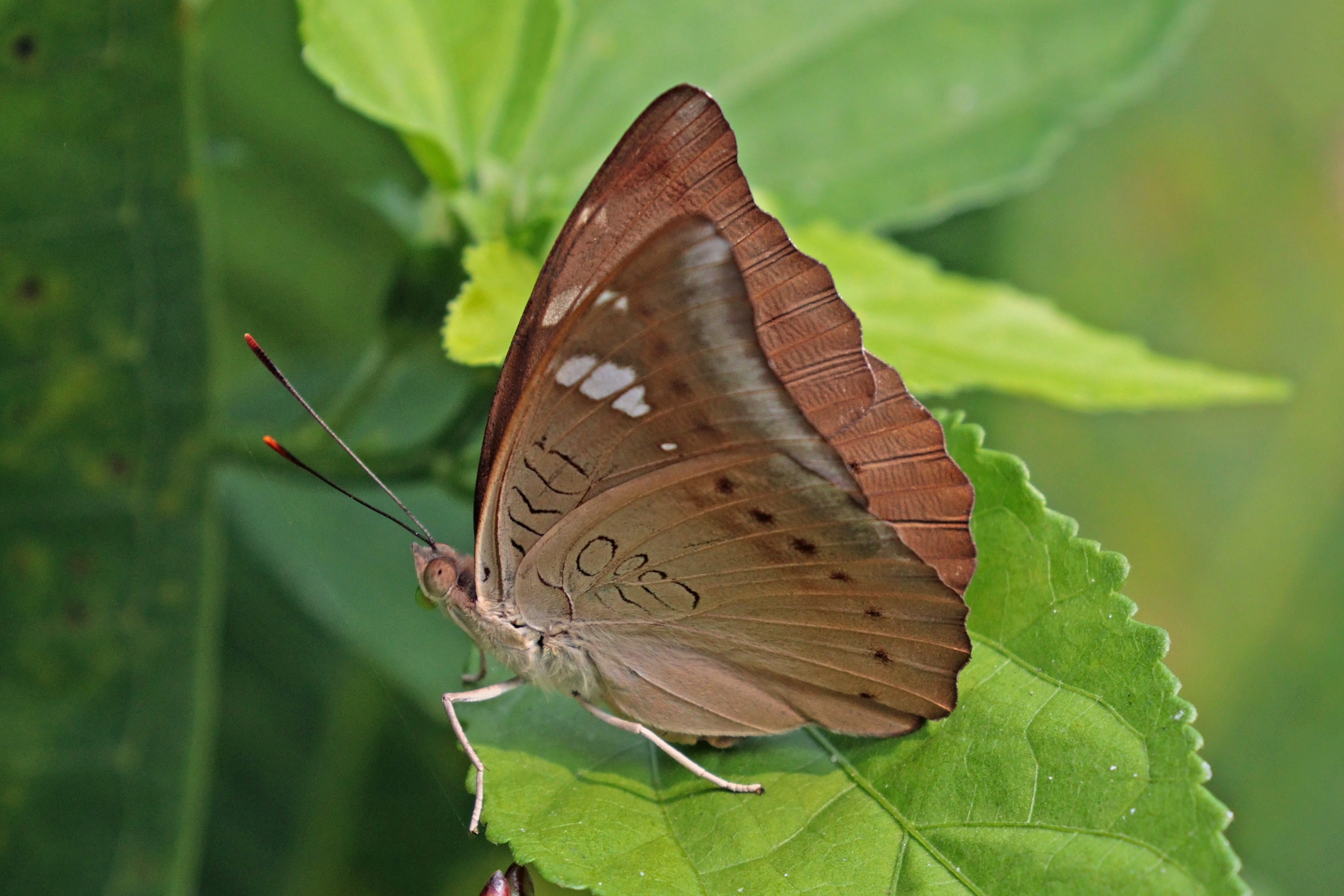
Female E. a. suddhodana
Chitwan, Nepal

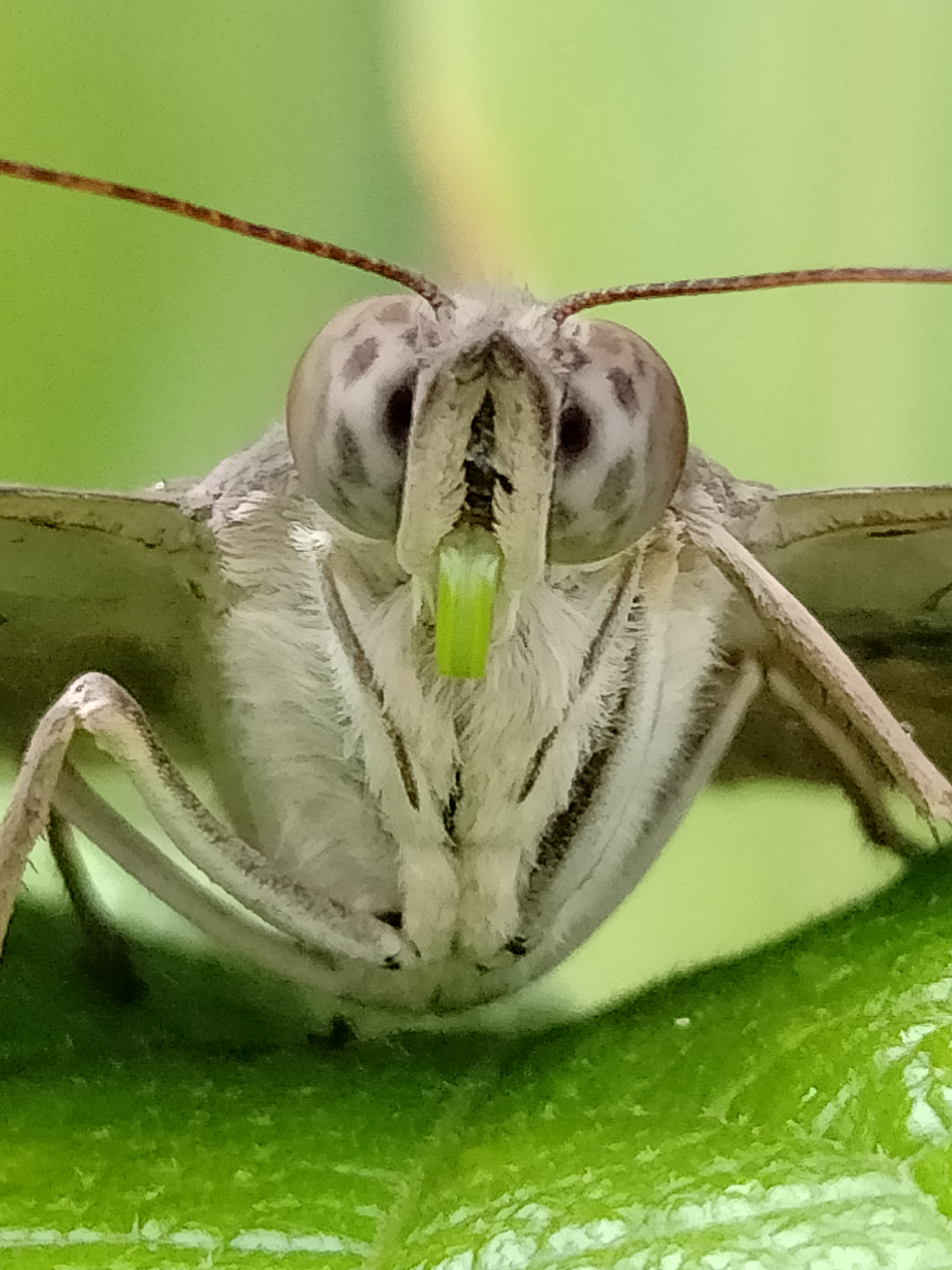

== Habits ==
This butterfly has a stiff flap glide style of flying. It flies at low heights and maintains a territory.

== Range ==
In 1905, Charles Thomas Bingham recorded it to be found throughout peninsular India, except in the desert tracts, and the higher ranges of the Himalayas; Assam; Burma; Tenasserim, extending to the peninsula, and Sumatra.

== Life history ==
The pupa is green and quadrangular and found especially on mango where it is sometimes treated as a minor pest.

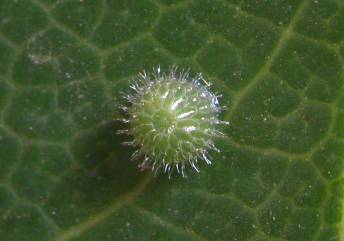
Egg

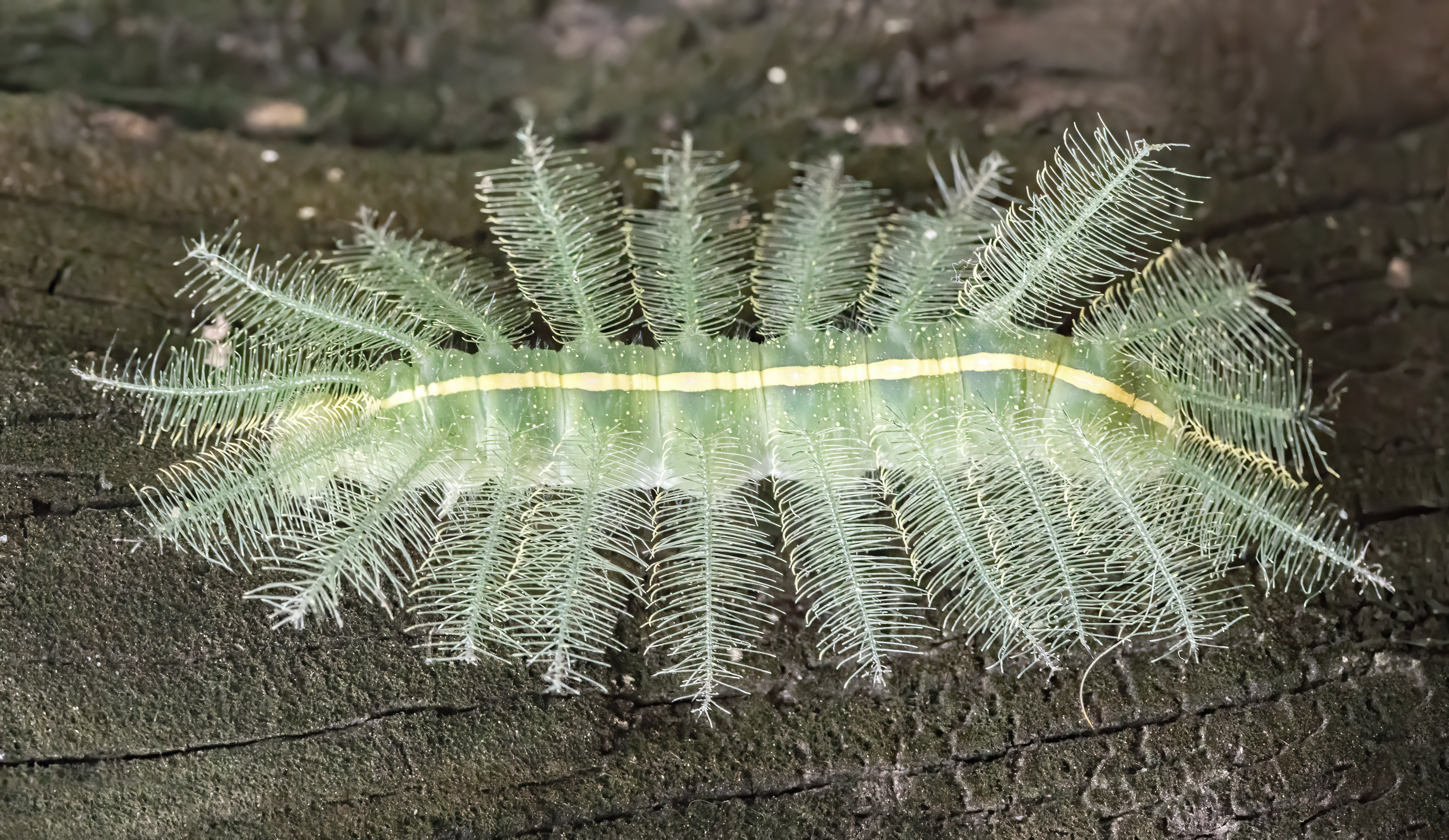
Euthalia aconthea caterpillar

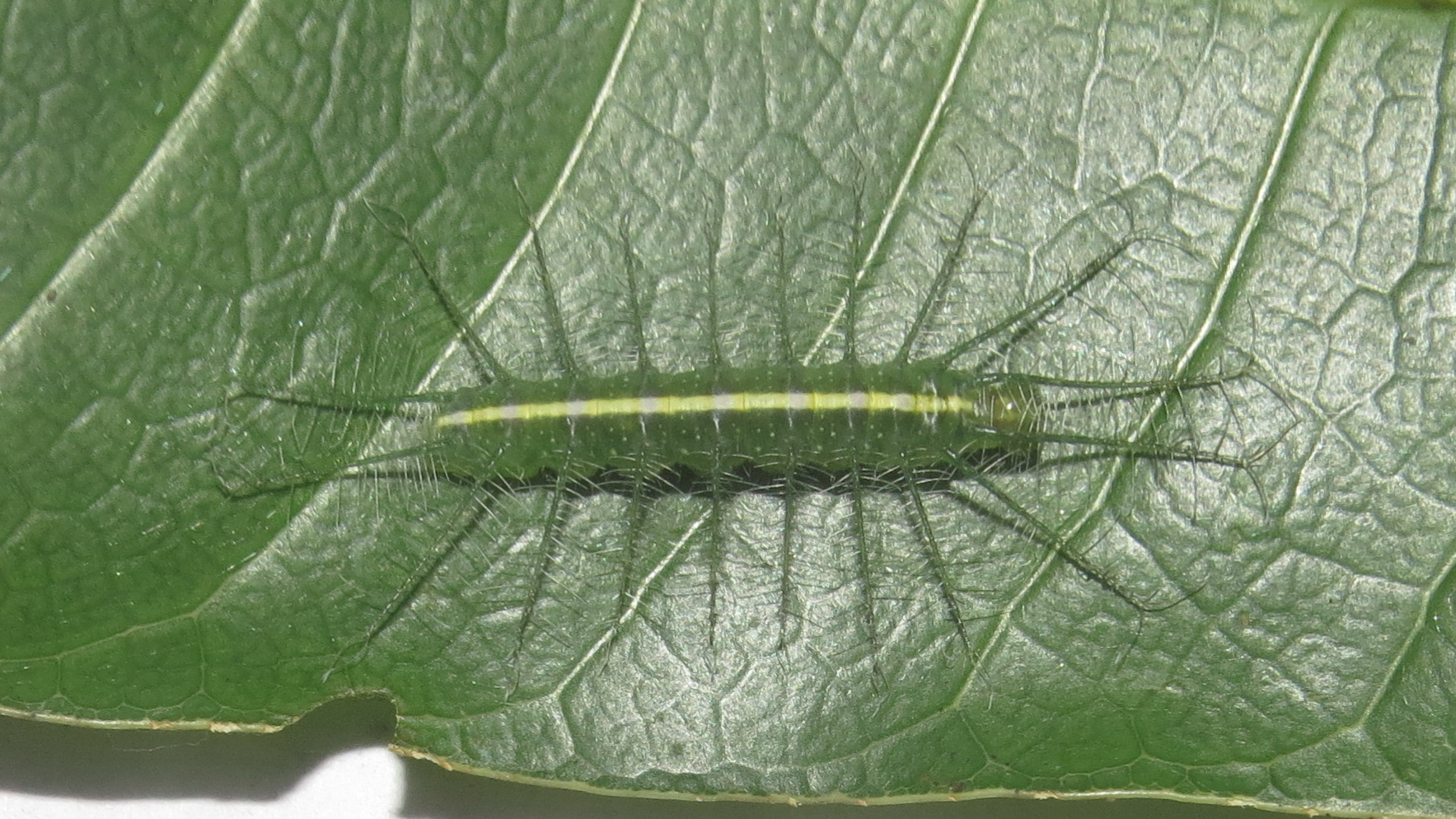
Larva

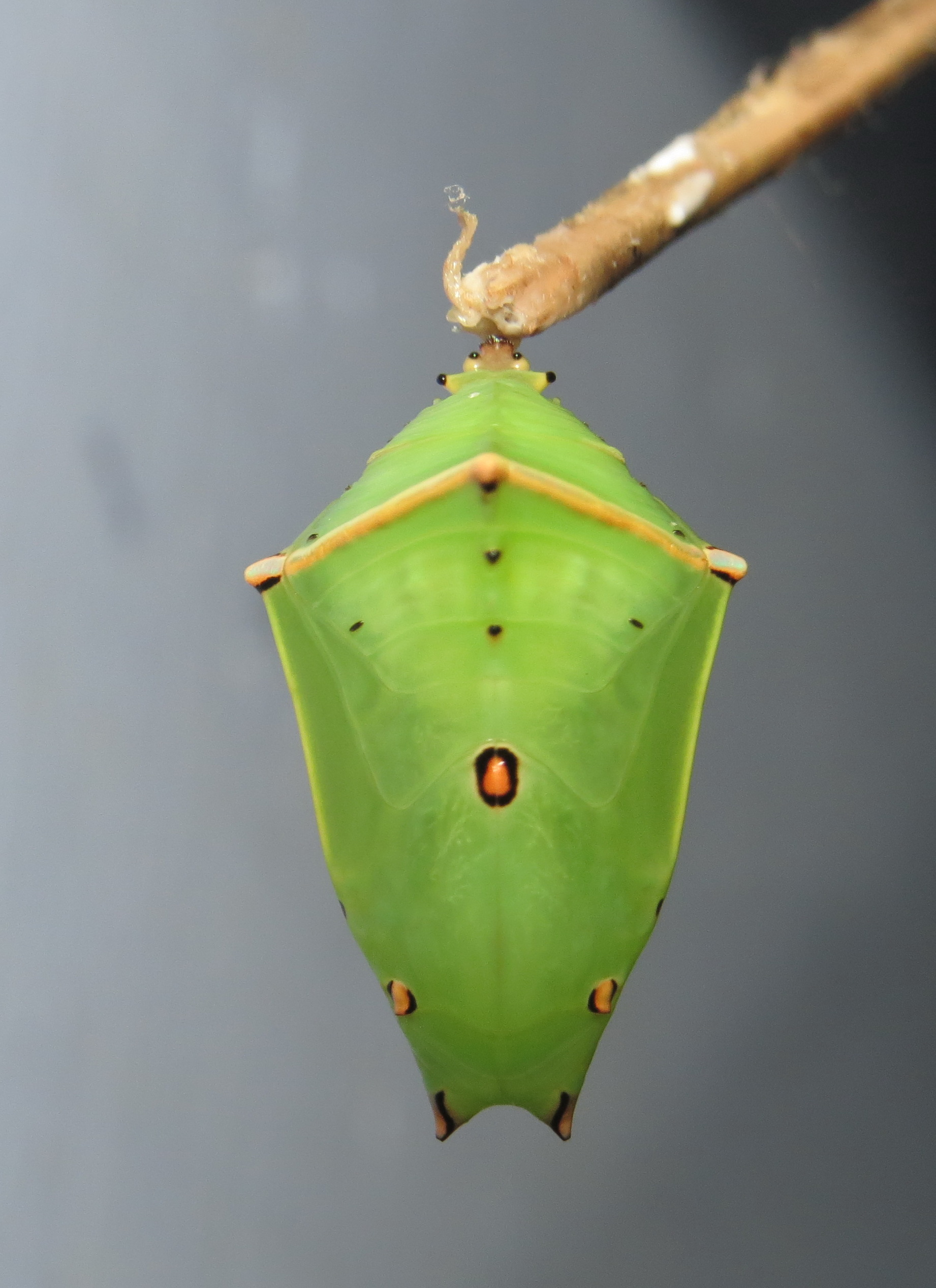
Chrysalis

=== Larval food plants ===
Larvae feed on Anacardium occidentale, Scurrula, mango (Mangifera indica).
