= National Register of Historic Places listings in Wilson County, North Carolina =

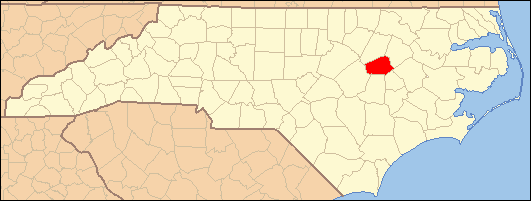

This list includes properties and districts listed on the National Register of Historic Places in Wilson County, North Carolina. Click the "Map of all coordinates" link to the powerful to view a Google map of all properties and districts with latitude and longitude coordinates in the table below.

This National Park Service list is complete through NPS recent listings posted July 11, 2025.

== Current listings ==
	Name on the Register	Image	Date listed	Location	City or town	Description
1	W. H. Applewhite House		February 13, 1986 (#86000696)	Off NC 58; 35°37′25″N 77°49′18″W	Stantonsburg	
2	Manalcus Aycock House		February 13, 1986 (#86000765)	Center St. 35°38′05″N 77°56′02″W	Black Creek	
3	Gen. Joshua Barnes House		February 13, 1986 (#86000764)	W side of SR 1326 at SR 1327; 35°45′44″N 77°54′09″W	Wilson	
4	Black Creek Rural Historic District		October 14, 1986 (#86001659)	Along NC 1628; 35°37′36″N 77°53′22″W	Black Creek	
5	Branch Banking	Branch Banking	August 11, 1978 (#78001986)	124 E. Nash St. 35°43′30″N 77°54′38″W	Wilson	
6	Broad-Kenan Streets Historic District	Broad-Kenan Streets Historic District	October 27, 1988 (#88002084)	Roughly bounded by Pine, Broad, Hines, and Cone; 35°43′44″N 77°55′04″W	Wilson	
7	Bullock-Dew House		February 13, 1986 (#86000759)	NC 581; 35°44′22″N 78°06′43″W	Sims	
8	Cherry Hotel	Cherry Hotel	August 26, 1982 (#82003531)	333 E. Nash St. 35°43′24″N 77°54′30″W	Wilson	
9	Davis-Whitehead-Harriss House	Davis-Whitehead-Harriss House	June 14, 1982 (#82003532)	600 W. Nash St. 35°43′57″N 77°54′57″W	Wilson	
10	East Wilson Historic District	East Wilson Historic District	April 11, 1988 (#88000371)	Roughly bounded by E. Gold and Academy Sts., Ward Blvd., Woodard Street Ave. and Elvie St., and Railroad and Pender Sts. 35°43′10″N 77°54′10″W	Wilson	
11	Edmondson-Woodward House		February 13, 1986 (#86000767)	NC 58 and SR 1542; 35°39′08″N 77°49′57″W	Stantonsburg	
12	Elm City Municipal Historic District		February 13, 1986 (#86000770)	Roughly bounded by North, Pender and Branch, Wilson, and Anderson Sts. 35°48′28″N 77°51′45″W	Elm City	
13	W. H. Langley House	W. H. Langley House	February 13, 1986 (#86000763)	N side of SR 1003; 35°48′31″N 77°52′45″W	Elm City	
14	Lucama Municipal Historic District		February 13, 1986 (#86000772)	Roughly bounded by US 301 and Railroad St., Main St., Black Creek Rd., and Goldsboro St. 35°38′35″N 78°00′38″W	Lucama	
15	Dr. H. D. Lucas House		February 13, 1986 (#86000771)	Center St. 35°38′12″N 77°56′04″W	Black Creek	Demolished
16	Old Wilson Historic District	Old Wilson Historic District	December 20, 1984 (#84000736)	Roughly bounded by Nash, N. Cone, Gold and Railroad Sts. and Maplewood Cemetery; 35°43′51″N 77°54′38″W	Wilson	
17	Joseph John Pender House		February 13, 1986 (#86000766)	SR 1418 and SR 1002; 35°46′17″N 77°46′28″W	Wilson	
18	Moses Rountree House	Moses Rountree House	April 26, 1982 (#82003533)	107 N. Rountree St. 35°44′03″N 77°54′59″W	Wilson	
19	Maj. James Scarborough House		June 14, 1982 (#82003530)	NC 222; 35°39′46″N 77°46′03″W	Saratoga	
20	Alfred and Martha Jane Thompson House and Williams Barn		February 14, 2002 (#02000007)	NC 1314, 0.4 miles W of NC 58; 35°48′36″N 77°57′18″W	New Hope	
21	Upper Town Creek Rural Historic District		August 29, 1986 (#86001656)	Roughly bounded by NC 1003, NC 1411, NC 1414, and Town Creek; 35°47′57″N 77°45′25″W	Wilson	
22	Ward-Applewhite-Thompson House		February 13, 1986 (#86000695)	S side of SR 1539; 35°36′16″N 77°47′47″W	Stantonsburg	
23	Webb-Barron-Wells House		February 13, 1986 (#86000769)	E side SR 1512; 35°45′37″N 77°44′08″W	Elm City	
24	West Nash Street Historic District	West Nash Street Historic District	December 20, 1984 (#84001033)	West Nash St. 35°44′18″N 77°55′14″W	Wilson	
25	Olzie Whitehead Williams House	Olzie Whitehead Williams House	December 19, 1983 (#83004004)	SR 1332; 35°47′22″N 77°55′08″W	Wilson	
26	Wilson Central Business-Tobacco Warehouse Historic District	Wilson Central Business-Tobacco Warehouse Historic District	December 20, 1984 (#84003876)	Roughly bounded by Pender, Green, Pine, S. Jackson, and Hines Sts. 35°43′26″N 77°54′41″W	Wilson	
27	Wilson County Courthouse	Wilson County Courthouse	May 10, 1979 (#79001765)	Nash at Goldsboro St. 35°43′32″N 77°54′37″W	Wilson	
28	Woodard Family Rural Historic District		August 29, 1986 (#86001657)	Along US 264; 35°41′30″N 77°50′18″W	Wilson	

== See also ==
- National Register of Historic Places listings in North Carolina
- List of National Historic Landmarks in North Carolina
