= Wilson County Courthouse =

Wilson County Courthouse may refer to:

- Wilson County Courthouse (Kansas), Fredonia, Kansas
- Wilson County Courthouse (North Carolina), Wilson, North Carolina
- Wilson County Courthouse and Jail, Floresville, Texas
