= Solon B. Moore =

American architect

Solon Balias Moore (May 17, 1872 – January 16, 1930) was an American architect whose work was concentrated in Wilson, North Carolina.

He worked with architect Charles C. Benton, Sr. during 1910–1915. He practiced on his own for 16 years following that.

At least two of his works are listed on the U.S. National Register of Historic Places.

Works include:

- One or more works in Old Wilson Historic District, roughly bounded by Nash, N. Cone, Gold and Railroad Sts. and Maplewood Cemetery, Wilson, North Carolina (Moore, Solon Balias), NRHP-listed
- One or more works in West Nash Street Historic District, West Nash St. Wilson, North Carolina (Moore, Solon Balias), NRHP-listed
- Fidelity Mutual Life Building, in Gothic Revival architecture (with Charles C. Benton, Sr.)
- St. John's African Methodist Episcopal Zion Church (with Charles C. Benton, Sr.)
- Elizabeth City Hospital (with Charles C. Benton, Sr.)
- Rainey Hospital in Burlington, North Carolina (with Charles C. Benton, Sr.)
- Selby Anderson House, a brick bungalow house
