= Wilson Medical Center =

Wilson Medical Center may refer to:

- UHS Wilson Medical Center in Greater Binghamton, New York, a part of United Health Services
- Wilson Medical Center (North Carolina)
