= Joseph John Pender House =

Historic house in North Carolina, United States

- U.S. National Register of Historic Places
- Location within North Carolina Location within the United States
- Location: SR 1418 and SR 1002, near Wilson, North Carolina
- Coordinates: 35°46′17″N 77°46′28″W
- Area: 12 acres (4.9 ha)
- Built: c. 1840
- Architectural style: Federal
- MPS: Wilson MRA
- NRHP reference No.: 86000766
- Added to NRHP: February 13, 1986

Joseph John Pender House is a historic plantation house located near Wilson, Wilson County, North Carolina. The original section of the house was built about 1840 by Joseph John Pender, a large landowner and successful planter who was a member of a prominent landholding family. The house consists of a two-story, three bay, Federal frame section and a one-story frame kitchen/dining room ell. Also on the property are the contributing frame well structure and two tobacco barns.

It was listed on the National Register of Historic Places in 1986.
