= Broad–Kenan Streets Historic District =

Historic district in North Carolina, United States

- U.S. National Register of Historic Places
- U.S. Historic district
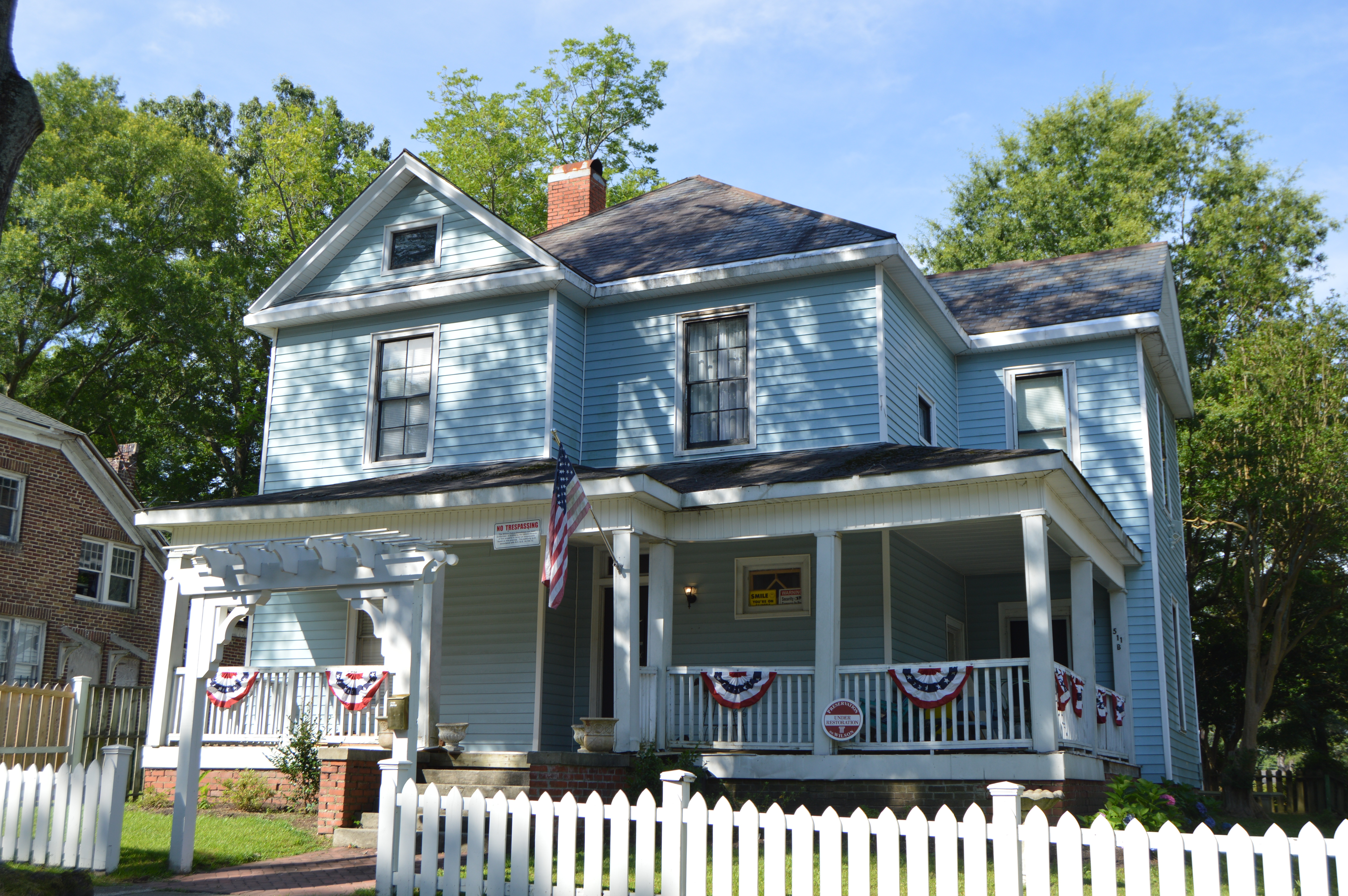
- House at Daniel and Kenan Streets

- Location within North Carolina Location within the United States
- Location: Roughly bounded by Pine, Broad, Hines and Cone, Wilson, North Carolina
- Coordinates: 35°43′44″N 77°55′04″W
- Area: 122 acres (49 ha)
- Built: 1890
- Architect: S.B. Moore, et al.
- Architectural style: Colonial Revival, Bungalow/craftsman, Queen Anne
- NRHP reference No.: 88002084
- Added to NRHP: October 27, 1988

Broad–Kenan Streets Historic District is a national historic district located at Wilson, Wilson County, North Carolina. It encompasses 293 contributing buildings in a predominantly residential section of Wilson. The district developed between about 1890 to 1940 and includes notable examples of Colonial Revival, Bungalow / American Craftsman, and Queen Anne style architecture. Notable buildings include the Woman's Club of Wilson (1922).

It was listed on the National Register of Historic Places in 1988.
