= Olzie Whitehead Williams House =

Historic house in North Carolina, United States

- U.S. National Register of Historic Places
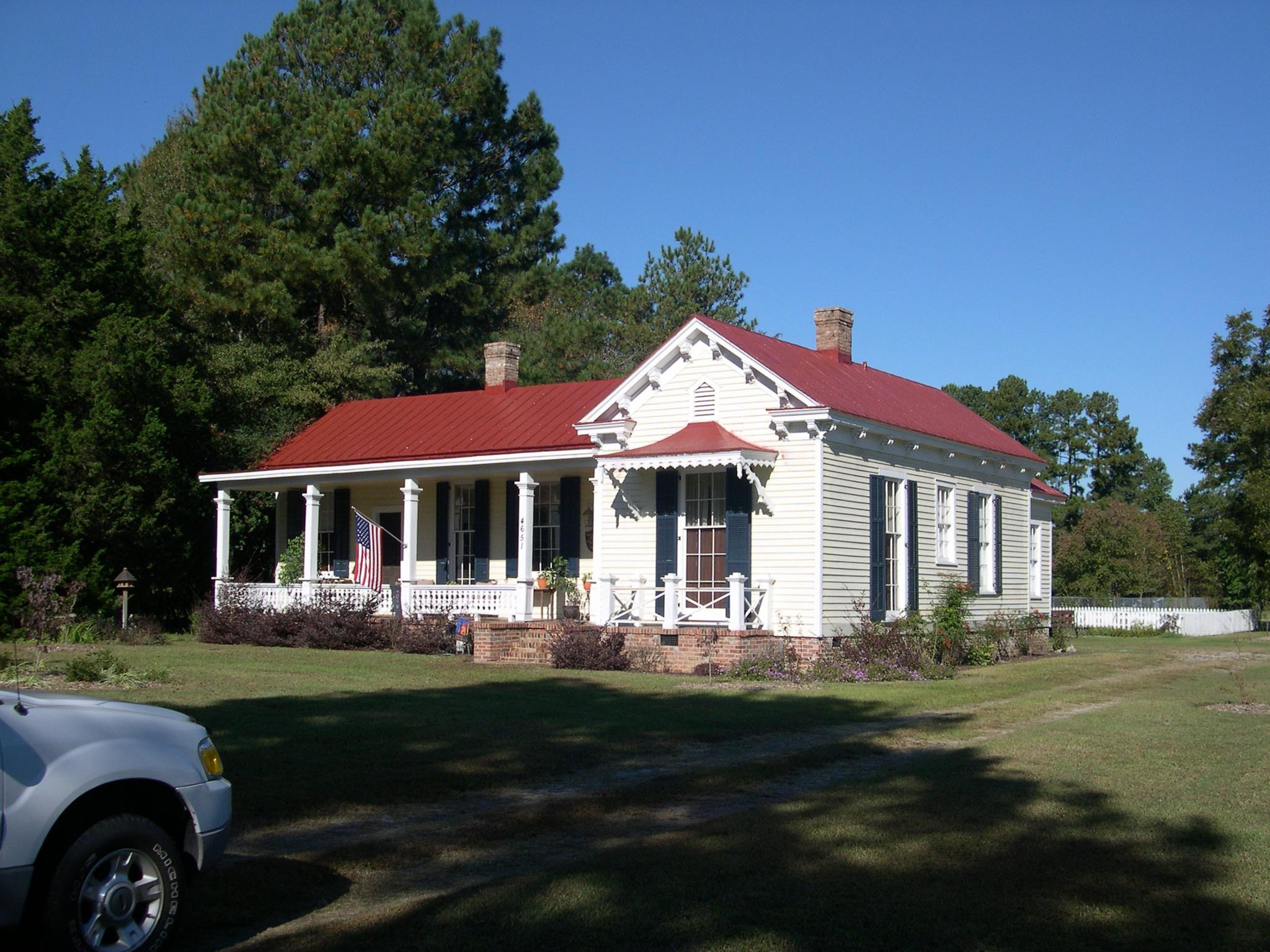

- Location within North Carolina Location within the United States
- Location: SR 1332, near Wilson, North Carolina
- Coordinates: 35°47′22″N 77°55′8″W
- Area: less than one acre
- Built: c. 1860
- Architectural style: Italianate
- NRHP reference No.: 83004004
- Added to NRHP: December 19, 1983

Olzie Whitehead Williams House is a historic home located near Wilson, Wilson County, North Carolina. It was built about 1860, and is a single-story, six-bay, L-shaped, Italianate style frame house with a gabled projecting end pavilion. It rests on a low brick pier foundation and is sheathed in weatherboard. The front facade features a shed roofed verandah.

It was listed on the National Register of Historic Places in 1983.
