= Old Wilson Historic District =

Historic district in North Carolina, United States

- U.S. National Register of Historic Places
- U.S. Historic district
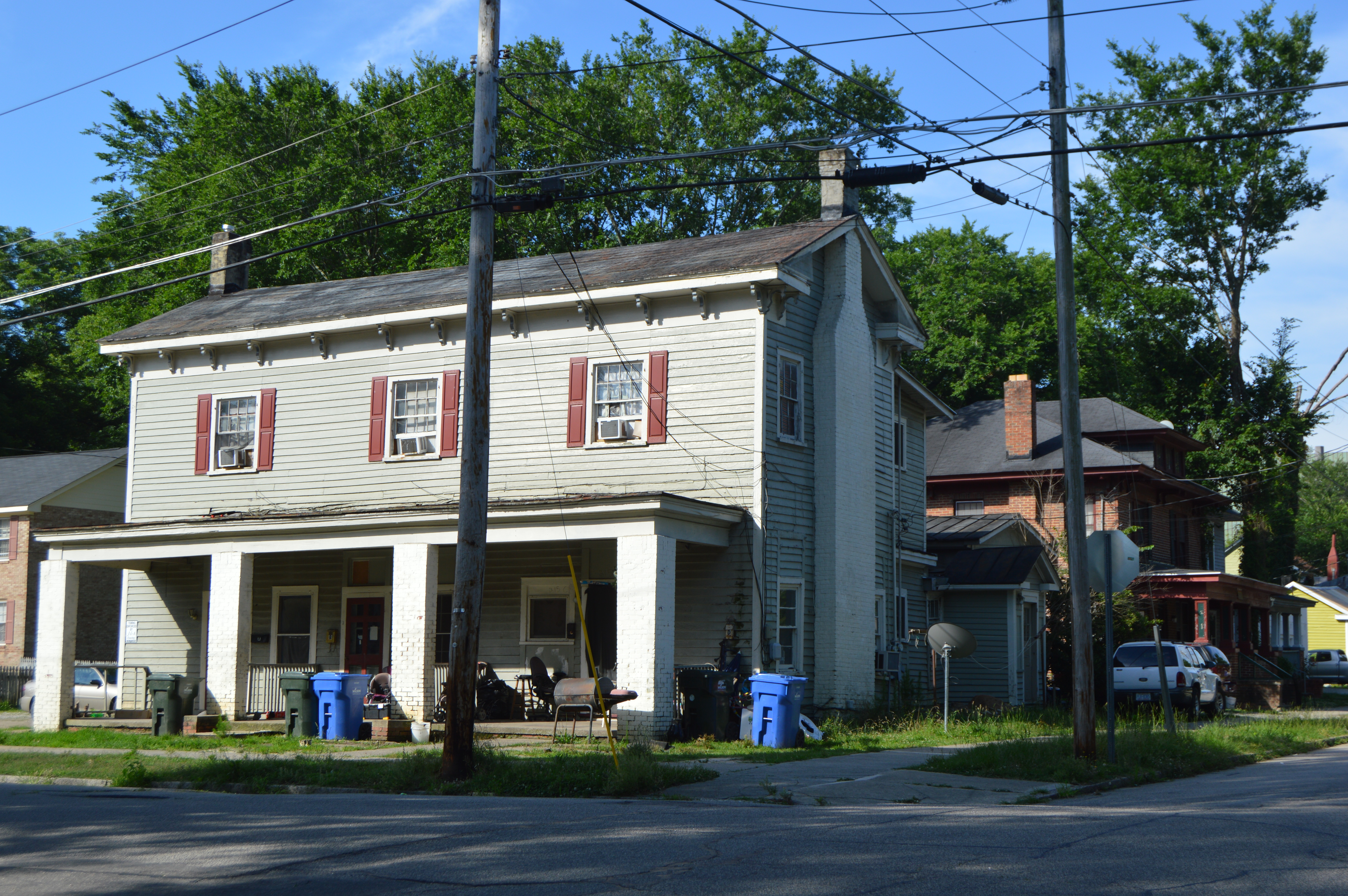
- Maplewood Avenue at Vance Street

- Location within North Carolina Location within the United States
- Location: Roughly bounded by Nash, N. Cone, Gold and Railroad Sts. and Maplewood Cemetery, Wilson, North Carolina
- Coordinates: 35°43′51″N 77°54′38″W
- Area: 164 acres (66 ha)
- Built: 1853
- Architect: Solon Balias Moore, et al.
- Architectural style: Colonial Revival, Bungalow/craftsman, Queen Anne
- NRHP reference No.: 84000736
- Added to NRHP: December 20, 1984

The Old Wilson Historic District in Wilson, North Carolina is a 164-acre (66 ha) historic district that was listed on the National Register of Historic Places (NRHP) in 1984. It includes work dating from 1853 and work designed by architect Solon Balias Moore and others. The listing included 263 contributing buildings, one contributing site, one contributing structure, and three contributing objects.

It includes the separately NRHP-listed Moses Rountree House and the NRHP-listed Davis-Whitehead-Harriss House.
