= Maj. James Scarborough House =

Historic house in North Carolina, United States

- U.S. National Register of Historic Places
- Location within North Carolina Location within the United States
- Location: NC 222, near Saratoga, North Carolina
- Coordinates: 35°39′46″N 77°46′03″W
- Area: 10.5 acres (4.2 ha)
- Built: 1821
- Architectural style: Federal
- NRHP reference No.: 82003530
- Added to NRHP: June 14, 1982

Maj. James Scarborough House is a historic plantation house located near Saratoga, Wilson County, North Carolina. It was built about 1821, and is a two-story, five-bay, Federal style frame dwelling with a rear shed addition and exterior end chimneys. It has a one-story rear kitchen wing connected by a breezeway. Also on the property is a contributing latticed well-house.

It was listed on the National Register of Historic Places in 1982.
