= Manalcus Aycock House =

Historic house in North Carolina, United States

- U.S. National Register of Historic Places
- Location within North Carolina Location within the United States
- Location: Center St., Black Creek, North Carolina
- Coordinates: 35°38′5″N 77°56′2″W
- Area: less than one acre
- Built: 1900
- Built by: Aycock, Manalcus; Rackley, Claudius C.
- MPS: Wilson MRA
- NRHP reference No.: 86000765
- Added to NRHP: February 13, 1986

Manalcus Aycock House is a historic home located at Black Creek, Wilson County, North Carolina. It was built in 1900, and is a large two-story, six-bay, rambling frame dwelling. It consists of a hipped-roof section with two-story cross-gable wings. It features a large front porch with half-timbering and sawnwork decoration and stained glass windows. Also on the property is a contributing hipped-roof garage.

It was listed on the National Register of Historic Places in 1986.
