= Upper Town Creek Rural Historic District =

Historic district in North Carolina, United States

- U.S. National Register of Historic Places
- U.S. Historic district
- Location within North Carolina Location within the United States
- Nearest city: Roughly bounded by NC 1003, NC 1411, NC 1414, and Town Creek, near Wilson, North Carolina
- Coordinates: 35°47′57″N 77°45′25″W
- Area: 1,755.7 acres (710.5 ha)
- Built: 1820
- Architectural style: Greek Revival, Gothic Revival, Federal
- MPS: Wilson MRA
- NRHP reference No.: 86001656
- Added to NRHP: August 29, 1986

Upper Town Creek Rural Historic District is a national historic district located near Wilson, in Edgecombe and Wilson County, North Carolina. The district encompasses 117 contributing buildings and 2 contributing structures on four contiguous farms near Wilson. The main plantation house on each farm are the Federal-style W. D. Petway House (c. 1820); the Greek Revival house built for Colonel David Williams (c. 1845-1860); the house built for Cally S. Braswell ("Hawthorne"; c. 1855); and the board and batten Gothic Revival Jesse Norris House (c. 1845-1860). The remaining contributing building and structures include packhouses, tobacco barns, tenant houses, and other agricultural outbuildings.

It was listed on the National Register of Historic Places in 1986.
