= Sims, North Carolina =

- Town
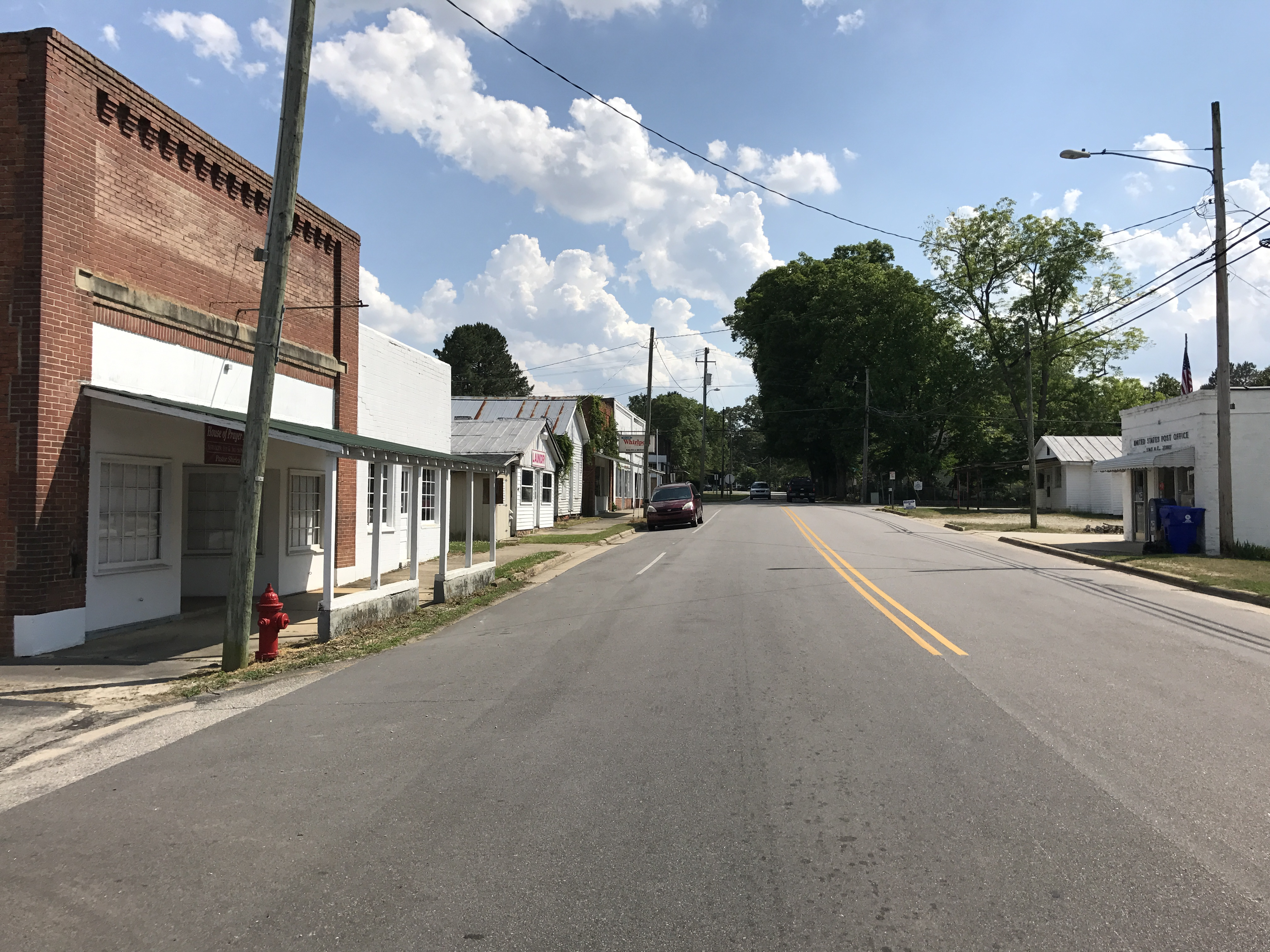

- Location within the state of North Carolina
- Coordinates: 35°45′33″N 78°03′37″W
- Country: United States
- State: North Carolina
- County: Wilson

Area
  - Total: 0.22 sq mi (0.57 km^{2})
  - Land: 0.22 sq mi (0.57 km^{2})
  - Water: 0 sq mi (0.00 km^{2})
- Elevation: 207 ft (63 m)

Population (2020)
  - Total: 275
  - Density: 1,252.6/sq mi (483.62/km^{2})
- Time zone: UTC-5 (Eastern (EST))
  - Summer (DST): UTC-4 (EDT)
- ZIP code: 27880
- Area code: 252
- FIPS code: 37-62060
- GNIS feature ID: 2407345
- Website: https://www.townofsimsnc.com/

Sims is a town in Wilson County, North Carolina, United States. The population was 275 at the 2020 census.

== History ==
The Bullock-Dew House was listed on the National Register of Historic Places in 1986.

== Geography ==
According to the United States Census Bureau, the town has a total area of 0.1 square miles (0.26 km^{2}), all land.

== Demographics ==
Historical population
Census	Pop.	Note	%±
1930	122		—
1940	173		41.8%
1950	207		19.7%
1960	205		−1.0%
1970	205		0.0%
1980	192		−6.3%
1990	124		−35.4%
2000	128		3.2%
2010	282		120.3%
2020	275		−2.5%
U.S. Decennial Census

According to 2010 census data, there were 282 people, 113 households, and 85 families residing in the town.

As of the census of 2000, the population density was 1,016.4 inhabitants per square mile (392.4/km^{2}). There were 72 housing units at an average density of 571.7 per square mile (220.7/km^{2}). The racial makeup of the town was 75.00% White, 22.66% African American, 2.34% from other races. Hispanic or Latino of any race were 2.34% of the population.

There were 61 households, out of which 21.3% had children under the age of 18 living with them, 45.9% were married couples living together, 9.8% had a female householder with no husband present, and 36.1% were non-families. 32.8% of all households were made up of individuals, and 9.8% had someone living alone who was 65 years of age or older. The average household size was 2.10 and the average family size was 2.54.

In the town, the population was spread out, with 18.0% under the age of 18, 3.9% from 18 to 24, 25.0% from 25 to 44, 35.2% from 45 to 64, and 18.0% who were 65 years of age or older. The median age was 46 years. For every 100 females, there were 96.9 males. For every 100 females age 18 and over, there were 90.9 males.

The median income for a household in the town was $26,250, and the median income for a family was $29,583. Males had a median income of $24,375 versus $21,250 for females. The per capita income for the town was $20,962. None of the population and none of the families were below the poverty line.

== Population boom ==
The town of Sims has recently undergone a population boom due to being located with direct access to highways U.S. 264 and I-95. Sims is located in proximity to Wilson, Raleigh, Greenville, and Goldsboro. Recently, Wilson County's first gated community constructed its first phase in the area of Sims. A new shopping center is in the planning stages as well. New subdivisions include Buckhorn 100 homes, Magnolia Place 58 homes, Williams Point 19, Stotts Crossing, The Summit, Eagle Harbor, and Crystal Lake Commons (1st gated community 28 homes ranging $350,000 to $750,000).
