= Lucama Municipal Historic District =

Historic district in North Carolina, United States

- U.S. National Register of Historic Places
- U.S. Historic district
- Location within North Carolina Location within the United States
- Location: Roughly bounded by US 301 and Railroad St., Main St., Black Creek Rd., and Goldsboro St., Lucama, North Carolina
- Coordinates: 35°38′35″N 78°00′38″W
- Area: 30 acres (12 ha)
- Built: 1889
- Architectural style: Classical Revival, Bungalow/craftsman, Victorian Cottage
- MPS: Wilson MRA
- NRHP reference No.: 86000772
- Added to NRHP: February 13, 1986

Lucama Municipal Historic District is a national historic district located at Lucama, Wilson County, North Carolina. It encompasses 42 contributing buildings in the railroad town of Lucama. The district developed between about 1890 to 1930 and includes notable examples of Classical Revival, Bungalow / American Craftsman, and Victorian style architecture. Notable buildings include the Will Davis Store (c. 1890), Jesse Lucas Store (c. 1890), Lucama Depot (1905), Kinchen Barnes Store (c. 1900), W. J. Newsome Store (c. 1900), Lousetta Newsome House (1887), Dr. Ben Hackney House, and Lucama Methodist Church (1915).

It was listed on the National Register of Historic Places in 1986.
