= Wilson Central Business–Tobacco Warehouse Historic District =

Historic district in North Carolina, United States

- U.S. National Register of Historic Places
- U.S. Historic district
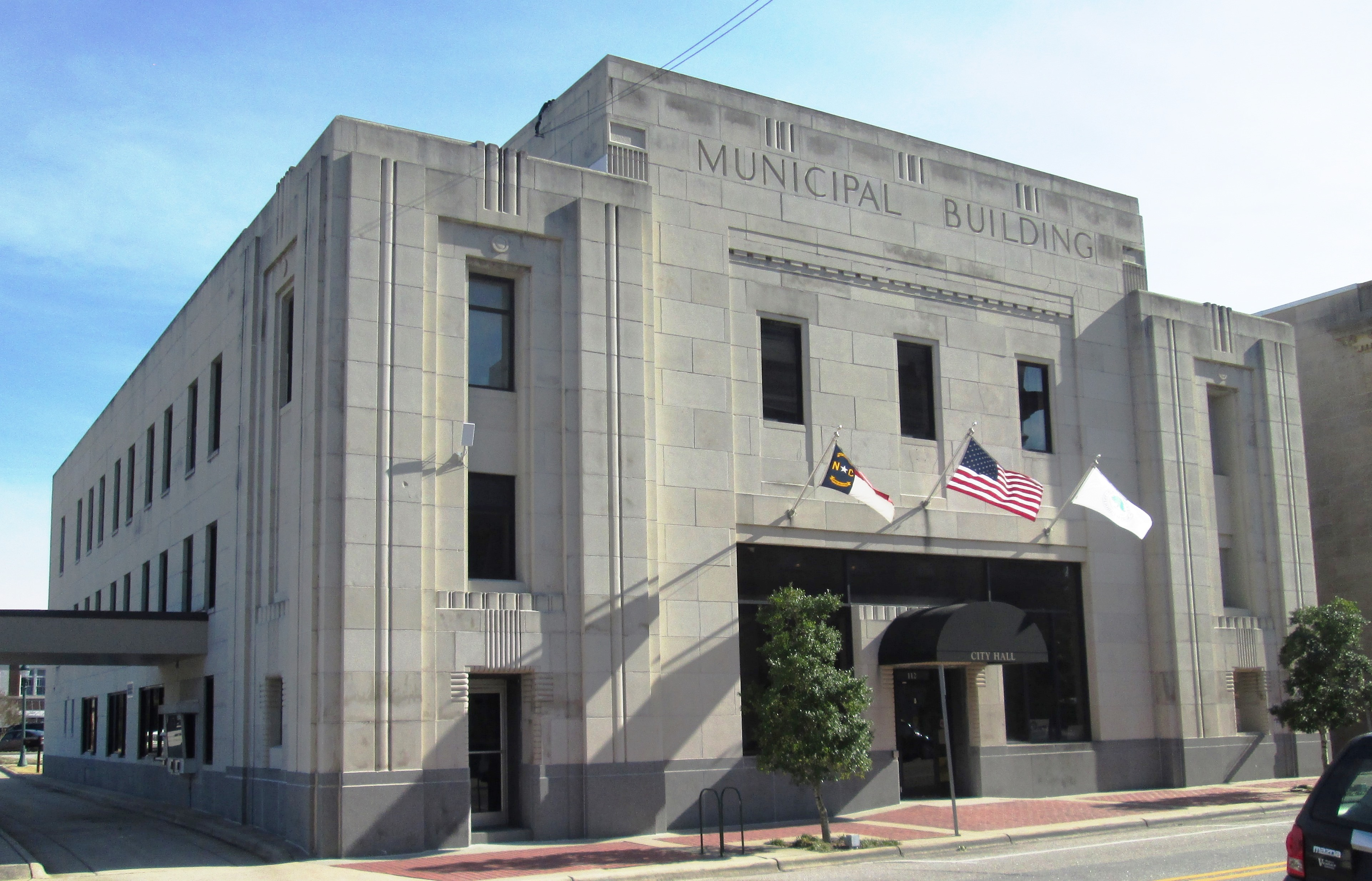
- Wilson Municipal Building (1938) in 2019

- Location within North Carolina
- Location: Roughly bounded by Pender, Green, Pine, S. Jackson, and Hines Sts., Wilson, North Carolina
- Coordinates: 35°43′26″N 77°55′41″W
- Area: 141 acres (57 ha)
- Architect: Multiple
- Architectural style: Late 19th And 20th Century Revivals, Late Victorian, Art Deco
- NRHP reference No.: 84003876
- Added to NRHP: December 20, 1984

The Wilson Central Business–Tobacco Warehouse District is a national historic district located at Wilson, Wilson County, North Carolina. It encompasses 152 contributing buildings, 20 contributing sites, and 2 contributing structures in the central business district of Wilson. The district includes notable examples of Late Victorian and Art Deco style architecture. Located in the district are the separately listed Branch Banking Building, Cherry Hotel, and Wilson County Courthouse. Other notable buildings include the Woodard-Watson Warehouse, Planter's Warehouse, Passenger Station and Freight Depot (1924), Jackson Chapel First Baptist Church (1913), St. John's African Methodist Episcopal Church (1915), Imperial Tobacco Company (c. 1903, c. 1910, 1919), Winstead-Hardy Building (c. 1866), Rountree Building (1870s), Planter's Bank Building (1920), United States Post Office and Courthouse (1927), Charles L. Coon High School (1922), First National Bank of Wilson Building (1927), Wilson Theatre (1922), Odd Fellows Lodge (1896), and the Works Projects Administration financed Wilson Municipal Building (1938).

It was listed on the National Register of Historic Places in 1984.
