= Gen. Joshua Barnes House =

Historic house in North Carolina, United States

- U.S. National Register of Historic Places
- Location within North Carolina Location within the United States
- Location: W side of SR 1326 at SR 1327, near Wilson, North Carolina
- Coordinates: 35°45′44″N 77°54′9″W
- Area: 3.9 acres (1.6 ha)
- Built: c. 1830, c. 1844, c. 1870
- Architectural style: Greek Revival, Central Hall Plan
- MPS: Wilson MRA
- NRHP reference No.: 86000764
- Added to NRHP: February 13, 1986

Gen. Joshua Barnes House is a historic house located along SR 1326 near Wilson, Wilson County, North Carolina.

== Description and history ==
It was built about 1844, and is a two-story, central-hall-plan, Greek Revival style frame dwelling. It was built around the nucleus of an earlier, Federal style dwelling built about 1830 and remodeled about 1870. It has a shallow hipped roof and one-story, full-width front porch. Attached to the rear of the house is a small one-story Greek Revival frame structure connected by an enclosed breezeway. It was built by Gen. Joshua Barnes, who is considered the father of Wilson County.

It was listed on the National Register of Historic Places on February 13, 1986.
