= Bullock-Dew House =

Historic house in North Carolina, United States

- U.S. National Register of Historic Places
- Location within North Carolina Location within the United States
- Location: NC 581, near Sims, North Carolina
- Coordinates: 35°44′22″N 78°06′43″W
- Area: 31.7 acres (12.8 ha)
- Built: 1902
- Architectural style: Queen Anne
- MPS: Wilson MRA
- NRHP reference No.: 86000759
- Added to NRHP: February 13, 1986

Bullock-Dew House is a historic home located near Sims, Wilson County, North Carolina. It was built about 1902, and is a two-story, five-bay, asymmetrical, Greek Revival style frame farmhouse. It has multiple cross gables and ornate and extensive porches. It features stained glass and turned and sawnwork ornament.

It was listed on the National Register of Historic Places in 1986.
