= Black Creek Rural Historic District =

Historic district in North Carolina, United States

- U.S. National Register of Historic Places
- U.S. Historic district
- Location within North Carolina Location within the United States
- Location: Along NC 1628, near Black Creek, North Carolina
- Coordinates: 35°37′36″N 77°52′22″W
- Area: 860 acres (350 ha)
- Built: 1787
- Architectural style: Greek Revival, Georgian, Federal
- MPS: Wilson MRA
- NRHP reference No.: 86001659
- Added to NRHP: October 14, 1986

Black Creek Rural Historic District is a national historic district located near Black Creek, Wilson County, North Carolina. It encompasses 68 contributing buildings in a rural area near Black Creek. The district developed after 1787 and includes notable examples of Federal, Georgian, and Greek Revival style architecture. Notable buildings include the Shadrack Dickinson House (1787), Dr. Brooks House (c. 1852), John Woodard House (c. 1800), Stephen Woodard House (c. 1817), and Dr. Stephen Woodard House (c. 1855).

It was listed on the National Register of Historic Places in 1986.
