= Dr. H. D. Lucas House =

Historic house in North Carolina, United States

- U.S. National Register of Historic Places
- Location within North Carolina Location within the United States
- Location: Center St., Black Creek, North Carolina
- Coordinates: 35°38′12″N 77°56′4″W
- Area: Less than one acre
- Built: c. 1850, c. 1885
- Architectural style: Greek Revival, Victorian Cottage
- MPS: Wilson MRA
- NRHP reference No.: 86000771
- Added to NRHP: February 13, 1986

Dr. H. D. Lucas House was a historic home located at Black Creek, Wilson County, North Carolina. It consisted of two sections: a one-story Greek Revival style doctor's office built about 1850, and a late-19th century, Victorian cottage dated to the early 1880s, which served as Dr. Lucas' residence. The cottage was a one-story, three-bay, single-pile frame dwelling with a steeply pitched gable roof. The house has been demolished.

It was listed on the National Register of Historic Places in 1986.
