= Alfred and Martha Jane Thompson House and Williams Barn =

Historic house in North Carolina, United States

- U.S. National Register of Historic Places
- Location within North Carolina Location within the United States
- Location: NC 1314, 0.4 miles W of NC 58, near New Hope, North Carolina
- Coordinates: 35°48′36″N 77°57′18″W
- Area: 5 acres (2.0 ha)
- Built: c. 1895, c. 1930
- Architectural style: Greek Revival, Italianate
- NRHP reference No.: 02000007
- Added to NRHP: February 14, 2002

Alfred and Martha Jane Thompson House and Williams Barn is a historic home located near New Hope, Wilson County, North Carolina. It was built in approximately 1895, and is a one-story, three-bay, frame double-pile dwelling with Greek Revival and Italianate style design elements. It is sheathed in weatherboard and has a brick pier foundation and an engaged front porch. The property also contains a gambrel roofed barn built about 1930.

It was listed on the National Register of Historic Places in 2002.
