= Sallie Baldwin Howard =

American educator (1916–2018)

- Born: Sallie Baldwin Sims; March 23, 1916; Wilson, North Carolina, U.S.
- Died: September 25, 2018 (aged 102); Wilson, North Carolina, U.S.
- Other names: Sallie B. Howard; Sallie Baldwin Townsend Howard; Bibi Howard
- Education: Darden High School; Kittrell College; Hunter College (BA, MA)
- Occupations: Educator; actress; playwright; poet
- Organizations: American Negro Theatre; Community Parent Youth Association (CPYA); Youth Enrichment Program (YEP)
- Known for: Co-founding the Sallie B. Howard School of Arts & Science
- Notable work: The Passing of a Dinosaur
- Spouse: Arthur P. Howard (m. 1942)
- Parents: Marcellus Sims (father); Narcissus Sims (mother)

Sallie Baldwin Howard (1916–2018) was an actor and educator in New York City. Sallie B. Howard School in Wilson, North Carolina is named for her.

== Early life and education ==
Sallie Baldwin Howard was born in Wilson, North Carolina, in 1916 to a family of sharecroppers. Although she started school late, she had a passion for education and was valedictorian of the 1938 class at Darden High School. Shortly after high school, she entered Kittrell College. She studied there for two years before marrying Arthur P. Howard in 1942. In 1943, the Howards moved to New York City. Once there, Mrs. Howard studied creative writing and joined Harlem's famous American Negro Theatre. At ANT, she trained and performed with world-renowned performers including Sidney Poitier, Esther Rolle, Isabel Sanford, Ruby Dee, and Harry Belafonte. Mrs. Howard received a scholarship to Hunter College, in 1950, where she earned B.A. and master's degrees in Elementary Education.

== Career ==
Once Mrs. Howard's education was complete, the couple moved to Long Island, where she began her journey as an educator at Public School 50Q. Mrs. Howard's drive to empower young people in the community-led her to create the Community Parent Youth Association (CPYA), a youth theatre troupe for which she wrote plays and poems.

Upon her retirement in 1979, Mrs. Howard returned to North Carolina and became an active member of St. John A.M.E Zion Church. While there, she organized the youth choir, usher board, drama department, the academic honor roll, and mini gospel band where youth members learned to play percussion, string instruments, and piano.

In 1989, Mrs. Sallie B. Howard and Dr. JoAnne Woodard founded the Youth Enrichment Program (YEP) at St John Church. Their goal was to raise the educational achievement and aspirations of at-risk children. With the support of nearby churches and community leaders, they launched YEP as a summer camp that went to serve over 400 children every summer for the next 8 years.

The positive impact of YEP on the community-led Dr. Woodward and Mrs. Howard to develop a more permanent year-round presence in Wilson, North Carolina. In 1997, YEP was granted a license to operate a charter school, and thus, the Sallie B. Howard School of Arts and Education was born. Even at age 93, Howard was greeting students back to school after the summer and actively sought ways to invigorate the local community Today Sallie B. Howard School of Arts and Science serves students in grades K-12, features a performing arts-based and science-based curriculum, study abroad opportunities and a culturally diverse faculty.

== Personal life ==
She married Arthur P. Howard in 1942. She had no children of her own. She died on September 25, 2018.
