= East Wilson Historic District =

Historic district in North Carolina, United States

- U.S. National Register of Historic Places
- U.S. Historic district
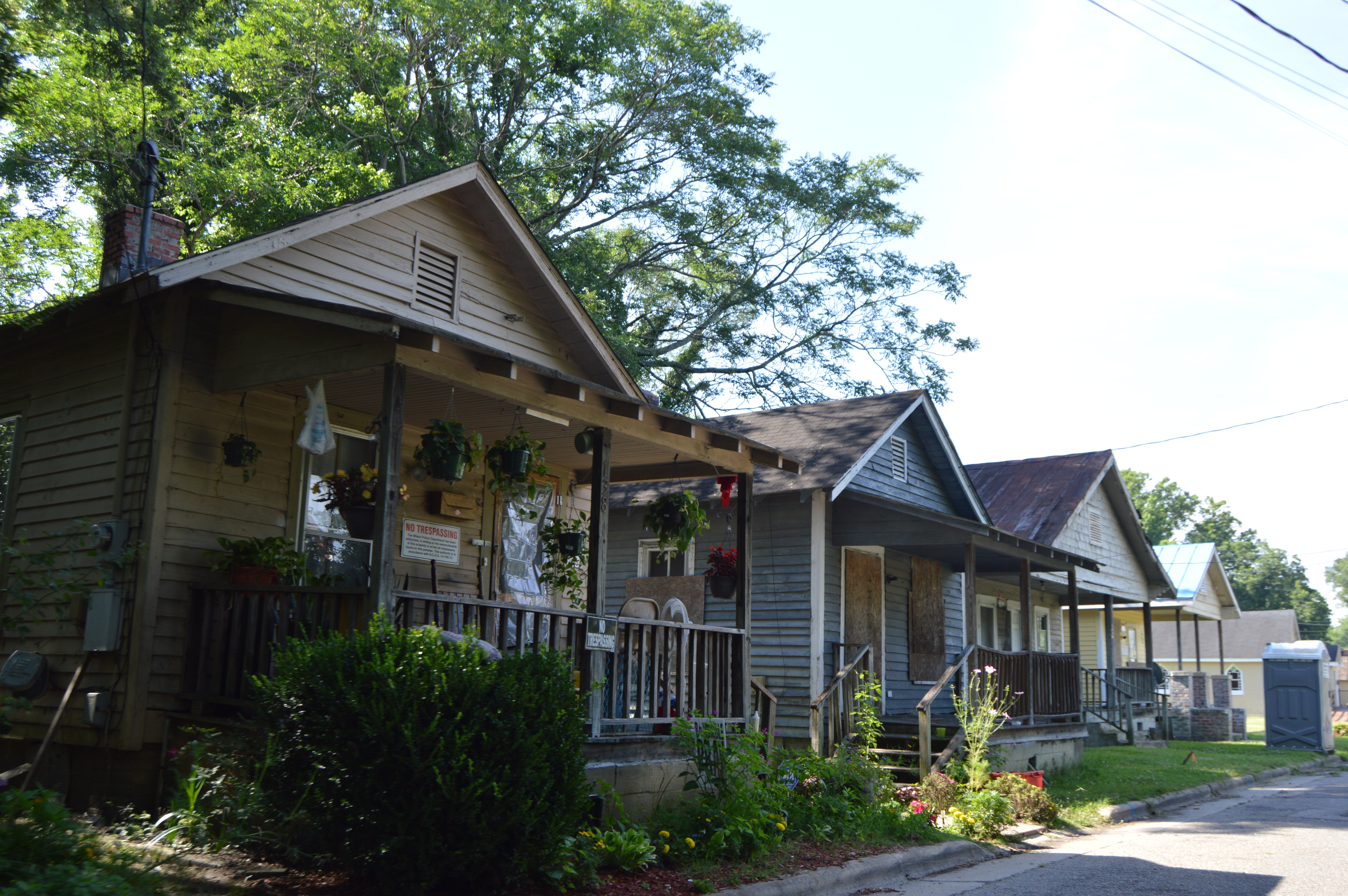
- Shotgun houses on Ash Street

- Location within North Carolina Location within the United States
- Location: Roughly bounded by E. Gold and Academy Sts., Ward Blvd., Woodard Street Ave. and Elvie St., and Railroad and Pender Sts., Wilson, North Carolina
- Coordinates: 35°43′10″N 77°54′10″W
- Area: 220 acres (89 ha)
- Built: 1890
- Architect: Nestus Freeman; Multiple
- Architectural style: Bungalow/craftsman, Queen Anne, Shotgun house
- NRHP reference No.: 88000371
- Added to NRHP: April 11, 1988

East Wilson Historic District is a national historic district located at Wilson, Wilson County, North Carolina. It encompasses 858 contributing buildings and 2 contributing structures in a historically African-American section of Wilson. The district developed between about 1890 to 1940 and includes notable examples of Queen Anne, Bungalow / American Craftsman, and Shotgun style architecture. Notable buildings include the Reverend Henry W. Farrior House (c. 1890), Charles Thomas House, Samuel Vick House, Dr. Mathew Gillam House, Wilson Colored High School (1924), and Samuel H. Vick Elementary School (1939).

It was listed on the National Register of Historic Places in 1988.
