= Cherry Hotel =

Historic building in North Carolina, US

- U.S. National Register of Historic Places
- U.S. Historic district – Contributing property
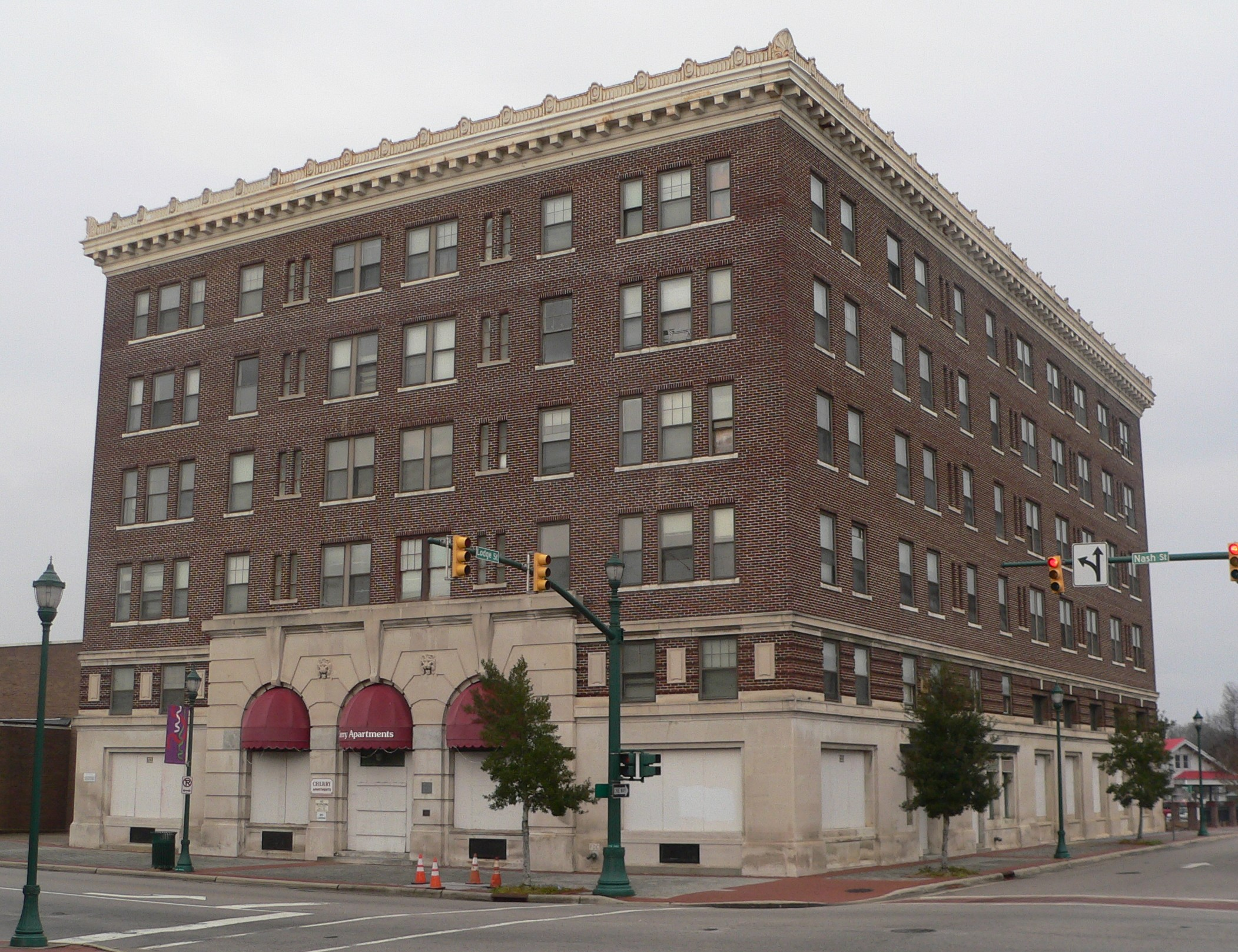

- Location within North Carolina Location within the United States
- Location: 333 E. Nash St., Wilson, North Carolina
- Coordinates: 35.723418°N 77.908412°W
- Built: 1917
- Built by: Stout, Joe W.
- Architect: Benton, Charles Collins
- Architectural style: Beaux Arts
- NRHP reference No.: 82003531
- Added to NRHP: August 26, 1982

The Cherry Hotel is a historic hotel building located at Wilson, Wilson County, North Carolina. It was designed by Charles Collins Benton in Beaux Arts style and built in 1917. It is a six-story, U-shaped brick building with approximately 200 rooms. The interior features a two-story lobby with Art Deco style lighting fixtures. The hotel closed in 1981. It was subsequently converted to apartments.

It was listed on the National Register of Historic Places in 1982. It is located in the Wilson Central Business-Tobacco Warehouse Historic District.
