= Black Creek, North Carolina =

- Town
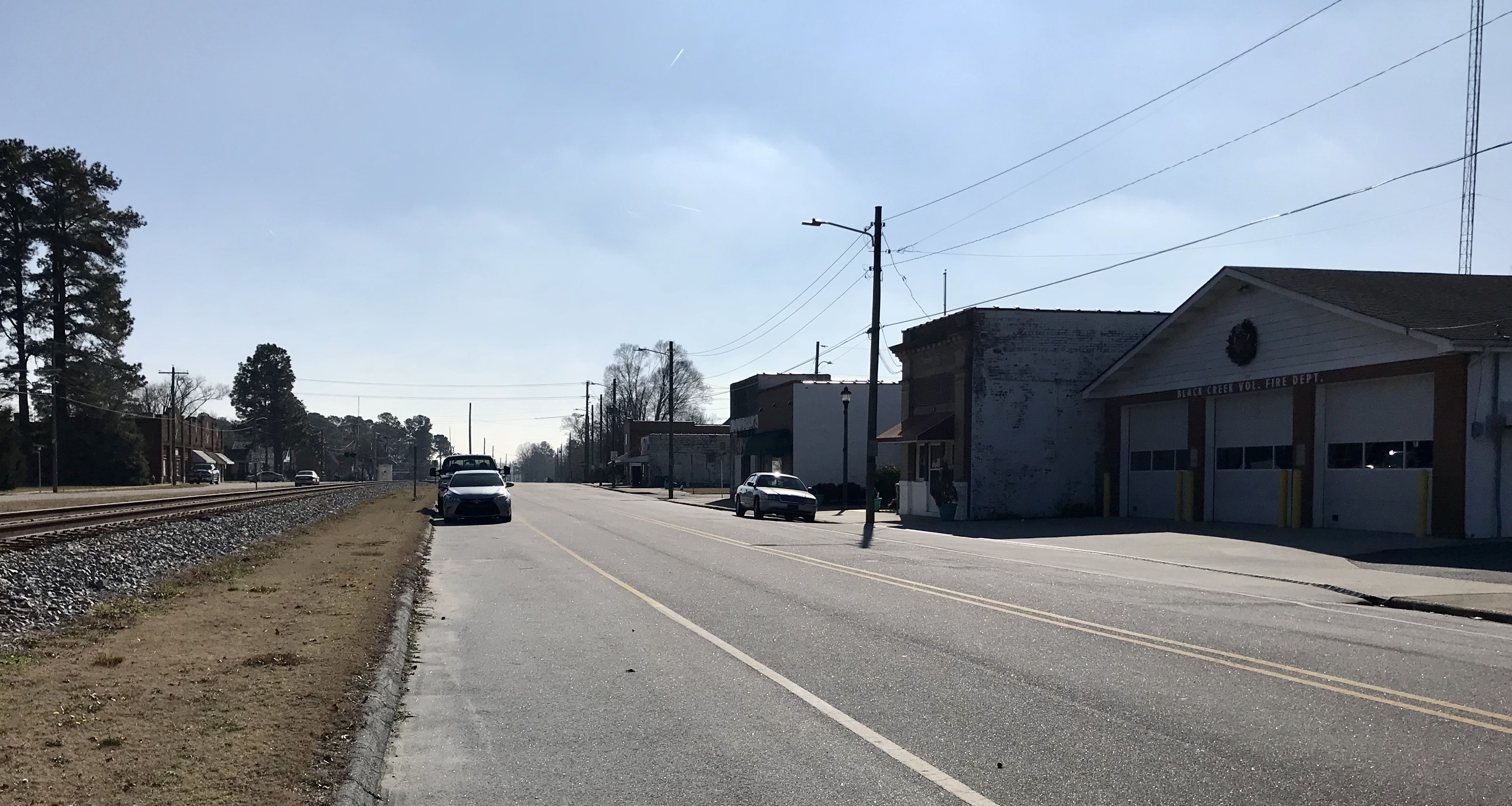
- West Center Street in 2021
- Motto: "A Small Town With A Big Heart"
- Location within the state of North Carolina
- Coordinates: 35°38′11″N 77°55′58″W
- Country: United States
- State: North Carolina
- County: Wilson

Area
  - Total: 0.71 sq mi (1.84 km^{2})
  - Land: 0.71 sq mi (1.83 km^{2})
  - Water: 0 sq mi (0.00 km^{2})
- Elevation: 125 ft (38 m)

Population (2020)
  - Total: 692
  - Density: 977.4/sq mi (377.38/km^{2})
- Time zone: UTC-5 (Eastern (EST))
  - Summer (DST): UTC-4 (EDT)
- ZIP code: 27813
- Area code: 252
- FIPS code: 37-06080
- GNIS feature ID: 2405271
- Website: http://www.townofblackcreek.org/

Black Creek is a town in Wilson County, North Carolina, United States. As of the 2020 census, Black Creek had a population of 692.

== History ==
The Manalcus Aycock House, Black Creek Rural Historic District, and Dr. H. D. Lucas House were listed on the National Register of Historic Places in 1986.

== Geography ==
According to the United States Census Bureau, the town has a total area of 0.7 square miles (1.8 km^{2}), all land.

== Demographics ==
Historical population
Census	Pop.	Note	%±
1870	77		—
1880	129		67.5%
1890	191		48.1%
1900	196		2.6%
1910	219		11.7%
1920	274		25.1%
1930	355		29.6%
1940	333		−6.2%
1950	316		−5.1%
1960	310		−1.9%
1970	449		44.8%
1980	523		16.5%
1990	615		17.6%
2000	714		16.1%
2010	769		7.7%
2020	692		−10.0%
U.S. Decennial Census

As of the census of 2000, there were 714 people, 279 households, and 210 families residing in the town. The population density was 1,062.0 inhabitants per square mile (410.0/km^{2}). There were 296 housing units at an average density of 440.3 per square mile (170.0/km^{2}). The racial makeup of the town was 77.73% White, 18.91% African American, 0.28% Asian, 0.70% from other races, and 2.38% from two or more races. Hispanic or Latino of any race were 2.24% of the population.

There were 279 households, out of which 38.0% had children under the age of 18 living with them, 53.0% were married couples living together, 17.2% had a female householder with no husband present, and 24.4% were non-families. 21.5% of all households were made up of individuals, and 6.1% had someone living alone who was 65 years of age or older. The average household size was 2.54 and the average family size was 2.91.

In the town, the population was spread out, with 26.9% under the age of 18, 9.8% from 18 to 24, 32.1% from 25 to 44, 22.1% from 45 to 64, and 9.1% who were 65 years of age or older. The median age was 34 years. For every 100 females, there were 87.4 males. For every 100 females age 18 and over, there were 89.1 males.

The median income for a household in the town was $30,368, and the median income for a family was $32,857. Males had a median income of $27,679 versus $20,909 for females. The per capita income for the town was $13,661. About 17.4% of families and 16.9% of the population were below the poverty line, including 19.7% of those under age 18 and 21.0% of those age 65 or over.
