= Saratoga, North Carolina =

- Town
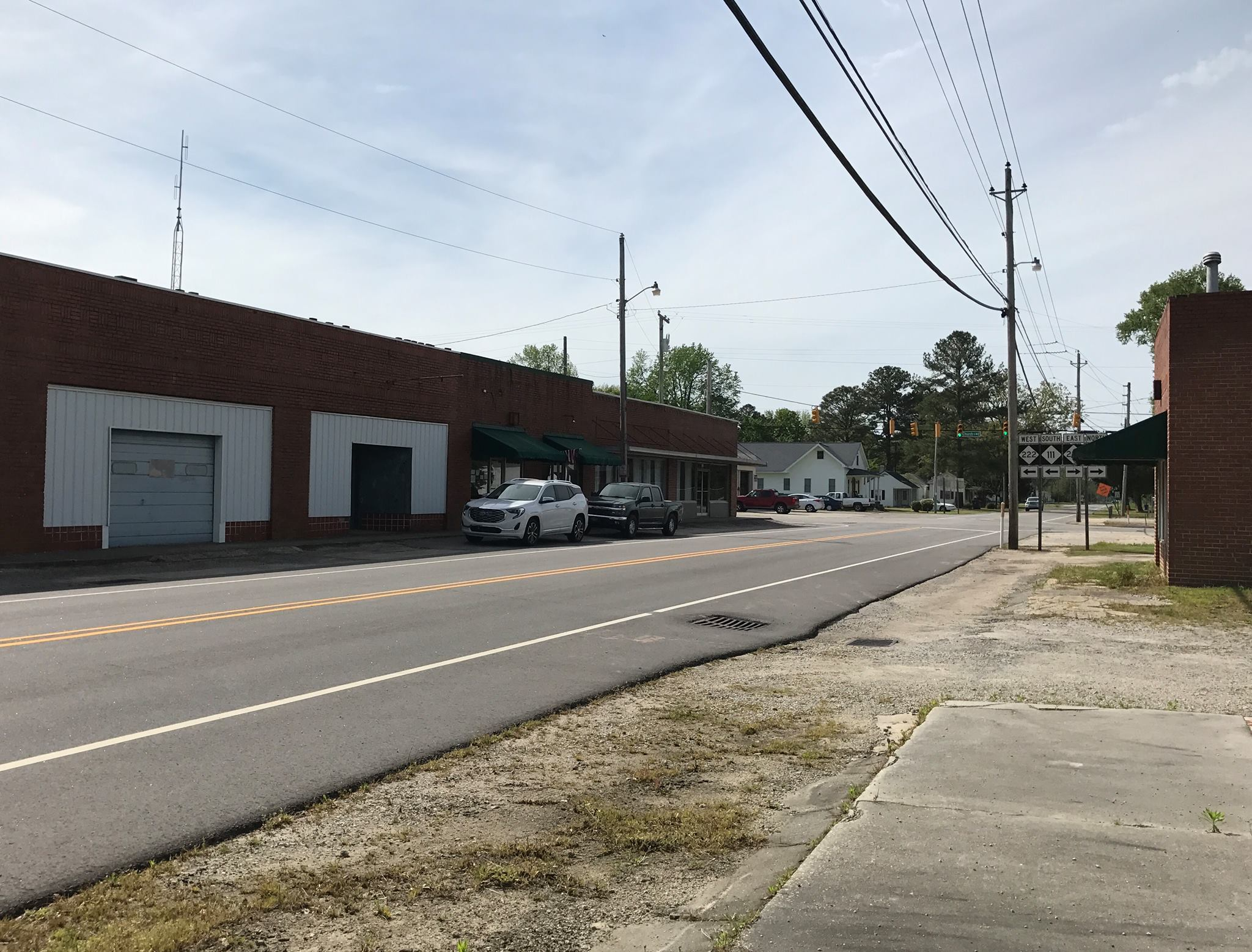

- Location within the state of North Carolina
- Coordinates: 35°39′13″N 77°46′32″W
- Country: United States
- State: North Carolina
- County: Wilson

Area
  - Total: 0.63 sq mi (1.64 km^{2})
  - Land: 0.63 sq mi (1.64 km^{2})
  - Water: 0 sq mi (0.00 km^{2})
- Elevation: 118 ft (36 m)

Population (2020)
  - Total: 353
  - Density: 558/sq mi (215.5/km^{2})
- Time zone: UTC-5 (Eastern (EST))
  - Summer (DST): UTC-4 (EDT)
- ZIP code: 27873
- Area code: 252
- FIPS code: 37-59340
- GNIS feature ID: 2407288
- Website: https://townofsaratoganc.org/

Saratoga is a town in Wilson County, North Carolina, United States. As of the 2020 census, Saratoga had a population of 353.

== History ==
The Maj. James Scarborough House was listed on the National Register of Historic Places in 1982.

== Geography ==
According to the United States Census Bureau, the town has a total area of 0.6 square miles (1.6 km^{2}), all land.

For transportation, Saratoga is served by U.S. Route 264 and Interstate 587 (North Carolina).

== Demographics ==
Historical population
Census	Pop.	Note	%±
1880	81		—
1890	102		25.9%
1900	123		20.6%
1910	136		10.6%
1940	292		—
1950	366		25.3%
1960	409		11.7%
1970	391		−4.4%
1980	381		−2.6%
1990	342		−10.2%
2000	379		10.8%
2010	408		7.7%
2020	353		−13.5%
U.S. Decennial Census

As of the census of 2000, there were 379 people, 158 households, and 102 families residing in the town. The population density was 590.3 inhabitants per square mile (227.9/km^{2}). There were 168 housing units at an average density of 261.7 per square mile (101.0/km^{2}). The racial makeup of the town was 76.25% White, 19.79% African American, 3.43% from other races, and 0.53% from two or more races. Hispanic or Latino of any race were 5.80% of the population.

There were 158 households, out of which 28.5% had children under the age of 18 living with them, 43.7% were married couples living together, 20.3% had a female householder with no husband present, and 35.4% were non-families. 32.3% of all households were made up of individuals, and 17.1% had someone living alone who was 65 years of age or older. The average household size was 2.40 and the average family size was 2.95.

In the town, the population was spread out, with 23.5% under the age of 18, 5.8% from 18 to 24, 29.6% from 25 to 44, 23.5% from 45 to 64, and 17.7% who were 65 years of age or older. The median age was 40 years. For every 100 females, there were 84.0 males. For every 100 females age 18 and over, there were 75.8 males.

The median income for a household in the town was $31,667, and the median income for a family was $37,750. Males had a median income of $33,125 versus $25,469 for females. The per capita income for the town was $15,317. About 8.2% of families and 13.1% of the population were below the poverty line, including 16.4% of those under age 18 and 8.7% of those age 65 or over.
