= Wilson Medical Center (North Carolina) =

Coordinates: 35.7195668°N 77.9431671°W

Geography
- Location: Wilson, North Carolina, United States

Organization
- Care system: Duke LifePoint
- Type: Community
- Affiliated university: Duke University

Services
- Beds: 294 (2013); 317 (2009)

Links
- Website: www.wilsonmedical.com
- Lists: Hospitals in North Carolina

Wilson Medical Center is a 294-bed hospital located in Wilson, North Carolina, serving Wilson and the surrounding counties. It was established in the 1960s and is the only hospital located in Wilson County. The hospital's chief executive is Christopher Munton.
