= Branch Banking Company Building (Wilson, North Carolina) =

Historic building in North Carolina, US

- Branch Banking
- U.S. National Register of Historic Places
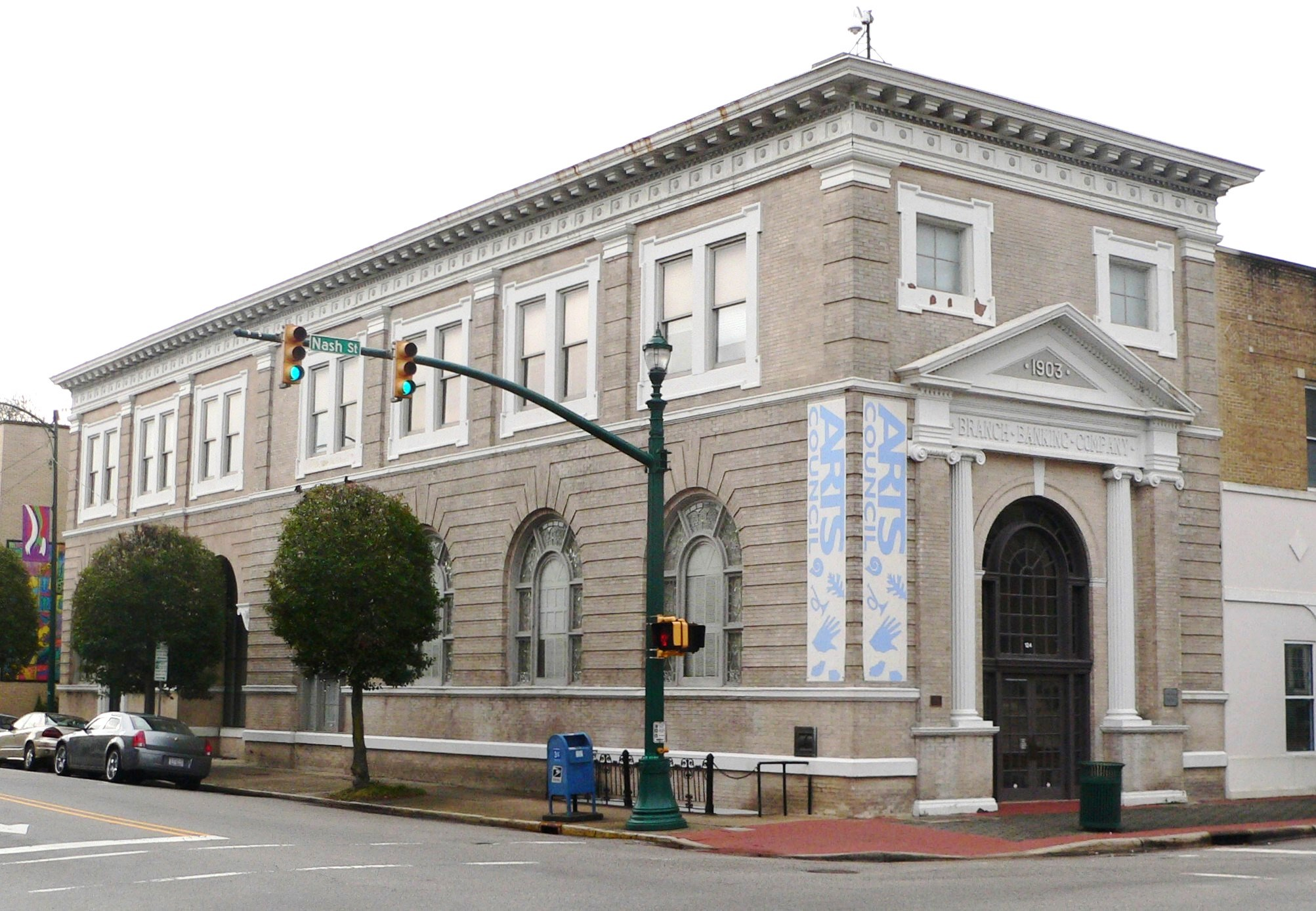
- (December 2014)

- Location within North Carolina
- Location: 124 Nash St. NE; Wilson, North Carolina
- Coordinates: 35°43′29″N 77°54′36″W
- Built: 1903
- Architectural style: Classical Revival, Second Renaissance Revival
- NRHP reference No.: 78001986
- Added to NRHP: August 11, 1978

The Branch Banking Company Building is a historic bank building located in Wilson, North Carolina. It was built by the Branch Banking and Trust Company in 1903, and is a two-story, rectangular, blond brick building in the Classical Revival / Renaissance Revival style. A three bay extension was built in 1934. It features reddish sandstone detailing such as the window surrounds, pediment, columns and capitals; and an overhanging pressed metal cornice. It was listed on the National Register of Historic Places in 1978. It is located in the Wilson Central Business-Tobacco Warehouse Historic District.

The building is now the headquarters of the Arts Council of Wilson.
