= Lucama, North Carolina =

- Town
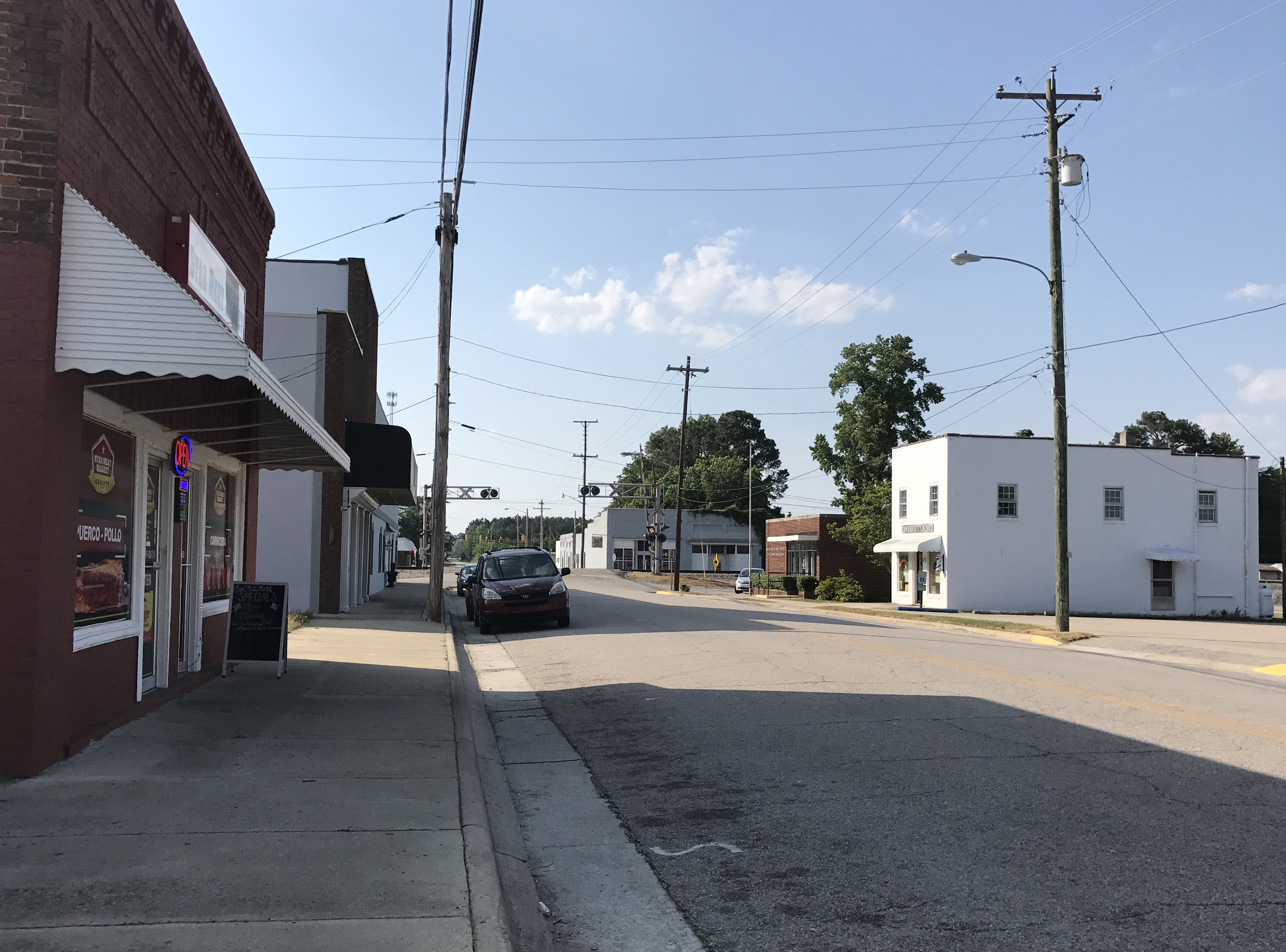
- Main Street, 2019
- Motto: "Heart of Tobacco Country"
- Location within the state of North Carolina Lucama, North Carolina (the United States)
- Coordinates: 35°38′41″N 78°00′27″W
- Country: United States
- State: North Carolina
- County: Wilson

Area
  - Total: 0.61 sq mi (1.57 km^{2})
  - Land: 0.61 sq mi (1.57 km^{2})
  - Water: 0 sq mi (0.00 km^{2})
- Elevation: 125 ft (38 m)

Population (2020)
  - Total: 1,036
  - Density: 1,700/sq mi (658/km^{2})
- Time zone: UTC-5 (Eastern (EST))
  - Summer (DST): UTC-4 (EDT)
- ZIP code: 27851
- Area code: 252
- FIPS code: 37-39600
- GNIS feature ID: 2406056
- Website: https://lucamanc.com/

Lucama (/luˈkɑːmə/ loo-KAH-muh) is a town in Wilson County, North Carolina, United States. The population was 1,036 at the 2020 census.

== History ==
The name Lucama is rumored by folk tradition to have been coined by Josephus Daniels around 1883 to honor three local women named Lucy, Carrie, and Mary, by combining the first two letters of each of their names. A U.S. post office was established in 1884, and the town was incorporated in 1889.

The Lucama Municipal Historic District was listed on the National Register of Historic Places in 1986.

== Geography ==
According to the United States Census Bureau, the town has a total area of 0.6 square miles (1.6 km^{2}), all land.

== Government ==
Lucama operates under a mayor–council government, with five elected town councilors and an elected mayor. The council is assisted in its governance by a town administrator.

== Demographics ==
Historical population
Census	Pop.	Note	%±
1900	236		—
1910	266		12.7%
1920	316		18.8%
1930	363		14.9%
1940	362		−0.3%
1950	405		11.9%
1960	498		23.0%
1970	610		22.5%
1980	1,070		75.4%
1990	933		−12.8%
2000	847		−9.2%
2010	1,108		30.8%
2020	1,036		−6.5%
U.S. Decennial Census

As of the census of 2000, there were 847 people, 387 households, and 229 families residing in the town. The population density was 1,429.8 inhabitants per square mile (552.0/km^{2}). There were 415 housing units at an average density of 700.5 per square mile (270.5/km^{2}). The racial makeup of the town was 78.16% White, 16.17% African American, 0.47% Asian, 4.13% from other races, and 1.06% from two or more races. Hispanic or Latino of any race were 6.49% of the population.

There were 387 households, out of which 25.3% had children under the age of 18 living with them, 43.7% were married couples living together, 12.7% had a female householder with no husband present, and 40.6% were non-families. 34.4% of all households were made up of individuals, and 13.2% had someone living alone who was 65 years of age or older. The average household size was 2.18 and the average family size was 2.78.

In the town, the population was spread out, with 20.9% under the age of 18, 8.9% from 18 to 24, 27.7% from 25 to 44, 23.0% from 45 to 64, and 19.5% who were 65 years of age or older. The median age was 40 years. For every 100 females, there were 91.2 males. For every 100 females age 18 and over, there were 88.7 males.

The median income for a household in the town was $28,125, and the median income for a family was $37,750. Males had a median income of $26,786 versus $22,596 for females. The per capita income for the town was $17,634. About 11.5% of families and 18.8% of the population were below the poverty line, including 22.3% of those under age 18 and 22.4% of those age 65 or over.

== Works cited ==
- Powell, William S. (1976). The North Carolina Gazetteer: A Dictionary of Tar Heel Places. Chapel Hill: University of North Carolina Press. ISBN 9780807812471. OCLC 733691912.
