= Davis-Whitehead-Harriss House =

Historic house in North Carolina, United States

- U.S. National Register of Historic Places
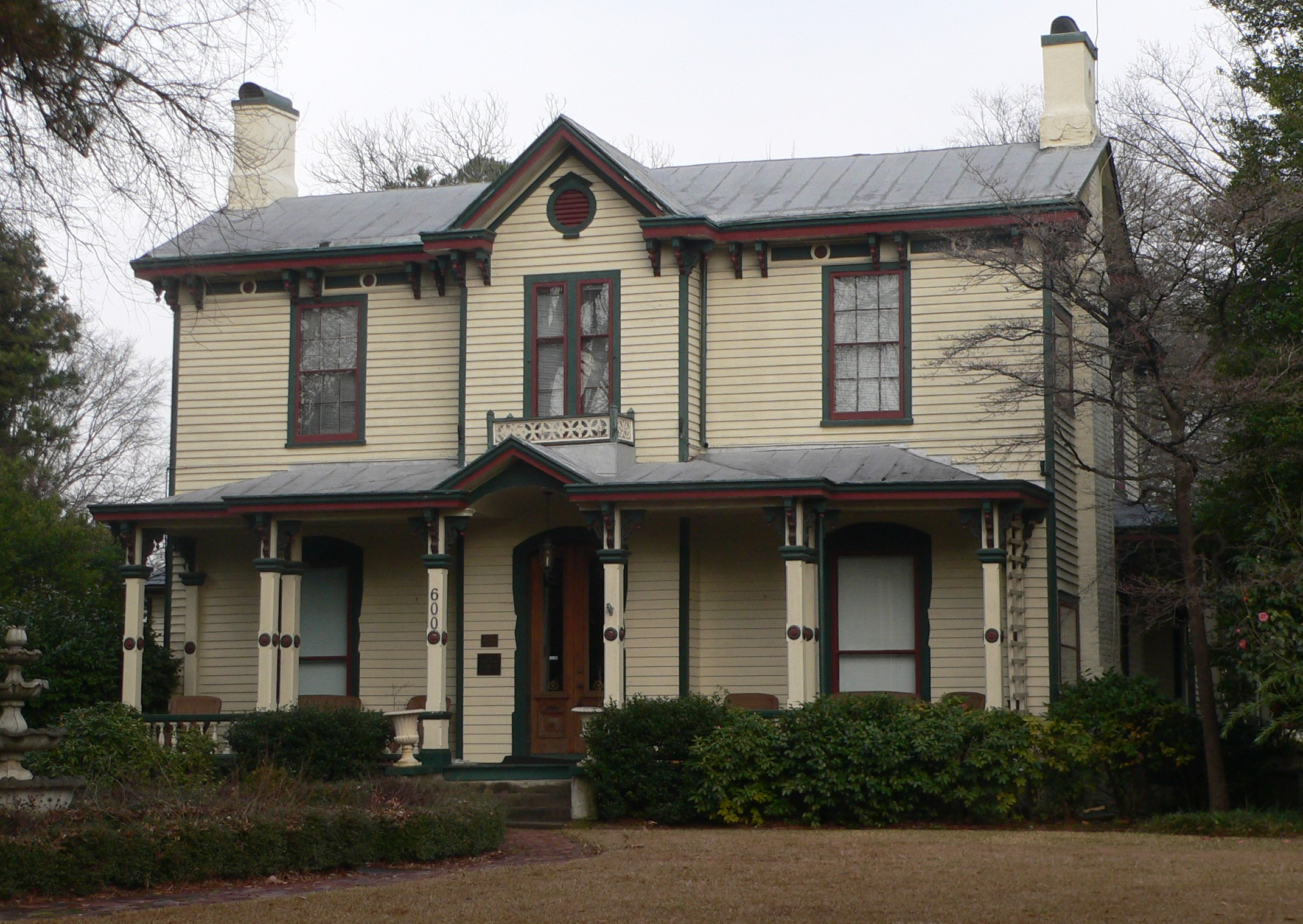
- Davis-Whitehead-Harriss house, December 2014

- Location within North Carolina Location within the United States
- Location: 600 W. Nash St., Wilson, North Carolina
- Coordinates: 35°43′57″N 77°54′57″W
- Area: 1 acre (0.40 ha)
- Built: 1858, 1872
- Built by: Lipscomb, Oswald
- Architectural style: Italianate
- NRHP reference No.: 82003532
- Added to NRHP: June 14, 1982

Davis-Whitehead-Harriss House is a historic home located at Wilson, Wilson County, North Carolina. It was built in 1858, and renovated in 1872 in the Italianate style. It is a two-story, three bays wide, "T"-plan, frame dwelling, with a rear ell. It has single-shouldered, brick end chimneys with stuccoed stacks and a one-story, hipped roof front porch. Also on the property is a two-story frame carriage house built in 1925.

It was listed on the National Register of Historic Places in 1982.
