= Wilson, North Carolina =

City in Wilson County, North Carolina, US

- City
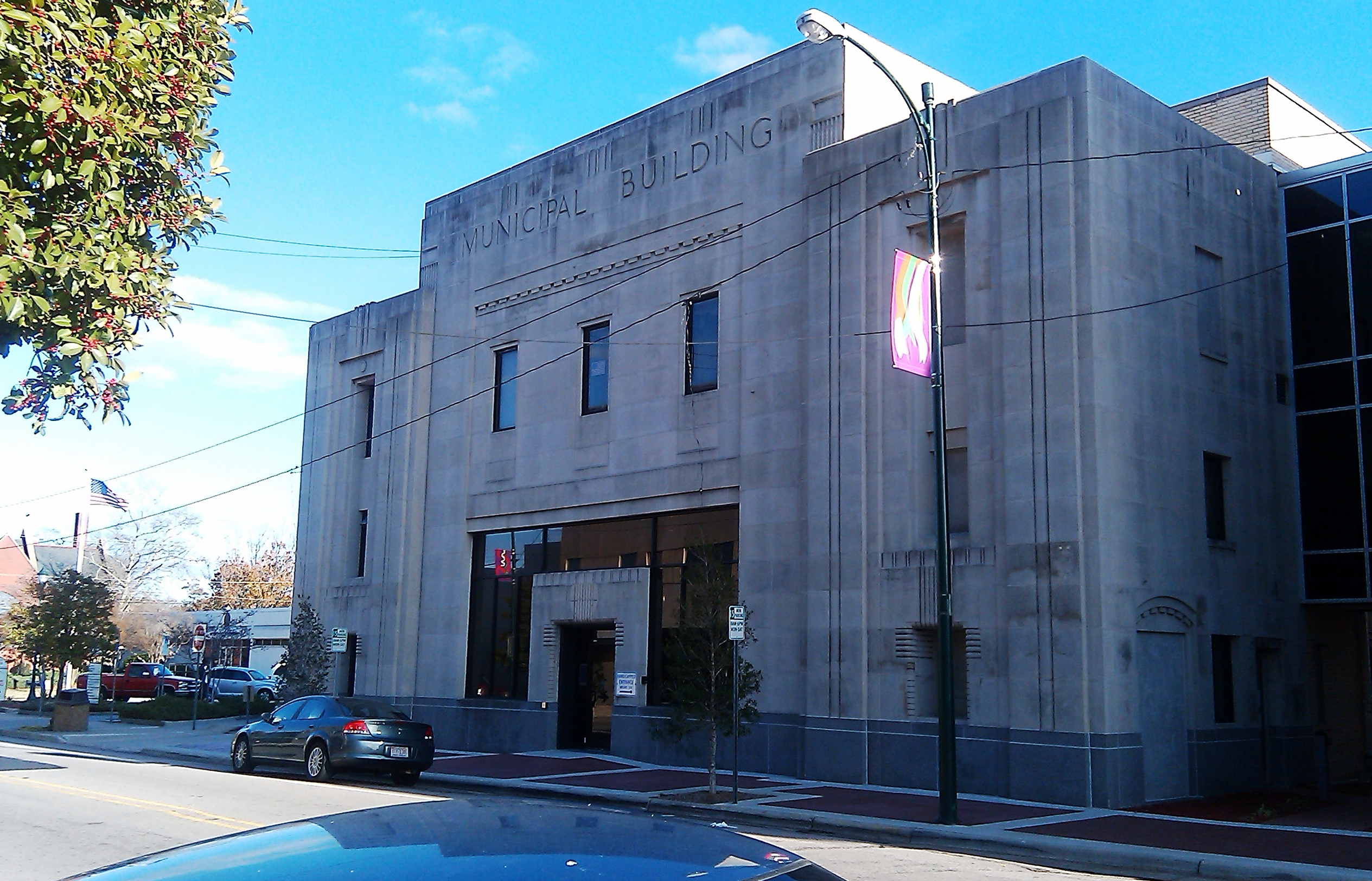
- Wilson Municipal Building

- Flag Seal Logo

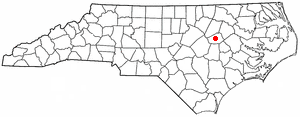
- Location of Wilson in Wilson County, North Carolina

- Location within the contiguous United States of America Wilson (the United States) Wilson (North America)
- Coordinates: 35°43′53″N 77°55′43″W
- Country: United States
- State: North Carolina
- County: Wilson
- Townships: Black Creek; Old Fields; Stantonsburg; Taylors; Toisnot; Wilson
- Incorporated: January 29, 1849
- Named for: Col. Louis D. Wilson

Government
  - Type: Council–Manager
  - Council: Wilson City Council
  - Manager: Grant Goings

Area
  - Total: 32.12 sq mi (83.18 km^{2})
  - Land: 31.24 sq mi (80.92 km^{2})
  - Water: 0.87 sq mi (2.26 km^{2})
- Elevation: 108 ft (33 m)

Population (2020)
  - Total: 47,851
  - Density: 1,531.5/sq mi (591.32/km^{2})
- Time zone: UTC−5 (Eastern Time Zone (USA/Canada))
  - Summer (DST): UTC−4 (-4)
- Zip Codes: 27822, 27880, 27893, 27894, 27895, 27896
- Area code: 252
- FIPS code: 37-74540
- GNIS feature ID: 2405758
- Website: wilsonnc.org

Wilson is a city in and the county seat of Wilson County, North Carolina, United States. It is the 23rd most populous city in North Carolina. Located approximately 40 mi (64 km) east of the capital city of Raleigh, it is served by the interchange of Interstate 95 and U.S. Route 264. As of the 2020 census, Wilson had a population of 47,851. It is also an anchor city of the Rocky Mount-Wilson-Roanoke Rapids CSA, with a total population of 297,726 as of 2018.

In the early 21st century, Wilson was ranked as 18th in size among North Carolina's 500-plus municipalities. From 1990 to 2010, the city population increased by more than 40 percent, primarily due to construction of new subdivisions that attracted many new residents. This has been accompanied by new retail and shopping construction, primarily in the northwestern parts of the city. Wilson is a diverse community; in 2012, the US Census estimated that 48% of the population identified as African American, and 43% as Whites; the remaining 9% includes Latinos and Asians, such as Vietnamese, Chinese and Indians. The U.S. Census Bureau estimated in 2012 that nearly 5,000 county residents (7.5 percent) were foreign-born. Of those, nearly 3,000 people, or 62 percent, had entered the U.S. since 2000.

Once a center of tobacco cultivation, the city was widely known as "The World's Greatest Tobacco Market" in the 19th century. In the 21st century, Wilson enjoys a diverse economy based on agriculture, manufacturing, commercial, and service businesses.

== History ==
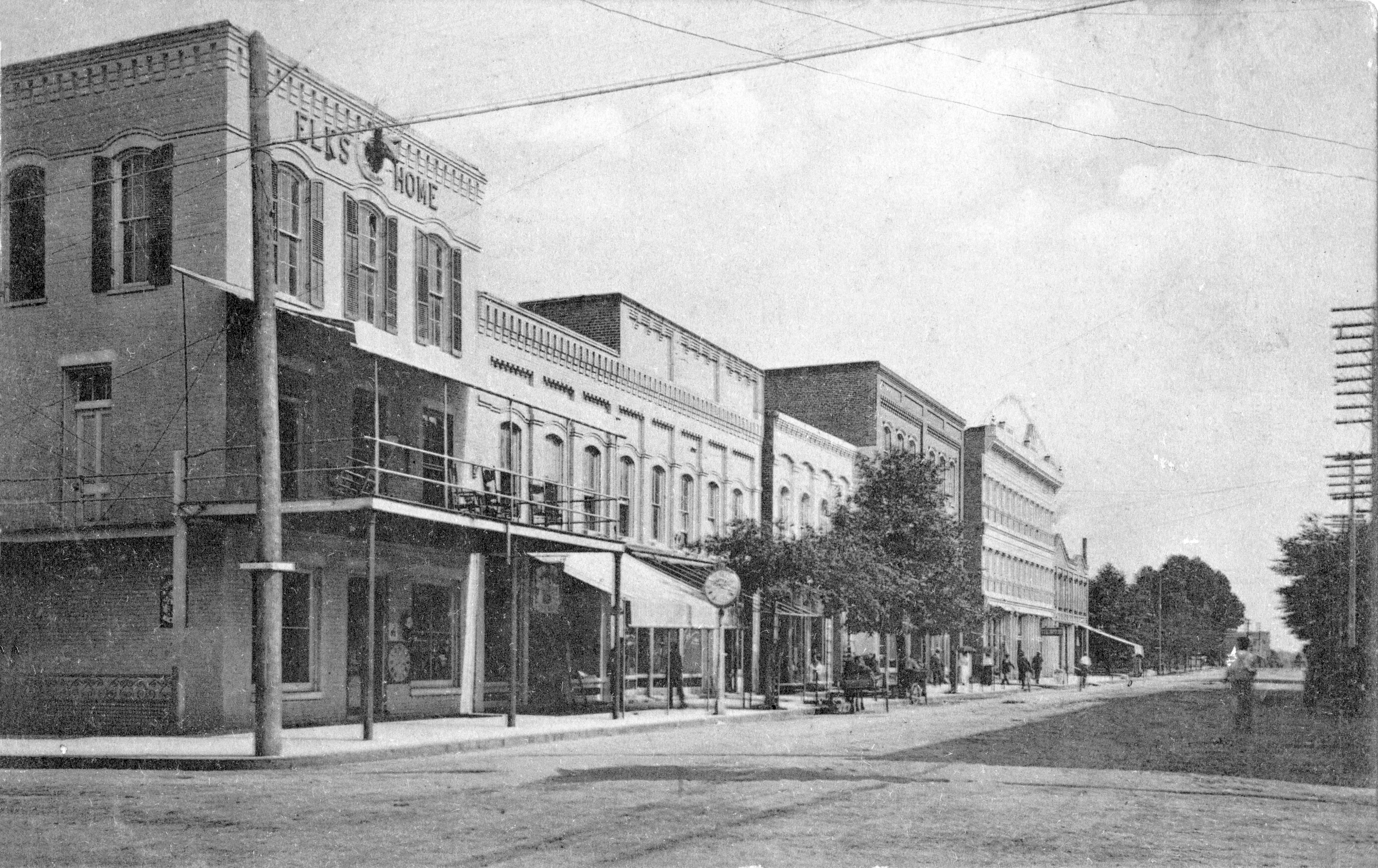
Nash Street in Wilson, 1908

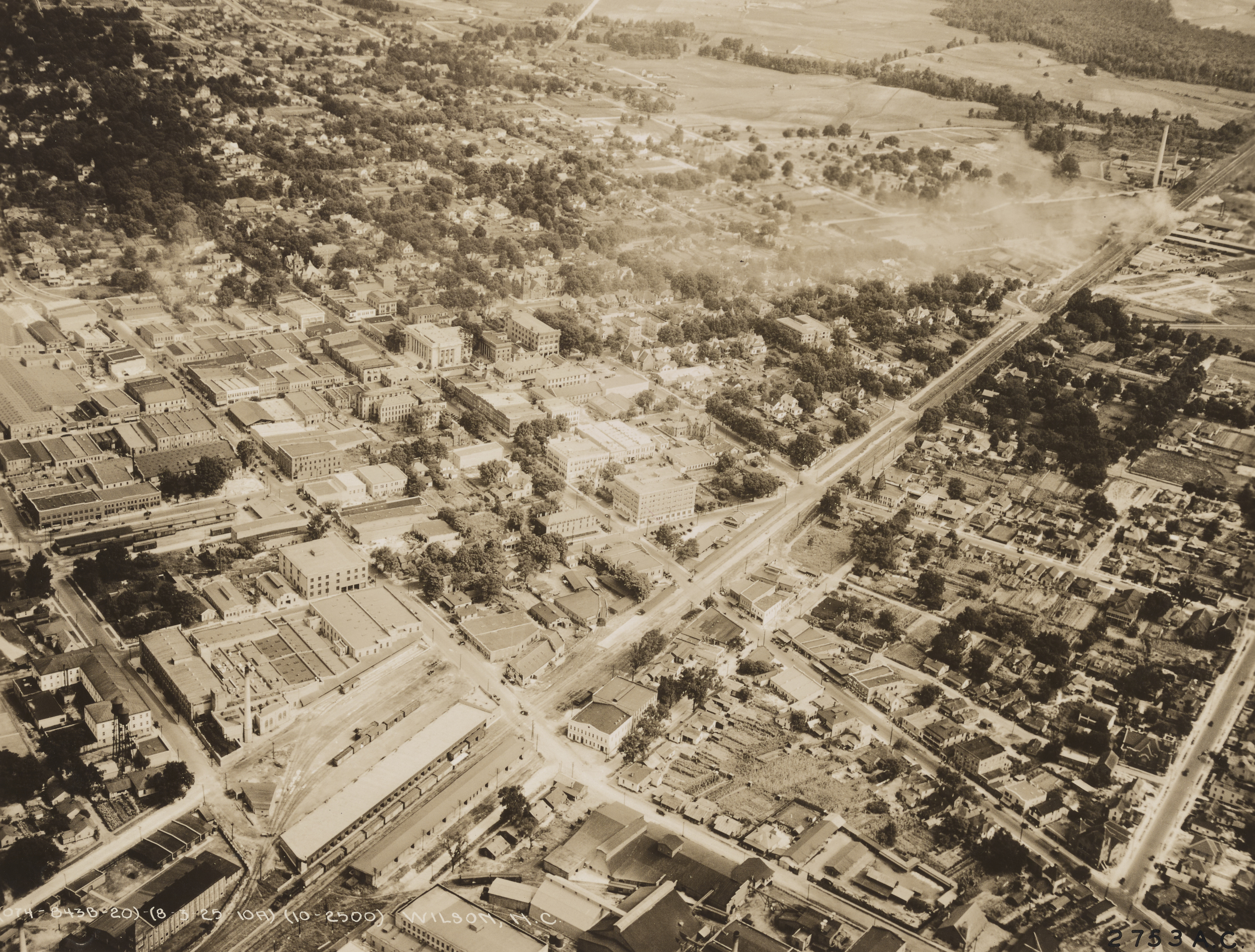
Aerial view of Wilson in 1925

The history of the city of Wilson began with a community that formed around Toisnot Primitive Baptist Church, built in the early 1800s. The community was originally called Toisnot. In 1836, the Wilmington and Raleigh Railroad Co. began building a Wilmington-to-Weldon line. The railway reached the community in 1839, and by 1840 Toisnot had both north-and-south service. That stimulated growth of the community.

The North Carolina General Assembly chartered the Town of Wilson. It was named for state senator Colonel Louis D. Wilson, U.S. Volunteers. He died of fever while on leave from the State senate during the Mexican–American War of 1848. Messrs. Joshua Barnes, John W. Farmer, James D. Barnes, Dylan Dieterle, Jonathan D. Rountree, and Arthur Farmer were named as the first town commissioners.

The Gen. Joshua Barnes House, Branch Banking, Broad–Kenan Streets Historic District, Cherry Hotel, Davis-Whitehead-Harriss House, East Wilson Historic District, Old Wilson Historic District, Joseph John Pender House, Moses Rountree House, Upper Town Creek Rural Historic District, West Nash Street Historic District, Olzie Whitehead Williams House, Wilson Central Business-Tobacco Warehouse Historic District, Wilson County Courthouse, and Woodard Family Rural Historic District are listed on the National Register of Historic Places.

== Geography ==
According to the United States Census Bureau, the city has a total area of 23.4 square miles (61 km^{2}), of which 23.3 square miles (60 km^{2}) is land and 0.2 square miles (0.52 km^{2}) (0.64%) is water.

Wilson is served by the intersection of Interstate 95 and US 264; and it is located approximately 45 minutes by car east of Raleigh, the state capital. It is the northern terminus of Interstate 795, which provides a route to Interstate 40 and the port city of Wilmington, North Carolina.

=== Climate ===
Climate data for WILSON 3 SW, NC, 1991-2020 normals
Month	Jan	Feb	Mar	Apr	May	Jun	Jul	Aug	Sep	Oct	Nov	Dec	Year
Mean daily maximum °F (°C)	52.1 (11.2)	55.4 (13.0)	62.9 (17.2)	72.5 (22.5)	79.7 (26.5)	86.8 (30.4)	90.2 (32.3)	88.2 (31.2)	82.7 (28.2)	73.4 (23.0)	63.5 (17.5)	55.5 (13.1)	71.9 (22.2)
Daily mean °F (°C)	42.4 (5.8)	44.8 (7.1)	51.6 (10.9)	60.8 (16.0)	69.0 (20.6)	76.8 (24.9)	80.6 (27.0)	79.0 (26.1)	73.4 (23.0)	62.5 (16.9)	52.3 (11.3)	45.5 (7.5)	61.6 (16.4)
Mean daily minimum °F (°C)	32.7 (0.4)	34.3 (1.3)	40.4 (4.7)	49.2 (9.6)	58.3 (14.6)	66.9 (19.4)	71.1 (21.7)	69.7 (20.9)	64.0 (17.8)	51.6 (10.9)	41.1 (5.1)	35.4 (1.9)	51.2 (10.7)
Average precipitation inches (mm)	3.75 (95)	3.04 (77)	4.16 (106)	3.88 (99)	3.92 (100)	4.14 (105)	5.75 (146)	5.33 (135)	6.08 (154)	3.36 (85)	3.29 (84)	3.60 (91)	50.30 (1,278)
Average snowfall inches (cm)	0.8 (2.0)	0.4 (1.0)	0.1 (0.25)	0.0 (0.0)	0.0 (0.0)	0.0 (0.0)	0.0 (0.0)	0.0 (0.0)	0.0 (0.0)	0.0 (0.0)	0.0 (0.0)	0.6 (1.5)	1.9 (4.8)
Average precipitation days (≥ 0.01 in)	11.1	10.0	11.2	9.3	10.3	10.0	11.0	10.1	9.4	8.2	8.6	11.0	120.2
Average snowy days (≥ 0.1 in)	0.4	0.2	0.2	0.0	0.0	0.0	0.0	0.0	0.0	0.0	0.0	0.3	1.1
Source: NOAA

== Demographics ==
Historical population
Census	Pop.	Note	%±
1860	960		—
1870	1,036		7.9%
1880	1,475		42.4%
1890	2,126		44.1%
1900	3,525		65.8%
1910	6,717		90.6%
1920	10,612		58.0%
1930	12,613		18.9%
1940	19,234		52.5%
1950	23,010		19.6%
1960	28,753		25.0%
1970	29,347		2.1%
1980	34,424		17.3%
1990	36,930		7.3%
2000	44,405		20.2%
2010	49,167		10.7%
2020	47,851		−2.7%
U.S. Decennial Census

=== 2020 census ===
As of the 2020 census, Wilson had a population of 47,851 and 19,951 households, and there were 11,529 families.

The median age was 41.1 years. 22.8% of residents were under the age of 18 and 19.5% were 65 years of age or older. For every 100 females there were 85.7 males, and for every 100 females age 18 and over there were 81.4 males age 18 and over.

99.5% of residents lived in urban areas, while 0.5% lived in rural areas.

There were 19,951 households in Wilson, of which 28.9% had children under the age of 18 living in them. Of all households, 35.7% were married-couple households, 19.1% were households with a male householder and no spouse or partner present, and 39.8% were households with a female householder and no spouse or partner present. About 34.3% of all households were made up of individuals and 15.2% had someone living alone who was 65 years of age or older.

There were 22,504 housing units, of which 11.3% were vacant. The homeowner vacancy rate was 1.7% and the rental vacancy rate was 6.3%.

Racial composition as of the 2020 census
Race	Number	Percent
White	18,106	37.8%
Black or African American	23,112	48.3%
American Indian and Alaska Native	247	0.5%
Asian	811	1.7%
Native Hawaiian and Other Pacific Islander	19	0.0%
Some other race	3,143	6.6%
Two or more races	2,413	5.0%
Hispanic or Latino (of any race)	4,824	10.1%

Wilson racial composition
Race	Number	Percentage
White (non-Hispanic)	17,503	36.58%
Black or African American (non-Hispanic)	22,914	47.89%
Native American	114	0.24%
Asian	811	1.69%
Pacific Islander	10	0.02%
Other/Mixed	1,675	3.5%
Hispanic or Latino	4,824	10.08%

=== 2000 census ===
As of the census of 2000, there were 44,405 people, 17,296 households, and 11,328 families residing in the city. The population density was 1,906.9 inhabitants per square mile (736.3/km^{2}). There were 18,660 housing units at an average density of 801.3 per square mile (309.4/km^{2}). The racial makeup of the city was 46.67% White, 47.53% African American, 0.31% Native American, 0.58% Asian, 0.02% Pacific Islander, 3.89% from other races, and 1.01% from two or more races. Hispanic or Latino of any race were 7.29% of Wilson's population.

There were 17,296 households, out of which 31.6% had children under the age of 18 living with them, 42.0% were married couples living together, 19.3% had a female householder with no husband present, and 34.5% were non-families. 29.4% of all households were made up of individuals, and 10.9% had someone living alone who was 65 years of age or older. The average household size was 2.47 and the average family size was 3.06.

In the city, the population was spread out, with 26.0% under the age of 18, 9.8% from 18 to 24, 28.9% from 25 to 44, 21.8% from 45 to 64, and 13.5% who were 65 years of age or older. The median age was 35 years. For every 100 females, there were 88.0 males. For every 100 females age 18 and over, there were 83.1 males.

The median income for a household in the city was $31,169, and the median income for a family was $41,041. Males had a median income of $30,682 versus $22,363 for females. The per capita income for the city was $17,813. About 16.5% of families and 21.6% of the population were below the poverty line, including 29.5% of those under the age of 18 and 20.4% ages 65 or older.

=== 2008–2012 American Community Survey ===
The median income for a household in the city from 2008 to 2012 was $36,469. About 26% of the population were below the poverty line.

== Economy ==
Wilson is the birthplace of Branch Banking and Trust Corporation, now Truist Financial. Now headquartered in Charlotte, North Carolina, Truist Financial is among Wilson County's top employers, with around 2,000 people working in various financial services.

Bridgestone Americas operates a plant in Wilson that employs more than 1,800 people who make radial tires for cars and light trucks. Bridgestone recently completed a 6-year, $250 million renovation of the plant, which was retooled to make run-flat passenger car tires that are sold in both the US and Japan. In 2014 the plant marked 1 million man-hours without a lost-time accident.

Other large employers include Wilson County Schools; Wilson Medical Center; Smithfield Packing Co., pork products; UTC Aerospace Systems (formerly Kidde Aerospace and Defense before UTC's acquisition), aircraft fire protection systems; Sandoz, generic prescription drugs; Merck Manufacturing Division, pharmaceutical drugs; and Ardagh Group, glass containers.

=== Largest employers ===
According to the City's 2023 Comprehensive Annual Financial Report, the top employers in the city are:

#	Employer	Number of employees
1	Truist Bank	2,200
2	Wilson County Schools	1,500
3	Collins Aerospace	984
4	NC Department of Health and Human Services	917
5	Wilson Medical Center	900
6	Wilson County	764
7	City of Wilson	760
8	Smithfield Packing Company	670
9	Alliance One	500
10	Novartis	462

== Sports ==
Wilson was the home to the Wilson Tobs of the Coastal Plain League, a collegiate summer baseball league. The Tobs played at Fleming Stadium in Wilson before moving to Smithfield North Carolina. The Tobs began play for the league's inaugural 1997 season. Wilson Speedway held 12 NASCAR Cup Series races between 1951 and 1960 as it was open at the county fairgrounds between 1934 and 1989.

The Single-A Minor League Baseball team the Carolina Mudcats ( Now Wilson Warbirds) relocate to Wilson, following the 2025 Carolina League season. They at a new $75.5-million stadium near downtown, about 20 miles (32 km) east of Five County Stadium, where they currently play in Zebulon, North Carolina.

== Tourist attractions ==
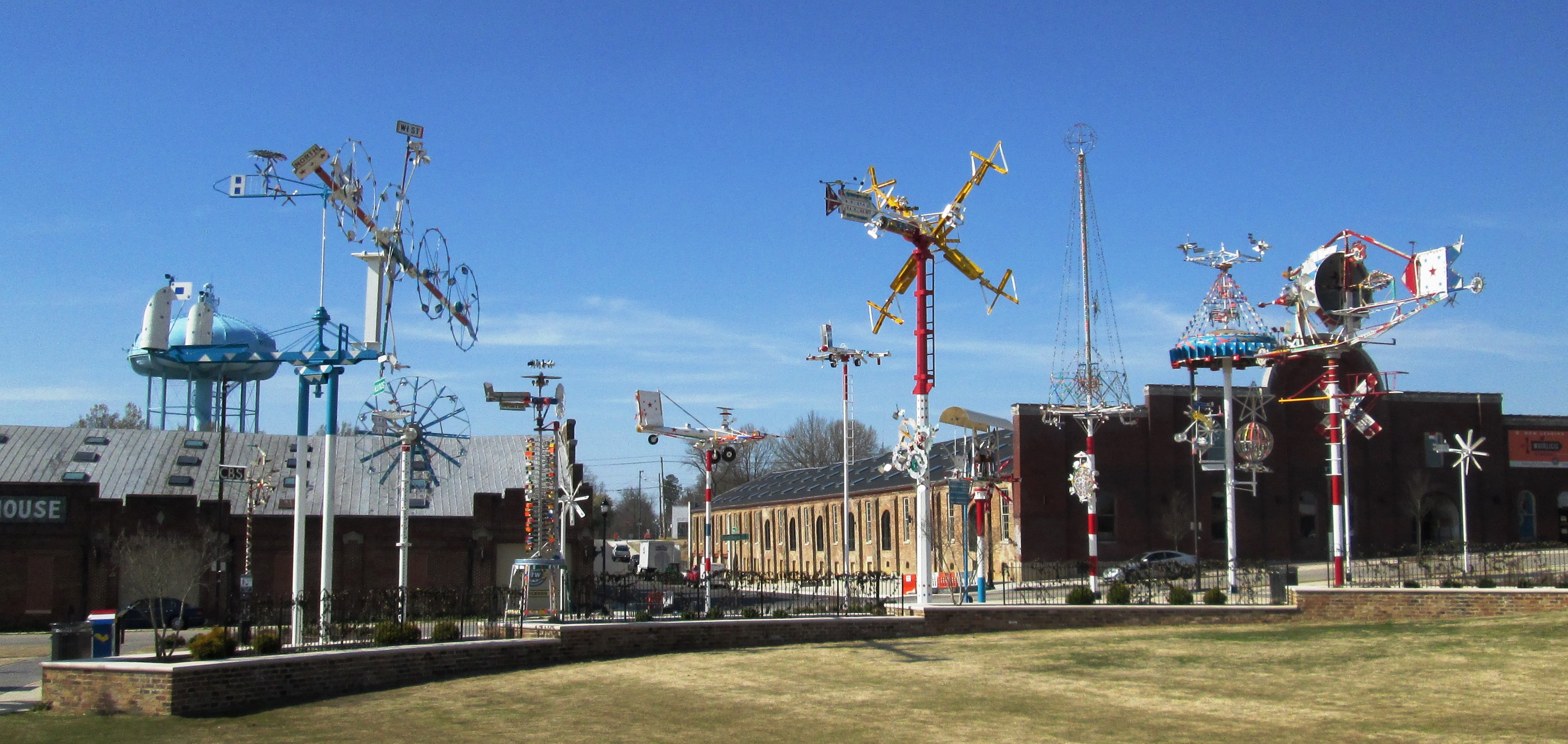
Whirligig Park in Wilson

Wilson is the home of the Vollis Simpson Whirligig Park, an Outsider Art installation. Simpson specialized in large kinetic sculptures called "whirligigs", which Simpson made from salvaged metal. Simpson became nationally known after he was commissioned to create a whirligig for the American Visionary Art Museum in Baltimore. The 55-foot (17 m) high, 45-foot (14 m) wide whirligig called "Life, Liberty and the Pursuit of Happiness" was installed for the museum's opening in November, 1995. Other of Simpson's whirligigs have been exhibited at the American Folk Art Museum in New York City and at the Abby Aldrich Rockefeller Folk Art Museum in Williamsburg, Virginia. Whirligig Park opened in Wilson in late 2017.

== Government ==
Wilson has a City Council-City Manager form of government. The City Council includes seven members who are elected by single-member districts and a mayor who is elected at-large. All terms are four years. The City Council makes policy and budget decisions. It appoints a city manager and staff to implement its decisions and operate the city's daily affairs.

Elected continuously since 1992, C. Bruce Rose was the longest-serving mayor in the city's history. Prior to his election, he served as a city firefighter for 30 years and fire chief for seven years.

As of November 5, 2019, Carlton Stevens, JR. was elected as Mayor of Wilson, N.C. Mayor Stevens is a native of Wilson and is also co-owner of Stevens Funeral Home, alongside his Mother (Carol).

== Education ==
=== Public schools ===
==== Elementary schools ====
- Wells
- Margaret Hearne
- Vick
- New Hope
- Vinson-Bynum
- B.O. Barnes
- Winstead
- Frederick Douglass (Formerly Elm City)
- Stantonsburg
- Lee Woodard
- Lucama
- Rock Ridge
- Gardners
- Jones

==== Middle schools ====
- C H Darden
- Forest Hills Middle
- Toisnot
- Elm City
- Speight
- Springfield

==== High schools ====
- E. T. Beddingfield High School
- Ralph L. Fike High School
- James B. Hunt High School
- Wilson Early College Academy
- Wilson Academy of Applied Technology
- Wilson Preparatory Academy

==== Alternative schools ====
- Daniels Learning Center (6-8).

=== Charter schools ===
Youth Enrichment Program of Wilson, Inc. operates Sallie B. Howard School for the Arts and Education which is named after Sallie Baldwin Howard. Wilson Preparatory Academy also serves Wilson and surrounding counties as a charter school.

=== State-operated schools ===
The Eastern North Carolina School for the Deaf is operated by the North Carolina Department of Health and Human Services Office of Education Services.

=== Private schools ===
Wilson is home to several private schools:

- Community Christian School (Daycare - Pre-K -12)
- Garnett Christian Academy
- Wilson Christian Academy (Daycare - Pre-K -12)
- Greenfield School (Pre-K-12) (non-sectarian)
- Charis Prep (Christian, 9-12)

=== Colleges ===
- Barton College
- Wilson Community College

== Media ==
Wilson's chief source of print journalism is the Wilson Times, established in 1896. Broadcast network television stations (ABC, CBS, NBC, and FOX Affiliates), are based in Raleigh, North Carolina and include Wilson in their market.

== Infrastructure ==
=== Telecommunications ===
The city has built its own Government-access television (GATV) municipal cable TV provider known as Greenlight, which provides cable TV, digital phone and internet to its residents. Greenlight was formed in 2008 to provide an independent, locally owned and operated option for television, telephone and Internet broadband connectivity for Wilson residents. Since then, Greenlight has grown to provide services to more than 6,000 residential customers and businesses and the Wilson County School System. In addition, Greenlight provides free wireless Internet access throughout the downtown Wilson area. In 2013 Wilson was the first city in North Carolina to offer gigabit Internet connectivity service to its residents via a fiber optic network. That service allows Internet users to upload or download data at speeds up to one billion bits per second. However, North Carolina state law has prevented the expansion of Wilson's municipal network to nearby communities that have requested connections, and that restriction was upheld in the 2016 circuit court ruling Tennessee v. FCC.

=== Transportation ===
Wilson is served by two airports: Wilson Industrial Airport and Rocky Mount-Wilson Airport (RWI), and by the Wilson Amtrak Station.

The following highways travel through Wilson: I-95, I-587, I-795, US 301, US 264, US 117, NC 42, and NC 58. Five-lane roads include Hines Street, Tarboro Street, and Ward Boulevard.

RIDE is the City of Wilson's on-demand micro-transit service. RIDE replaced the fixed route bus system on September 1, 2020. RIDE is a partnership between the City of Wilson and Via, a leader in micro-transit service.

=== Healthcare ===
Wilson Medical Center is a 330-bed hospital.

== Notable people ==
- Jamareo Artis, musician and bass player
- Cora Lily Woodard Aycock (1868–1952), First Lady of North Carolina and President of the North Carolina Railroad
- Red Barrett (1915–1990) was a pitcher who played eleven career seasons in the National League
- Glenn Bass (born 1939) is a former collegiate and professional American football player.
- Hunter Bell is an author and actor. Bell was born in Alabama and raised in Wilson.
- G. K. Butterfield (born 1947) was the U.S. representative for North Carolina's 1st congressional district from 2004-2022
- Jean Farmer-Butterfield is a Democratic member of the North Carolina General Assembly
- Freddie Bynum (born 1980), a former shortstop who played parts of four seasons with three Major League teams.
- Ben Flowers (1927–2009) was raised in Wilson and played for four Major League teams.
- Jentezen Franklin is Senior Pastor at Free Chapel in Gainesville, Georgia
- Celeste Gold Broughton (1925–2022), writer and socialite.
- Daisy Hendley Gold (1893–1975), journalist and author.
- Pleasant Daniel Gold (1833–1920), American publisher and clergyman
- James B. Hunt, Jr. He was elected governor of North Carolina, serving a record four terms.
- Martha Hunt (born 1989) American fashion model.
- Izel Jenkins (born 1964) Football player with the Philadelphia Eagles, Minnesota Vikings, and New York Giants.
- Thomas Kenan (1838–1911) Confederate soldier and later a politician
- Ike Lassiter (born 1940) is a former American football defensive lineman.
- Walt McKeel (born 1972) is a former professional baseball player.
- Louis B. Meyer (1933–1999) was a North Carolina jurist
- Ed Mitchell (born 1948/1949), barbecue pitmaster and businessman
- Naomi E. Morris (1921–1986) was a jurist who served on the North Carolina Court of Appeals
- Miguel A. Núñez, Jr. (born 1964) is an American actor.
- Vance Page (1905–1951) was a pitcher for the Chicago Cubs from 1938 to 1941.
- Stan Partenheimer [Party] (1922–1989) was a pitcher for the Boston Red Sox and St. Louis Cardinals.
- Julius Peppers (born 1980) is an American retired football outside linebacker/defensive end for the Carolina Panthers
- Randy Renfrow (born 1958) is a former NASCAR driver in the Craftsman Truck Series before retiring.
- Corey Thomas (born 1975) is a former professional American football wide receiver
- Gregory Walcott was born Bernard Mattox in Wendell, North Carolina. He appeared as a drill instructor in the film Battle Cry
- John Webb (1926–2008) was an American jurist who served as an Associate Justice of the North Carolina Supreme Court (1986–1998).
- Harry F. Weyher Jr. (1921–2002) was an American lawyer and president of the Pioneer Fund from 1958 to 2002.
- John E. Woodard (1855–1928), mayor of Wilson, state delegate and state senator

== See also ==
- List of municipalities in North Carolina
- List of places named after people in the United States
- National Register of Historic Places listings in Wilson County, North Carolina
