= Wilson County Courthouse (North Carolina) =

Historic courthouse in North Carolina, US

- U.S. National Register of Historic Places
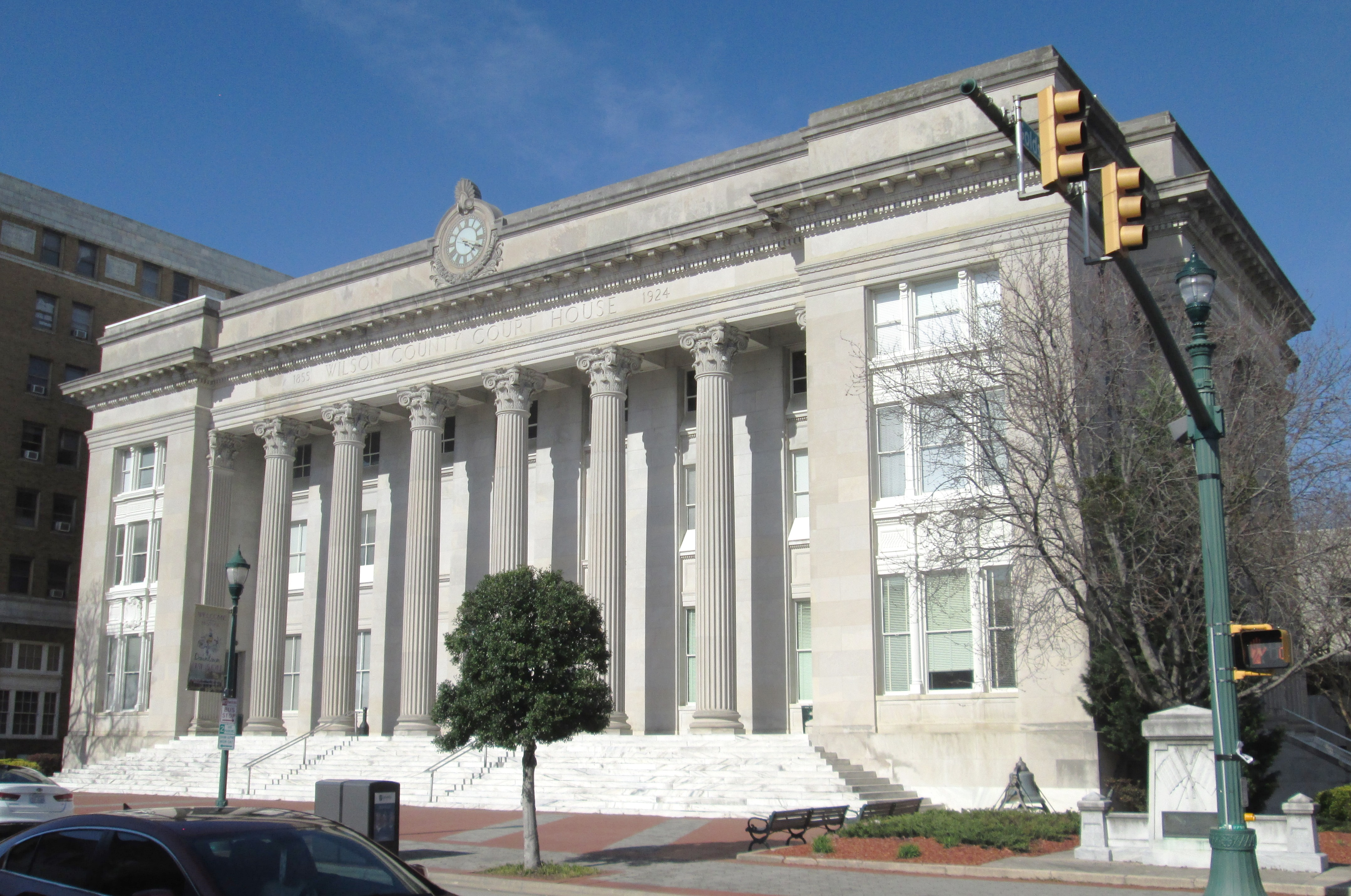

- Location within North Carolina Location within the United States
- Interactive map showing the location of Wilson County Courthouse
- Location: 115 Nash St. E. Wilson, North Carolina
- Coordinates: 35.725474°N 77.910279°W
- Built: 1924-1925
- Built by: William P. Rose
- Architect: Fred A. Bishop
- Architectural style: Classical Revival
- MPS: North Carolina County Courthouses TR
- NRHP reference No.: 79001765
- Added to NRHP: May 10, 1979

The Wilson County Courthouse is a historic courthouse located in Wilson, North Carolina. It was built in 1924–1925, and is a three-story, rectangular, Classical Revival style brick building. It features Corinthian order porticos in antis.

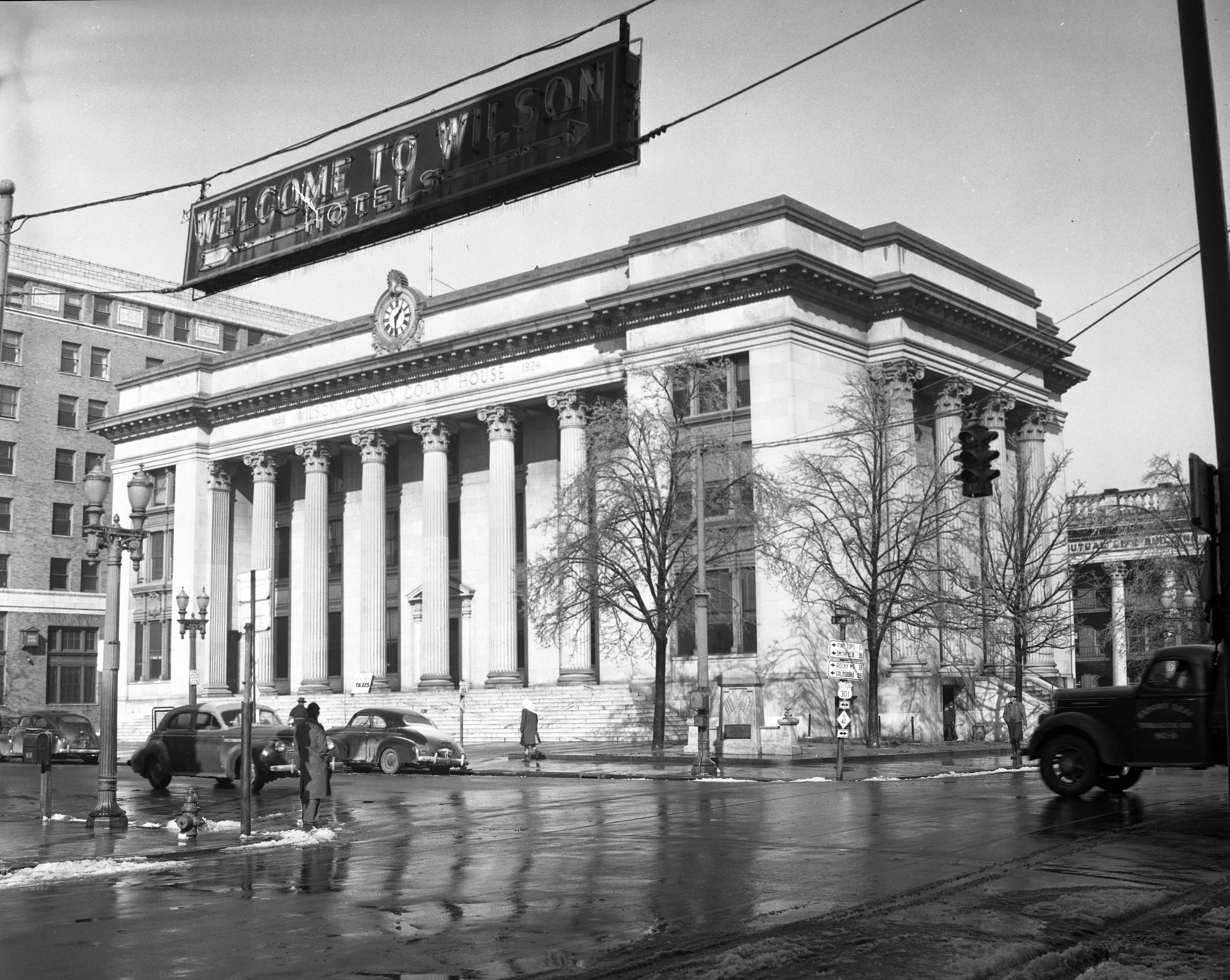
The courthouse in 1946

It was listed on the National Register of Historic Places in 1979, and is located within the Wilson Central Business-Tobacco Warehouse Historic District.
