= Wilson County, North Carolina =

County in North Carolina, United States

- County
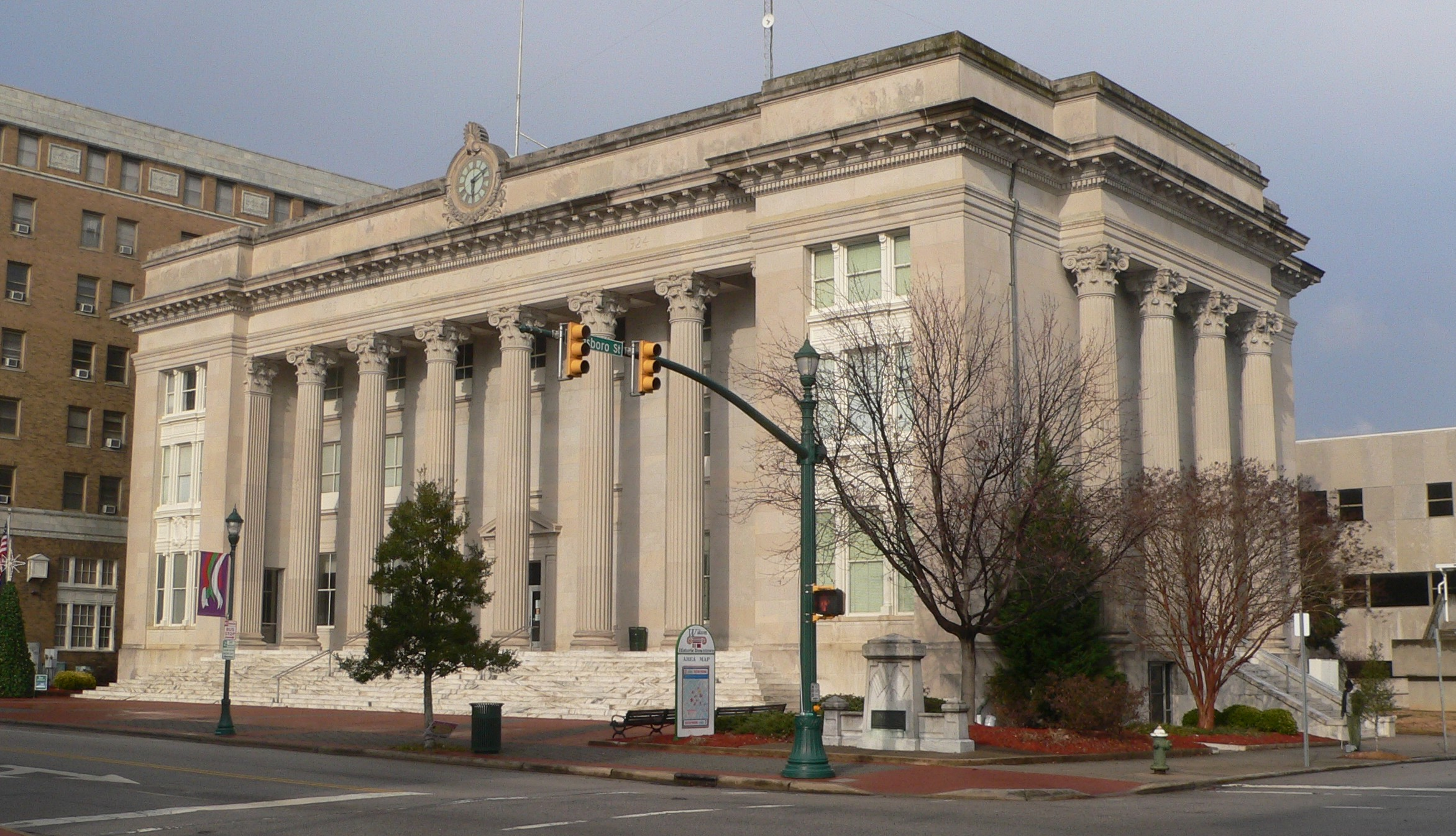
- Wilson County Courthouse

- Seal Logo

- Location within the U.S. state of North Carolina
- Coordinates: 35.70°N 77.92°W
- Country: United States
- State: North Carolina
- Founded: 1855
- Named for: Col. Louis D. Wilson
- Seat: Wilson
- Largest community: Wilson

Area
  - Total: 373.10 sq mi (966.3 km^{2})
  - Land: 367.57 sq mi (952.0 km^{2})
  - Water: 5.53 sq mi (14.3 km^{2}) 1.48%

Population (2020)
  - Total: 78,784
  - Estimate (2025): 81,150 ▲
  - Density: 214.34/sq mi (82.756/km^{2})
- Time zone: UTC−5 (Eastern)
  - Summer (DST): UTC−4 (EDT)
- ZIP Codes: 27542, 27557, 27803, 27807, 27813, 27822, 27829, 27830, 27851, 27852, 27873, 27878, 27880, 27883, 27888, 27893, 27895, 27896
- Area code: 252
- Congressional district: 1st
- Website: www.wilsoncountync.gov

Wilson County is a county located in the U.S. state of North Carolina. As of the 2020 census, its population was 78,784. The county seat is Wilson. The county comprises the Wilson, NC micropolitan statistical area, which is also included within the Rocky Mount-Wilson-Roanoke Rapids, NC combined statistical area.

== History ==
On February 13, 1855, the North Carolina General Assembly established Wilson County from parts of Edgecombe, Johnston, Nash, and Wayne Counties. The county was named for Colonel Louis D. Wilson, a U.S. Volunteers soldier, who died of yellow fever while on leave from the state senate during the Mexican–American War.

Wilson Speedway held 12 NASCAR Cup Series races at the county fairgrounds in Wilson between 1951 and 1960. The half-mile dirt track operated between 1934 and 1989.

== Geography ==
Interactive map of Wilson County

According to the U.S. Census Bureau, the county has a total area of 373.10 square miles (966.3 km^{2}), of which 5.53 square miles (14.3 km^{2}) (1.48%) are covered by water.

=== State and local protected site ===
- Tobacco Farm Life Museum

=== Major water bodies ===
- Black Creek
- Buckhorn Reservoir
- Contentnea Creek
- Lake Wilson
- Silver Lake
- Wiggins Mill Reservoir

=== Adjacent counties ===
- Nash County – north
- Edgecombe County – northeast
- Pitt County – east
- Greene County – southeast
- Wayne County – south
- Johnston County – southwest

=== Major highways ===
- I-95
- I-587 / Future I-587 (small section undesignated)
- I-795
- US 117
- US 264
- US 264 Alt.
- US 301
- NC 42
- NC 58
- NC 111
- NC 222
- NC 581

=== Major infrastructure ===
- Amtrak Thruway (Wilson Station)
- Wilson Industrial Air Center
- Wilson Station

== Demographics ==
Historical population
Census	Pop.	Note	%±
1860	9,720		—
1870	12,258		26.1%
1880	16,064		31.0%
1890	18,644		16.1%
1900	23,596		26.6%
1910	28,269		19.8%
1920	36,813		30.2%
1930	44,914		22.0%
1940	50,219		11.8%
1950	54,506		8.5%
1960	57,716		5.9%
1970	57,486		−0.4%
1980	63,132		9.8%
1990	66,061		4.6%
2000	73,814		11.7%
2010	81,234		10.1%
2020	78,784		−3.0%
2025 (est.)	81,150	▲	3.0%
U.S. Decennial Census; 1790–1960 1900–1990; 1990–2000 2010 2020

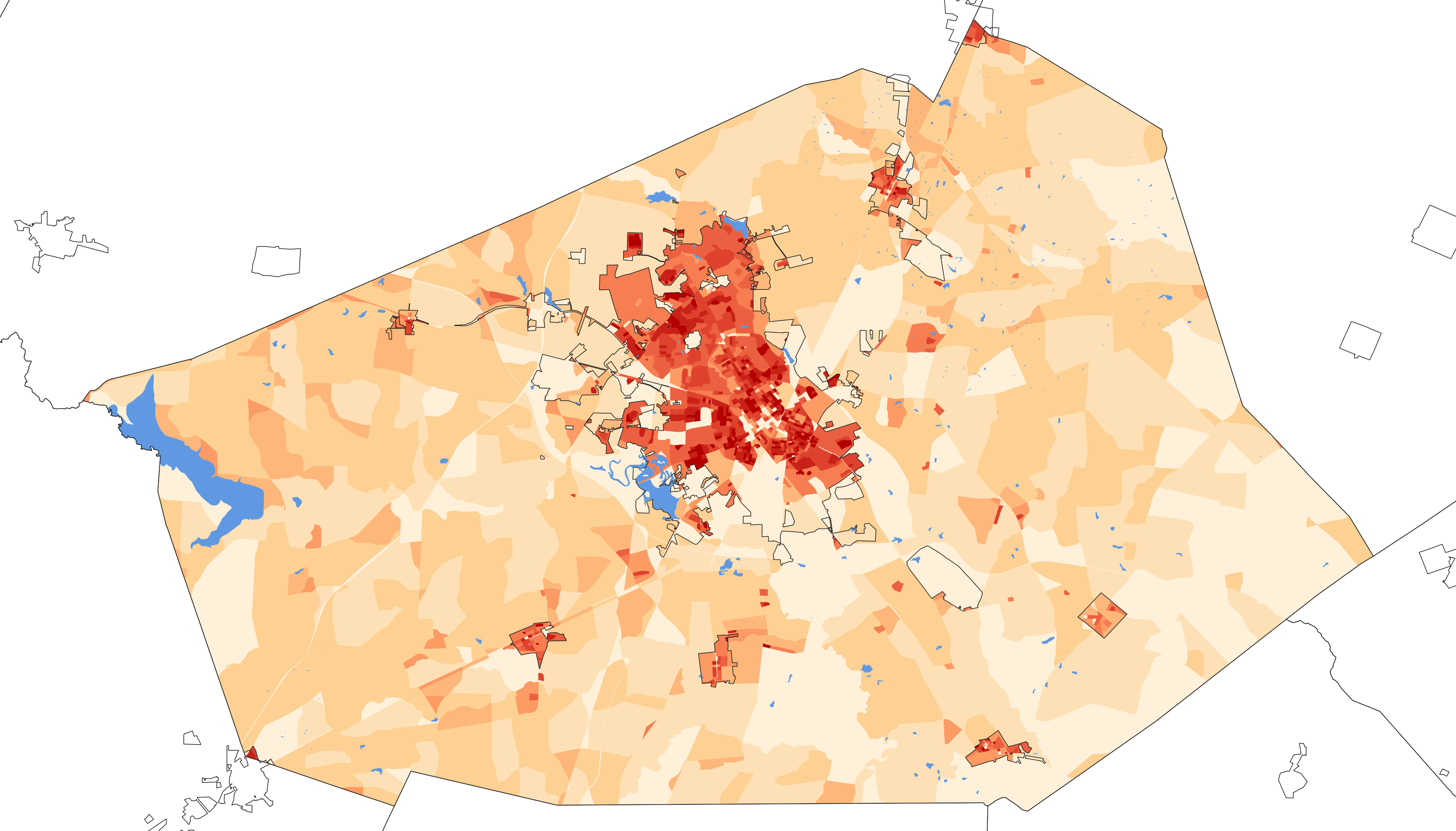
2020 population density of Wilson County NC by census block

=== Racial and ethnic composition ===
Wilson County, North Carolina – Racial and ethnic composition Note: the US Census treats Hispanic/Latino as an ethnic category. This table excludes Latinos from the racial categories and assigns them to a separate category. Hispanics/Latinos may be of any race.
Race / Ethnicity (NH = Non-Hispanic)	Pop 1980	Pop 1990	Pop 2000	Pop 2010	Pop 2020	% 1980	% 1990	% 2000	% 2010	% 2020
White alone (NH)	39,775	40,461	39,498	40,157	36,106	63.00%	61.25%	53.51%	49.43%	45.83%
Black or African American alone (NH)	22,611	24,817	28,886	31,462	29,842	35.82%	37.57%	39.13%	38.73%	37.88%
Native American or Alaska Native alone (NH)	37	63	144	190	239	0.06%	0.10%	0.20%	0.23%	0.30%
Asian alone (NH)	98	163	286	664	900	0.16%	0.25%	0.39%	0.82%	1.14%
Native Hawaiian or Pacific Islander alone (NH)	x	x	14	22	10	x	x	0.02%	0.03%	0.01%
Other race alone (NH)	27	20	50	108	257	0.04%	0.03%	0.07%	0.13%	0.33%
Multiracial (NH)	x	x	479	907	2,406	x	x	0.65%	1.12%	3.05%
Hispanic or Latino (any race)	584	537	4,457	7,724	9,024	0.93%	0.81%	6.04%	9.51%	11.45%
Total	63,132	66,061	73,814	81,234	78,784	100.00%	100.00%	100.00%	100.00%	100.00%

=== 2020 census ===
As of the 2020 census, 78,784 people, 32,222 households, and 19,760 families were residing in the county. The population density was 199 people per square mile (77 people/km^{2}).

The median age was 41.9 years; 22.5% of the residents were under 18 and 19.7% were 65 or older. For every 100 females, there were 90.2 males, and for every 100 females 18 and over, there were 86.8 males 18 and over.

The racial makeup of the county was 47.4% White, 38.2% Black or African American, 0.6% American Indian and Alaska Native, 1.1% Asian, <0.1% Native Hawaiian and Pacific Islander, 7.2% from some other race, and 5.4% from two or more races. Hispanic or Latino residents of any race comprised 11.5% of the population.

About 62.1% of the residents lived in urban areas, while 37.9% lived in rural areas.

Of the 32,222 households in the county, 29.2% had children under 18 living in them, 41.0% were married-couple households, 18.8% were households with a male householder and no spouse or partner present, and 34.8% were households with a female householder and no spouse or partner present. About 31.1% of all households were made up of individuals, and 14.3% had someone living alone who was 65 or older.

The county had 36,252 housing units, of which 11.1% were vacant. Among occupied housing units, 60.1% were owner-occupied and 39.9% were renter-occupied. The homeowner vacancy rate was 1.2%, and the rental vacancy rate was 5.8%.

=== 2000 census ===
At the 2000 census, of the 28,613 households, 31.9% had children under 18 living with them, 48.1% were married couples living together, 16.5% had a female householder with no husband present, and 30.9% were not families. About 26.4% of all households were made up of individuals, and 10.2% had someone living alone who was 65 or older. The average household size was 2.51, and the average family size was 3.03.

The age distribution was 25.6% under 18, 9.1% from 18 to 24, 28.8% from 25 to 44, 23.6% from 45 to 64, and 12.9% who were 65 or older. The median age was 36 years. For every 100 females, there were 91.30 males. For every 100 females 18 and over, there were 87.20 males.

The median income in the county for a household was $33,116 and for a family was $41,551. Males had a median income of $30,364 versus $21,997 for females. The per capita income for the county was $17,102. About 13.8% of families and 18.5% of the population were below the poverty line, including 24.7% of those under 18 and 21.3% of those 65 or over.

== Government and politics ==
Wilson County government is a member of the regional Upper Coastal Plain Council of Governments. It has several law-enforcement agencies:

- Wilson County Sheriff's Office
- Wilson Police Department (City of Wilson)
- Stantonsburg Police Department (Town of Stantonsburg)
- Black Creek Police Department (Town of Black Creek)
- Sharpsburg Police Department (Town of Sharpsburg)

United States presidential election results for Wilson County, North Carolina
Year	Republican		Democratic		Third party(ies)	
Year	No.	%	No.	%	No.	%
1912	82	3.44%	1,741	73.03%	561	23.53%
1916	730	26.24%	2,052	73.76%	0	0.00%
1920	1,374	28.21%	3,496	71.79%	0	0.00%
1924	574	17.53%	2,619	79.99%	81	2.47%
1928	1,933	35.35%	3,535	64.65%	0	0.00%
1932	517	7.69%	6,153	91.55%	51	0.76%
1936	549	6.80%	7,522	93.20%	0	0.00%
1940	584	6.87%	7,912	93.13%	0	0.00%
1944	769	10.61%	6,480	89.39%	0	0.00%
1948	665	9.55%	6,008	86.25%	293	4.21%
1952	2,569	22.83%	8,684	77.17%	0	0.00%
1956	2,830	25.36%	8,328	74.64%	0	0.00%
1960	3,114	27.97%	8,021	72.03%	0	0.00%
1964	5,002	40.87%	7,238	59.13%	0	0.00%
1968	4,053	25.13%	4,173	25.87%	7,903	49.00%
1972	12,060	73.04%	4,166	25.23%	286	1.73%
1976	6,795	45.05%	8,209	54.42%	80	0.53%
1980	8,329	49.86%	8,042	48.14%	333	1.99%
1984	12,243	59.31%	8,343	40.42%	57	0.28%
1988	10,997	57.11%	8,214	42.65%	46	0.24%
1992	10,176	44.36%	10,105	44.06%	2,656	11.58%
1996	10,518	49.03%	9,779	45.59%	1,154	5.38%
2000	13,466	54.24%	11,266	45.38%	94	0.38%
2004	16,264	53.26%	14,206	46.52%	65	0.21%
2008	17,375	46.72%	19,652	52.84%	164	0.44%
2012	17,954	45.91%	20,875	53.38%	280	0.72%
2016	17,531	45.97%	19,663	51.56%	941	2.47%
2020	19,581	48.07%	20,754	50.95%	400	0.98%
2024	19,750	49.32%	19,909	49.72%	386	0.96%

== Communities ==
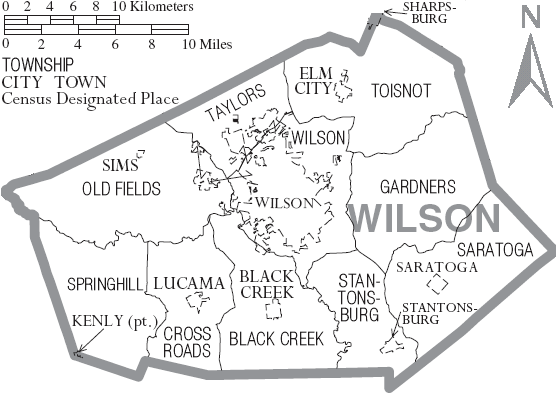
Map of Wilson County with municipal and township labels

=== City ===
- Wilson (county seat and largest community)

=== Towns ===
- Black Creek
- Elm City
- Kenly (part)
- Lucama
- Saratoga
- Sims
- Stantonsburg
- Sharpsburg (part)

=== Townships ===
- Black Creek
- Cross Roads
- Gardners
- Old Fields
- Saratoga
- Springhill
- Stantonsburg
- Taylors
- Toisnot
- Wilson

=== Unincorporated communities ===
- Montclair
- New Hope
- Rock Ridge
- Lamms Crossroads

== See also ==
- List of counties in North Carolina
- National Register of Historic Places listings in Wilson County, North Carolina
- List of places named after people in the United States
- Rocky Mount–Wilson Regional Airport, airport north of the county in Nash County
