= Thompson House =

Thompson House may refer to:

== In Canada ==
- Thompson House (Montreal), a residence in the historic Îlot-Trafalgar-Gleneagles block in Montreal
- Thomson House, a former mansion in Montreal, now the graduate students building at McGill University

== In Thailand ==
- Jim Thompson House, a museum in Bangkok

== In the United States ==
- N.Q. and Virginia M. Thompson House, Citronelle, Alabama
- Glenn-Thompson Plantation, Pittsview, Alabama
- Thompson House (Stevens Creek, Arkansas)
- Thompson Ranch, Cottonwood, Arizona
- Thompson, Boyce, Southwestern Arboretum, Superior, Arizona, listed on the NRHP in Arizona
- C. E. Thompson General Store and House, Arkadelphia, Arkansas
- Henry-Thompson House, Bentonville, Arkansas
- Ada Thompson Memorial Home, Little Rock, Arkansas
- William H. Thompson Farmstead, East Windsor, Connecticut
- Jewett-Thompson House, Fort Myers, Florida
- Gaylord Thompson House, Lewiston, Idaho
- James S. Thompson House, New Boston, Illinois
- Anderson-Thompson House, Indianapolis, Indiana
- William N. Thompson House, Indianapolis, Indiana
- Dr. George W. Thompson House, Winamac, Indiana
- Charles J. Thompson House, Forest City, Iowa
- Sen. William H. Thompson House, Garden City, Kansas
- Tobias-Thompson Complex, Geneseo, Kansas
- Thompson House (Eminence, Kentucky), listed on the NRHP in Kentucky
- James Thompson House (Anchorage, Kentucky)
- Sutfield-Thompson House, Harrodsburg, Kentucky, listed on the NRHP in Kentucky
- Thompson, Smith, Log House, Lancaster, Kentucky, listed on the NRHP in Kentucky
- John Henry Thompson House, Millersburg, Kentucky, listed on the NRHP in Kentucky
- John T. Thompson House, Newport, Kentucky
- William Thompson House (Perryville, Kentucky), listed on the NRHP in Kentucky
- Dr. Thompson House, Springfield, Kentucky, listed on the NRHP in Kentucky
- Thompson House (Jackson, Louisiana), listed on the NRHP in Louisiana
- Thompson Icehouse, South Bristol, Maine
- Abijah Thompson House, Winchester, Massachusetts
- Johnson-Thompson House, Winchester, Massachusetts
- Benjamin Thompson House, Woburn, Massachusetts
- Thompson Home, Detroit, Michigan
- Gamaliel Thompson House, Hudson, Michigan
- Hannah C. and Peter E. Thompson House, Barnesville, Minnesota, listed on the NRHP in Minnesota
- Thompson-Fasbender House, Hastings, Minnesota
- Thompson Summer House, Minnetonka Beach, Minnesota
- James Young Thompson House, Amory, Mississippi, listed on the NRHP in Mississippi
- Lampton-Thompson-Bourne House, Columbia, Mississippi, listed on the NRHP in Mississippi
- June and Nora Thompson House, New Hebron, Mississippi, listed on the NRHP in Mississippi
- George Thompson House, Pascagoula, Mississippi, listed on the NRHP in Mississippi
- Thompson-Campbell Farmstead, Langdon, Missouri
- Thompson-Brown-Sandusky House, St. Joseph, Missouri
- Thompson Hall (University of New Hampshire), Durham, New Hampshire
- David Thompson House, Mendham, New Jersey, listed on the NRHP in New Jersey
- Thompson, Daniel, and Ryle, John, Houses, Paterson, New Jersey, listed on the NRHP in New Jersey
- Thompson House (Woodbury, New Jersey)
- Alexander Thompson House, Crawford, New York
- Robert A. Thompson House, Crawford, New York
- Walter Thompson House and Carriage House, Philipstown, New York
- Andrew Thompson Farmstead, Pine Bush, New York
- Thompson House (Poughkeepsie, New York)
- Thompson House (Setauket, New York)
- Henry Dwight Thompson House, Westfield, New York
- W. B. Thompson Mansion, Yonkers, New York
- Cowper-Thompson House, Murfreesboro, North Carolina
- Thompson, Alfred and Martha Jane, House and Williams Barn, New Hope, North Carolina, listed on the NRHP in North Carolina
- Long, James A. and Laura Thompson, House, Roxboro, North Carolina, listed on the NRHP in North Carolina
- James Monroe Thompson House, Saxapahaw, North Carolina
- Ward-Applewhite-Thompson House, Stantonsburg, North Carolina
- Thompson House (Wake Forest, North Carolina)
- Thompson-Builder House, Dublin P.O., Ohio, listed on the NRHP in Ohio
- Cassius Clark Thompson House, East Liverpool, Ohio
- Bailey-Thompson House, Georgetown, Ohio
- Thompson-Bullock House, Georgetown, Ohio, listed on the NRHP in Ohio
- Mother Thompson House, Hillsboro, Ohio, listed on the NRHP in Ohio
- Enoch Thompson House, Mount Vernon, Ohio, listed on the NRHP in Ohio
- Joseph M. Thompson House, Tahlequah, Oklahoma, listed on the NRHP in Oklahoma
- Clark Thompson House, Cascade Locks, Oregon, listed on the NRHP in Oregon
- Ries–Thompson House, Parkdale, Oregon, listed on the NRHP in Oregon
- John L. Thompson House, The Dalles, Oregon
- Thomas H. Thompson House, Brownsville, Pennsylvania
- Thayer-Thompson House, Erie, Pennsylvania
- S. R. Thompson House, New Wilmington, Pennsylvania
- John Thompson House (Richboro, Pennsylvania)
- Gen. John Thompson House, State College, Pennsylvania
- Thompson Cottage, West Chester, Pennsylvania
- Thompson House (Springfield, South Dakota), listed on the NRHP in South Dakota
- William Thompson House (Camden, Tennessee)
- Thompson-Brown House, Maryville, Tennessee, listed on the NRHP in Tennessee
- Absalom Thompson House, Spring Hill, Tennessee
- Billow-Thompson House, Cuero, Texas, listed on the NRHP in Texas
- Thompson House (McKinney, Texas), listed on the NRHP in Texas
- D. H. Thompson House, Waxahachie, Texas, listed on the NRHP in Texas
- Mary I. Thompson House, Beaver, Utah, listed on the NRHP in Utah
- W. O. Thompson House, Beaver, Utah, listed on the NRHP in Utah
- William Thompson House (Beaver, Utah), listed on the NRHP in Utah
- William Thompson, Jr., House, Beaver, Utah
- Thompson-Hansen House, Brigham City, Utah
- Thompson, Niels and Mary Ann Fitzgerald, House, Sandy, Utah, listed on the NRHP in Utah
- Dabney-Thompson House, Charlottesville, Virginia
- George Oscar Thompson House, Tazewell, Virginia
- Albert W. Thompson Hall, Pullman, Washington, listed on the NRHP in Washington
- Will H. Thompson House, Seattle, Washington, listed on the NRHP in Washington
- Thompson House Hotel, Baraboo, Wisconsin
- Erick J. Thompson House, New Richmond, Wisconsin
- Thomas Henry Thompson House, St. Croix Falls, Wisconsin

== See also ==
- James Thompson House (disambiguation)
- John Thompson House (disambiguation)
- William Thompson House (disambiguation)
- Thompson Farm (disambiguation)
- Thompson School (disambiguation)
