= Thompson Farm =

Thompson Farm, Thompson Farmstead, or Thompson Barn may refer to:

in the United States

(by state)

- Thompson Ranch, Cottonwood, Arizona, listed on the NRHP in Yavapai County, Arizona
- William H. Thompson Farmstead, East Windsor, Connecticut, listed on the NRHP in Hartford County, Connecticut
- Thompson-Wohlschlegel Round Barn, Harper, Kansas, listed on the NRHP in Kansas
- Thompson-Campbell Farmstead, Langdon, Missouri, listed on the NRHP in Missouri
- Andrew Thompson Farmstead, Pine Bush, New York, listed on the NRHP in Orange County, New York
- Alfred and Martha Jane Thompson House and Williams Barn, New Hope, NC, listed on the NRHP in North Carolina
- Thompson Farm (Georgetown, Ohio), listed on the NRHP in Ohio
- Thompson Farm (New London, Pennsylvania), listed on the NRHP in Pennsylvania
- Thompson Farmstead (Dell Rapids, South Dakota), listed on the NRHP in South Dakota

== See also ==
- Thompson House (disambiguation)
