= Applewhite =

Applewhite is a surname. Notable people with the surname include:

- Antwan Applewhite (born 1985), American football player
- Ashton Applewhite (born 1952), American writer and activist
- Charlie Applewhite (1932–2001), American singer
- James Applewhite (born 1935), American poet
- Major Applewhite (born 1978), American football coach
- Marshall Applewhite (1931–1997), American cult leader

Fictional characters:

- Betty Applewhite, Desperate Housewives character

== See also ==
- Surviving the Applewhites, novel
- Isaac Applewhite House, historic site
- Ward-Applewhite-Thompson House, historic site
- W. H. Applewhite House, historic site
