= William Thompson House =

William Thompson House may refer to:

- William H. Thompson Farmstead, East Windsor, Connecticut, listed on the NRHP in Hartford County, Connecticut
- William N. Thompson House, Indianapolis, Indiana, listed on the NRHP in Marion County, Indiana
- William Thompson House (Perryville, Kentucky), listed on the NRHP in Kentucky
- William Thompson House (Camden, Tennessee), listed on the NRHP in Tennessee
- William Thompson House (Beaver, Utah), listed on the NRHP in Utah
- Will H. Thompson House, Seattle, Washington, listed on the NRHP in Washington

== See also ==
- Thompson House (disambiguation)
- William Thompson (disambiguation)
