= James Thompson House =

James Thompson House

- James S. Thompson House, New Boston, Illinois, listed on the NRHP in Mercer County, Illinois
- James Thompson House (Anchorage, Kentucky), listed on the NRHP in Kentucky
- James Young Thompson House, Amory, Mississippi, listed on the NRHP in Monroe County, Mississippi
- James Monroe Thompson House, Saxapahaw, North Carolina, listed on the NRHP in Alamance County, North Carolina

== See also ==
- Thompson House (disambiguation)
