= John Thompson House =

John Thompson House may refer to:

- John Henry Thompson House, Millersburg, Kentucky, listed on the National Register of Historic Places
- John Thompson House (Highland, New York), listed on the National Register of Historic Places
- John L. Thompson House, The Dalles, Oregon
- John Thompson House (Richboro, Pennsylvania)

== See also ==
- Thompson House (disambiguation)
