= YMCA (East Liverpool, Ohio) =

- U.S. National Register of Historic Places
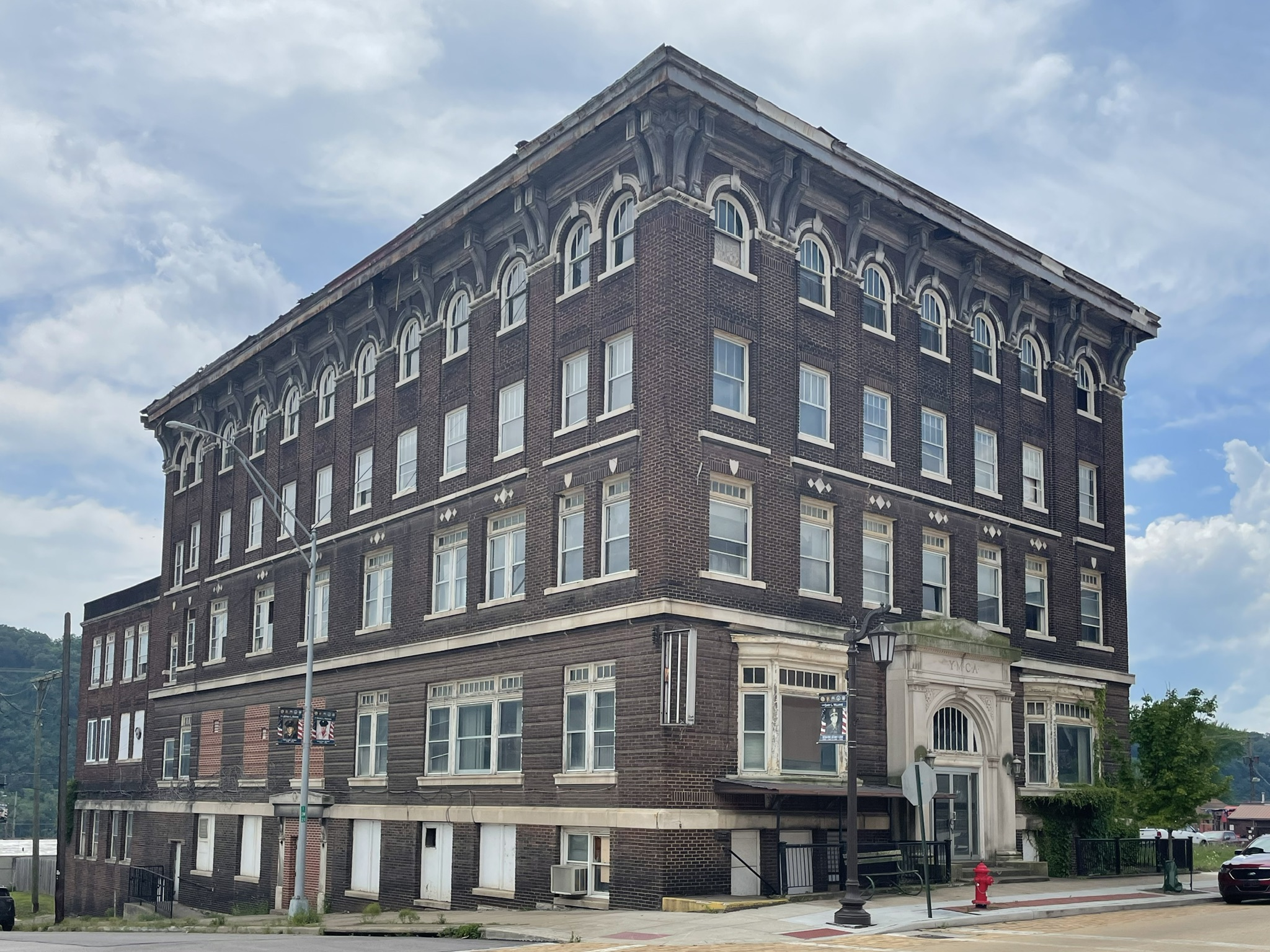

- Location within Ohio Location within the United States
- Location: Washington and Fourth St., East Liverpool, Ohio
- Coordinates: 40°37′4″N 80°34′45″W
- Area: less than one acre
- Built: 1913
- Architect: Metsch, Cassius
- Architectural style: Classical Revival
- MPS: East Liverpool Central Business District MRA
- NRHP reference No.: 85003509
- Added to NRHP: November 14, 1985

The YMCA in East Liverpool, Ohio was built in 1913 in Classical Revival style. It was listed on the National Register of Historic Places in 1985.

It was one of many properties addressed in a study assessing historic resources in East Liverpool's central business district, a study that resulted in the NRHP listing of several historic districts and buildings (including also Masonic Temple (East Liverpool, Ohio), Elks Club (East Liverpool, Ohio), and Odd Fellows Temple (East Liverpool, Ohio)).
