= Hampton Hill (disambiguation) =

Hampton Hill may refer to:

== United States ==
- Hampton Hill Historic District, Connecticut
- Hampton Hill (Richboro, Pennsylvania), a historic house in Bucks County

== England ==
- Hampton Hill, Hannington, Swindon, Wiltshire
- Hampton Hill, London
