= Godwin–Knowles House =

Historic house in Ohio, United States

- U.S. National Register of Historic Places
- U.S. Historic district – Contributing property
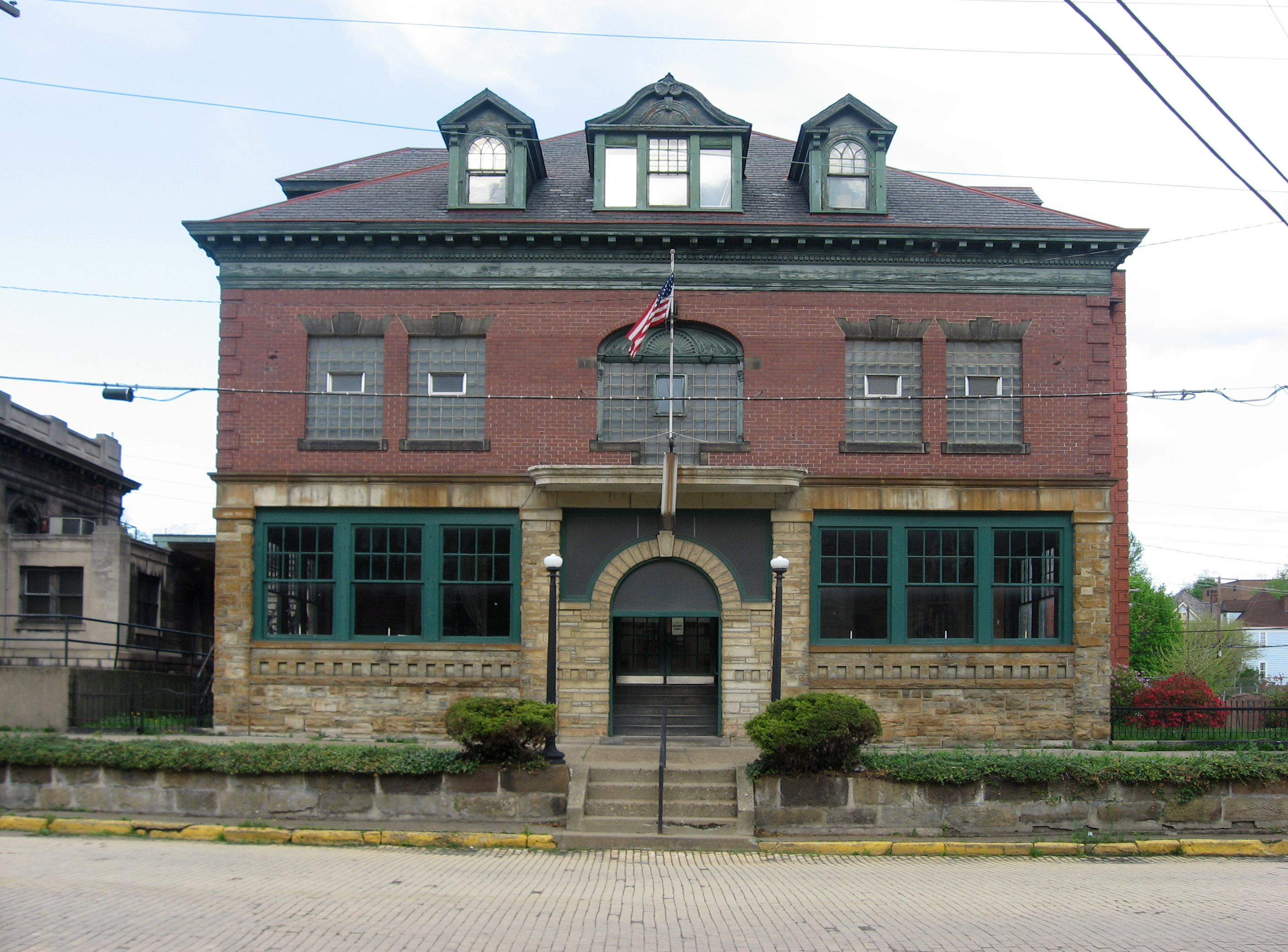
- Front of the house

- Location within Ohio Location within the United States
- Location: 422 Broadway, East Liverpool, Ohio
- Coordinates: 40°37′3″N 80°34′38″W
- Area: less than one acre
- Built: 1890
- Architectural style: Colonial Revival
- Part of: East Liverpool Downtown Historic District (ID83001985)
- MPS: East Liverpool Central Business District MRA
- NRHP reference No.: 85003515
- Added to NRHP: November 14, 1985

The Godwin–Knowles House (also known as the "Masonic Temple") is a historic former house in downtown East Liverpool, Ohio, United States. A Colonial Revival structure built in 1890, it has played important roles in both the city's industry and in its society.

The house was constructed for a Mr. Goodwin, a leader in the pottery industry. At this time, pottery was the dominant industry in East Liverpool, with potters beginning to exploit favorable types of clay soil in the 1830s, and several decades later, it was a deep part of the city's identity as well as its economy. Like most buildings in the city's central business district, the house is a masonry structure: its foundation is stone, and its walls are built primarily of brick.

After Goodwin left the house, it became the home of his nephew, Homer Knowles, who was likewise a major figure in the city's pottery industry. Knowles only lived in the house for a short time, selling it to the city's Masonic lodge in 1910. Soon after buying the house, the Masons modified the house for their purposes: they enclosed the front porch and expanded the overall facade of the building to provide more interior room for their meetings. These modifications were carried out in the spirit of the original construction: the same types of materials were used as when the house was erected, and additions such as the extended roof and new dormers were built to appear identical to the original features.

In 1985, the Godwin–Knowles House was listed on the National Register of Historic Places, due to its significance in local history. Due to the care exercised by the Masons in their 1910s renovations and few changes after that date, it closely resembles the grand mansion constructed in 1890. Many other downtown East Liverpool buildings were added to the Register at the same time as part of a multiple property submission. Among them were lodge buildings for two other fraternal organizations: the Elks Club and the Odd Fellows Temple. Sixteen years later, much of the city's downtown was designated the East Liverpool Downtown Historic District; the Godwin–Knowles House was named one of its contributing properties.
