= Thompson Ridge, New York =

Thompson Ridge
- Hamlet
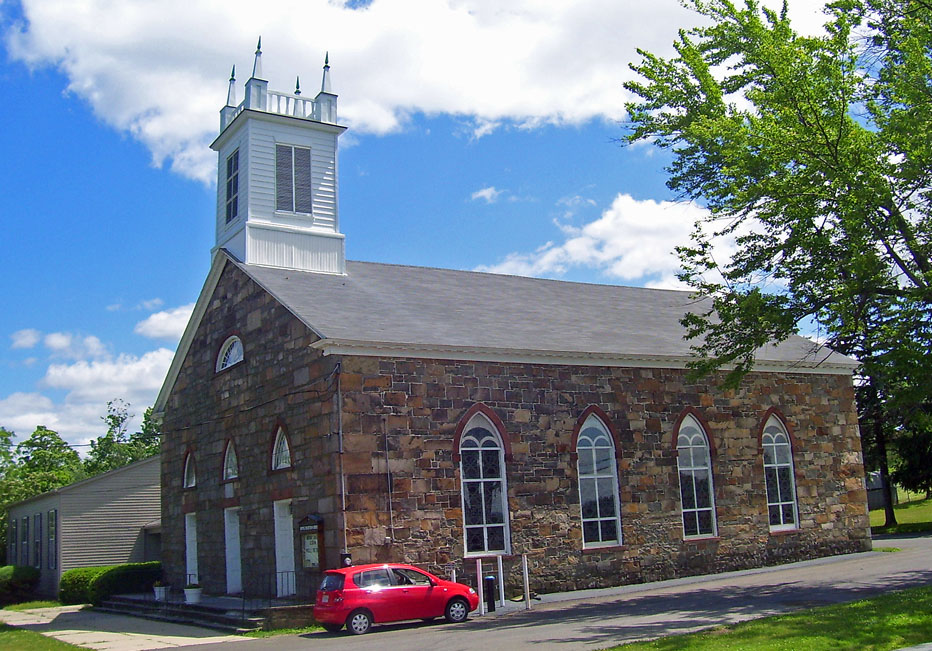
- The Hopewell Presbyterian Church, a Registered Historic Place at the junction of Route 302 and Thompson Ridge Road.

- Location within New York
- Coordinates: 41°34′N 74°19′W
- Country: United States
- State: New York
- County: Orange
- Time zone: UTC-5 (Eastern (EST))
  - Summer (DST): UTC-4 (EDT)
- ZIP Code: 10985

Thompson Ridge is a hamlet located within the town of Crawford, New York. The hamlet is served by a United States Post Office with the ZIP Code 10985. Thompson Ridge is located along NY 302 south of Pine Bush, Crawford's main population center.

It takes its name from the Thompson family, early settlers of the region. The houses of Alexander, Andrew and Robert Thompson still stand along 302.

Much of Thompson Ridge is elevated, providing sweeping views of the Shawangunk Ridge over the valley of the Shawangunk Kill. A small downtown section, including the post office, is along Thompson Ridge Road just east of its junction with 302.
