= James Applewhite =

American poet and creative writing professor

James Applewhite (born 1935 in Stantonsburg, North Carolina) is an American poet and a retired Professor Emeritus in creative writing at Duke University.

He graduated from Duke University with a B.A., M.A. and Ph.D. His work has appeared in Harper's. His papers are held at Duke University.

He lives with his wife in Durham, North Carolina.

== Awards ==
He is a 1976 Guggenheim Fellow. He won the 1998 Brockman-Campbell Award from the North Carolina Poetry Society. He won the Jean Stein Award in Poetry, by the American Academy of Arts and Letters. In 2008, he was inducted into the North Carolina Literary Hall of Fame.

== Works ==
- Leon Stokesbury, ed. (1999). "My Grandfather's Funeral". The made thing: an anthology of contemporary Southern poetry. University of Arkansas Press. p. 16. ISBN 978-1-55728-579-9.
- Daytime and Starlight. LSU Press. 1997. ISBN 978-0-8071-2150-4.
- River Writing: An Eno Journal (1st ed.). Princeton University Press. 1988. ISBN 9780691067261. Selected by critic Harold Bloom for inclusion in his Western Canon.
- "Interstate Highway" (2002), poets.org
- Quartet for Three Voices. LSU Press. 2002. ISBN 978-0-8071-2774-2.
- A Diary of Altered Light. LSU Press. 2006. ISBN 978-0-8071-3127-5.
- Selected Poems. Duke Press. 2005. ISBN 978-0-8223-3639-6.
