= Cassius Clark Thompson House =

Historic house in Ohio, United States

- U.S. National Register of Historic Places
- U.S. Historic district – Contributing property
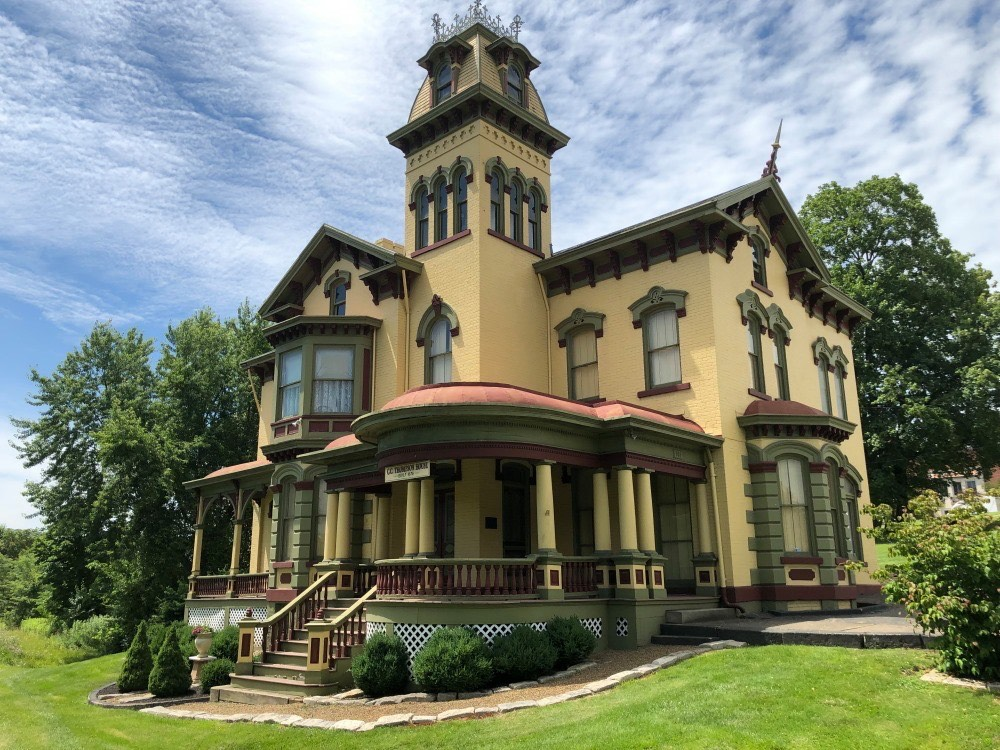
- Front of the house

- Location within Ohio Location within the United States
- Location: 305 Walnut St., East Liverpool, Ohio
- Coordinates: 40°36′59″N 80°34′34″W
- Area: Less than 1 acre (0.40 ha)
- Built: 1876
- Architectural style: Late Victorian, Italianate
- Part of: East Liverpool Downtown Historic District (ID83001985)
- NRHP reference No.: 71000637
- Added to NRHP: September 28, 1971

The Cassius Clark Thompson House is a historic residence on the edge of downtown East Liverpool, Ohio, United States. Built in 1876 in a Late Victorian form of the Italianate style of architecture, it was built as the home of one of East Liverpool's leading businessmen.

Born in 1851, Cassius Clark Thompson was a major player in East Liverpool's dominant pottery industry; he was the owner of a prosperous pottery firm that had been founded in 1868. Intending to build himself a house, he purchased a hillside lot on the southeastern edge of downtown, finding the site's view of the nearby Ohio River highly attractive. The house that he constructed is a brick structure with elements of wood and stone, two-and-a-half stories tall. The dominant feature of its architecture is a large tower at the front of the house: measuring three stories tall, it is crowned with an ornate wrought iron railing.

In 1971, the Thompson House was listed on the National Register of Historic Places; it was the second of forty-four Columbiana County properties so to be designated, following only the Beginning Point of the U.S. Public Land Survey, which marks the county's border with Beaver County, Pennsylvania. It qualified for inclusion on the Register both because of its historically significant architecture and because of its close connection to one of the area's most significant historical figures. Nearly twenty other individual buildings and historic districts in East Liverpool have since been added to the Register. Most recent of these new additions is the East Liverpool Downtown Historic District: when it was designated in 2001, it was composed of more than one hundred contributing properties, including the Thompson House.
