= Willow Mill Complex =

Historic complex in Pennsylvania, United States

- U.S. National Register of Historic Places
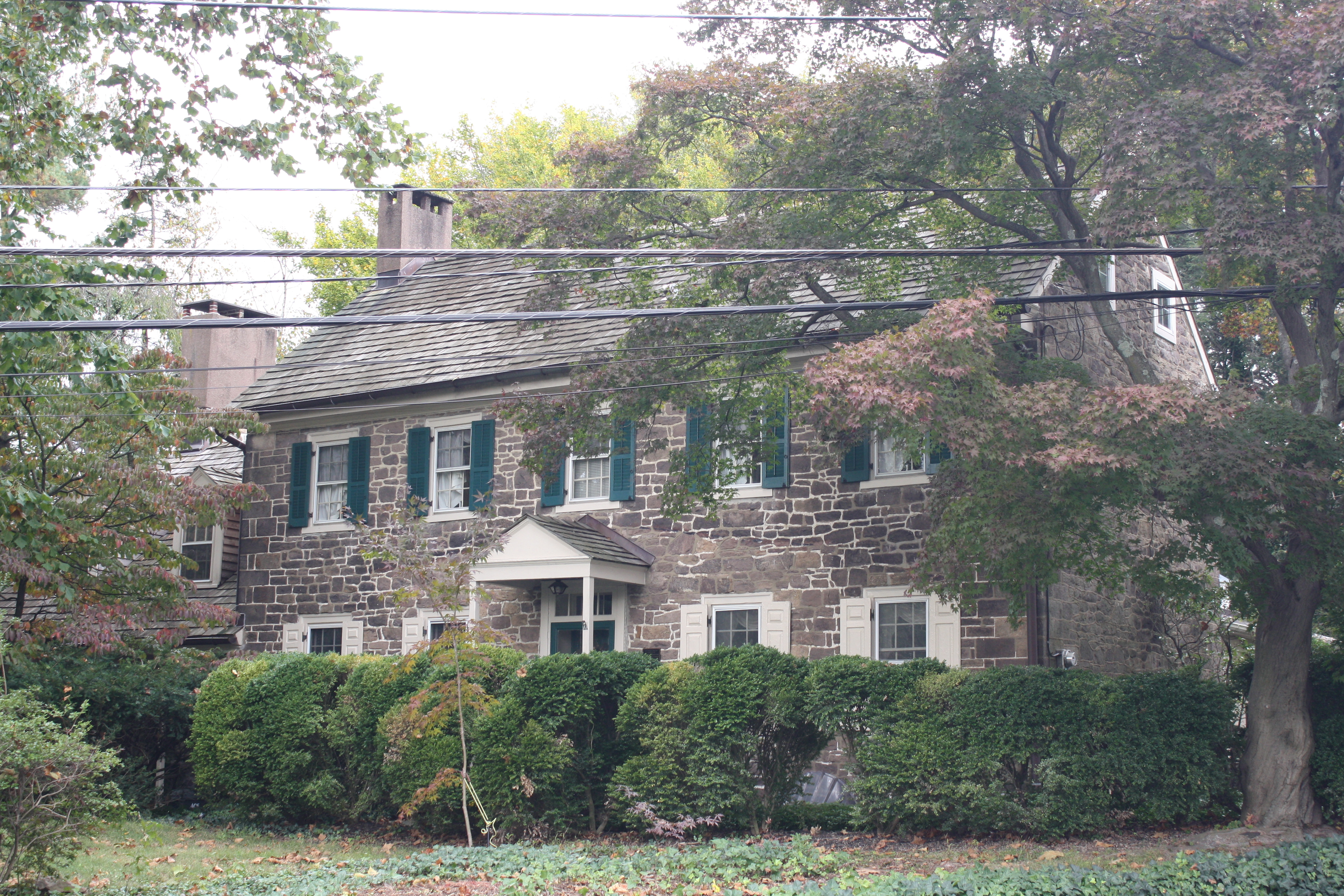
- Willow Mill. Shaw-Leedom House. October 2012.

- Location within Pennsylvania Location within the United States
- Location: 570, 559, and 569 Bustleton Pike, Richboro, Pennsylvania
- Coordinates: 40°11′58″N 75°0′38″W
- Area: 11.6 acres (4.7 ha)
- Built by: Shaw, Joseph; McKinney, Cornelius
- Architectural style: Federal
- NRHP reference No.: 02000476
- Added to NRHP: May 9, 2002

The Willow Mill Complex is a complex of historic buildings that is located in Richboro, Northampton Township, Bucks County, Pennsylvania.

It was added to the National Register of Historic Places in 2002.

== History and architectural features ==
This complex consists of the Shaw-Leedom House and spring house/smoke house and the Howard Sager House, wagon house, and grist mill.

The Shaw-Leedom House was built circa 1800, and is a 2 1/2-story, five-bay, stone dwelling with a gable roof that was designed in the Federal style. It has a 1 1/2-story, two-bay stone wing believed to be the kitchen wing from an earlier house. The adjacent stone spring/smoke house was also built circa 1800. The Willow Mill was built during the 1840s, and is a four-story stone building that was converted to residential use in 1938.

The Sager House was built in 1847, and is a 2 1/2-story, three-bay, ashlar stone building. It has a gable roof with dormers and shed roof "Dutch Stoop" kitchen wing. Associated with it is a two-story, frame wagon house that dates to the nineteenth century.

== Gallery ==
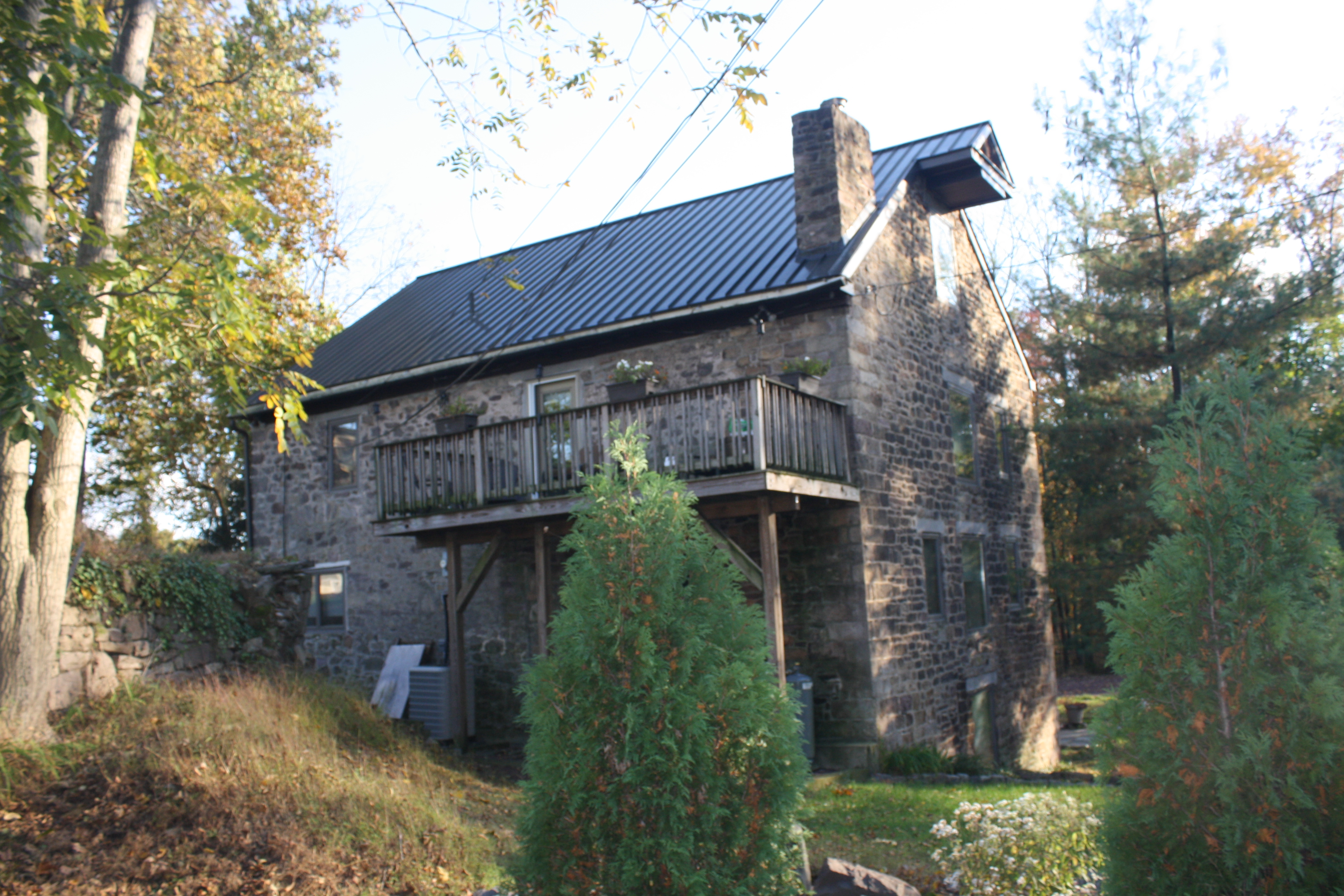
Former Grist Mill

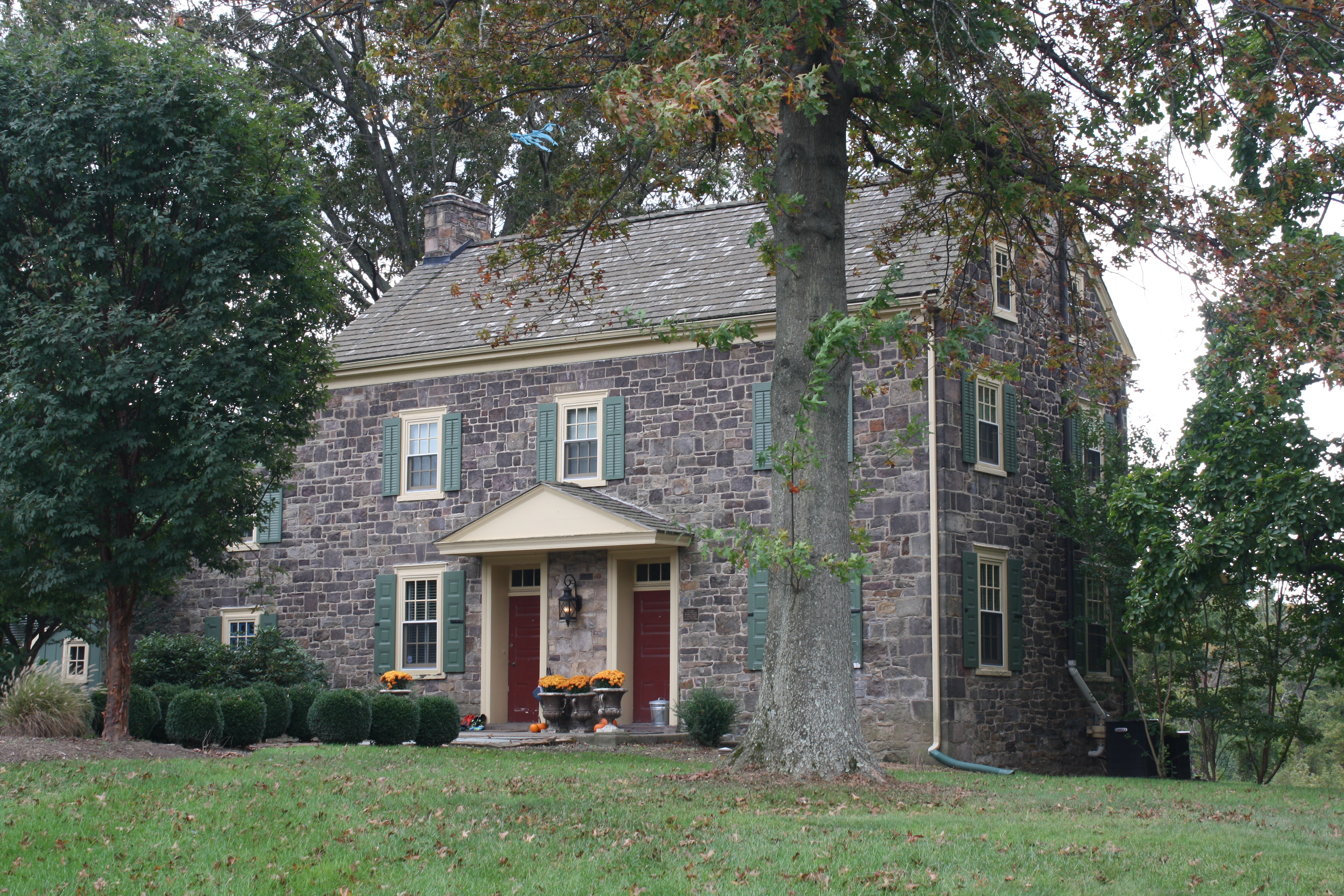
Sager House

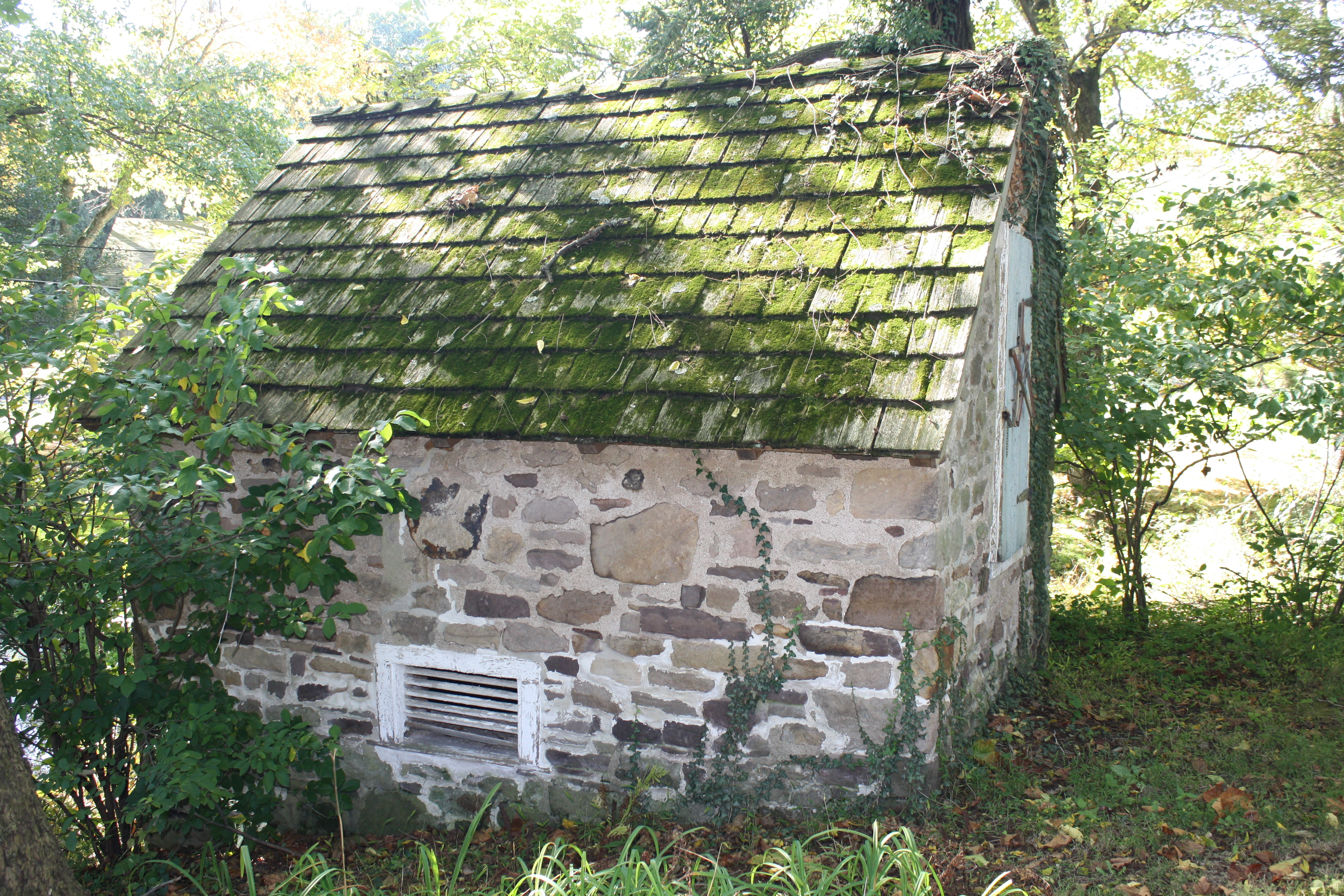
Spring House
