= Virginius Dabney =

American teacher, journalist, writer, and editor (1901–1995)

- Born: February 8, 1901; Charlottesville, Virginia, U.S.
- Died: December 28, 1995 (aged 94); Richmond, Virginia, U.S.
- Education: University of Virginia
- Occupations: Teacher, journalist, writer, editor
- Spouse: Douglas Harrison Chelf (m. 1923; died 1994)
- Children: 3
- Awards: Pulitzer Prize (1948)

Virginius Dabney (February 8, 1901 – December 28, 1995) was an American teacher, journalist, and writer, who edited the Richmond Times-Dispatch from 1936 to 1969 and wrote several historical books. Dabney won the Pulitzer Prize for editorial writing in 1948 due in part to his opposition to the poll tax. In his later years, he became the first Rector of Virginia Commonwealth University.

== Youth, education ==
Virginius Dabney was born on February 8, 1901, at the University of Virginia in Charlottesville, Virginia, where his father, Richard Heath Dabney, was a professor of history. His mother was a descendant of Thomas Jefferson. His paternal grandfather (also Virginius Dabney, 1835–1894) was a Confederate veteran and author of collections of tales about the Commonwealth.

Dabney graduated from Episcopal High School in Alexandria, Virginia. He then studied at the University of Virginia, where he was a brother in the Delta Kappa Epsilon fraternity (Eta chapter). He lived at the Dabney–Thompson House until his father sold that home in 1907.

== Teacher, journalist, editor ==
After teaching for a year at Episcopal High School in Alexandria, in 1922, Dabney went to work in Richmond, Virginia, as a journalist at The Richmond News Leader, which was then edited by Douglas S. Freeman. During this period he was also Virginia correspondent for the Baltimore Evening Sun, where he came to the attention of H. L. Mencken. In 1928, he left The News Leader for the Richmond Times-Dispatch, where he became Chief Editorial Writer in 1934, and editor in 1936. During his time with the Richmond Times-Dispatch Dabney also served as the Upper South correspondent for the New York Times.

As editor, Dabney was responsible for the editorial page. He editorialized against Adolf Hitler and in favor of wage and hour laws for women. He was, for his time, a progressive, and at times a liberal voice, opposing the Ku Klux Klan and the poll tax. He was not afraid to take on the Byrd Organization, a political machine of Governor (and later Senator) Harry F. Byrd that dominated Virginia's politics from the late 1920s until 1969. He was also known for opining on less-serious topics, such as the death of Ellen Glasgow's dog, and on the qualities of grits and mint juleps. He served on the Southern Policy Committee and the Southern Conference for Human Welfare. In 1948, he was awarded the Pulitzer Prize for editorial writing. He served as president of the American Society of Newspaper Editors in 1957–58. He was also a member of the Peabody Awards Board of Jurors from 1940 to 1942.

On March 1, 1952, Dabney guest starred on the CBS live variety show, Faye Emerson's Wonderful Town, in which hostess Faye Emerson visited Richmond to accent the kinds of music popular in the city.

In the 1950s, Dabney's editorials took on a more conservative tone. Although he was personally opposed to massive resistance against desegregation of Virginia's public schools, the owners of the Times-Dispatch did not allow him to editorialize against it. Offended by the student activists of the 1960s, Dabney was ambivalent about Martin Luther King Jr., whom he admired for his courage regarding the civil rights movement, but disdained for his "trouble-making" and what Dabney termed "unfair" attacks on the Vietnam War.

== Later years ==
Dabney retired from the Times-Dispatch in 1969, having agreed the previous year to become the first rector of Virginia Commonwealth University (created after the merger of the Medical College of Virginia and the Richmond Professional Institute), but he resigned after less than a year, in part because of protests from Afro-American students, although he remained on the governing board for many years and also wrote its history, Virginia Commonwealth University: A Sesquicentennial History (1987). Active in the Virginia Historical Society, Dabney served on its executive committee for three decades and as president from 1969 to 1972.

Dabney continued writing during his retirement. Receiving a Guggenheim Fellowship, he wrote Virginia: The New Dominion (1971, which became the state history textbook for years). His other books written during this time included Richmond: The Story of a City (1976), Across the Years: Memories of a Virginian (1978, his autobiography), Mr. Jefferson's University: A History (1981) and Pistols and Pointed Pens: The Dueling Editors of Old Virginia (1987). His most criticized book may have been The Jefferson Scandals, a Rebuttal (1981), which concerned the Sally Hemings allegations. Compilations of his newspaper columns were also published as The Last Review: The Confederate Reunion, Richmond, 1932 (1984) and Virginius Dabney's Virginia: Writings about the Old Dominion (1986).

== Personal life ==
Dabney married Douglas Harrison Chelf in 1923. They had two daughters. Dabney and his wife had been married for 69 years when she died in 1994. Dabney died the following year, in his sleep at his Richmond home on December 28, 1995, aged 94.

== Bibliography ==
The following are books by Virginius Dabney:

- The Patriots (editor)
- Liberalism in the South (1932)
- Below the Potomac (1943)
- Dry Messiah: The Life of Bishop Cannon (1949, a revised edition of an unpublished 1929 text)
- Virginia: The New Dominion (1971)
- Richmond: The Story of a City (1976)
- Across the Years: Memories of a Virginian (1978)
- Mr. Jefferson's University (1981)
- The Jefferson Scandals: A Rebuttal (1981)
- The Last Review: The Confederate Reunion, Richmond, 1932 (1984)
- Virginius Dabney's Virginia: Writings about the Old Dominion (1986)
- Virginia Commonwealth University: A Sesquicentennial History (1987)
- Pistols and Pointed Pens: The Dueling Editors of Old Virginia (1987)

The item following was by this author's grandfather of the same name:

- The Story of Don Miff: as told by his friend John Bouche Whacker (1886)
