= Hopewell Presbyterian Church (Crawford, New York) =

Historic church in New York, United States

- U.S. National Register of Historic Places
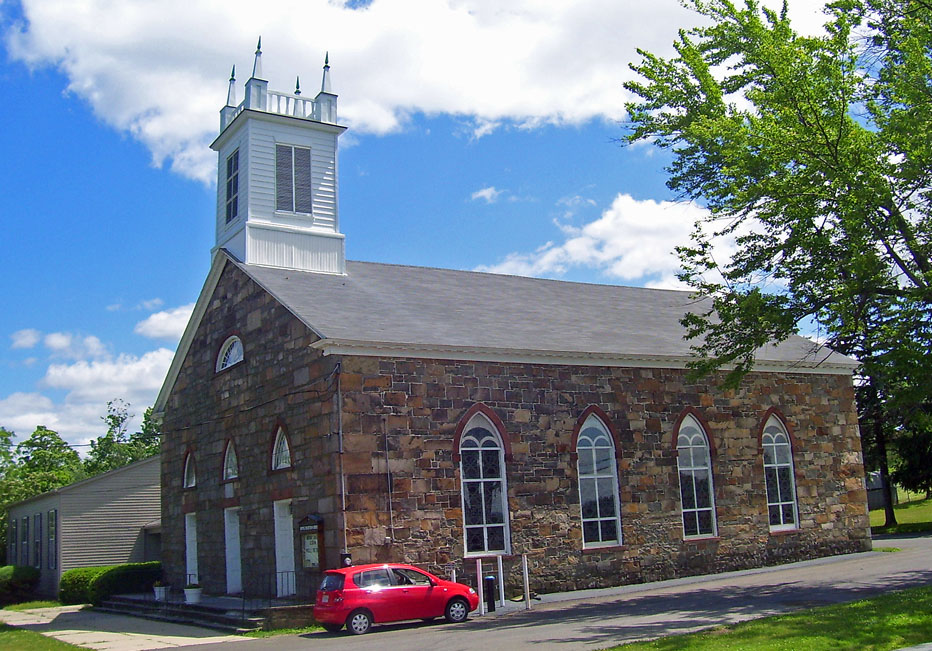
- The church from the west, with newer wing visible in background

- Location within New York Location within the United States
- Location: NY 302, at jct. of NY 17; Thompson Ridge, NY
- Nearest city: Middletown
- Coordinates: 41°34′14″N 74°20′08″W
- Area: 2.2 acres (0.89 ha)
- Built: 1831
- Built by: Corwin, John H.; Bull, Samuel
- Architectural style: Gothic Revival
- NRHP reference No.: 97001621
- Added to NRHP: January 7, 1998

The Hopewell Presbyterian Church is a historic Presbyterian church located at the junction of Thompson Ridge Road (Orange County Route 17) and NY 302 in the Thompson Ridge section of the Town of Crawford in Orange County, New York.

The church itself was established in 1778, in a stone building 1.5 miles (2.4 km) west of the present site. It moved to the current building, a stone Gothic revival building, in 1831. In 1968, an addition was built on the back.

In 1998 it was added to the National Register of Historic Places.
