= Edmondson-Woodward House =

Historic house in North Carolina, United States

- U.S. National Register of Historic Places
- Location within North Carolina Location within the United States
- Location: NC 58 and SR 1542, near Stantonsburg, North Carolina
- Coordinates: 35°39′08″N 77°49′57″W
- Area: 321 acres (130 ha)
- Built: c. 1830
- Architectural style: Federal
- MPS: Wilson MRA
- NRHP reference No.: 86000767
- Added to NRHP: February 13, 1986

Edmondson-Woodward House is a historic plantation house located near Stantonsburg, Wilson County, North Carolina. It was built about 1830, and is a two-story, three-bay, single pile, "L"-plan, Federal style frame dwelling. It has a two-story wing added in the mid-19th century, side gable roof, exterior end chimneys, and hipped-roof porch with flared columns.

It was listed on the National Register of Historic Places in 1986.
