= Thompson School =

Thompson School may refer to:

in the United States

(by state)

- Thompson School (Webster, Massachusetts), listed on the NRHP in Worcester County, Massachusetts
- Thompson Street School, New Bedford, Massachusetts, listed on the NRHP in Bristol County, Massachusetts
- Thompson School (Ethel, Mississippi), listed on the NRHP in Attala County, Mississippi

== See also ==
- Thompson House (disambiguation)
