= Twin Trees Farm =

Historic house in Pennsylvania, United States

- U.S. National Register of Historic Places
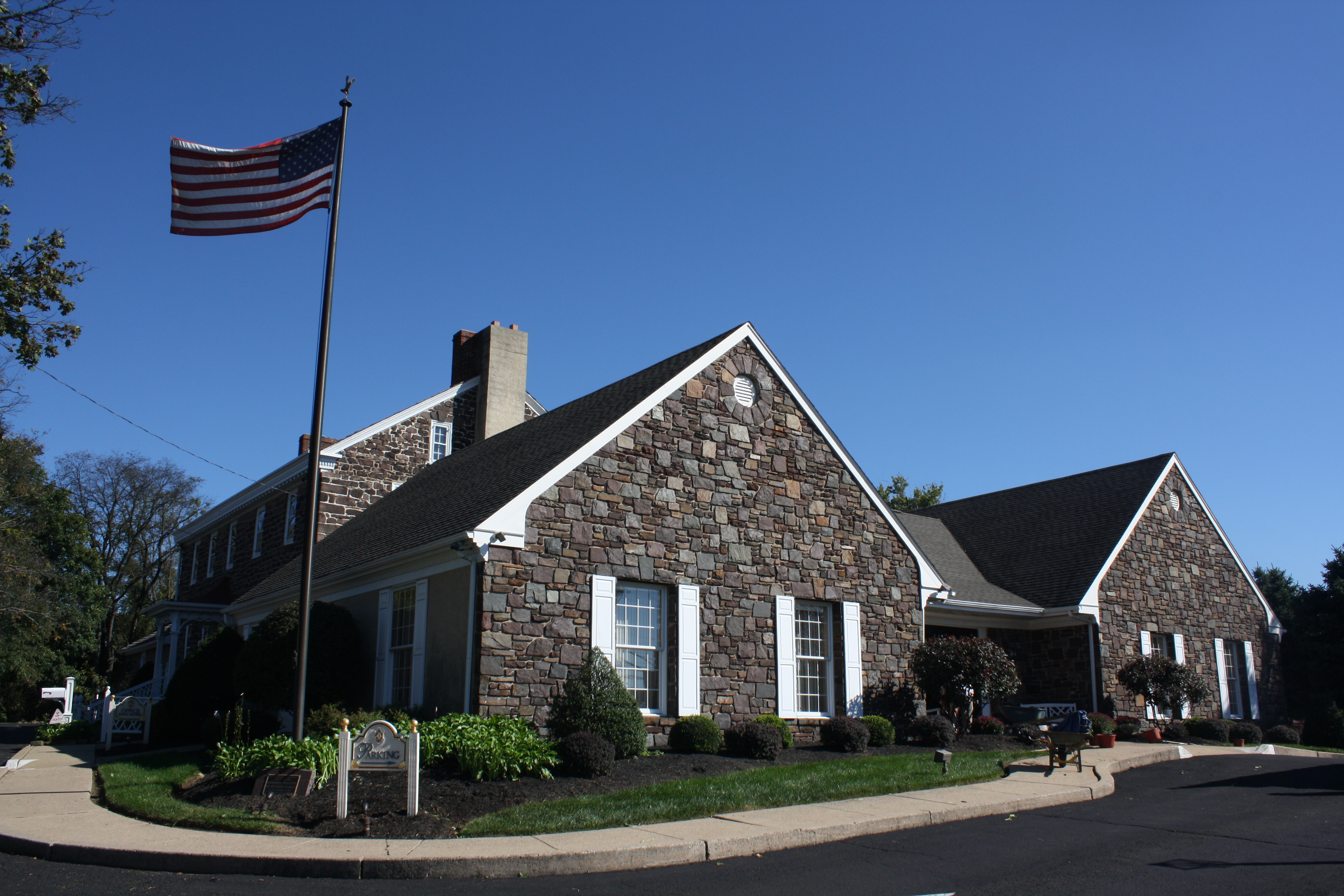
- Twin Trees Farm. October 2012.

- Location within Pennsylvania Location within the United States
- Location: 905 2nd St. Pike, Richboro, Pennsylvania
- Coordinates: 40°12′41″N 75°0′39″W
- Area: 1 acre (0.40 ha)
- Built: c. 1750, 1779
- Architectural style: Georgian
- NRHP reference No.: 75001623
- Added to NRHP: June 5, 1975

Twin Trees Farm is a historic home located at Richboro, Northampton Township, Bucks County, Pennsylvania. The first section was built about 1740–1760, and is a 1 1/2-story, one room rubble brownstone structure with an attic above. The larger section was built in 1779, and is a 2 1/2-story, five-bay, cut brownstone house in the Georgian style. The rear side is built of rubble fieldstone.

It was added to the National Register of Historic Places in 1975.

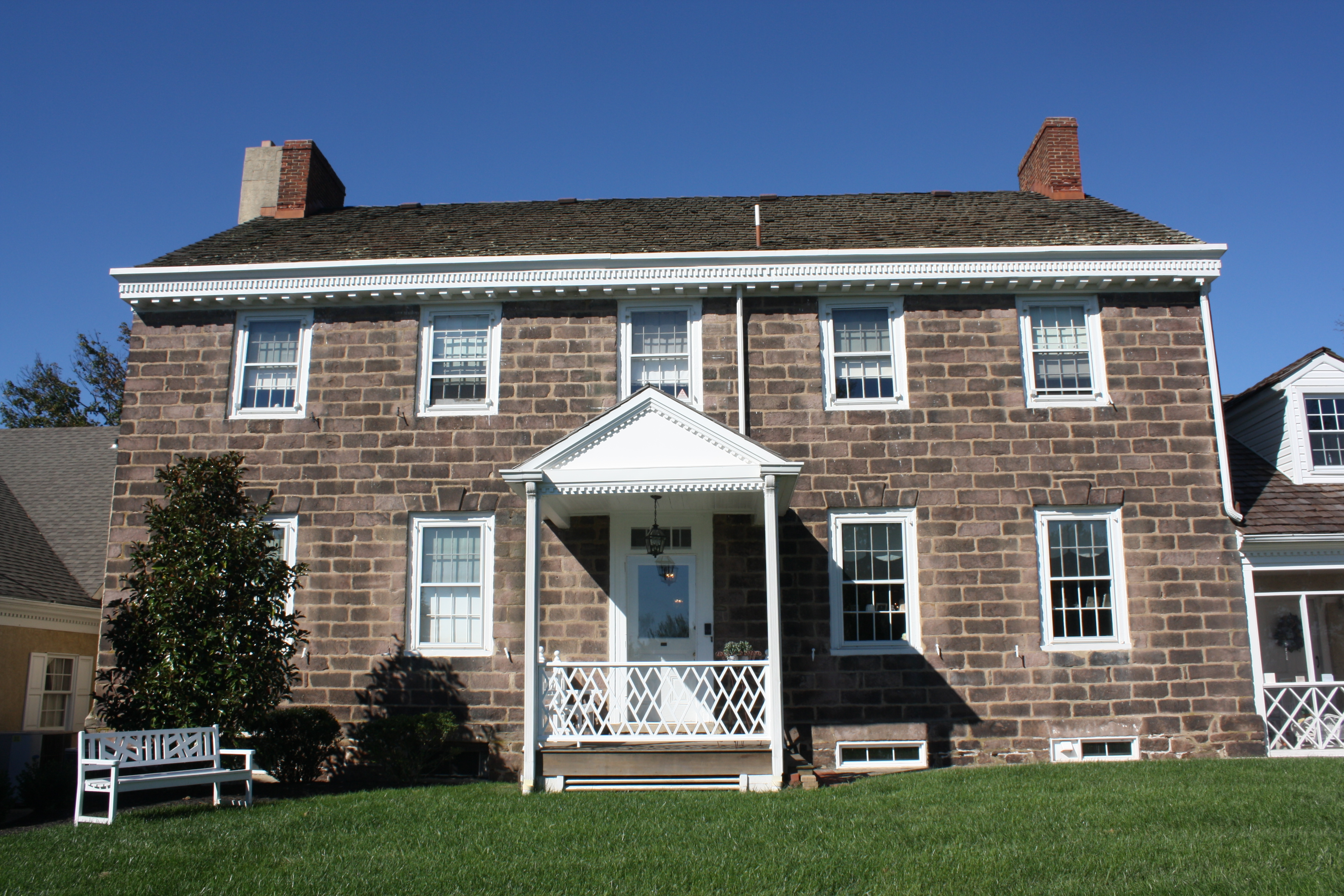
Section of Twin Trees Farm built in 1779.
