= Elks Club (East Liverpool, Ohio) =

- U.S. National Register of Historic Places
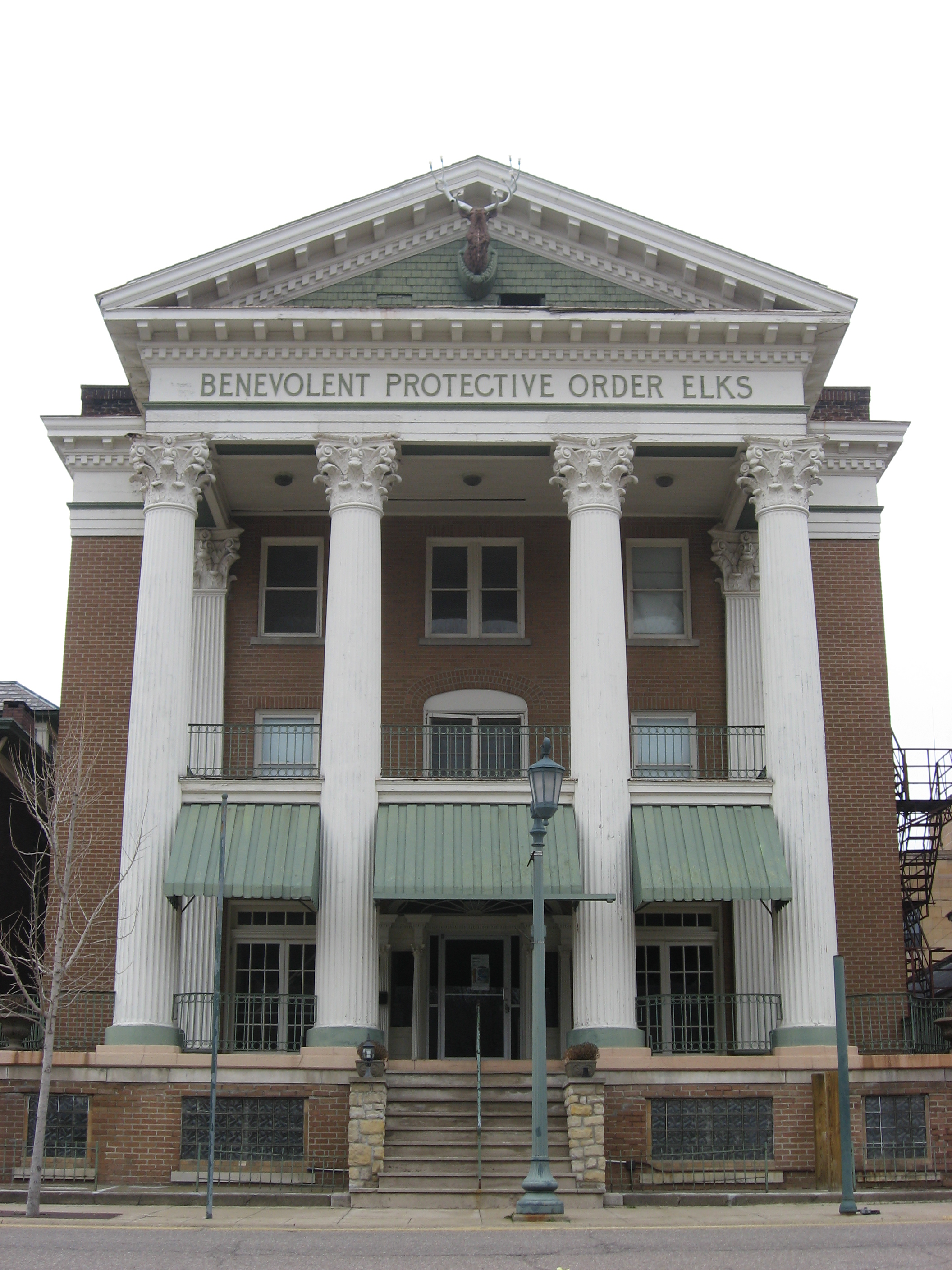

- Location within Ohio Location within the United States
- Location: 139 W. Fifth St., East Liverpool, Ohio
- Coordinates: 40°37′11″N 80°34′54″W
- Area: less than one acre
- Built: 1916
- Architect: Holmboe & Lafferty
- Architectural style: Colonial Revival, Classical Revival
- MPS: East Liverpool Central Business District MRA
- NRHP reference No.: 85003512
- Added to NRHP: November 14, 1985

The Elks Club in East Liverpool, Ohio was built in 1916. It was listed on the National Register of Historic Places in 1985.

The building was addressed in a study assessing historic resources in East Liverpool's central business district which resulted in the NRHP listing of several clubhouse buildings (including also Masonic Temple (East Liverpool, Ohio), Odd Fellows Temple (East Liverpool, Ohio), and YMCA (East Liverpool, Ohio)).
