= Odd Fellows Temple (East Liverpool, Ohio) =

- U.S. National Register of Historic Places
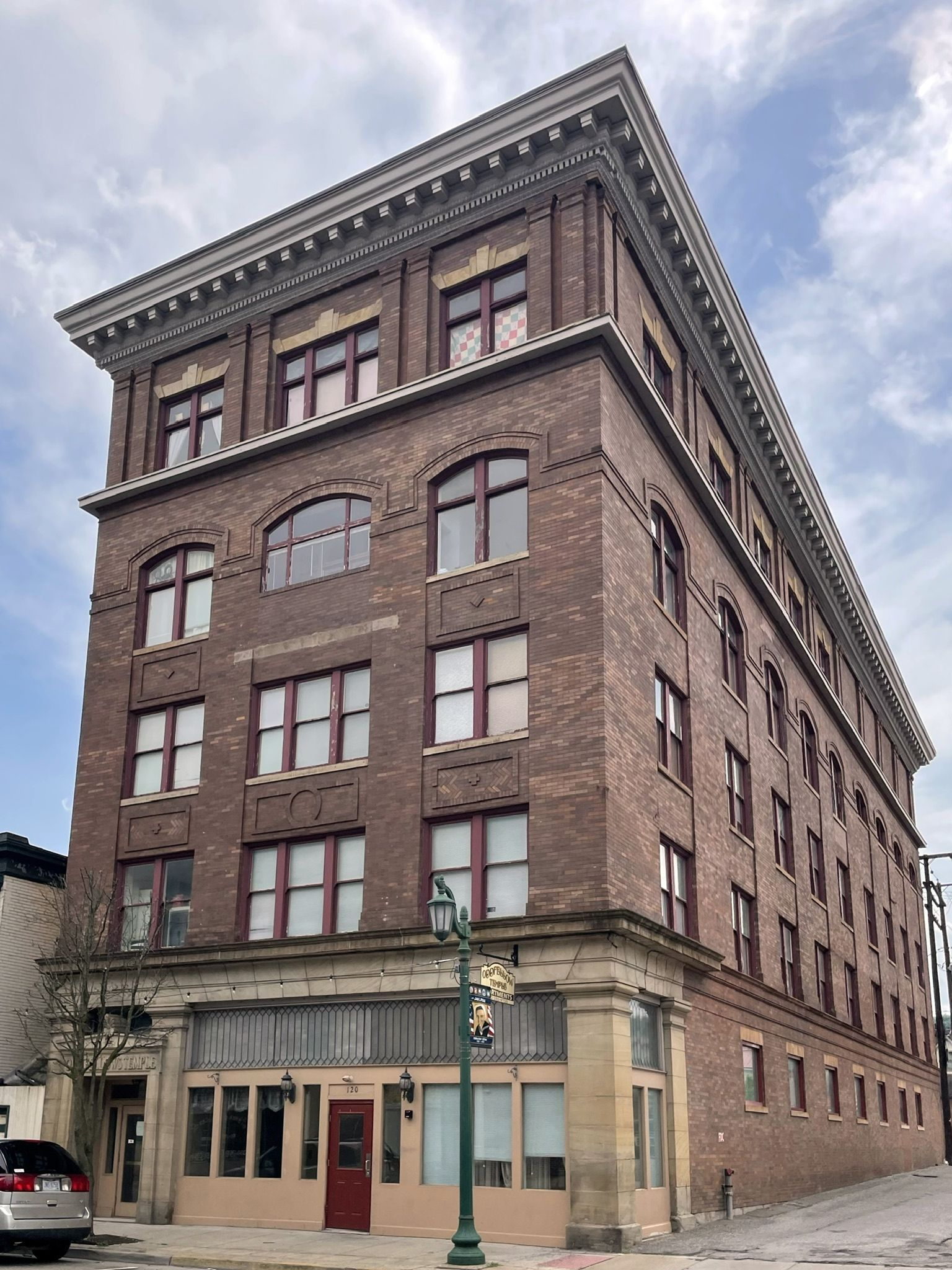

- Location within Ohio Location within the United States
- Location: 120 W. Sixth St., East Liverpool, Ohio
- Coordinates: 40°37′16″N 80°34′50″W
- Area: less than one acre
- Built: 1907
- MPS: East Liverpool Central Business District MRA
- NRHP reference No.: 85003514
- Added to NRHP: November 14, 1985

The Odd Fellows Temple in East Liverpool, Ohio, was built in 1907. It was listed on the National Register of Historic Places in 1985.

It was one of many buildings addressed in a study assessing historic resources in East Liverpool's central business district, a study resulted in the NRHP listing of several historic districts and buildings (including also Masonic Temple (East Liverpool, Ohio), Elks Club (East Liverpool, Ohio), and YMCA (East Liverpool, Ohio)).
