= Richboro, Pennsylvania =

Unincorporated community in Pennsylvania, US

- Census-designated place
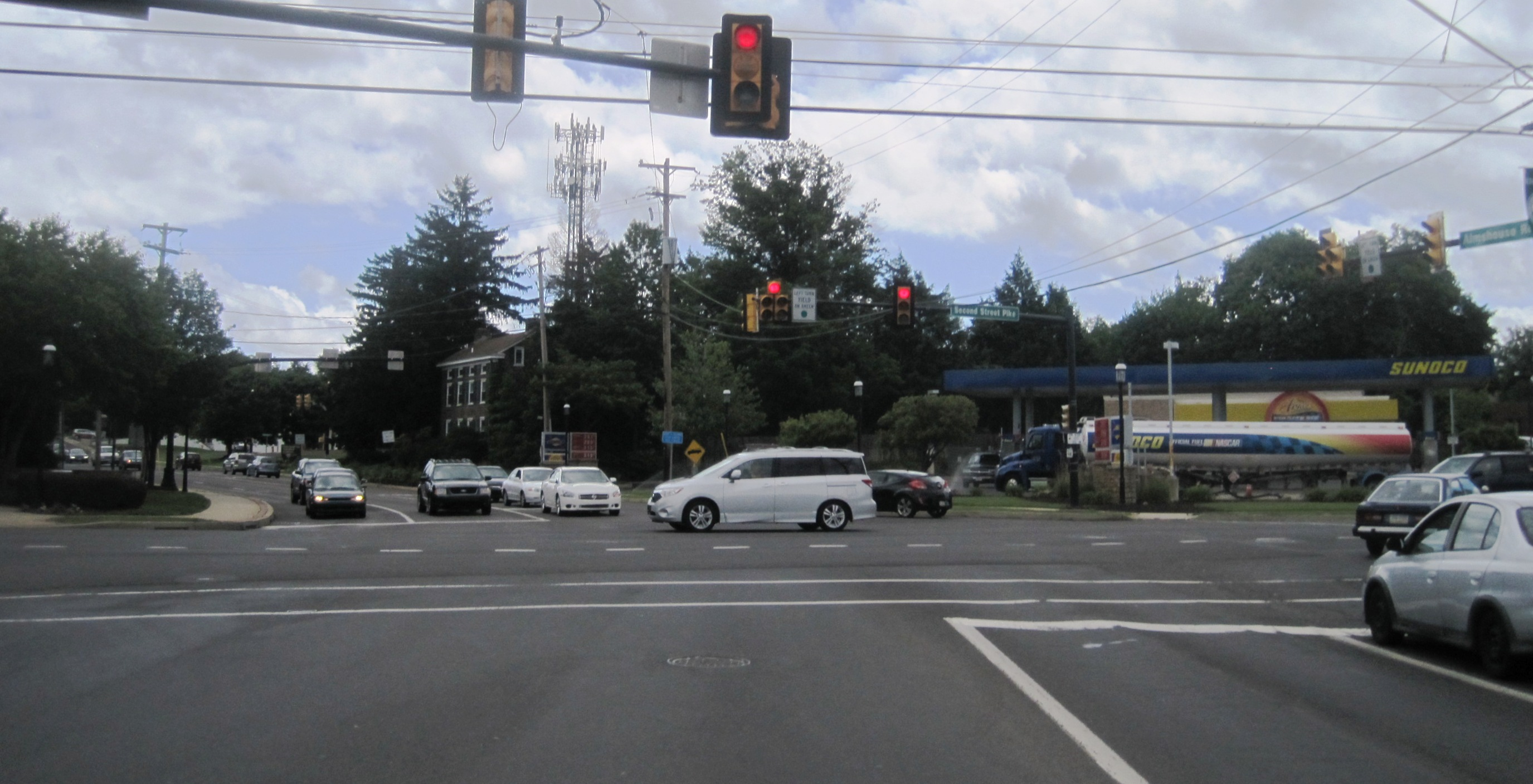
- Center of Richboro at Almshouse Road (PA 332) and Second Street Pike (PA 232)

- Location of Richboro in Pennsylvania Richboro, Pennsylvania (the United States)
- Coordinates: 40°15′18″N 75°00′22″W
- Country: United States
- State: Pennsylvania
- County: Bucks
- Township: Northampton

Area
  - Total: 4.41 sq mi (11.41 km^{2})
  - Land: 4.38 sq mi (11.34 km^{2})
  - Water: 0.027 sq mi (0.07 km^{2})
- Elevation: 262 ft (80 m)

Population (2020)
  - Total: 6,443
  - Density: 1,471.2/sq mi (568.02/km^{2})
- Time zone: UTC-5 (EST)
  - Summer (DST): UTC-4 (EDT)
- ZIP Code: 18954
- Area codes: 215, 267 and 445
- FIPS code: 42-64464

Richboro is a census-designated place (CDP) in Northampton Township, Bucks County, Pennsylvania, United States. The population was 6,378 during the 2020 census.

== History ==
Hampton Hill, John Thompson House, Twin Trees Farm, and Willow Mill Complex are listed on the National Register of Historic Places. Richboro started as an agricultural village, known as Addisville, that was started in the 1700s. It was later renamed in the 1830s to Richborough, after the first postmaster, Richard L. Thomas, who was nicknamed Rich. It was later shortened to Richboro.

== Geography ==
Richboro is located at 40°13′18″N 75°0′22″W (40.221658, -75.006047). Tyler State Park is partially located in Richboro.

According to the U.S. Census Bureau, the CDP has a total area of 4.4 square miles (11 km^{2}), all land.

== Demographics ==
Historical population
Census	Pop.	Note	%±
1990	5,332		—
2000	6,678		25.2%
2010	6,563		−1.7%
2020	6,443		−1.8%

At the 2000 census there were 6,678 people, 2,062 households, and 1,864 families living in the CDP. The population density was 1,524.5 inhabitants per square mile (588.6/km^{2}). There were 2,072 housing units at an average density of 473.0 per square mile (182.6/km^{2}). The racial makeup of the CDP was 97.09% White, 0.36% African American, 1.81% Asian, 0.01% from other races, and 0.72% from two or more races. Hispanic or Latino of any race were 0.63%.

There were 2,062 households, 45.4% had children under the age of 18 living with them, 83.9% were married couples living together, 4.7% had a female householder with no husband present, and 9.6% were non-families. 8.1% of households were made up of individuals, and 4.4% were one person aged 65 or older. The average household size was 3.20 and the average family size was 3.39.

The age distribution was 28.9% under the age of 18, 6.5% from 18 to 24, 25.2% from 25 to 44, 29.7% from 45 to 64, and 9.7% 65 or older. The median age was 40 years. For every 100 females, there were 96.2 males. For every 100 females age 18 and over, there were 92.7 males.

The median household income was $91,204 and the median family income was $94,316. Males had a median income of $67,222 versus $36,351 for females. The per capita income for the CDP was $31,954. About 1.5% of families and 1.8% of the population were below the poverty line, including 1.6% of those under age 18 and 4.4% of those age 65 or over.

== Education ==
Richboro is in Northampton Township. Along with Holland and Churchville, it is part of the Council Rock School District.
