= Alexander Thompson House =

Historic house in New York, United States

- U.S. National Register of Historic Places
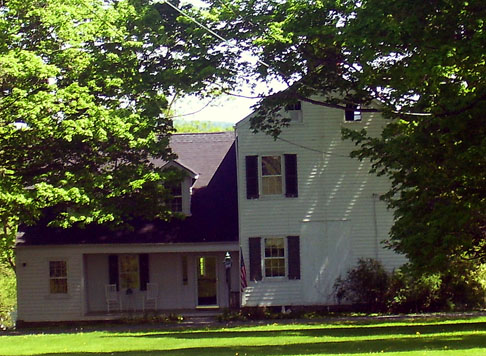
- The house in 2007
- Location: Thompson Ridge, New York
- Nearest city: Middletown
- Coordinates: 41°33′58″N 74°20′15″W
- Built: 1770s, 1822
- Architectural style: Federal Style
- NRHP reference No.: 97000568
- Added to NRHP: 1997

The Alexander Thompson House is one of several originally built by members of the Thompson family in Thompson Ridge, a hamlet in the Town of Crawford in Orange County, New York. It is located, like the others, along NY 302 just south of the intersection with Thompson Ridge Road.

It is split between two different eras. The northeast portion of the house is believed to be part of the original structure. In 1822, however, the southeast portion was built in the Federal Style. It was added to the National Register of Historic Places in 1997.
