= Walter Thompson House and Carriage House =

Historic house in New York, United States

- U.S. National Register of Historic Places
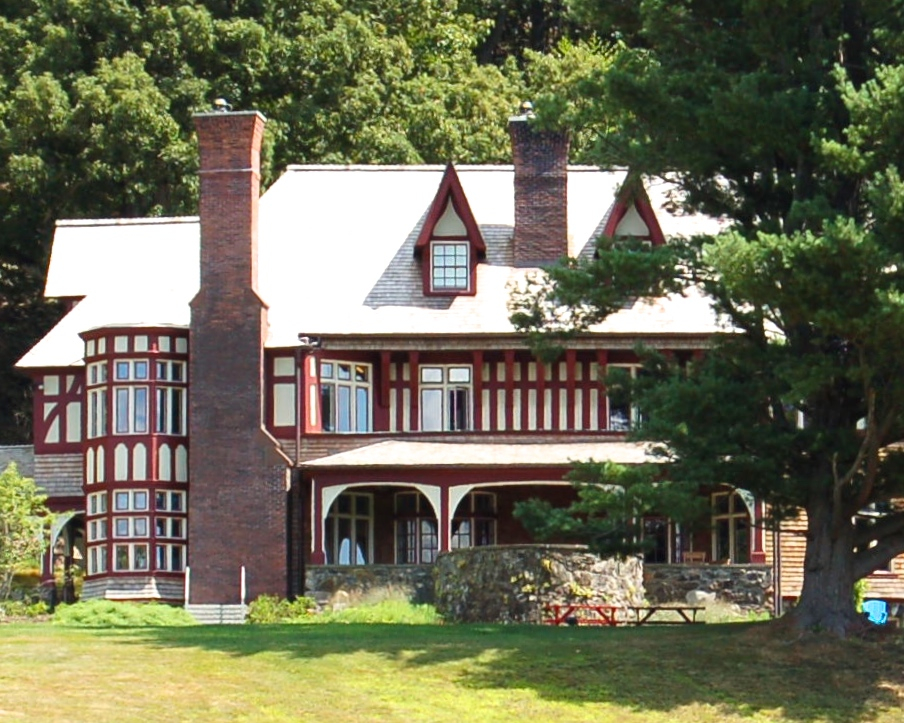

- Location within New York Location within the United States
- Location: Philipsebrook Rd., Philipstown, New York
- Coordinates: 41°23′1″N 73°55′56″W
- Area: 33 acres (13 ha)
- Built: 1883
- Architectural style: Tudor Revival
- MPS: Hudson Highlands MRA
- NRHP reference No.: 82001255
- Added to NRHP: November 23, 1982

Walter Thompson House and Carriage House is a historic home located at Philipstown in Putnam County, New York. The house was named North Redoubt after the American Revolutionary War redoubt on the hill next to the house. It was built between 1883 and 1890 and is a two-story half-timbered building on a stone foundation in the Tudor Revival style. It has a hipped roof whose overhang is supported by heavy timber brackets. The carriage house consists of two wings connected by a hyphen. The main wing has a gable roof and is topped by a cupola with domical roof.

It was listed on the National Register of Historic Places in 1982.

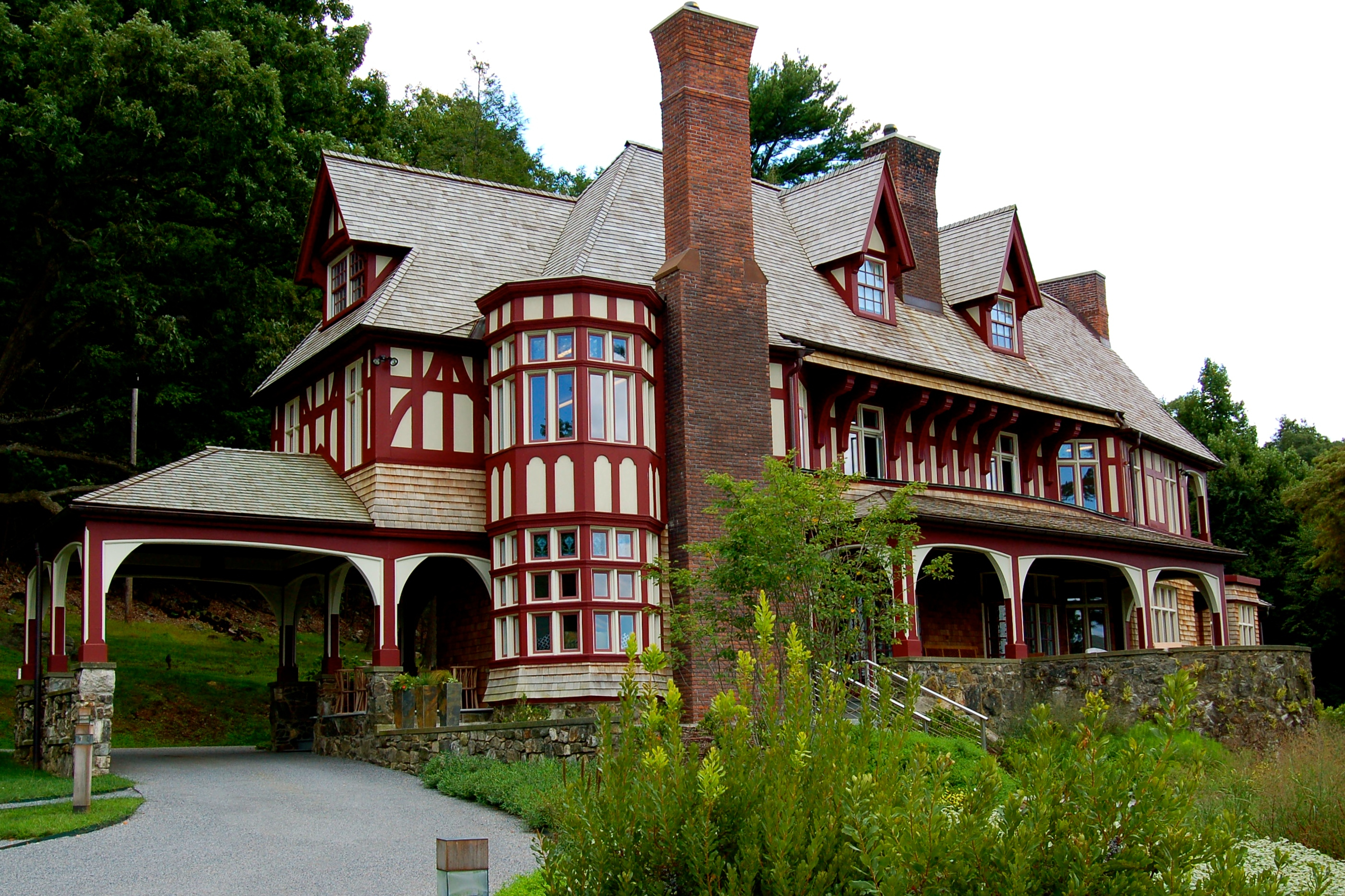
Walter Thompson House is in the hamlet of Garrison, Philipstown, NY.
