= Hampton Hill (Richboro, Pennsylvania) =

Historic house in Pennsylvania, United States

- U.S. National Register of Historic Places
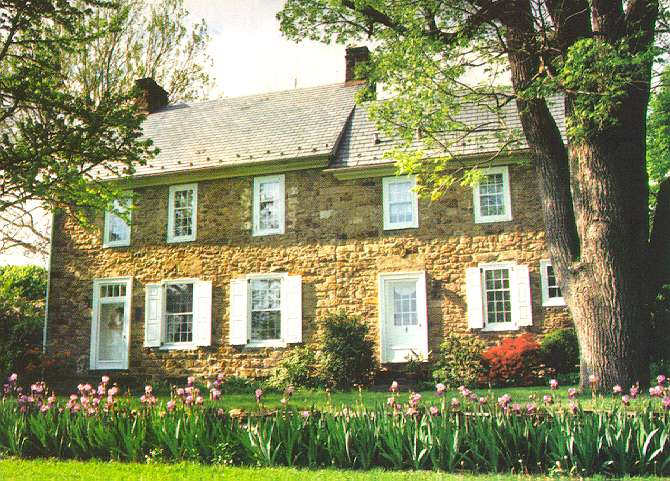
- Hampton Hill, May 2006

- Location within Pennsylvania Location within the United States
- Location: 1269 Second Street Pike, Richboro, Pennsylvania
- Coordinates: 40°13′25″N 75°0′34″W
- Area: 3.3 acres (1.3 ha)
- Built: c. 1744, c. 1790
- Built by: Bennet, Abraham
- Architectural style: Colonial
- NRHP reference No.: 73001594
- Added to NRHP: April 2, 1973

Hampton Hill, also known as the Bennet-Search House, is an historic home that is located in Richboro, Northampton Township, Bucks County, Pennsylvania, United States.

It was added to the National Register of Historic Places in 1973.

== History and architectural features ==
The first section of this historic structure was built circa 1744, and is a 2 1/2-story, two-bay by one-bay, stone house with a gable roof. The larger section was built circa 1790, and is a 2 1/2-story, three-bay by two-bay, stone house with a gable roof. The roof was covered with slate during the twentieth century. The house is thought to have harbored formerly enslaved people who were escaping captivity via the Underground Railroad.
