= Robert A. Thompson House =

Historic house in New York, United States

- U.S. National Register of Historic Places
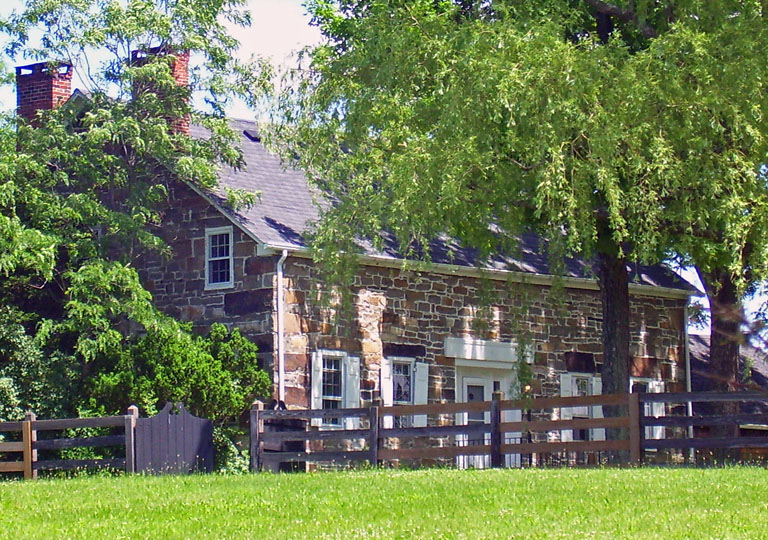
- The house in 2007

- Location within New York Location within the United States
- Location: NY 302, south of the junction of NY 302 and Dickerson Ave., Thompson Ridge, NY
- Nearest city: Middletown
- Coordinates: 41°33′36″N 74°20′32″W
- Area: 11.9 acres (4.8 ha)
- Built: 1822
- Architectural style: Federal
- NRHP reference No.: 98000039
- Added to NRHP: January 30, 1998

The Robert A. Thompson House is located along NY 302 in the Thompson Ridge section of the Orange County, New York, town of Crawford. It was built in 1822 in the Federal style. One of the stones in the northwest cable bears his initials and that date. His descendants established the Dutch-Belt dairy farm, which still operates.

The home was added to the National Register of Historic Places in 1998.
