= Thompson House (Stevens Creek, Arkansas) =

Historic house in Arkansas, United States

- U.S. National Register of Historic Places
- Location within Arkansas Location within the United States
- Nearest city: Stevens Creek, Arkansas
- Coordinates: 35°23′8″N 91°37′52″W
- Area: less than one acre
- Built: 1890
- Architectural style: Vernacular ell-shaped
- MPS: White County MPS
- NRHP reference No.: 91001341
- Added to NRHP: July 23, 1992

The Thompson House is a historic house in rural northern White County, Arkansas, USA. It is located about 1,500 feet (460 m) west of Holly Grove Cemetery, which is located on County Road 328 (Fredonia Road) north of Bald Knob. The house is a vernacular single story ell-shaped wood-frame structure, with a gabled roof, weatherboard siding and a foundation of stone piers. Built about 1890, it is one of the few houses in White County to survive from that time, and was reported to be in declining condition when it was listed on the National Register of Historic Places in 1992.

== See also ==
- National Register of Historic Places listings in White County, Arkansas
