= W. H. Applewhite House =

Historic house in North Carolina, United States

- U.S. National Register of Historic Places
- Location within North Carolina Location within the United States
- Location: Off NC 58, near Stantonsburg, North Carolina
- Coordinates: 35°37′25″N 77°49′18″W
- Area: 176.5 acres (71.4 ha)
- Built: c. 1847, c. 1900
- Architectural style: Greek Revival
- MPS: Wilson MRA
- NRHP reference No.: 86000696
- Added to NRHP: February 13, 1986

W. H. Applewhite House is a historic plantation house located near Stantonsburg, Wilson County, North Carolina. It was built about 1847, and is a two-story, three-bay, single pile, Greek Revival style frame dwelling. It has a one-story, shed roofed rear wing. It features a double-gallery porch with sawn ornament and trim added about 1900. The house was remodeled about 1870–1880. Also on the property are the contributing tenant house, packhouse, stables, sheds, and tobacco barns.

It was listed on the National Register of Historic Places in 1986.
