= Dabney–Thompson House =

Historic house in Virginia, United States

- U.S. National Register of Historic Places
- Virginia Landmarks Register
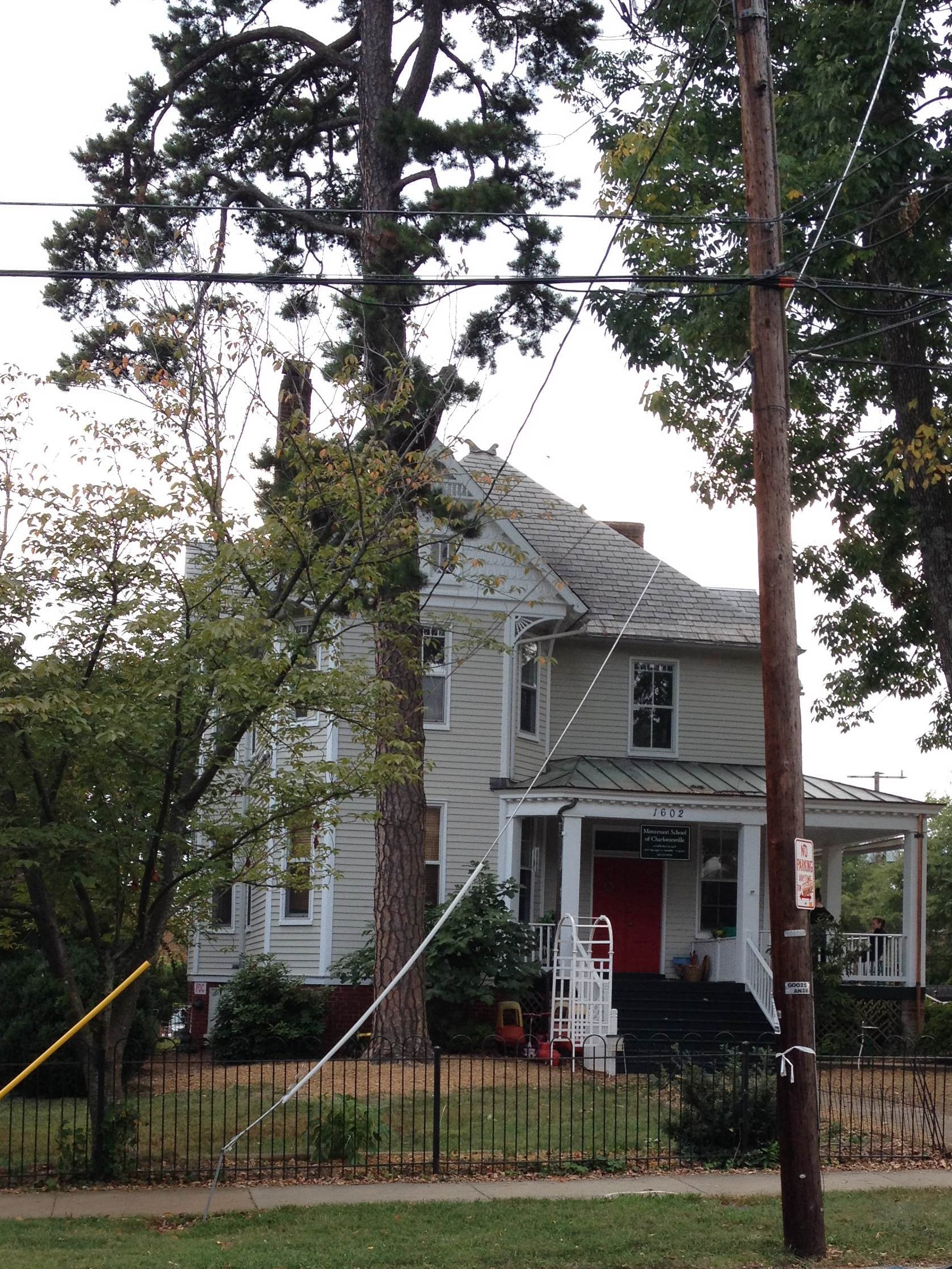

- Location within Virginia Location within the United States
- Location: 1602 Gordon Ave., Charlottesville, Virginia
- Coordinates: 38°2′23″N 78°29′58″W
- Area: less than one acre
- Built: 1894
- Architectural style: Queen Anne
- MPS: Charlottesville MRA
- NRHP reference No.: 84003498
- VLR No.: 104-0243

Significant dates
- Added to NRHP: January 10, 1984
- Designated VLR: October 20, 1981

Dabney–Thompson House is a historic home located at Charlottesville, Virginia. It was built in 1894, and is a two-story Queen Anne style frame dwelling. It is sheathed in weatherboard and features a steeply pitched hipped roof with tall gables over all four projecting bays. The house has projecting eaves and verges and decoratively-sawn exposed rafter ends. It is pierced by three chimneys with corbelled caps. It was built by Richard Heath Dabney, Professor of History and later Dean of the Graduate School of Arts and Sciences at the University of Virginia, father of Virginius Dabney (1901-1995). Dabney sold the house in 1907. The house is occupied by the Montessori School of Charlottesville.

It was listed on the National Register of Historic Places in 1984.
