= Stantonsburg, North Carolina =

- Town
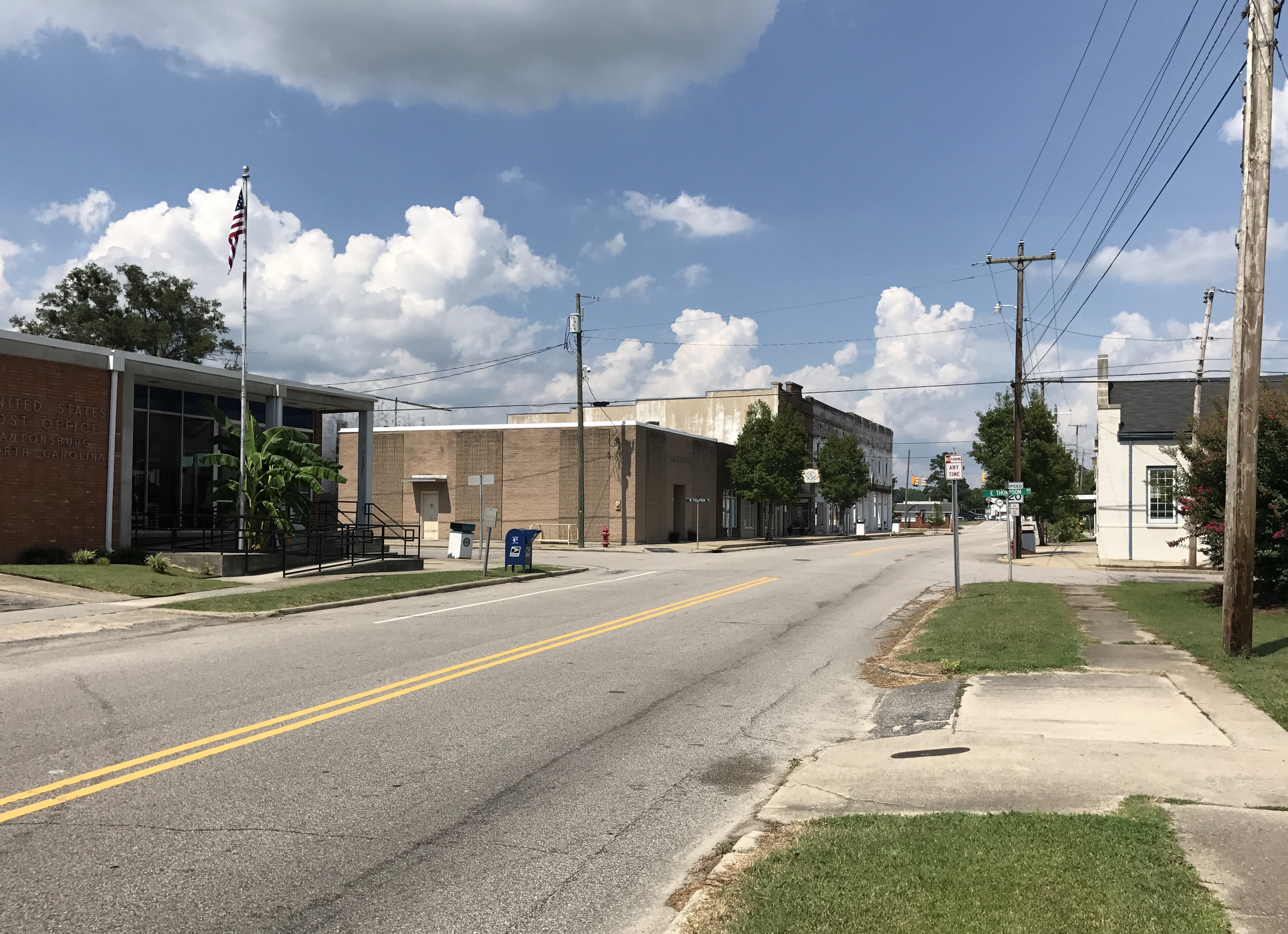
- Motto: "The best Little town in North Carolina"
- Location within the state of North Carolina
- Coordinates: 35°36′19″N 77°49′11″W
- Country: United States
- State: North Carolina
- County: Wilson
- Established: 1817

Area
  - Total: 0.59 sq mi (1.52 km^{2})
  - Land: 0.59 sq mi (1.52 km^{2})
  - Water: 0 sq mi (0.00 km^{2})
- Elevation: 85 ft (26 m)

Population (2020)
  - Total: 762
  - Density: 1,296/sq mi (500.5/km^{2})
- Time zone: UTC-5 (Eastern (EST))
  - Summer (DST): UTC-4 (EDT)
- ZIP code: 27883
- Area code: 252
- FIPS code: 37-64560
- GNIS feature ID: 2406658
- Website: https://www.townofstantonsburg.com/

Stantonsburg is a town in Wilson County, North Carolina, United States. It is named for James Stanton V. As of the 2020 census, Stantonsburg had a population of 762.

== History ==
The W. H. Applewhite House, Edmondson-Woodward House, and Ward-Applewhite-Thompson House were listed on the National Register of Historic Places in 1986.

== Geography ==
According to the United States Census Bureau, the town has a total area of 0.5 square miles (1.3 km^{2}), all land.

== Demographics ==
Historical population
| Census | Pop. | Note | %± |
|---|---|---|---|
| 1880 | 72 | | — |
| 1910 | 204 | | — |
| 1920 | 424 | | 107.8% |
| 1930 | 607 | | 43.2% |
| 1940 | 595 | | −2.0% |
| 1950 | 627 | | 5.4% |
| 1960 | 897 | | 43.1% |
| 1970 | 869 | | −3.1% |
| 1980 | 920 | | 5.9% |
| 1990 | 782 | | −15.0% |
| 2000 | 726 | | −7.2% |
| 2010 | 784 | | 8.0% |
| 2020 | 762 | | −2.8% |
U.S. Decennial Census

At the 2000 census there were 726 people, 305 households, and 207 families in the town. The population density was 1,370.4 inhabitants per square mile (529.1/km^{2}). There were 334 housing units at an average density of 630.4 per square mile (243.4/km^{2}). The racial makeup of the town was 55.65% White, 41.18% African American, 2.89% from other races, and 0.28% from two or more races. Hispanic or Latino of any race were 3.17%.

Of the 305 households 25.6% had children under the age of 18 living with them, 47.5% were married couples living together, 14.4% had a female householder with no husband present, and 32.1% were non-families. 28.5% of households were one person and 15.1% were one person aged 65 or older. The average household size was 2.38 and the average family size was 2.91.

The age distribution was 21.6% under the age of 18, 7.6% from 18 to 24, 27.1% from 25 to 44, 24.1% from 45 to 64, and 19.6% 65 or older. The median age was 42 years. For every 100 females, there were 97.3 males. For every 100 females age 18 and over, there were 85.9 males.

The median household income was $31,167 and the median family income was $38,906. Males had a median income of $28,203 versus $21,806 for females. The per capita income for the town was $13,585. About 6.3% of families and 11.6% of the population were below the poverty line, including 15.9% of those under age 18 and 17.9% of those age 65 or over.
