= James S. Thompson House =

Historic house in Illinois, United States

- U.S. National Register of Historic Places
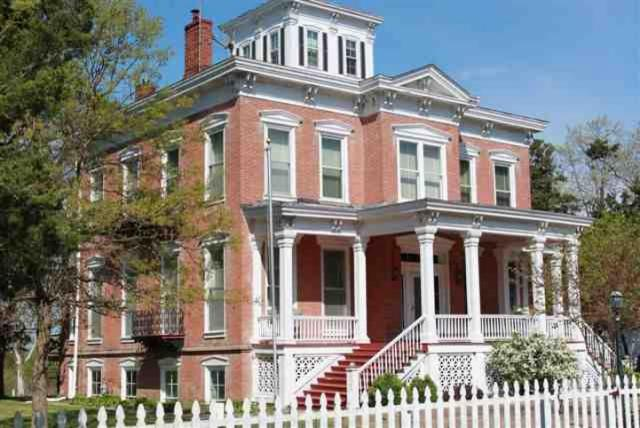
- South and east facades

- Location within Illinois Location within the United States
- Location: 804 North St., New Boston, Illinois
- Coordinates: 41°10′27″N 90°59′46″W
- Area: 2 acres (0.81 ha)
- Built: 1867
- Architectural style: Italianate
- NRHP reference No.: 02000846
- Added to NRHP: December 3, 2002

The James S. Thompson House is a historical home located just outside New Boston, in Mercer County, Illinois. The house and four contributing outbuildings were added to the National Register of Historic Places in 2002.

== Architecture ==
The James S. Thompson House is a two-story brick Italianate structure, and was completed in 1862, built by James S. Thompson, a successful local businessman. The property includes several outbuildings constructed at the same time as the house, including a wash house, wood storage house, and a privy, all made of brick. A wooden barn and wooden children's playhouse were also built by 1862.

The home is built in the Italianate style, 28 feet by 44 feet on the lower floor, 36 feet by 38 feet on the upper. A front gabled roof, cupola, and a basement that extends about five feet above ground combine to give the house additional stature. The floor plan is similar from basement to second floor, with the same four rooms (two on each side, separated by a central hallway) on each floor. The privy is brick with four seats and a ventilation system.

== History ==
Thompson died in 1868. Stanton V. Prentiss, a local farmer and cattleman, rented the property from the estate starting in 1879 and purchased it in 1885.
