= Andrew Thompson Farmstead =

Historic house in New York, United States

- U.S. National Register of Historic Places
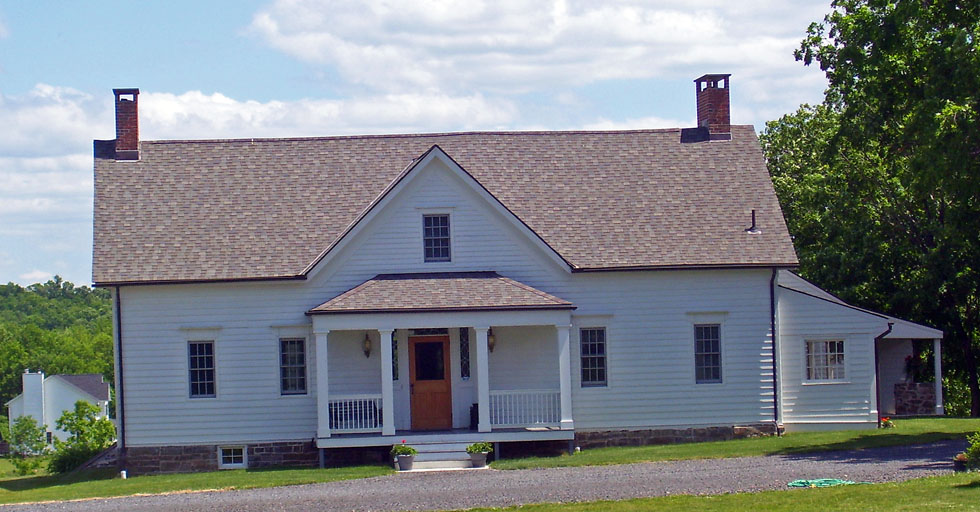
- The house in 2007

- Location within New York Location within the United States
- Location: RD Rte 302, Thompson Ridge, NY
- Nearest city: Middletown
- Coordinates: 41°33′46″N 74°20′25″W
- Area: 10 acres (4.0 ha)
- Built: 1815
- Architectural style: Greek Revival, Federal style
- NRHP reference No.: 04001443
- Added to NRHP: January 5, 2005

The Andrew Thompson Farmstead is one of three Registered Historic Places associated with the eponymous family along NY 302 in Thompson Ridge, an unincorporated section of the Town of Crawford in Orange County, New York.

It was built around 1810 in a combination of two popular styles in early America: Greek Revival and the Federal style. It remains largely intact.

It was added to the National Register of Historic Places in 2005.
