= Thompson Ranch =

- Formerly listed on the U.S. National Register of Historic Places
- Location within Arizona Location within the United States
- Location: Cottonwood-Verde Village, at 2874 US Alt. 89, Cottonwood, Arizona
- Coordinates: 34°43′17″N 111°59′32″W
- Built: 1900
- Architectural style: Queen Anne
- MPS: Cottonwood MRA
- NRHP reference No.: 86002162

Significant dates
- Added to NRHP: September 19, 1986
- Removed from NRHP: May 23, 2016

Thompson Ranch was listed on the National Register of Historic Places near Cottonwood, Arizona, United States. It was delisted May 23, 2016.
