= Ward-Applewhite-Thompson House =

Historic house in North Carolina, United States

- U.S. National Register of Historic Places
- Location within North Carolina Location within the United States
- Location: S side of SR 1539, near Stantonsburg, North Carolina
- Coordinates: 35°36′16″N 77°47′47″W
- Area: 274 acres (111 ha)
- Built: c. 1859, c. 1900
- Architectural style: Greek Revival
- MPS: Wilson MRA
- NRHP reference No.: 86000695
- Added to NRHP: February 13, 1986

Ward-Applewhite-Thompson House is a historic plantation house located near Stantonsburg, Wilson County, North Carolina. It was built about 1859, and is a boxy two-story, three-bay, double pile, Greek Revival style frame dwelling. It has a shallow hipped roof and wrap-around Colonial Revival style porch with Doric order columns added about 1900. Attached to the rear of the house is a gable roofed one-story kitchen connected by a breezeway. Also on the property are a number of contributing outbuildings including two packhouses, stable, and tobacco barns.

It was listed on the National Register of Historic Places in 1986.
