= John Thompson House (Richboro, Pennsylvania) =

Historic house in Pennsylvania, United States

- U.S. National Register of Historic Places
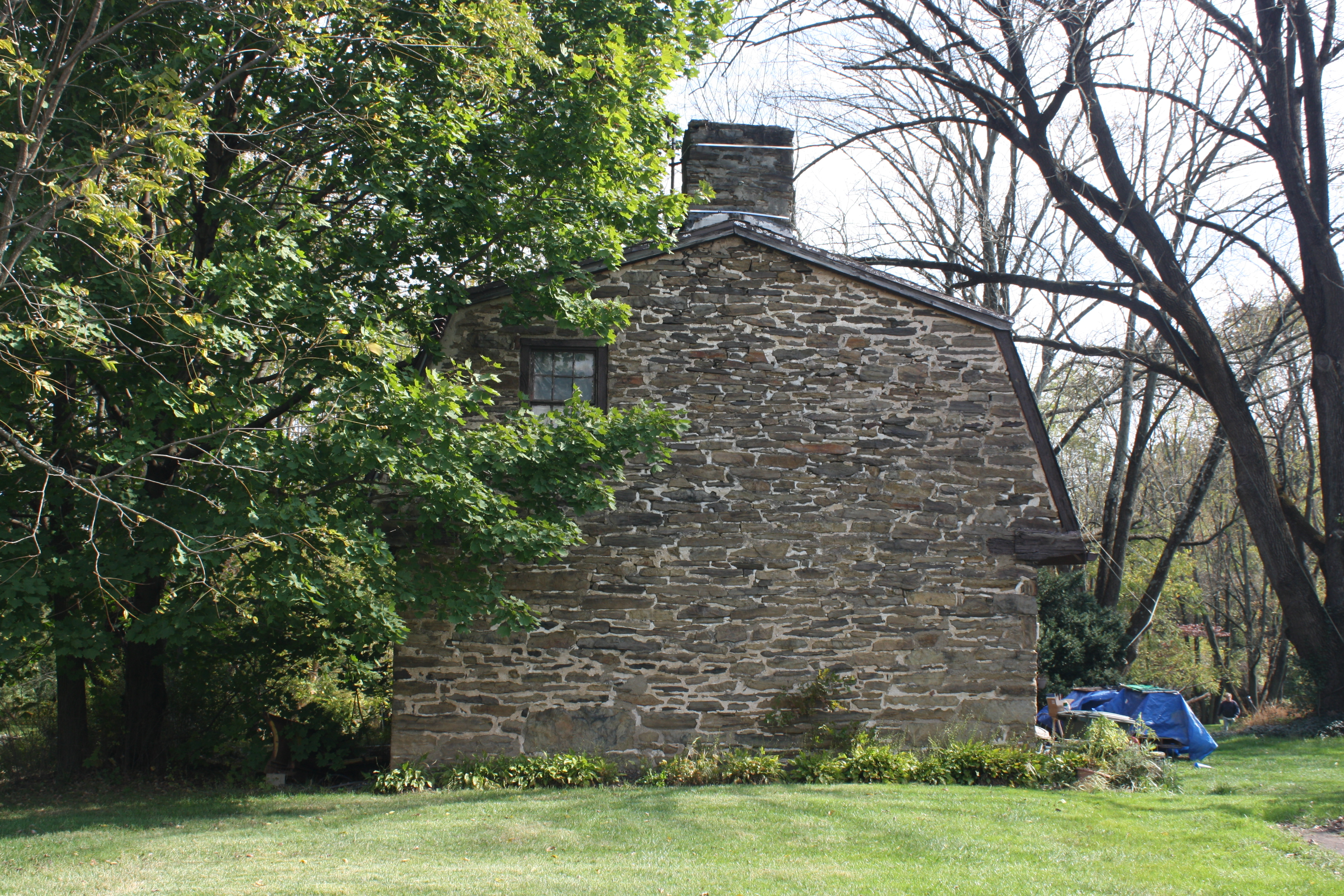
- John Thompson House. October 2012.

- Location within Pennsylvania
- Location: 1925 2nd Street Pike, Northampton Township, Pennsylvania
- Nearest city: Richboro, Pennsylvania
- Coordinates: 40°14′45″N 75°0′30″W
- Built: 1740
- NRHP reference No.: 73001595
- Added to NRHP: July 16, 1973

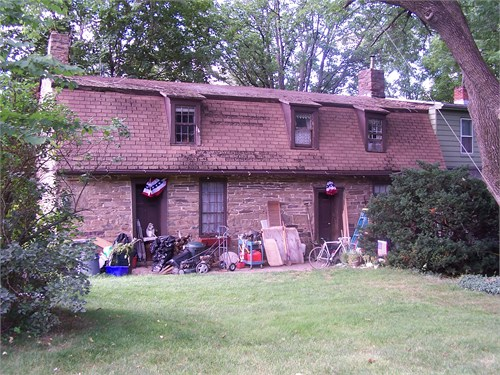
John Thompson House (Front View) May 2011

The John Thompson House is an historic house that is located near Richboro in Northampton Township, Bucks County, Pennsylvania, United States.

It was listed on the National Register of Historic Places on July 16, 1973.

== History and architectural features ==
Built in 1740, this historic house was owned by John Thompson, a local American Revolutionary War veteran. Despite also being known as the Hip Roof House, the house has an elongated-gambrel roof instead of a hip roof.

John Thompson, who was born on November 16, 1726, in County Tyrone, Ireland, emigrated to the United States during the mid-1700s with his mother and three brothers. He served as an ensign in the Northampton Company of Associators during the American Revolution. Son of Elizabeth (McGraudy) Thompson and brother of Robert Thompson who owned the now Historic Thompson-Neeley House in Washington's Crossing.

A miller like his brother Robert, John Thompson married Mary Houston (the twin sister of his brother William's wife) on February 17, 1762. They had nine known children: Elizabeth, Hugh, Jane, John, Robert, John, William, Thomas & James. He was commissioned sheriff of Bucks county on March 22, 1777, and served until October 17, 1779, becoming the first Bucks County sheriff to be commissioned under the constitution of 1776. He was appointed wagon master January 9, 1778, sub-agent for purchasing flour for the French fleet on July 13, 1779, and collector of excise on October 20, 1783. It's probable that his position as a commissioned officer, as well as the fact that he had funds in his hands collected for the use of that government, caused him to receive a visit from the "Tory Doans" during the Revolutionary War. Their animosity was generally directed towards tax collectors.

At his death on July 18, 1799, he was one of the largest landowners in Bucks County with more than 900 acres in his possession. According to his will, his land was divided between his six sons. He was buried in the Presbyterian graveyard in Newtown, Bucks County, PA.

== Later years ==
This house was listed on the National Register of Historic Places on July 16, 1973.

== See also ==
- National Register of Historic Places listings in Bucks County, Pennsylvania
