= James Monroe Thompson House =

Historic house in North Carolina, United States

- U.S. National Register of Historic Places
- Location within North Carolina Location within the United States
- Location: NC 2158 east side, 0.1 miles south of the junction with NC 2150, near Saxapahaw, North Carolina
- Coordinates: 35°58′18″N 79°19′19″W
- Area: 2.4 acres (0.97 ha)
- Built: c. 1850, 1872
- Built by: Thompson, James Monroe
- Architectural style: Log
- MPS: Log Buildings in Alamance County MPS
- NRHP reference No.: 93001198
- Added to NRHP: November 22, 1993

James Monroe Thompson House, also known as Shady Rest, is a historic home located near Saxapahaw, Alamance County, North Carolina. The original one-story, single-pen, log house was built about 1850. In 1872, a two-story log addition was built, and the original building used as a kitchen. The log house is sheathed in weatherboard and sits on a stone foundation.

It was added to the National Register of Historic Places in 1993.
