= East Liverpool Downtown Historic District =

Historic district in Ohio, United States

- U.S. National Register of Historic Places
- U.S. Historic district
- Location within Ohio Location within the United States
- Location: Roughly bounded by W. Sixth St., Dresden Ave., Welch Ave., Broadway, Walnut St., E. Fourth St., and East Alley, East Liverpool, Ohio
- Coordinates: 40°37′08″N 80°34′46″W
- Area: 22 acres (8.9 ha)
- Architect: Kimble, C.C.; et al.
- Architectural style: Italianate, Second Empire, et al.
- MPS: East Liverpool Central Business District MRA
- NRHP reference No.: 01000591
- Added to NRHP: May 30, 2001

The East Liverpool Downtown Historic District is located in East Liverpool, Ohio. The district, which covers approximately 22 acres (8.9 ha), was added to the National Register of Historic Places in May 2001.The district is bordered by West Sixth Street, Dresden Avenue, Welch Avenue, Broadway, Walnut and East Fourth Streets, and East Alley.

East Liverpool, Ohio, was a thriving center of the pottery making business in the late 19th and early 20th centuries. From the 1880s until 1910 the population of the city increased from around 5,000 to over 22,000 people. The historic downtown district is notable for its Italianate and Second Empire artchitecture as well as its prominence as a commercial center in East Liverpool's history.
