= William Thompson House (Camden, Tennessee) =

Historic house in Tennessee, United States

- U.S. National Register of Historic Places
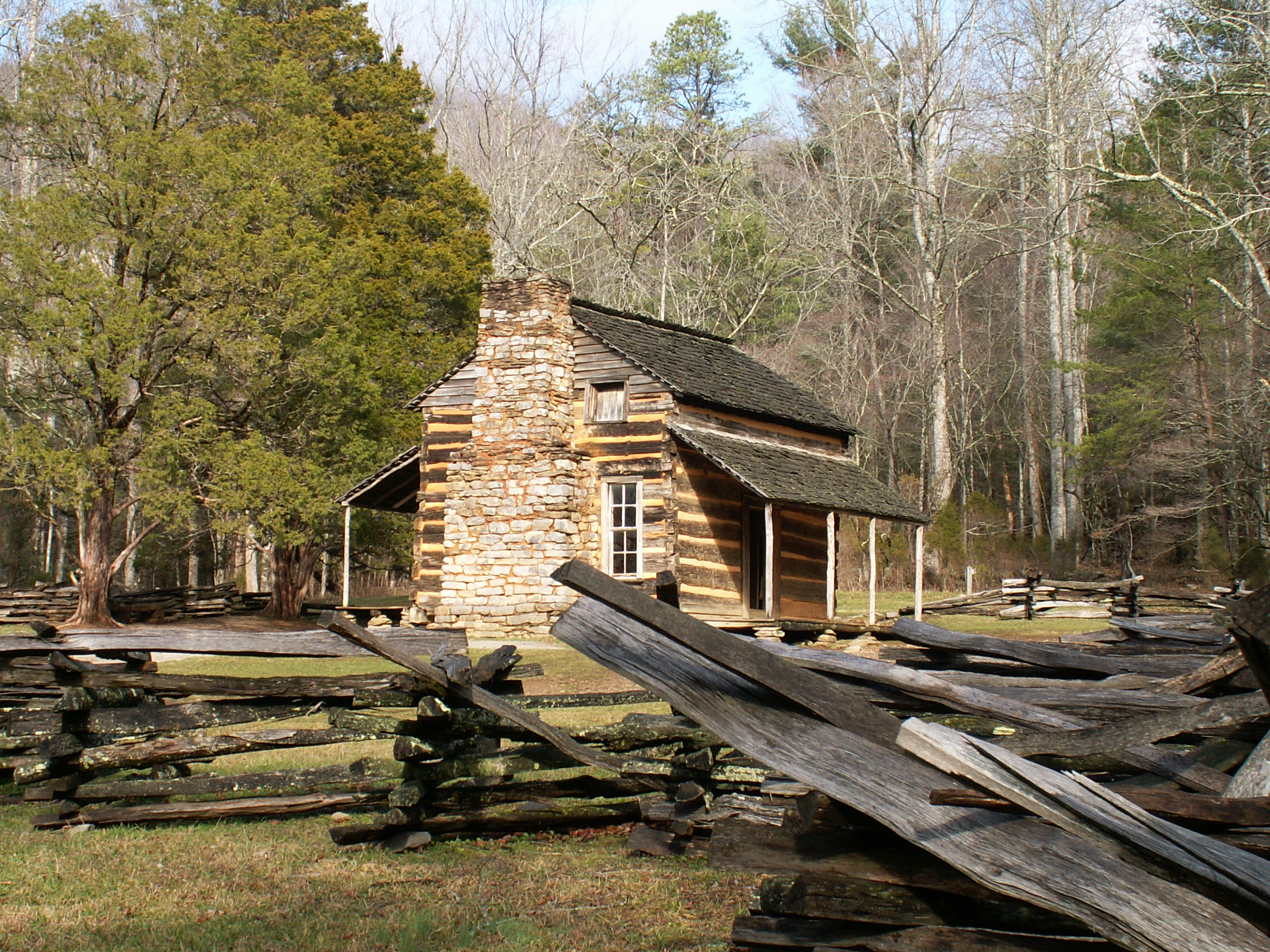

- Location within Tennessee Location within the United States
- Nearest city: Camden, Tennessee
- Coordinates: 36°2′24″N 88°5′37″W
- Built: 1816
- Architectural style: Double-pen Dog-trot
- NRHP reference No.: 76001763
- Added to NRHP: May 6, 1976

William Thompson House is an early 19th-century log cabin in Cypress Valley, near Camden, Tennessee, United States, that was listed on the National Register of Historic Places in 1976. The William Thompson House is one of the few structures remaining from the early settlement period in Benton County. It was built by William Thompson in 1816 or 1819 and typifies the double-pen dogtrot cabin style. It is built from timbers that were squared by hand using an adze and dovetailed together at the corners of the building. There are two main rooms on either side of an open passageway (the "dogtrot"), each served by a free-standing chimney at the end of the building. A loft extends across the entire length of the building, under the gable roof.
