= William H. Thompson Farmstead =

Historic house in Connecticut, United States

- U.S. National Register of Historic Places
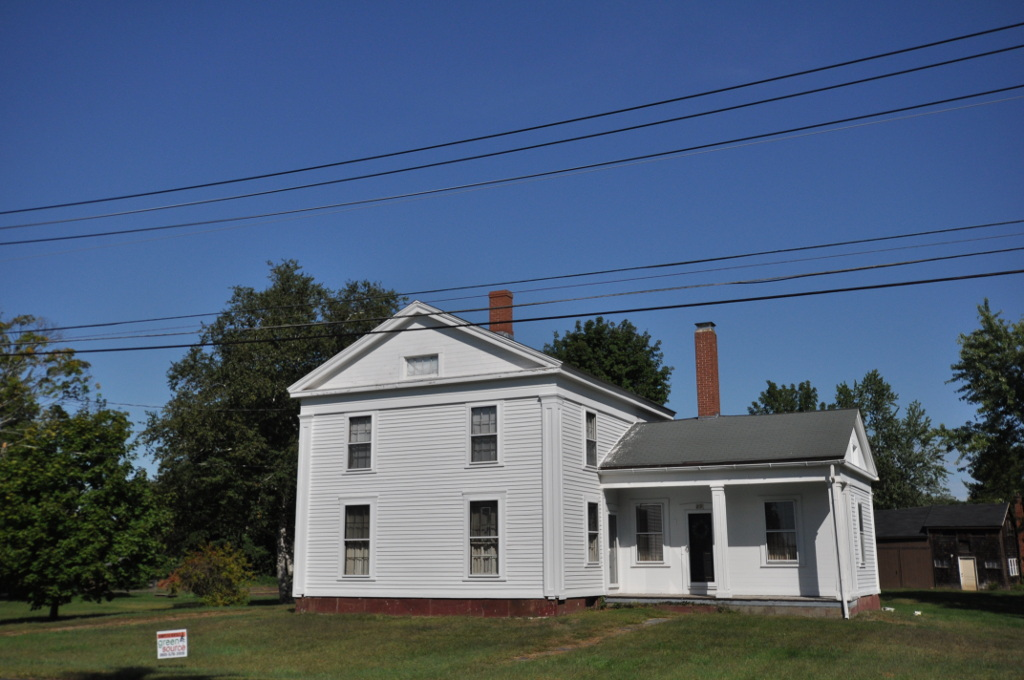

- Location within Connecticut Location within the United States
- Location: 215 and 219 Melrose Road, East Windsor, Connecticut
- Coordinates: 41°56′16″N 72°31′22″W
- Area: 39 acres (16 ha)
- Architectural style: Greek Revival, Bungalow/craftsman
- NRHP reference No.: 03000234
- Added to NRHP: April 18, 2003

The William H. Thompson Farmstead is a historic farm property at 215 and 219 Melrose Road in East Windsor, Connecticut. It includes a 19th-century farmhouse built by a member of one of the community's oldest families, and exhibits changing trends in agriculture uses over a 150-year period. It was listed on the National Register of Historic Places in 2003.

== Description and history ==
The William H. Thompson Farmstead is located in rural northeastern East Windsor's Melrose area, on the north side of Melrose Road at its junctions with East Road and Pease Road. It consists of 39 acres (16 ha), legally separated into two parcels. Set facing the Melrose Road on either side of Pease Road are a c. 1850 Greek Revival farmhouse (to the right) and a more modest Bungalow style house (to the left) built in 1917. Behind the farmhouse stand two barns and a pumphouse, all of 19th-century construction, while a small period garage stands behind the Bungalow house.

The land in this area was probably first cultivated by colonial settlers in the 17th century, when it was part of Windsor. The Thompson family were among those first settlers, and one of their descendants, William H. Thompson, built the Greek Revival farmhouse around 1850. Thompson was a prominent local leader, serving as tax assessor and town selectman for some years, and also serving for two years in the state legislature. He was instrumental in the establishment and construction of the Broad Brook Congregational Church, where he also held many titles. In 1900 he sold the farmstead to John Pease, whose family owned it until 1957. The Bungalow was built in 1917 for his sisters Laura and Zeba.

== See also ==
- National Register of Historic Places listings in Hartford County, Connecticut
