= Toms Run =

Toms Run may refer to:

- Toms Run (Twin Creek), a stream in Ohio
- Toms Run (Clarion River), a stream in Pennsylvania
- Toms Run (New River), a stream in West Virginia

== See also ==
- Little Toms Run
