= Lockington Covered Bridge =

- U.S. National Register of Historic Places
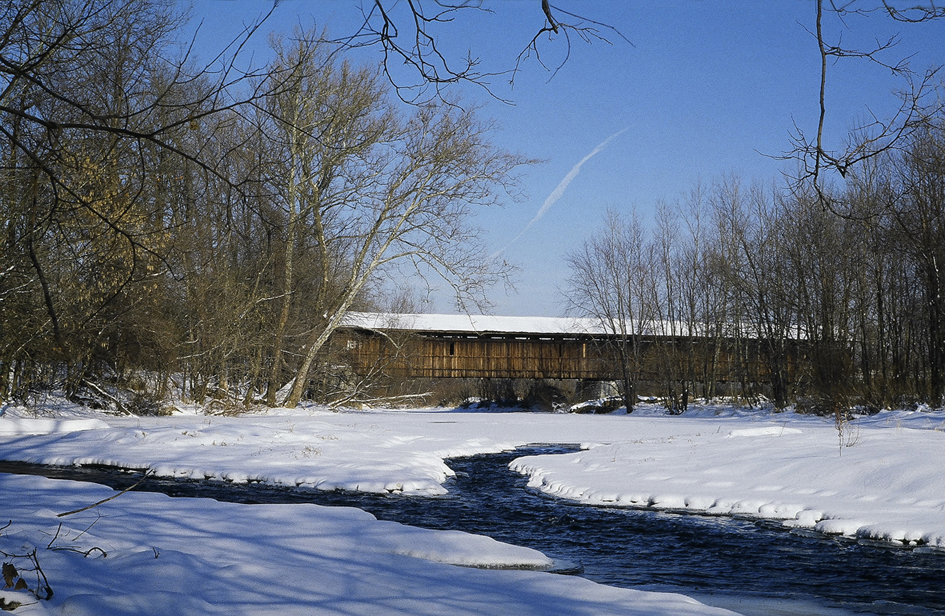
- Southern side of the bridge

- Location within Ohio Location within the United States
- Nearest city: Lockington, Ohio
- Coordinates: 40°12′4″N 84°12′58″W
- Area: less than one acre
- Built: 1848
- Architectural style: Long truss
- NRHP reference No.: 75001532
- Added to NRHP: June 10, 1975

The Lockington Covered Bridge was a historic covered bridge that once spanned the Great Miami River near Lockington, Ohio, United States. Built in 1848, it employed the Long Truss method of construction. Construction elements included vertical wooden siding, wooden structural elements, wooden shingles on its roof, and cut stone abutments. Measuring approximately 170 feet (52 m) long, the bridge was composed of two spans; it cost $1,500 to build.

At the time of its construction, the Lockington bridge was part of a prosperous area whose economy was driven by traffic on the Miami and Erie Canal. Although the area's economy has declined since that time, some historic elements remain, and the covered bridge remained a major component of the area's historic nature long after the closure of the canal. By the 1970s, it had become one of the county's oldest extant bridges: it was the only covered bridge in its original location, and it was one of only eight Long Truss covered bridges throughout Ohio. In recognition of its engineering significance, the bridge was listed on the National Register of Historic Places in 1975.

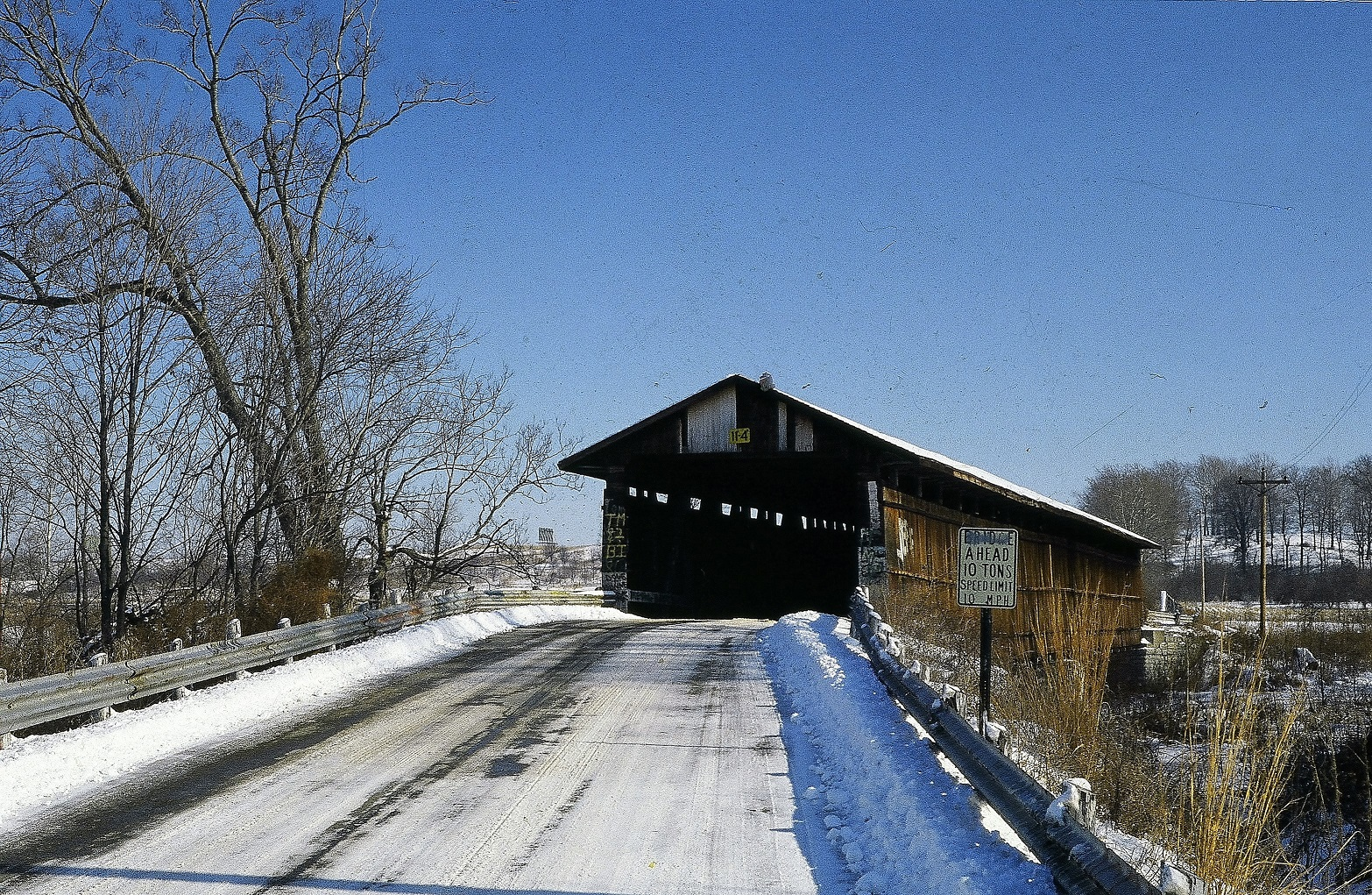
Western portal

By the tenth anniversary of its designation as a historic site, the bridge had deteriorated significantly. As wear had damaged the abutments, and as the floor had partially rotted, the Shelby County Engineer's Office closed the bridge in 1985. Four years later, the bridge was destroyed by an unexpected fire. Until that point, the county had been seeking to create a park surrounding the bridge; these plans were quickly cancelled. Despite its destruction more than thirty years ago, the Lockington Covered Bridge remains on the National Register.
