= Aukerman =

Aukerman (/ˈɑː.kɜːr.mɪn/ AH-kur-min) is a surname. Notable people with the surname include:

- Craig Aukerman (born 1976), American football coach
- James V. Aukerman (born 1948), American lawyer
- Milo Aukerman (born 1963), American singer and songwriter
- Russell Aukerman, 19th-century American football player and coach
- Scott Aukerman (born 1970), American actor, writer, television personality and podcast host

== See also ==
- Aukerman, Ohio
- Aukerman Creek
