= Price Creek =

Price Creek may refer to:

- Price Creek (Iowa)
- Price Creek (Ohio)
- Price Creek (Pennsylvania)
