= Great Flood of 1913 =

Natural disaster affecting the southern and eastern United States

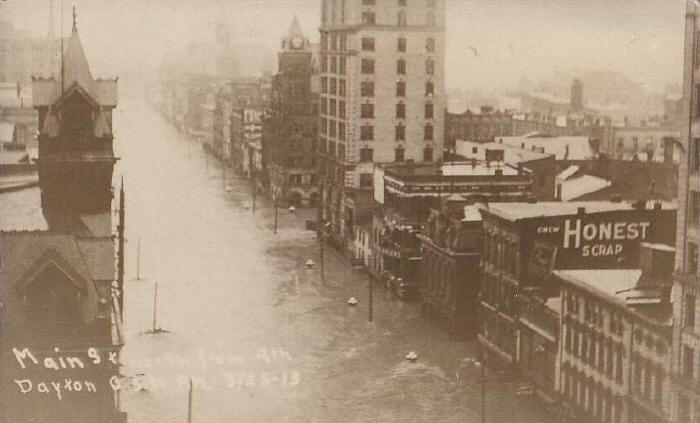
- Main Street in Dayton, Ohio, during the flood
- Date: March 23–26, 1913
- Location: Alabama, Arkansas, Connecticut, Illinois, Indiana, Kentucky, Louisiana, Maryland, Massachusetts, Mississippi, Missouri, New Hampshire, New Jersey, New York, North Carolina, Ohio, Pennsylvania, Tennessee, Vermont, and Virginia
- Deaths: est. 650
- Property damage: $333,000,000

The Great Flood of 1913 occurred between March 23 and March 26, after major rivers in the central and eastern United States flooded from runoff and several days of heavy rain. Related deaths and damage in the United States were widespread and extensive. While the exact number is not certain, flood-related deaths in Ohio, Indiana, and eleven other states are estimated at 650, making the Great Flood of 1913 one of the deadliest floods in United States history, second only to the Johnstown Flood of 1889. The official death toll range for Ohio alone falls between 422 and 470, while estimates in Indiana range from 100 to 200. More than a quarter million people were left homeless. The flood is also Ohio's largest weather disaster. Damage from the Great Dayton Flood at Dayton, Ohio, exceeded $73 million (equivalent to $1.75 billion in 2025), while Indiana's damages were estimated at $25 million ($598 million in 2025). Further south, along the Mississippi River, damages exceeded $200 million ($4.79 billion in 2025).

State and local communities handled much of their own disaster response and relief. The American Red Cross, a small organization at that time, focused its efforts in more than one hundred of Ohio's hardest-hit communities, including Dayton, and served six of Indiana's hardest-hit counties. Governor of Ohio James M. Cox called on the state legislature to appropriate $250,000 ($8.14 million in 2025) for emergency aid. Indiana governor Samuel M. Ralston appealed to Indiana cities and other states for relief assistance. Many communities cared for their own flood victims with Red Cross assistance, charitable donations, and contributions from local businesses, industries, and service organizations.

Devastation from the Flood of 1913 and later floods along the Mississippi River eventually changed the country's management of its waterways and increased federal support for comprehensive flood prevention and flood control projects. The Ohio Conservancy Act, signed by Governor Cox in 1914, became a model for other states to follow. The act allowed for the establishment of conservancy districts with the authority to implement flood control projects.

== Meteorological background ==
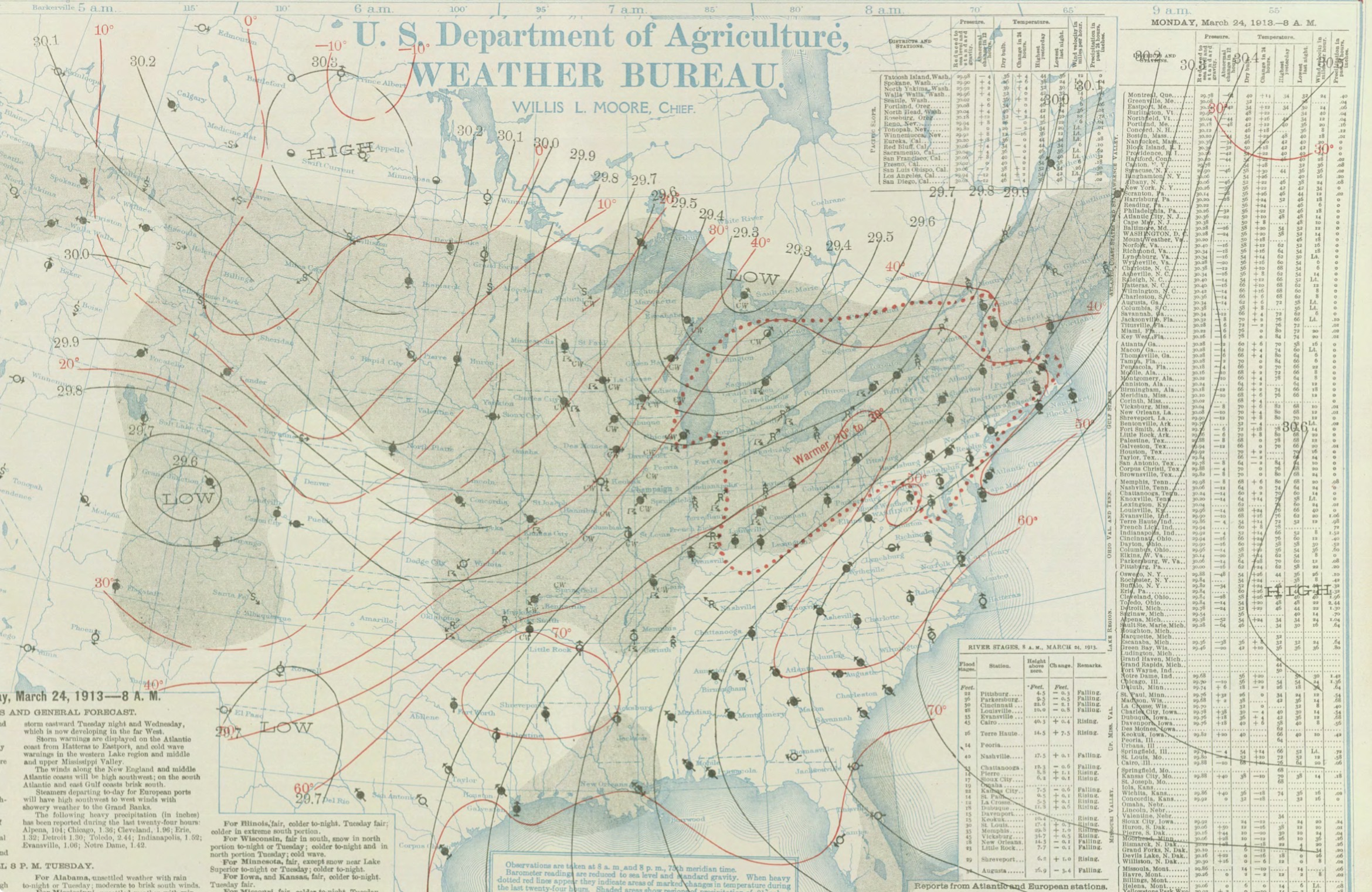
Surface weather map on March 24, showing the low-pressure area over the Great Lakes

The storm system that resulted in the flooding of late March 1913 began with a typical winter storm pattern, but developed characteristics that promoted heavy precipitation. Strong Canadian winds stalled a high-pressure system off Bermuda and delayed the normal easterly flow of a low-pressure system, allowing the system to linger over the same region for multiple days. In the meantime, moist air from the Gulf of Mexico moved into the Midwestern United States through the Mississippi River valley as a second Canadian high-pressure system arrived from the west, creating a low-pressure trough that stretched from southern Illinois, across central Indiana, and into northern Ohio. At least two low-pressure systems moving along the trough caused heavy rain over the four-day period between March 23 and March 26.

As the storm gained strength on Sunday, March 23, high winds, hail, sleet, and tornadoes arrived in the Great Plains, the Southern United States, and the Midwestern United States. Major tornadoes hit Omaha, Nebraska; Lone Peach, Arkansas; and Terre Haute, Indiana. On Monday and Tuesday, March 24 and 25, 3 to 8 inches (76 to 203 mm) of rain fell in Ohio, Indiana, and southern Illinois. Major rivers in Indiana and Ohio experienced heavy runoff. Downstream, where the Ohio River enters the Mississippi River, the water level broke record highs to that time as the water flowed south to the Gulf of Mexico. By March 25, the Ohio River and its tributaries flooded cities such as Indianapolis, Indiana, and Cincinnati, Youngstown, and Columbus, Ohio. Dayton, Ohio, was particularly impacted. On Wednesday, March 26, the storm moved east into Pennsylvania and New York, while heavy rain continued in the Ohio River valley. The heaviest rainfall, 6 to 9 inches (150 to 230 mm) or more, covered an area from southern Illinois into northwestern Pennsylvania. As the storm continued eastward, flooding began in New York, Massachusetts, Vermont, and Virginia. The Potomac River overflowed its banks in Maryland.

== Affected areas ==
The storms that created the floods in 1913 continued over several days and produced record-breaking rain. It remains Ohio's "largest weather disaster" and triggered Indiana's worst flood on record. Storm-related flooding affected more than a dozen states: Alabama, Arkansas, Connecticut, Illinois, Indiana, Kentucky, Louisiana, Maryland, Massachusetts, Mississippi, Missouri, New Hampshire, New Jersey, New York, North Carolina, Ohio, Pennsylvania, Tennessee, Vermont, and Virginia. The same weather system caused major tornadoes in the Great Plains, the South, and the Midwest, most notably in Omaha, Nebraska; Lone Peach, Arkansas; and Terre Haute, Indiana.

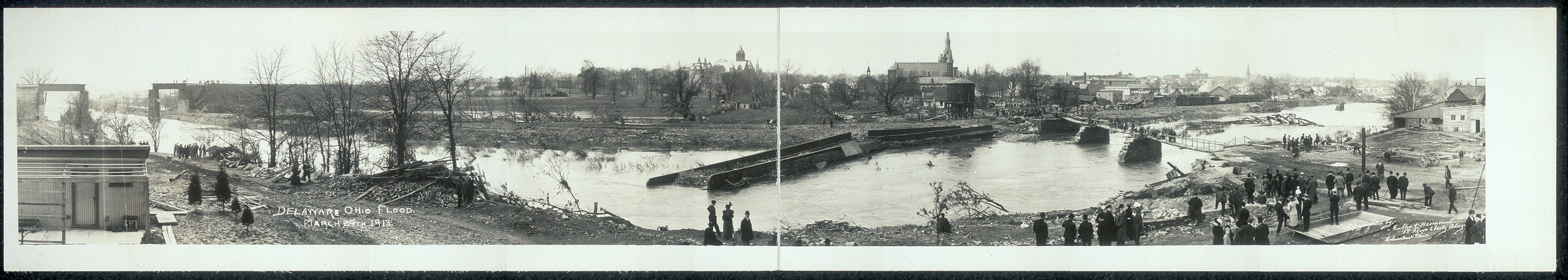
Flooding in Delaware, Ohio on March 29, 1913

=== Dayton, Ohio ===
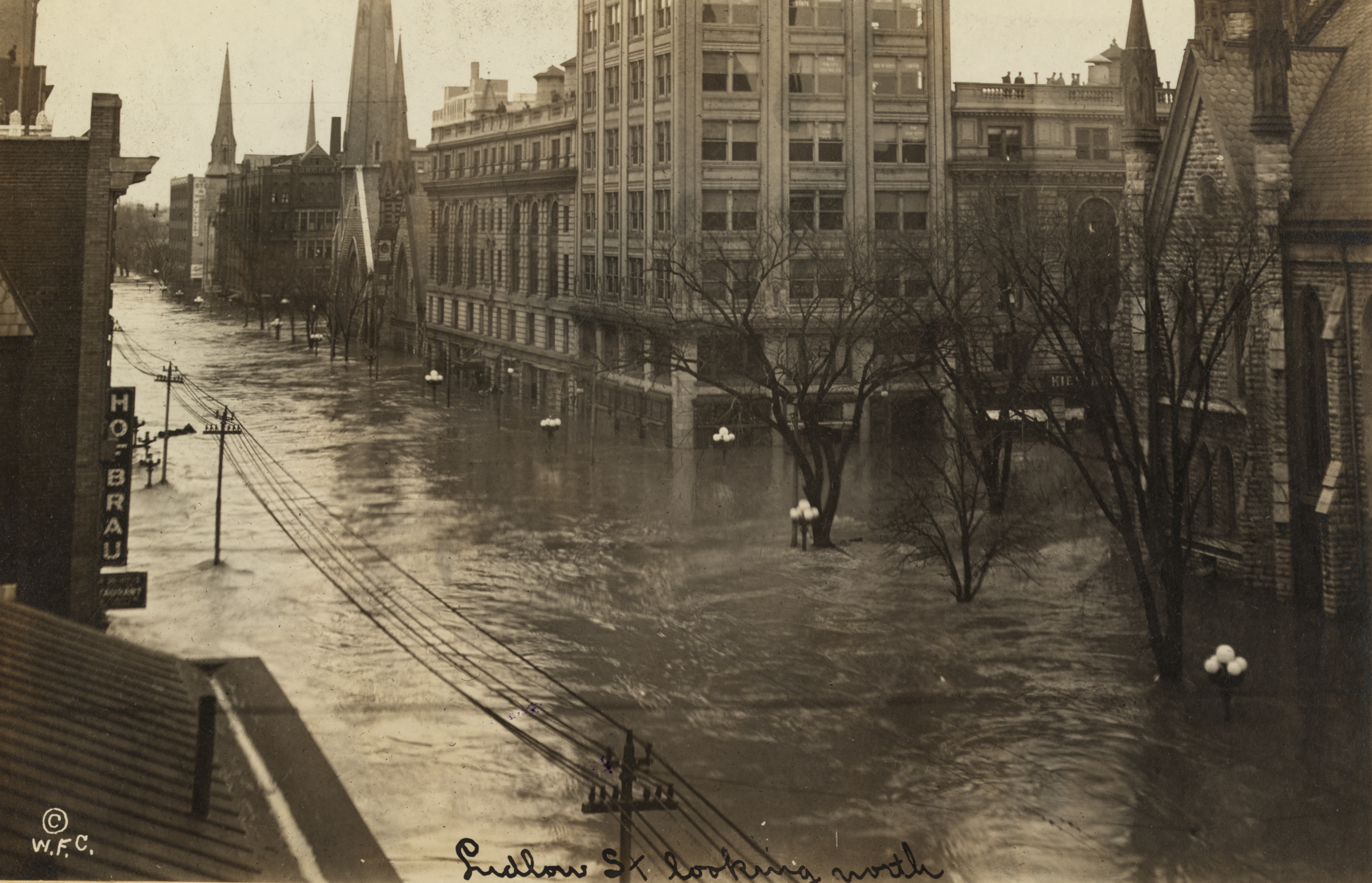
Ludlow Street in Dayton, Ohio during the Great Dayton Flood of 1913

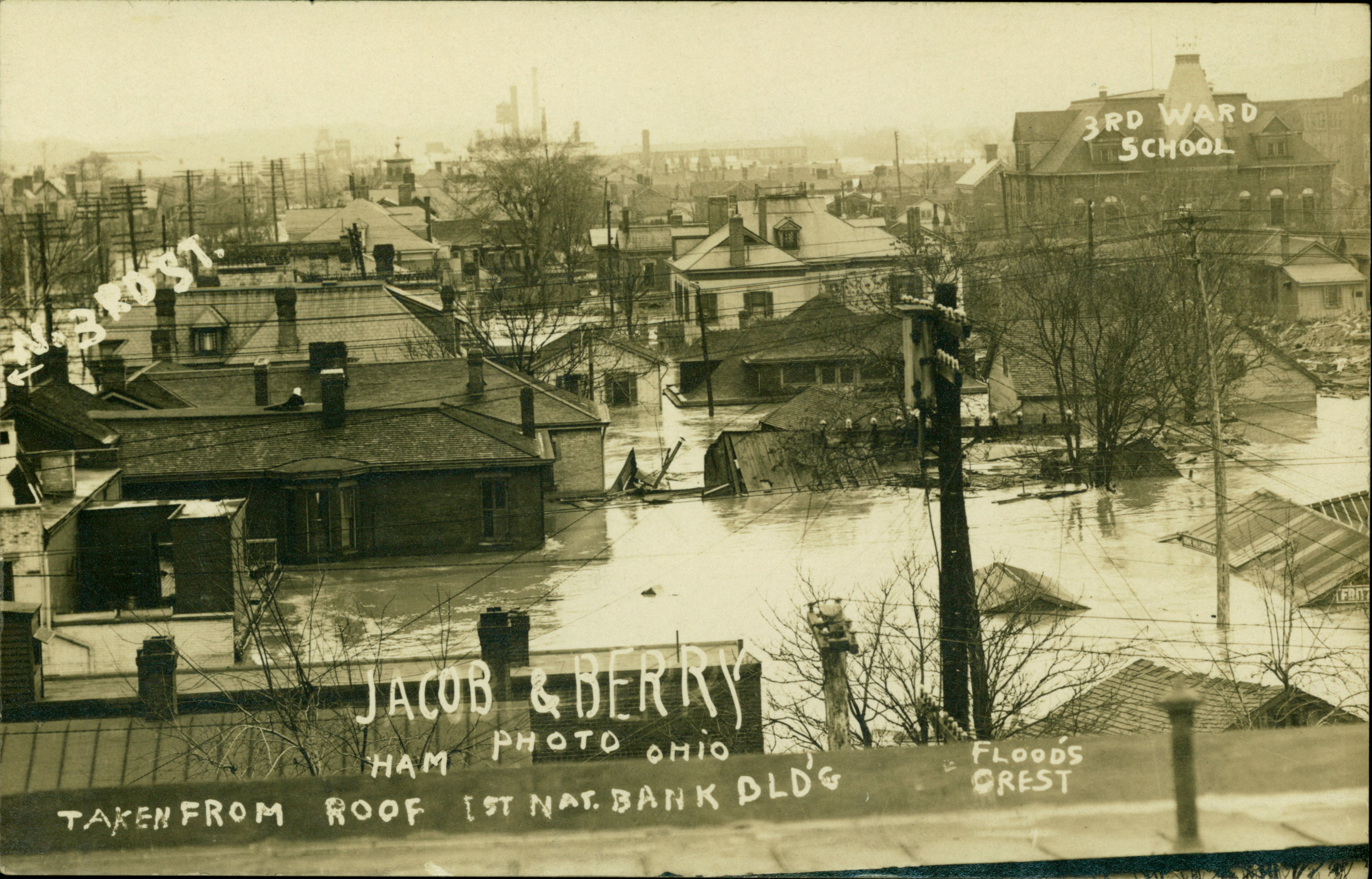
The Great Flood in Hamilton, Ohio

Between March 23 and 25, heavy rains and rising waters from the Great Miami River burst levees on Dayton's south side and flooded 14 square miles (36 km^{2}) of the city. Dayton's downtown streets experienced water 10 feet (3.0 m) deep. On March 26, as floodwaters reached their crest, Dayton's business district suffered more damage after an early morning fire and gas explosion. An estimated 123 people were killed by the flooding in Dayton. Downstream in nearby Hamilton, Ohio, about 100 people died after water 10 to 18 feet (3.0 to 5.5 m) deep flowed into its residential neighborhoods.

=== Columbus, Ohio ===
In Columbus, the Near West Side and parts of downtown experienced severe floods. Approximately 93 people died in the flooding. The event was described by historian Ed Lentz as "the worst catastrophe in the history of Columbus".

=== Indianapolis, Indiana ===
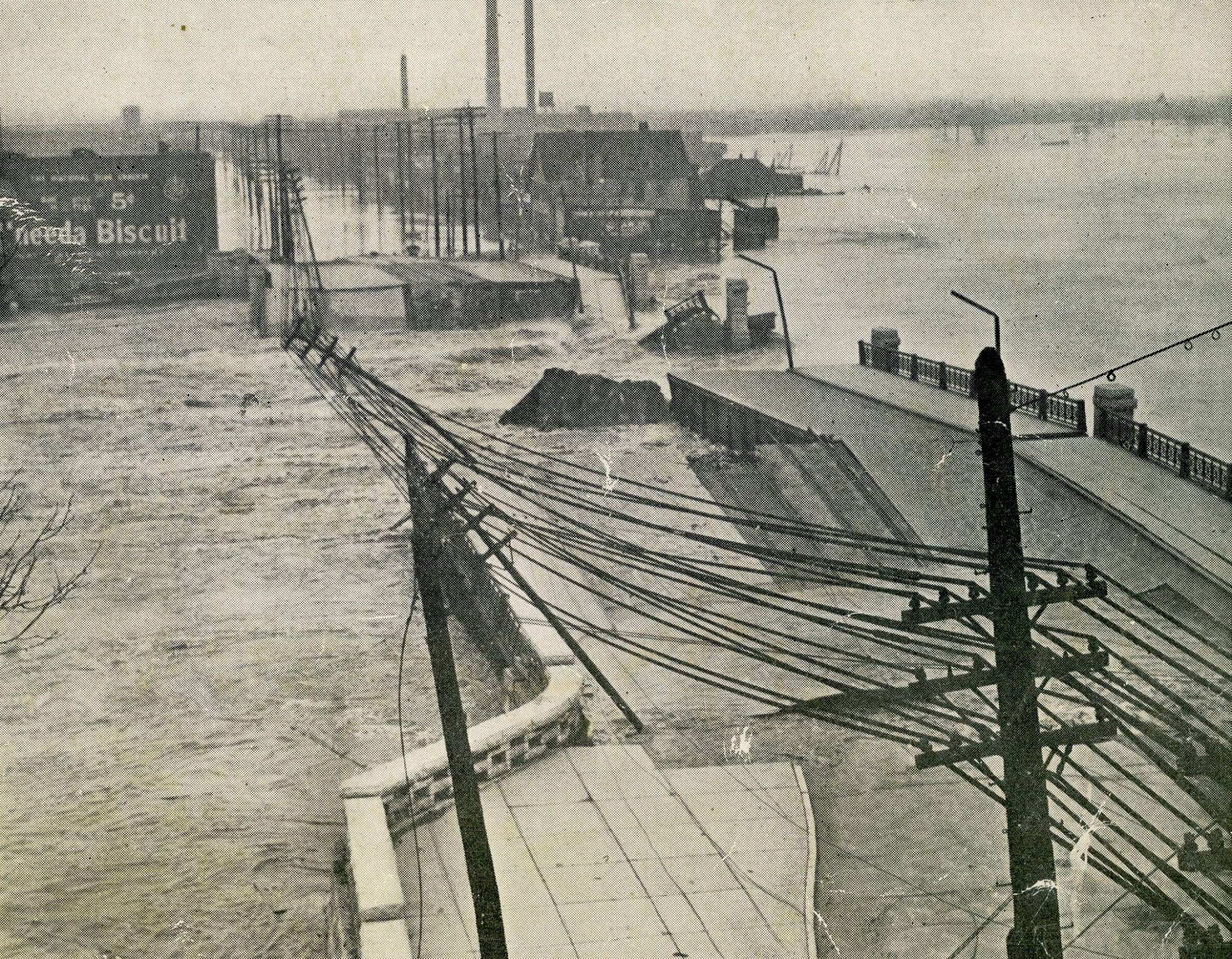
Washington Street bridge collapse in Indianapolis

Approximately 6 inches (150 mm) of rain fell on Indianapolis over the period of March 23 through March 26, inundating nearly a 6-square-mile (16 km^{2}) area and causing five known deaths. On March 26, floodwaters estimated at 19.5 feet (5.9 m) above flood stage destroyed Indianapolis's Washington Street bridge, the main connection over the White River. High water forced 4,000 to flee their homes on the city's near west side when an earthen levee failed and a 25-foot (7.6 m) wall of water flooded an area nearly a 1/2 mile (0.80 km) wide around Kentucky Avenue and Morris Street. The city's transportation and water supply were disrupted for nearly four days in flooded areas and as many as 7,000 Indianapolis families lost their homes.

== Contributing factors ==
=== Weather ===
The weather pattern that triggered heavy rains over the Midwest began after strong Canadian winds stalled a high-pressure system off Bermuda and delayed the normal easterly flow of a low-pressure system. As moist air from the Gulf of Mexico moved into the Midwest through the Mississippi River valley, a second Canadian high-pressure system arrived from the west and squeezed the low into a trough that stretched from southern Illinois, across central Indiana, and into northern Ohio. At least two low-pressure systems moving in quick succession along the trough dumped one rainstorm after another. The weather pattern changed little over the four-day period of March 23 through March 26 and caused heavy rain over the Ohio River valley. The heaviest rainfall, 6 to 9 inches (150 to 230 mm) or more, covered an area from southern Illinois into northwestern Pennsylvania. Louisville, Kentucky, experienced the storm's heaviest recorded rainfall rate of 1.05 inches (27 mm) in twenty-eight minutes on March 25.

Other factors contributing to the extensive flooding were the storm's size, its duration, and existing ground conditions. Rivers and streams affected by the flood were at near normal or below flood stage levels two days prior to the major flooding in Indiana and Ohio. Some experts argue that the ground may have become quickly saturated, resulting in runoff and flash flooding. Others have suggested that frozen ground in tributary watersheds contributed to the flooding along the rivers. Up to 8 inches (200 mm) of snow followed the heavy rain in northern Indiana. In some areas thawed ground and a lack of snowpack may have minimized the destruction from runoff and flooding.

=== Watersheds ===
Rivers rose several feet above previous high-water marks in Ohio and Indiana after heavy rains at the headwaters of the region's rivers moved downstream. The area's rivers experienced heavy runoff, especially along the Muskingum, Scioto, Great Miami, and Wabash rivers. The Scioto River basin in central Ohio recorded a flood level of 21 feet (6.4 m), which remains a record nearly 4 feet (1.2 m) higher than its other recorded floods. The Great Miami River and its tributaries, including the Whitewater River in Indiana, rose at least 10 feet (3.0 m) higher than previous flood levels in many locations. Downstream from Indiana and Ohio, where the Ohio River enters the Mississippi River at Cairo, Illinois, the water level reached 54.7 feet (16.7 m) and broke record highs to that time. High waters continued to flow south to the Gulf of Mexico, causing some levees to fail in Arkansas, Kentucky, Louisiana, Mississippi, and Missouri. Water from flood-crested rivers flowing into the Mississippi River in April set new height records downriver and caused cities such as Memphis, Tennessee; Natchez, Mississippi; New Orleans, Louisiana; and elsewhere along the Mississippi to prepare for flooding.

== Timeline ==
The storm system that produced the flood in late March began with a typical winter storm pattern, but soon developed special characteristics that promoted heavy precipitation.

Friday, March 21

- A series of nine tornadoes associated with the same weather system that produced the flood sweeps through the Gulf States of Alabama, Georgia, and Mississippi, leveling towns, killing 48 people, and injuring 150.
- A blizzard hits twenty states and kills 21 people.
- Temperatures drop below freezing in the Midwest, while hurricane-force winds move into Ontario, Canada. Record-setting winds reach 60 miles per hour (97 km/h) in Indianapolis, Indiana; 66 mph (106 km/h) in Louisville, Kentucky; 84 mph (135 km/h) in Toledo, Ohio; 86 mph (138 km/h) in Detroit, Michigan; and 90 mph (140 km/h) in Buffalo, New York.

Saturday, March 22

- Ice begins to melt and winds die down.

Sunday, March 23

- The storm gains strength. High winds and sleet in the Midwest topple buildings, telephone and telegraph poles, and overhead wires, disrupting electric services and severely limiting communications within the Midwest and with areas west of the Mississippi River.
- The storm keeps the U.S. Weather Bureau from collecting timely information about the weather system and communicating weather warnings in advance of the storm.
- A high-pressure system moves northeast over New England and a low-pressure system is over Colorado. Southerly winds increase between the two systems as warm and moist air enters the Great Plains and the Ohio River valley.
- Gusty winds produce a dust storm in Kansas, while Missouri is hit with hail and heavy rain, and a series of funnel clouds move across Nebraska, Iowa, Illinois, Missouri, Michigan, and Indiana. The number of tornadoes range from six to twelve, but at least six strike the Midwest, killing approximately 221 people and injuring 761.
- Major tornadoes hit Omaha, Nebraska. The event ranks as Nebraska's deadliest. A tornado hits Terre Haute, Indiana, that same evening.
- The storm moves into Michigan.
- Winds of 40 to 50 miles per hour (64 to 80 km/h), gusting up to 60 mph (97 km/h), are reported in Nebraska, Iowa, and Illinois.

Monday, March 24

- The first low-pressure system from the storm weakens and moves northeast from the Great Lakes into eastern Canada and New England.
- The system stalls over the Ohio River basin and triggers more rain and thunderstorms.
- A second low-pressure system that developed in Colorado merges with a third low that forms over western Texas.
- Overnight the first storm system moves eastward over Kentucky, while the second system enters southern Indiana and Illinois and merges with a stationary front over the Ohio River valley.
- Rainfall totals from Sunday through Monday, March 23 and 24, measure 3 to 8 inches (76 to 203 mm) in Ohio, Indiana, and southern Illinois, surpassing the normal monthly rainfall totals in less than forty-eight hours. Rain continues, averaging 3 to 6 inches (76 to 152 mm) in southern Indiana and western Ohio.
- Flooding moves into central Indiana. Waterways are at or near crest along the Wabash River from Logansport to Attica, the White River in the Indianapolis area, and the East Fork of the White River near Columbus and Seymour, Indiana. Eastern Indiana floods after the Maumee, Whitewater, and upper portions of the Wabash and White Rivers reach record high water levels.
- Heavy rain falls at Dayton, where the Great Miami River reaches a high stage for the year and continues to rise.

Tuesday, March 25

- The Ohio River and its tributaries flood cities such as Indianapolis, Indiana, and Cincinnati and Columbus, Ohio, and Fort Wayne, Indiana also suffers from high water.
- Rising water overflows and then bursts levees at Dayton, flooding its downtown business district, while water levels continue to rise.

Wednesday, March 26

- The low-pressure center moves east over New York as rain continues in the Ohio River valley.
- Floodwaters crest at Dayton; its downtown business district suffers further destruction from fires and a gas explosion.

Thursday, March 27

- Flooding in south central and southwest Indiana damages or destroys areas near Bedford, Shoals, Terre Haute, Vincennes, and Washington, after the Wabash, White, and East Fork of the White Rivers crest.
- Rainfall measures 2 to 5 inches (51 to 127 mm) over Kentucky and Tennessee.
- The storm trough moves eastward into Pennsylvania and New York and slowly ends the heavy rain over the Ohio River valley. In some areas snow replaces the rain. Up to 8 inches (200 mm) of snow fell in central and northern Indiana.
- Ohio governor James M. Cox appoints a Dayton Relief Commission.

Friday, March 28

- A cold system produces frost into the Gulf States, while heavy rains over the northeast cause flooding in New York, Massachusetts, Vermont, and Virginia.
- The Potomac River overflows its banks in Maryland, reaching a high of 18 feet (5.5 m), and floods Hagerstown. Other communities such as Cumberland, Maryland, feel the effects of the floods, which cause damage but no deaths.

== Relief efforts ==
In the immediate aftermath of the floods businesses and factories shut down, schools closed, government services were disrupted, and train travel was delayed or stopped throughout the Midwest. Newspapers in many communities were not published during the storm. Theaters around the country were showing pictures of the flood devastation in Dayton and other Ohio cities and tornado damage in Omaha, Nebraska, within weeks after the disaster.

In 1913, years before the federal government provided significant disaster relief, state and local communities handled their own disaster response and relief. Cleanup efforts were made even more difficult with increased fire and health risks, flood-damaged communications systems, disrupted transportation networks, debris-littered streets, and flooded utility systems.

The American Red Cross was still a small organization in March 1913, with a few full-time employees at its headquarters in Washington, D.C. and about sixty volunteer chapters in the United States, when President Woodrow Wilson named it "the official disaster-relief agency for the federal government". Flood reports in the country's newspapers carried an appeal from the president to help victims with contributions to the Red Cross. Wilson also sent telegrams to the governors of Ohio and Indiana asking how the federal government might help. Indiana governor Samuel M. Ralston did not receive President Wilson's telegram offering federal support due to flood-damaged communications. Ohio governor James M. Cox replied to the president with a request for tents, rations, supplies, and physicians and sent a telegram to the Red Cross requesting its assistance in Dayton and surrounding communities. Red Cross agents and nurses focused their efforts in 112 of Ohio's hardest-hit communities, which included Dayton, primarily along Ohio's major rivers. The Red Cross had less of a presence in Indiana, where it established a temporary headquarters in Indianapolis and served the six hardest-hit Indiana counties. Red Cross disaster relief in other regions of the United States, with the exception of Omaha, Nebraska, and Lower Peach Tree, Alabama, was limited or nonexistent.

Governor Cox called on the Ohio legislature to appropriate $250,000 ($8.14 million in 2025 dollars) for emergency aid and declared a 10-day bank holiday. Cox, who was also the publisher of the Dayton Daily News, provided the press with daily briefings and appeals for donations. Governor Ralston appealed to Indiana cities and other states for relief assistance and donations of money and supplies. Ralson appointed a trustee to receive relief funds and arrange for distribution of supplies. Approximately one-half of Indiana's counties cared for their own flood victims. Railroads, most notably "the Big Four, the Pennsylvania Lines, and the Vandalia," put their equipment at the Indiana governor's disposal and had work crews rebuild the state's rail network.

The Chicago Association of Commerce wired $100,000 to the Red Cross on March 26, becoming one of many organizations that contributed funds for flood relief. Rotary clubs across the United States contributed more than $25,000 ($814,000 in 2025 dollars) to a Rotary Relief Fund, which was established for flood relief in Indiana and Ohio. It was the organization's "first cooperative disaster relief effort". In some areas independent local organizations helped with relief efforts. The Rotary Club of Indianapolis, chartered just a few weeks before the flood, and the Rotary Club of Dayton, chartered six months earlier, assisted relief efforts within their communities by helping to provide medical support, transportation, and shelter. Other Rotary clubs in the United States and Canada donated funds, supplies, and medicine. In Colorado stage actress Sarah Bernhardt and fellow actor John Drew, Jr. gave a benefit performance that contributed $5,000 to a $41,000 relief fund already raised by Colorado residents for Indiana and Ohio flood victims.

== Deaths ==
The exact death toll from the flood and its aftermath may never be known. One estimate of storm-related deaths from March 21 to March 28 is more than 900. Flood deaths in Ohio, Indiana, and eleven other states (Arkansas, Illinois, Kentucky, Louisiana, Maryland, Michigan, Missouri, New York, Pennsylvania, West Virginia, and Wisconsin) are estimated at 650. This death toll places the flood of 1913 second to the Johnstown flood of 1889, when more than 2,200 people died, as one of the country's deadliest floods. Official reports of flood deaths are inconsistent. The bodies of some of the victims were never found and not all fatalities were reported to agencies collecting flood statistics. Some disaster-related deaths from injuries or illness were not listed in official counts if they occurred after publication of official reports. An estimate of 467 flood deaths has been quoted for Ohio, with the official death toll range between 422 and 470. Dayton's official death toll was not certain, but Ohio's Bureau of Statistics listed eighty-two people, while one flood historian puts the number at ninety-eight. Others reported Dayton's death toll at nearly 300, but this figure may have included other neighborhoods and cities. Estimated deaths for flood victims in Indiana is 100 to 200. Flooding in the Great Miami River basin caused at least 260 deaths, more than in any other river basin. Approximately seventeen people died in flooding in the Whitewater River basin.

== Disease related to the flood ==
Secondary to the flood itself, there were outbreaks of diphtheria and typhus in several flooded areas, such as the area in north-central Dayton, Ohio. It is likely that roughly 2000 additional hospitalizations were the result of these outbreaks, following the more directly physical damage of the flood. Although information for Indiana is not presently available, estimates are that an additional 1000 people were affected in that state.

== Damage estimates ==
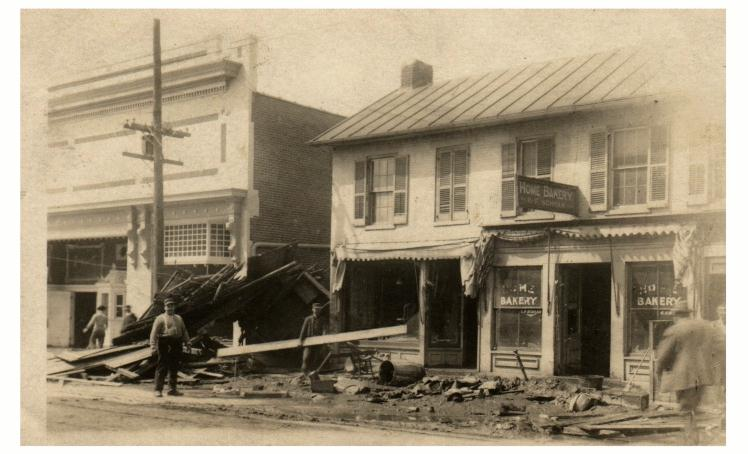
The aftermath of the Great Flood of 1913 in Miamisburg, Ohio, as seen in the destruction of buildings rubble in the streets.

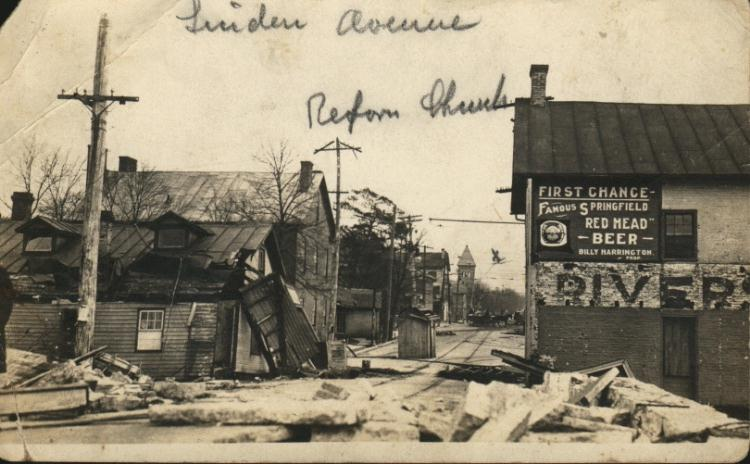
Damage in Miamisburg, Ohio after the flood

Damage from the flood was widespread and extensive. The storm destroyed hundreds of bridges and railroad trestles and 12,000 telegraph and telephone poles. Flooding stopped communications between Chicago and New York for a day and a half, disrupted road and rail transportation, and slowed mail delivery. More than 38,000 homes and other buildings, plus thousands of schools, businesses, utilities, and city streets were damaged or destroyed. More than a quarter million people were left homeless.

In the Midwest alone, damage estimates, which one flood historian suggests were understated, were more than "a third of a billion dollars." The Dayton Citizens' Relief Committee's report documented damage in Dayton in excess of $73 million. Damage in Indiana was estimated at $25 million in 1913 dollars. Cairo, Illinois, where its citizens had advance knowledge of the oncoming high water that arrived the week after the Dayton flood, reported no fatalities, but damage estimates there and in smaller communities such as Shawneetown, Illinois, and Caseyville, Kentucky, was in excess of $5 million. Along the Mississippi River damages exceeded $200 million. There were a number of other small communities that were completely devastated and did not report anything, either because they could not or would not. Most of these communities partially recovered, but a few never recovered at all, among these, Lyles Station, Indiana.

== Impact ==
Devastation from the flood of 1913 and later floods along the Mississippi River in 1917, 1927, 1936, and 1937, eventually changed the country's management of its waterways and increased congressional support beyond emergency flood assistance to include national flood control measures.

=== Federal legislation ===
Following the flood of 1913, citizens and government officials took a greater interest in comprehensive flood prevention, managing flood-prone areas, and funding for flood control projects that would limit damage and save lives. Congress previously contended that floods were local events and flood control was the responsibility of state and local government. The Flood Control Act of 1917 was the first of several pieces of legislation that eventually led to the creation of the National Flood Insurance Program of 1968, the Federal Emergency Management Agency (FEMA) in 1979, and the Robert T. Stafford Disaster Relief and Emergency Assistance Act of 1988. Federal funding for national flood control projects began slowly in 1917, with Congress authorizing funding for flood control studies in the Mississippi River as part of House Document 308. By 1925 it had been expanded to include other major rivers in the United States.

=== State and local programs ===
The Dayton Relief Committee began shortly after the flood of 1913 to raise $2 million to develop a comprehensive flood protection system that would prevent another flood disaster of the same magnitude. The committee hired Arthur Ernest Morgan and his Morgan Engineering Company from Tennessee to design a plan that used levees and dams. On March 17, 1914, the governor of Ohio signed the Ohio Conservancy Act, which allowed for the establishment of conservancy districts with the authority to implement flood control projects. Ohio's Upper Scioto Conservancy District was the first to form in February 1915. The Miami Conservancy District (MCD), which includes Dayton and surrounding communities, was the second, formed in June 1915. The MCD began construction of their flood control system in 1918. The project was completed in 1922 at a cost in excess of $32 million and has kept Dayton from flooding as severely as it did in 1913. The Ohio Conservancy Act became the model for other states, such as Indiana, New Mexico, and Colorado.

=== Commercial Canal Traffic ===
While canal systems had by and large fallen into disuse as a result of increased maintenance expense and competition from railroads and burgeoning highways, this disaster put the final nail in the coffin for some commercial canal use, especially in Ohio. The extent of damage to locks, holding pools, and the canals themselves in Indiana, Ohio, and Pennsylvania would have been prohibitive to repair, and thus resulted in the final abandonment of several canals in the northeastern United States, including the Miami and Erie Canal and the Ohio and Erie Canal.

== See also ==
- March 1913 tornado outbreak sequence
