= Loramie Creek AVA =

American Viticultural Area in Ohio

Coordinates: 40°16′47″N 84°18′26″W

Loramie Creek
- Wine region
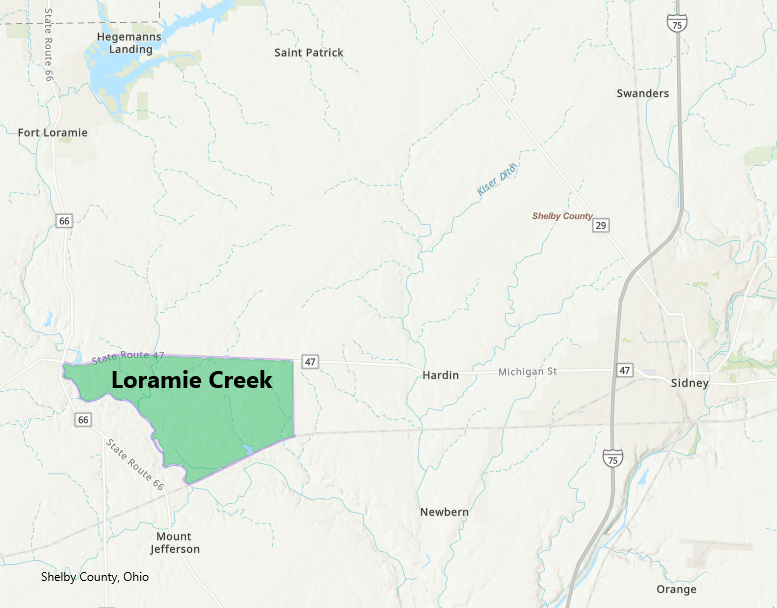
- Type: American Viticultural Area
- Year established: 1982
- Country: United States
- Part of: Ohio
- Growing season: 160 days
- Precipitation (annual average): 35.05 inches (890 mm)
- Soil conditions: clay, silty and clay loam glacial till
- Total area: 3,600 acres (5.6 sq mi)
- Size of planted vineyards: 46 acres (19 ha)
- No. of vineyards: 2
- Grapes produced: Baco Noir, Vidal
- No. of wineries: 0

Loramie Creek is an American Viticultural Area (AVA) located in Shelby County, Ohio. It was established as the nation's 22^{nd} and Ohio's second appellation on November 25, 1982 by the Bureau of Alcohol, Tobacco and Firearms (ATF), Treasury after reviewing the petition submitted by Mr. Homer K. Monroe, proprietor of the Vinterra Farm Winery and Vineyard in Houston, Ohio, proposing the viticultural area in Shelby County, to be named "Loramie Creek."

The diminutive 3,600-acre (6 sq mi) area lies between Loramie Creek and Turtle Creek. These are both tributaries of the Great Miami River, itself a tributary of the Mississippi River. The viticultural area is located southwest of the county seat of Sidney. Some of Ohio's best red wines are proclaimed to come from the Loramie Creek appellation made from Baco Noir, a Franco-American hybrid grape variety. At the outset, the area had two operating wineries with vineyards growing French hybrid grapes. These wineries comprised 16 acres (6.5 ha) in production with a projection of 30 more acres (12 ha) to be planted within the next five years. However, as of 2026, there are no wineries operating within the AVA's boundaries.

== Name Evidence ==
The name "Loramie Creek" (/lɔːrɑːmi/ lor-uh-mee) is well known in Shelby County and counties to the north, south, and west; that it is associated with the historical significance of Fort Loramie, Lake Loramie, the Miami-Erie Canal, and surrounding places; and that it is the largest tributary in Shelby County and drains a well-defined valley.

== Terroir ==
The elevation of the viticultural area varies from 940 to 1,000 feet (290 to 300 m) above sea level. The entire viticultural area is Glynwood-Blount Soil Association. This association is typified mostly by gently sloping to sloping topography of uplands, moderately well drained and somewhat poorly drained upland soils formed in clay loam or silty clay loam glacial till; and it is used mainly for cultivated crops and pastures. The average precipitation is 35.05 inches (890 mm) and the average daily temperature for the area is 51 °F (11 °C) with a low average daily temperature of 25.5 °F (−3.6 °C) in January and a high average daily temperature of 73.2 °F (22.9 °C) in ]uly. The USDA plant hardiness zone is 6a.
