= Dry dam =

Flood control structure

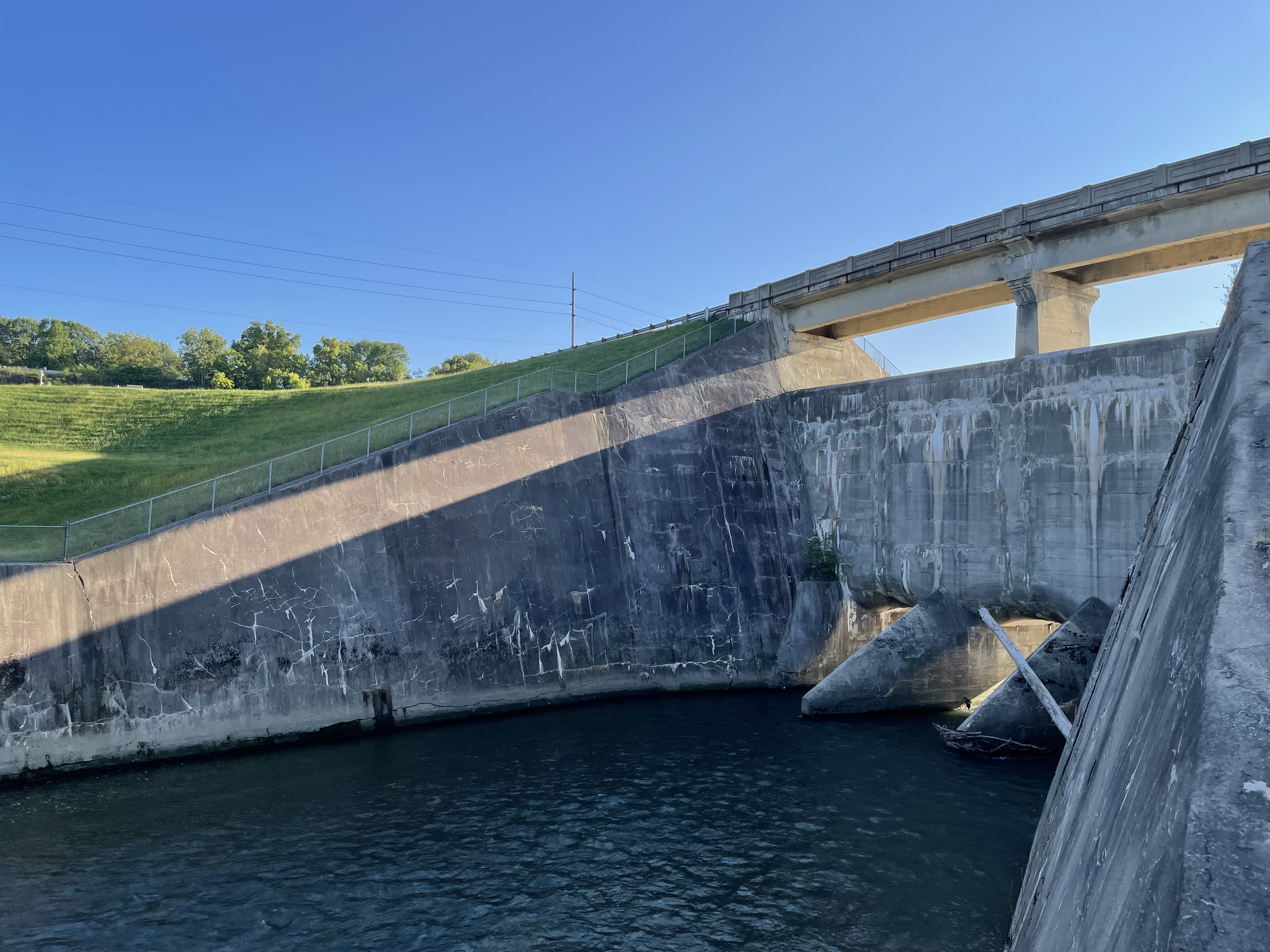
Huffman Dam - a part of the Miami Conservancy District. The Mad River flows freely until the water level rises.

A dry dam is a dam constructed for the purpose of flood control. Dry dams typically contain no gates or turbines, and are intended to allow the channel to flow freely during normal conditions. During periods of intense rainfall that would otherwise cause floods, the dam holds back the excess water, releasing it downstream at a controlled rate.

Development of dry dams was pioneered by the Miami Conservancy District which built five such dams on tributaries to the Great Miami River to prevent flooding of the Miami Valley and Dayton, Ohio.

== See also ==
- Levee
- Hydrology
