= Twin Creek (Ohio) =

Stream in Ohio, U.S.

Coordinates: 39°32′42″N 84°20′55″W

Twin Creek is a stream in the U.S. state of Ohio. The 46.2-mile-long (74.4 km) stream is a tributary of Great Miami River. Aukerman Creek, Bantas Fork, Lesley Run, Millers Fork, Price Creek, Swamp Creek, and Toms Run are tributaries of Twin Creek.

Twin Creek was so named by the Potawatomi Indians on account of its branches.

At its mouth, the creek's estimated mean annual flow rate is 323.2 cubic feet per second (9.15 m^{3}/s). A USGS stream gauge on the creek near Germantown recorded a mean annual discharge of 286.2 cu ft/s (8.10 m^{3}/s) during water years 1921–2019. The highest daily mean discharge during that period was 8,450 cu ft/s (239 m^{3}/s) on January 22, 1959. The lowest daily mean discharge was 2 cu ft/s (0.057 m^{3}/s) on September 25, 1941.

== See also ==
- List of rivers of Ohio
