= Lockington Locks =

- Lockington Locks Historical Area
- U.S. National Register of Historic Places
- U.S. Historic district
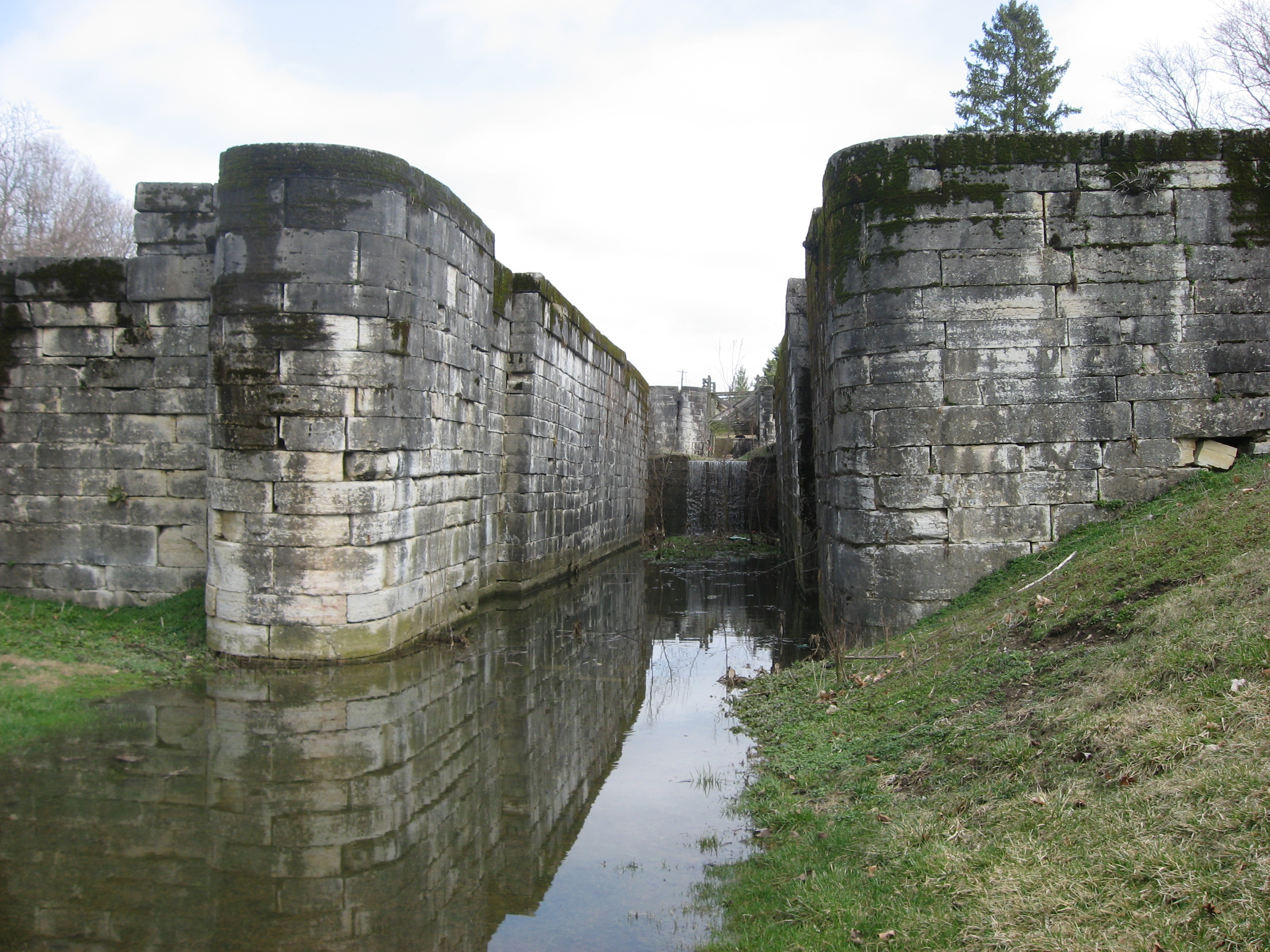
- Southern end of Lock One after a rainstorm

- Location within Ohio Location within the United States
- Location: Miami and Erie Canal between Lockington and Washington Township
- Nearest city: Lockington
- Coordinates: 40°12′34″N 84°14′38″W
- Area: 45 acres (18 ha)
- Built: 1833
- NRHP reference No.: 69000147
- Added to NRHP: December 17, 1969

The Lockington Locks are a group of canal locks on the former Miami and Erie Canal in Lockington, Ohio, United States. Built beginning in 1833, the locks opened for regular use in 1845. The system consists of seven locks: six together at one end, and a seventh at the southern end. Along with features such as basins to allow canal boats to turn around, the locks stretch for 3.75 miles (6.04 km) between Lockington in far southern Shelby County and Washington Township in far northern Miami County.

== Construction ==
As constructed, the locks were at the southern end of the Loramie Summit, which stretches 21 miles (34 km) from Lockington north to New Bremen. Lockington was a leading point on the canal: besides its locks, the village is the site of the junction of the canal with Loramie Creek, which it originally spanned with an aqueduct, and the village lay at the end of a feeder line that brought large amounts of water from the Lewistown Reservoir near Ohio's highest point in nearby Logan County. This small canal was designed to meet the main line at Lockington because the Summit included the canal's highest elevation of 944 feet (288 m) above sea level. As canal boats came north to Lockington, they were lifted by 67 feet (20 m): Lock 48, 10 feet (3.0 m); Lock 49, 11 feet (3.4 m); Lock 50, 11 feet (3.4 m); Lock 51, 11 feet (3.4 m); Lock 52, 12 feet (3.7 m); and Lock 53, 12 feet (3.7 m). Boats would typically take several hours to pass through the locks; as a result, the village of Lockington (originally named "Locksport") was founded to provide services to idle boatsmen and passengers. The individual locks at Lockington were constructed of large limestone blocks weighing as much as 500 pounds (230 kg); their floors were wooden, and their gates were made of white oak.

== Later history ==
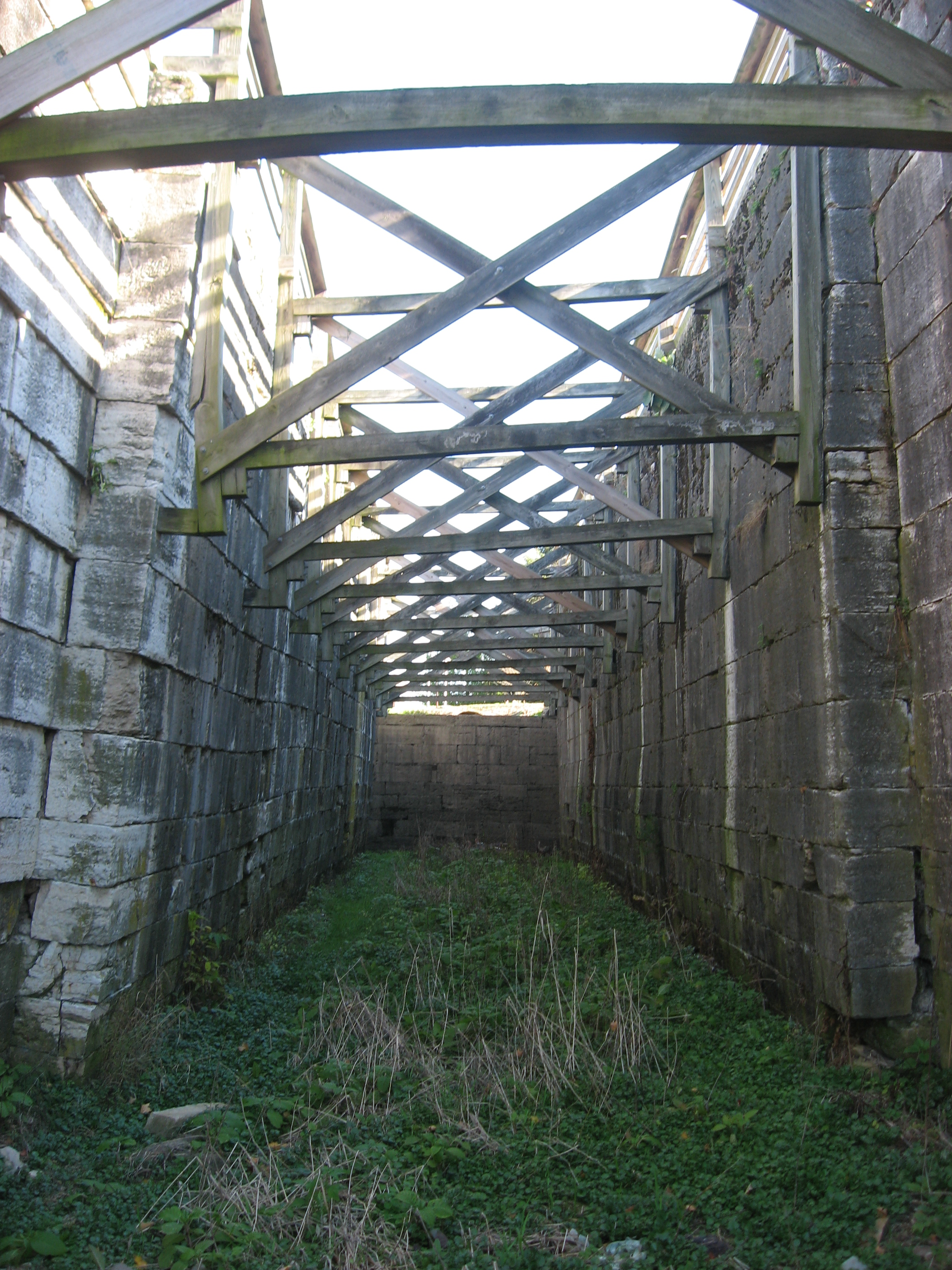
Interior of Lock One

The most prosperous point in the history of Ohio's canal system was reached in 1855. After that year, revenues fell steadily because of competition from railroads; even small communities such as Lockington had railroad stations, and water sales became the canal's primary revenue stream. Restorations were attempted in the 1900s, but all attempts at refurbishing the system ended after a disastrous 1913 flood that destroyed many of the canal's components and ended all hopes of its future commercial use. Today, the Lockington Locks and the surrounding land are a park, and the only water that flows through the locks is runoff from heavy rains. The countryside surrounding the locks is scenic enough that the future may see the conversion of its towpath into a hiking trail.

== Recognition ==
In 1969, the Lockington Locks were listed on the National Register of Historic Places, becoming the first location to receive this distinction either in Miami County or in Shelby County. Other canal-related sites in both counties were later added to the Register: the Piqua Historical Area State Memorial and the Twin Arch Stone Culvert in Miami County were listed in 1971 and 1978 respectively, and the Turtle Creek Culvert and Embankment in Shelby County was listed in 1978, although it was removed from the Register just seven years later. The locks qualified for inclusion on the Register both as an important engineering accomplishment and because of their place in the area's history: they were deemed to be significant both in Ohio's history and in that of the entire country. Lockington Locks are owned by the Ohio History Connection.
