= Goose Creek (Ohio) =

Stream in Preble County, Ohio, U.S.

Goose Creek is a stream in Preble County, Ohio, in the United States. It is a 5.1 mile-long tributary of Bantas Fork.

Goose Creek was named from the fact a family of settlers allowed their geese to roam its banks.

== Location ==
- Mouth: Northeast of Eaton, Ohio at 39°46′43″N 84°36′15″W
- Source: North of Eaton, Ohio at 39°50′50″N 84°39′42″W

== See also ==
- List of rivers of Ohio
