= Great Dayton Flood =

Natural disaster in Ohio, US in 1913

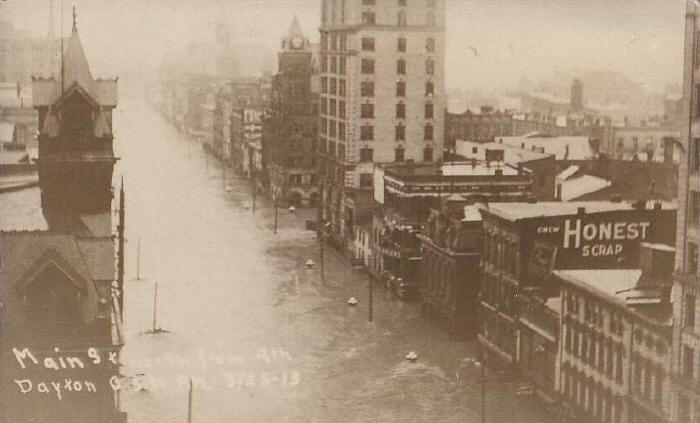
- Main Street in Dayton, Ohio, during the flood

Meteorological history
- Duration: March 21–26, 1913

Overall effects
- Fatalities: est. 360
- Damage: $100,000,000
- Areas affected: Dayton, Ohio, and other cities in the Great Miami River watershed

The Great Dayton Flood of 1913, part of the Great Flood of 1913, resulted from flooding by the Great Miami River reaching Dayton, Ohio, and the surrounding area, causing the greatest natural disaster in Ohio history. In response, the General Assembly passed the Vonderheide Act to enable the formation of conservancy districts. The Miami Conservancy District, which included Dayton and the surrounding area, became one of the first major flood control districts in Ohio and the United States.

The flood was caused by a series of severe winter rainstorms that hit the Midwest in late March. Within three days, 8–11 inches (200–280 mm) of rain fell throughout the Great Miami River watershed on already saturated soil, resulting in more than 90 percent runoff. The river and its tributaries overflowed. The existing levees failed, and downtown Dayton was flooded up to 20 feet (6 m) deep. This flood is still the flood of record for the Great Miami River watershed. The volume of water that passed through the river channel during this storm equaled the monthly flow over Niagara Falls.

The Great Miami River watershed covers nearly 4,000 square miles (10,000 km^{2}) and 115 miles (185 km) of channel that feeds into the Ohio River. Other Ohio cities also had flooding from these storms but none as extensive as those along the Great Miami, which included Dayton, Piqua, Troy, and Hamilton.

== Background ==
Dayton was founded along the Great Miami River at the confluence of its three tributaries: the Stillwater River, the Mad River, and Wolf Creek. Dayton's central business district developed within 1 mile (1,600 m) of the confluence of these waterways. When Israel Ludlow laid out Dayton in 1795, the local Indigenous Peoples warned him about the recurring flooding.

Prior to the 1913 flood, the Dayton area had suffered major floods nearly every other decade, with major water flows in 1805, 1828, 1847, 1866, and 1898. Most of downtown Dayton was built in a natural flood plain, which seemed advantageous in the early years when cities depended on rivers for transportation needs.

The storms that caused the flood at Dayton continued over several days and affected an area across all or parts of more than a dozen states, most notably states in the Midwest and along the Mississippi River. Heavy rain and snow saturated the soil and produced widespread flooding, known as the Great Flood of 1913, across Indiana, Ohio, Kentucky, New York, and Pennsylvania.

== Timeline ==
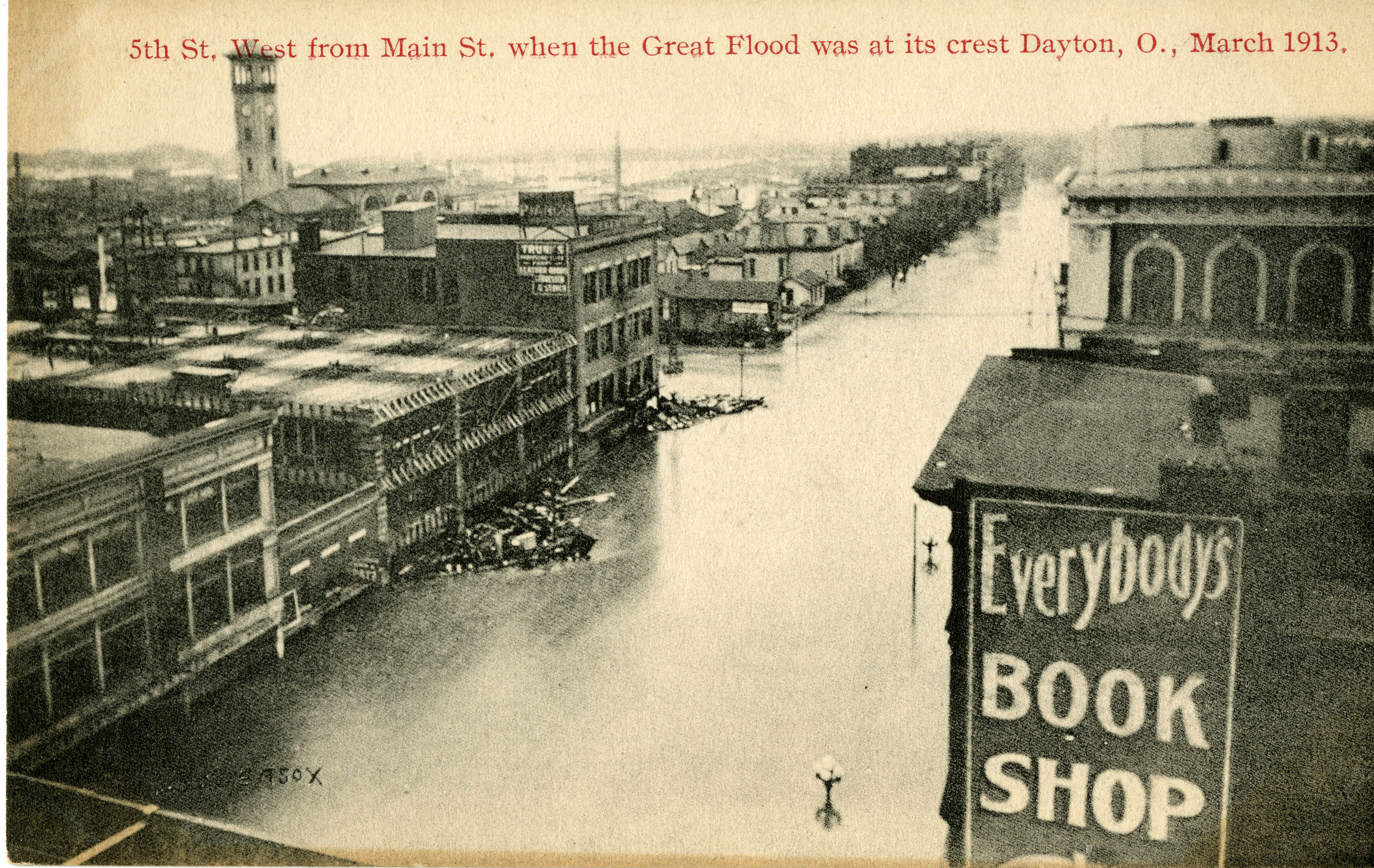
Postcard showing Fifth Street looking west from Main Street on March 26, 1913, when the flood was at its crest

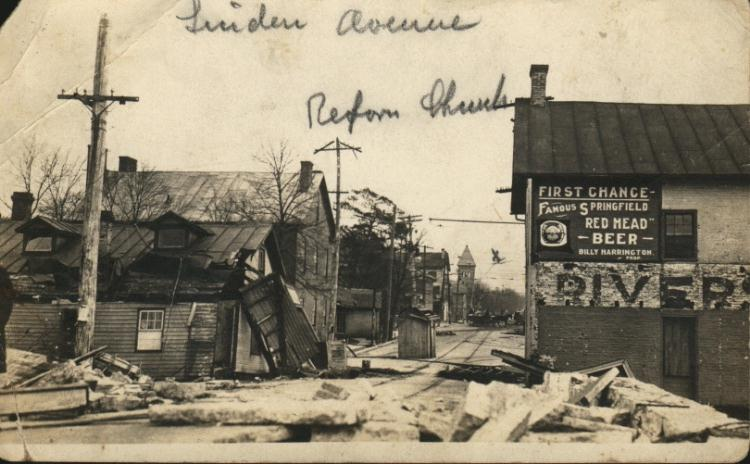
View of rubble on Linden Avenue after the 1913 flood

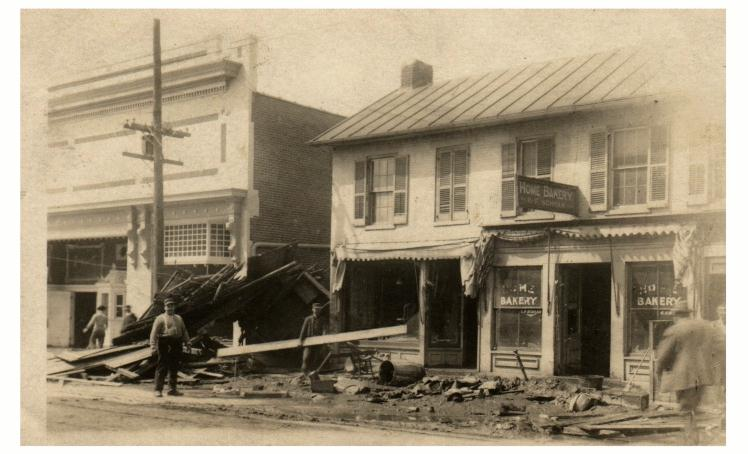
View of aftermath of the 1913 flood

The following events took place in Dayton between March 21 and March 26, 1913.

Friday, March 21

- The first storm arrives with strong winds and temperatures around 60 °F (16 °C).

Saturday, March 22

- The area experiences a sunny day until the second storm arrives, dropping temperatures to around 25 °F (−4 °C), which causes the ground to briefly freeze on the surface during the morning and thaw by late afternoon.

Sunday, March 23 (Easter Sunday)

- The third storm brings rain to the entire Ohio River valley. The soil was saturated, and nearly all the rain becomes runoff, flowing into the Great Miami River and its tributaries.

Monday, March 24

- After a day and night of heavy rains, with precipitation between 8 and 11 inches (200 and 280 mm), the river reaches its high stage for the year at 11.6 feet (3.5 m) and continues to rise.

Tuesday, March 25

- Midnight—The Dayton police are warned that the Herman Street levee was weakening, and they start the warning sirens and alarms.
- 5:30 am—City engineer Gaylord Cummin reports that water is at the top of the levees and the river is flowing at 100,000 cubic feet per second (2,800 m^{3}/s), an unprecedented rate.
- 6:00 am—Water overflowing the levees begins to stream along the city streets.
- 8:00 am—Levees on the south side of the downtown business district fail, and flooding begins downtown.
- Water levels continue to rise throughout the day.

Wednesday, March 26

- 1:30 am—The waters crest, reaching up to 20 feet (6 m) in the downtown area.
- Later that morning, a gas explosion occurs downtown, near the intersection of 5th Street and Wilkinson. The explosion starts a fire that destroys most of a city block. The open gas lines result in several fires throughout the city. The flooding prevents the fire department from reaching the fires, and many additional buildings are lost.

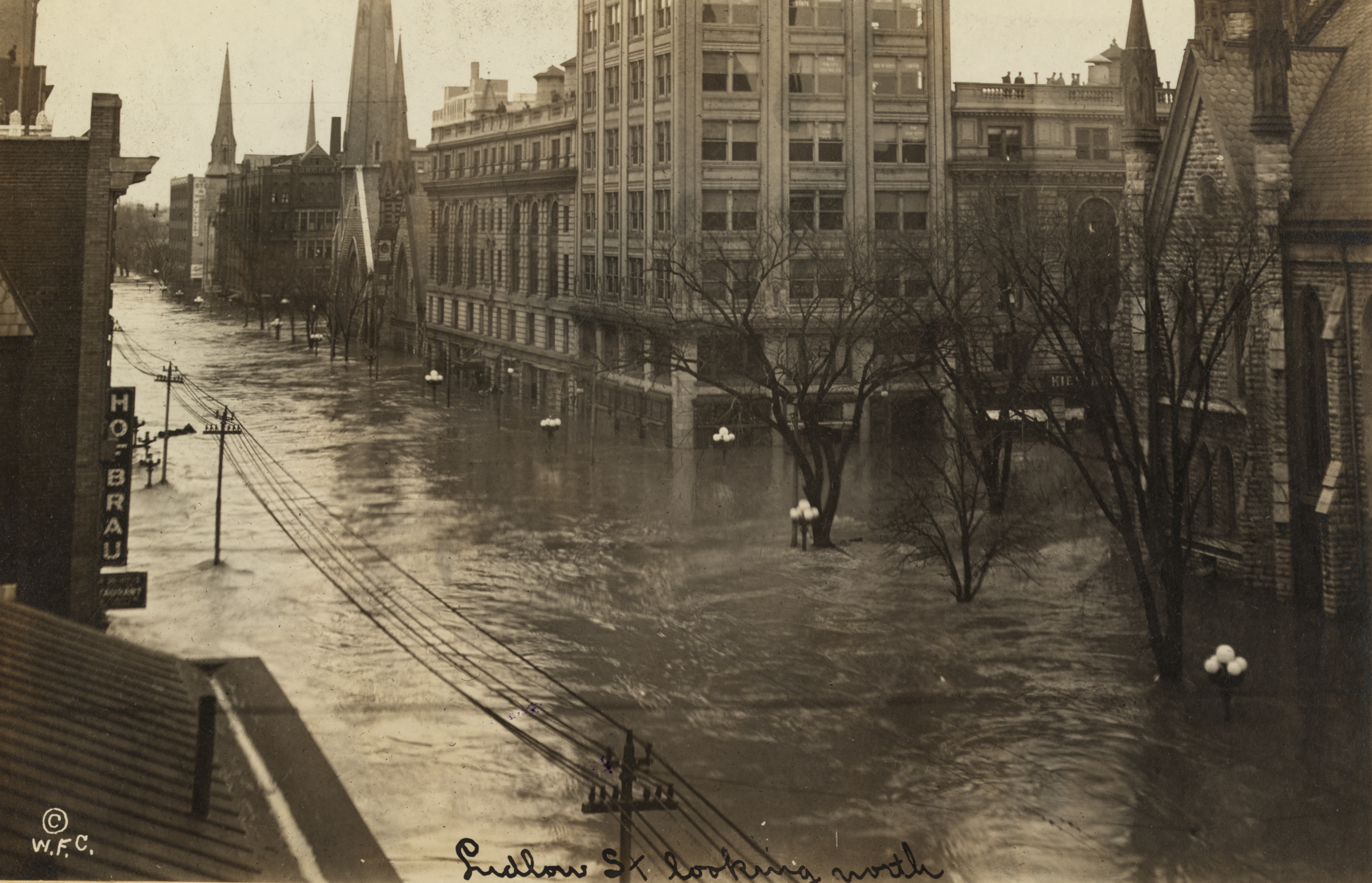
Flooding on Ludlow Street in downtown Dayton during the Great Dayton Flood

== Relief efforts ==
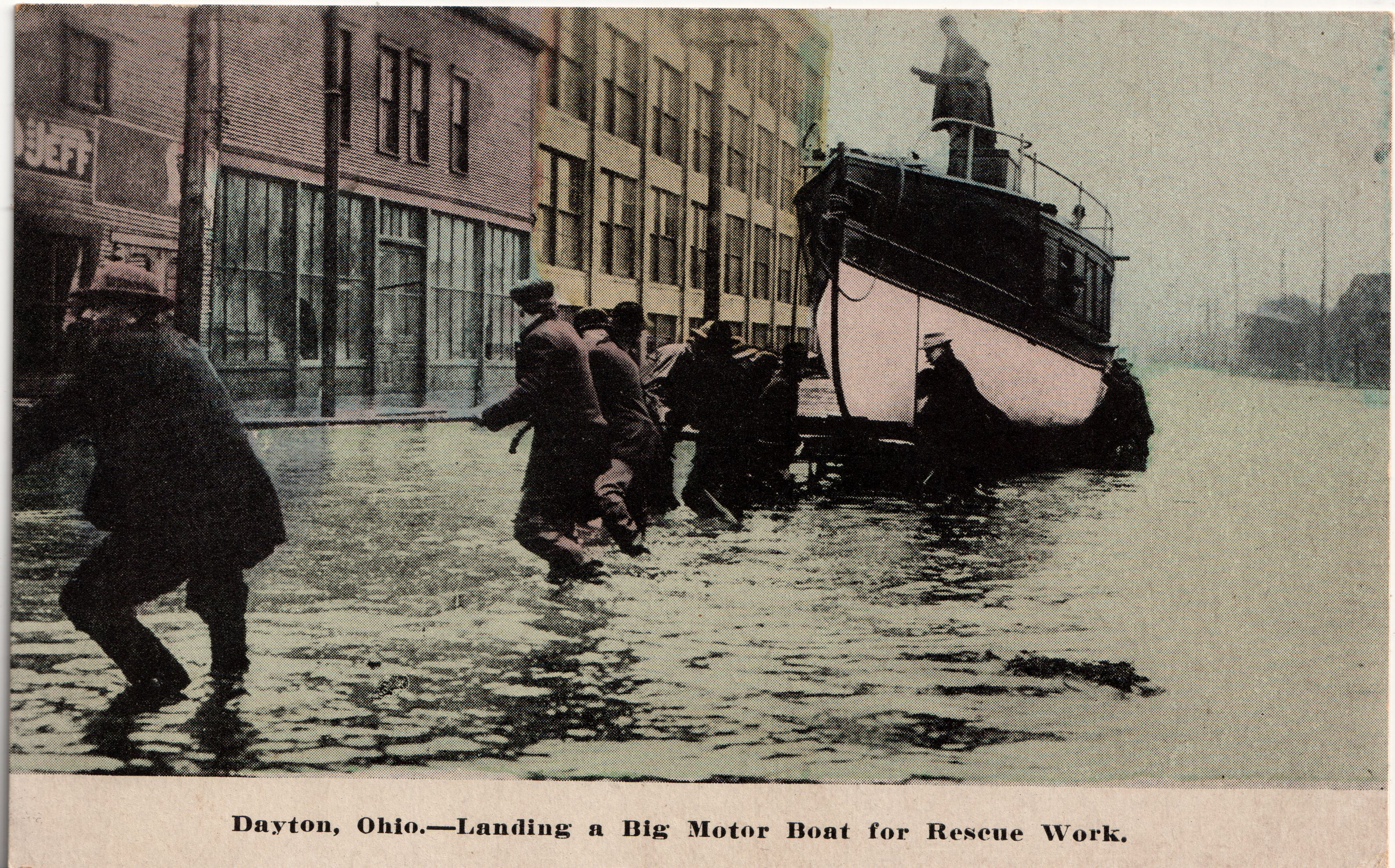
Landing a big motor boat for rescue work

Ohio Governor James M. Cox sent the Ohio National Guard to protect property and life and to support the city's recovery efforts. The guard was not able to reach the city for several days because of the high water conditions throughout the state. They built refugee camps, sheltering people in tents who had been permanently or temporarily displaced from their homes. Initial access was provided by the Dayton, Lebanon and Cincinnati Railroad and Terminal Company, the only line not affected by the flood.

Cox called on the state legislature to appropriate $250,000 ($5.8 million in 2024 dollars) for emergency aid and declared a 10-day bank holiday. When newly elected President Woodrow Wilson sent telegrams to the governors of Ohio and Indiana asking how the federal government might help, Cox replied with a request for tents, rations, supplies, and physicians. Cox sent a telegram to the American Red Cross headquarters in Washington D.C. requesting their assistance in Dayton and surrounding communities. Its agents and nurses focused their efforts in 112 of Ohio's hardest-hit communities, which included Dayton and others located primarily along Ohio's major rivers.

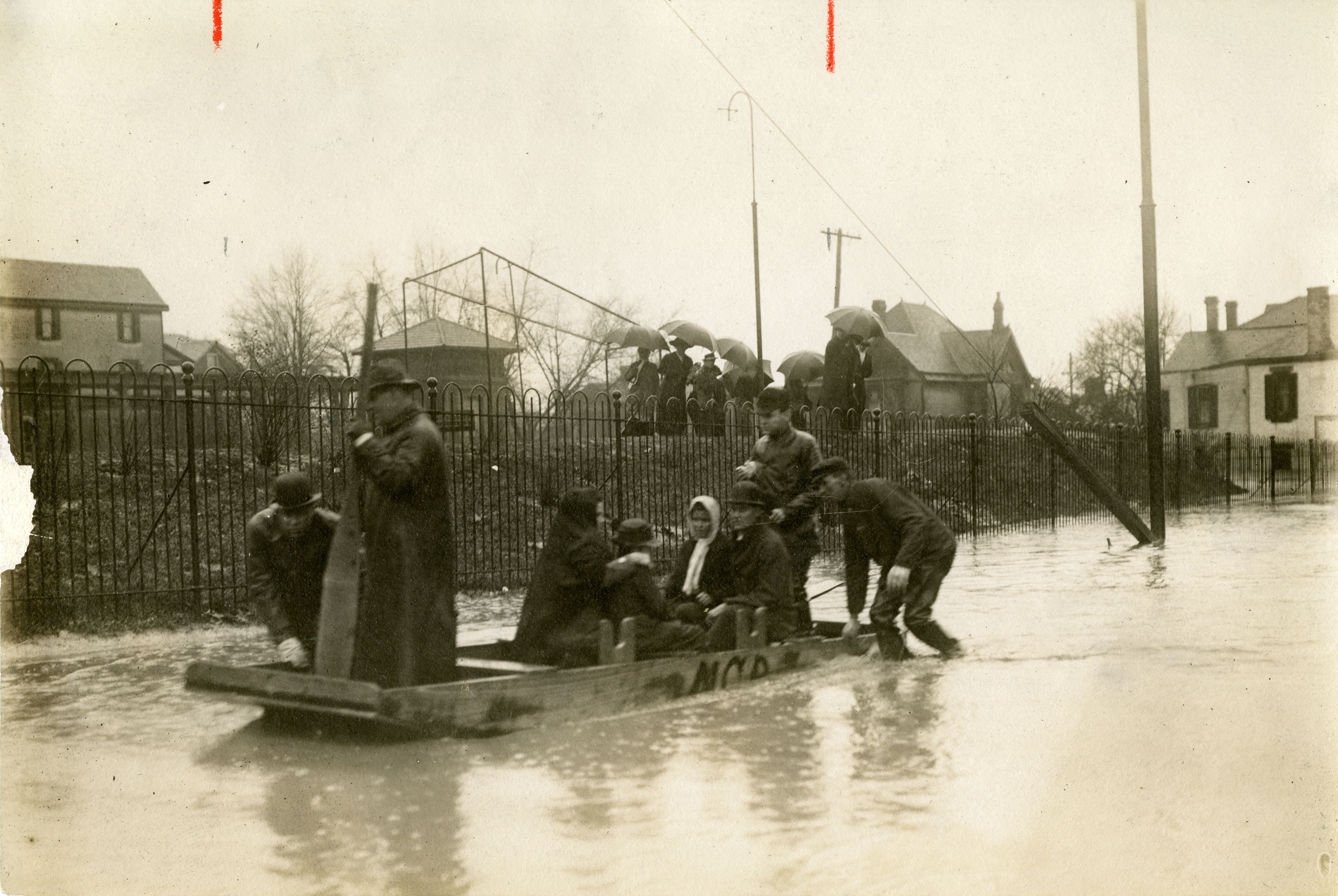
Four Dayton residents are escorted to safety in a boat provided by National Cash Register, as a group of onlookers watches from higher ground.

Some of the Dayton flood victims made their way to National Cash Register's (NCR) factory and headquarters, where John H. Patterson, the company's president, and his factory workers assisted flood victims and relief workers. NCR employees built nearly 300 flat-bottomed rescue boats. Patterson organized rescue teams to save the thousands of people stranded on roofs and the upper stories of buildings. He turned the NCR factory on Stewart Street into an emergency shelter, providing food and lodging. He organized local doctors and nurses to provide medical care. NCR facilities served as the Dayton headquarters for the American Red Cross and Ohio National Guard relief and rescue efforts and provided food and shelter, a hospital and medical personnel, and a makeshift morgue. The company's grounds became a temporary campground for the city's homeless. Patterson also provided news reporters and photographers with food and lodging and access to equipment and communications to file their stories. When the presses of the Dayton Daily News became inoperable due to the floodwaters, the newspaper used NCR's in-house printing press, providing Dayton and NCR with press coverage on AP and UPI newswires.

== Casualties and property damage ==
As the water receded, damages were assessed in the Dayton area:

- More than 360 people died.
- Nearly 65,000 people were displaced.
- Approximately 20,000 homes were destroyed.
- Buildings were moved off their foundations, and debris in the moving water damaged other structures.
- Property damages to homes, businesses, factories, and railroads were estimated at more than $100 million in 1913 dollars ($2.3 billion in 2024 dollars).
- Nearly 1,400 horses and 2,000 other domestic animals died.

Cleanup and rebuilding efforts took approximately one year to repair the flood damage. The economic impacts of the flood took most of a decade to recover. Destruction from the flood is also responsible for the dearth of old and historical buildings in the urban core of Dayton; its center city resembles that of newer cities established in the western United States. One of the victims was former Marquette University president Joseph F. Rigge.

== Aftermath ==
=== Civil engineering ===
The people of the Dayton area were determined to prevent another flood disaster of the same magnitude. Led by Patterson's vision for a managed watershed district, on March 27, 1913, Governor Cox appointed people to the Dayton Citizens Relief Commission. In May, the commission conducted a 10-day fundraiser, which collected more than $2 million ($47 million in 2024 dollars) to fund the flood control effort. The commission hired hydrological engineer Arthur E. Morgan and his Morgan Engineering Company from Tennessee to design an extensive plan based on levees and dams to protect Dayton from future floods.

Morgan hired nearly 50 engineers to analyze the Miami Valley watershed and precipitation patterns and to determine the flood volume. They analyzed European flood data for information about general flooding patterns. Based on this analysis, Morgan presented eight different flood control plans to Dayton officials in October 1913. The city selected a plan based on the flood control system in the Loire Valley in France. It consisted of five earthen dams and modifications to the river channel through Dayton. The dams would have conduits to release a limited amount of water, and a wider river channel would use larger levees supported by a series of training levees. Flood storage areas behind the dams would be used as farmland between floods. Morgan's goal was to develop a flood plan that would handle 140 percent of the water from the 1913 flood. The analysis had determined the river channel boundaries for the expected 1,000-year major floods, and all businesses located in that area were to be relocated.

The Miami Conservancy District began construction of its flood control system in 1918. Since 1922, when the project was completed at a cost in excess of $32 million, it has prevented Dayton from any flood as severe as that of 1913. Since its completion, the Miami Conservancy District has protected the Dayton area from flooding more than 1,500 times. Ongoing expenses for maintaining the district comes from property tax assessments collected annually from all property holders in the district. Properties closer to the river channel and the natural flood plain pay more than properties further away.

=== Vonderheide Act ===
With the support of Cox, Dayton attorney John McMahon worked on drafting the Vonderheide Act, Ohio's conservancy law, in 1914. The act allows local governments to define conservancy districts for flood control. Controversial elements of the act gives local governments the right to raise funds for the civil engineering efforts through taxes and grants eminent domain to support the purchase or condemnation of the necessary lands for dams, basins, and flood plains. On March 17, 1914, the governor signed the Ohio Conservancy Act, which allows for the establishment of conservancy districts with the authority to implement flood control projects. The act became the model for other states, such as Indiana, New Mexico, and Colorado. Ohio's Upper Scioto Conservancy District was the first to form in 1915. The Miami Conservancy District, which includes Dayton and surrounding communities, was also formed in 1915.

Morgan was appointed as the Miami Conservancy District's first chief engineer. The constitutionality of the act was challenged in Orr v. Allen, a lawsuit brought by a landowner affected by the exercise of eminent domain, and attempts were made to amend it through the Garver-Quinlisk bills. Legal battles continued from 1915 to 1919 and reached the U.S. Supreme Court, which upheld the law.

=== Osborn, Ohio ===
The village of Osborn, Ohio, which had little damage from the flood, was affected by the flood's aftermath. The village lay in the area designated to become part of the Huffman flood plain. The mainline tracks of the Erie Railroad, the New York Central Railroad, and the Ohio Electric Railway all ran through Osborn. As a result of establishing the conservancy area, the rail lines were moved several miles south out of the floodplain to run through Fairfield, Ohio.

The citizens of Osborn decided to move their homes instead of abandoning them. Nearly 400 homes were moved three miles (5 km) to new foundations along Hebble Creek next to Fairfield. Some years later, the two towns merged to create Fairborn, Ohio, with the name selected to reflect the merging of the two villages.

== Other losses ==
Orville and Wilbur Wright, who made their home in Dayton, had flown for the first time a decade earlier. They were developing aviation in their workshop and the area around Huffman Prairie adjacent to the planned Huffman Dam. They had meticulously documented the flight efforts by using a camera and had an extensive collection of photographic plates. The flood caused water damage in their workshop, creating cracks and blemishes on these photographic negatives. Prints made from the plates prior to the flood were of better quality than the prints made afterward, although the Wrights had made few of them before 1913. Images lost to flood damage were irreplaceable.

By 1913, the Miami and Erie Canal, though still intact, was barely used. To alleviate flooding conditions, local government leaders used dynamite to remove locks in the canal to allow the water to flow unimpeded. Sections of canal were also inundated and destroyed by nearby river flooding. Since they were no longer economically viable, Ohio's canals were simply abandoned except for limited sections that supplied water to industry.

== See also ==
- 1913 Omaha Easter Sunday tornado
- Disaster Books – The Great Dayton Flood
