= Lesley Run =

Stream in Ohio, U.S.

Coordinates: 39°42′59″N 84°31′13″W

Lesley Run is a stream in the U.S. state of Ohio. The 8.5-mile (13.7 km) long stream is a tributary of Twin Creek.

Lesley Run was named after a man named Leslie who drowned in its waters.

== See also ==
- List of rivers of Ohio
