= Bantas Fork =

Stream in Preble County, Ohio, U.S.

Coordinates: 39°42′53″N 84°31′27″W

Bantas Fork is a stream in Preble County, Ohio. The 16.8-mile (27.0 km) long stream is a tributary of Twin Creek. Goose Creek is a tributary of Bantas Fork

Bantas Fork was named for Albert Banta, a pioneer who settled there.

== See also ==
- List of rivers of Ohio
