= Millers Fork =

Stream in Ohio, U.S.

Coordinates: 39°51′18″N 84°31′54″W

Millers Fork is a stream in the U.S. state of Ohio. The 10.6-mile (17.1 km) long stream is a tributary of Twin Creek.

Millers Fork bears the name of an early settler.

== See also ==
- List of rivers of Ohio
