= Swamp Creek (Ohio) =

Stream in Preble County, Ohio, U.S.

Swamp Creek is a stream in Preble County, Ohio, in the United States.

Swamp Creek was named for the marshy land on its upper course.

== Location ==
- Mouth: Confluence with Twin Creek in Preble County northeast of Lewisburg 39°51′13″N 84°31′56″W
- Origin: Montgomery County northwest of Dayton 39°53′48″N 84°26′41″W

== See also ==
- List of rivers of Ohio
