= Miami Conservancy District =

River management agency in Ohio

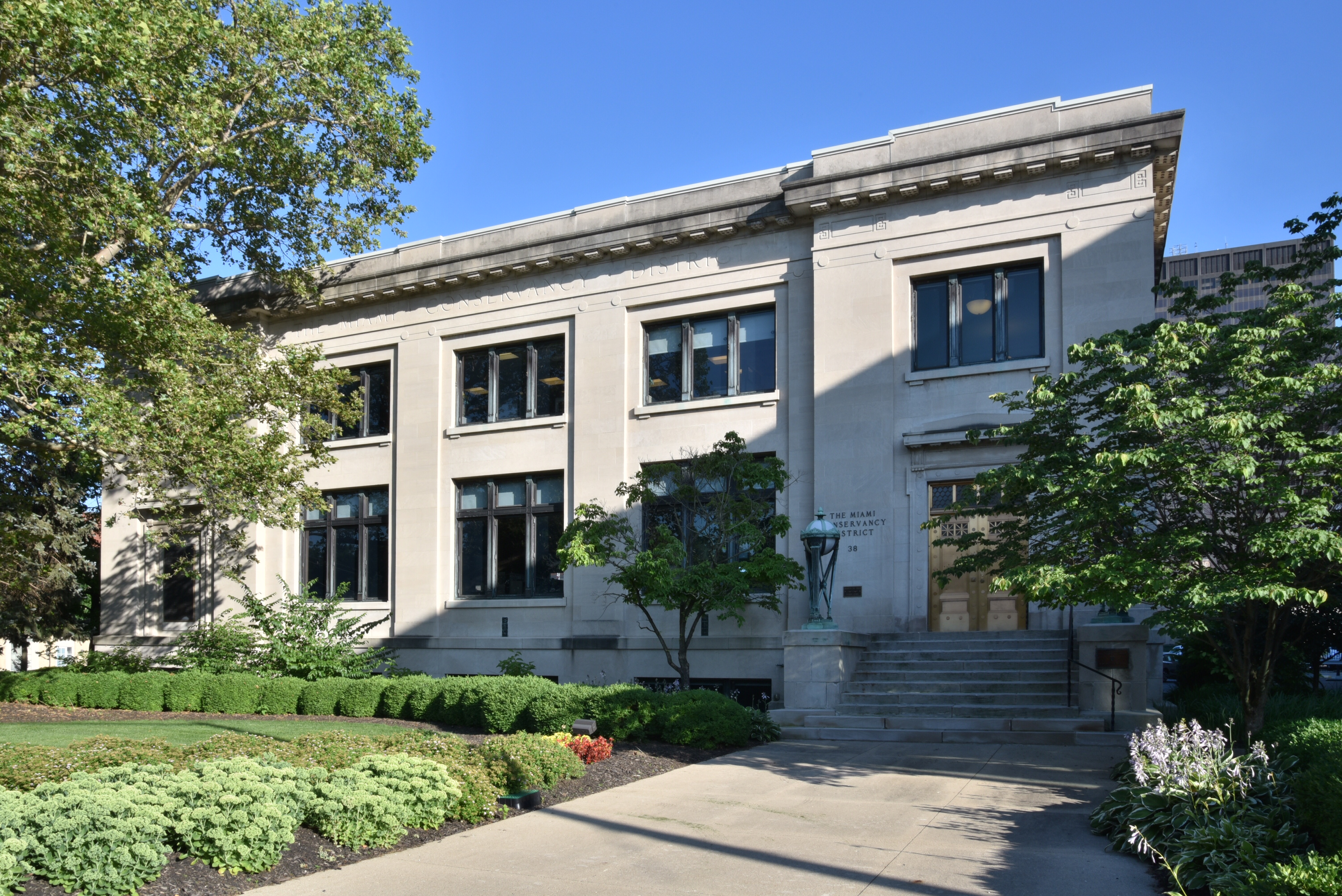
Miami Conservancy District Building (1915), 38 East Monument Avenue, Dayton, Ohio

The Miami Conservancy District is a river management agency operating in Southwest Ohio to control flooding of the Great Miami River and its tributaries. It was organized in 1915 following the catastrophic Great Dayton Flood of the Great Miami River in March 1913, which hit Dayton, Ohio particularly hard. Designed by Arthur Ernest Morgan, the Miami Conservancy District built levees, straightened the river channel throughout the Miami Valley, and built five dry dams on various tributaries to control flooding. The district and its projects are unusual in that they were funded almost entirely by local tax initiatives, unlike similar projects elsewhere which were funded by the federal government and coordinated by the U.S. Army Corps of Engineers.

== Historical perspective ==
The 1913 flood has been ascribed in part to the 1912 eruption of Mount Katmai and its daughter volcano Novarupta in Alaska. In one of the greatest recorded volcanic events, Novarupta emitted enough fine ash into the atmosphere to block sunlight and cool the climate of the Northern Hemisphere that winter.

The success of the Miami Conservancy District helped to inspire the development of the much larger Tennessee Valley Authority during the Great Depression. The district was designated as a National Historic Civil Engineering Landmark by the American Society of Civil Engineers in 1972.

== Dams ==
The district manages five dry dams. They are hydraulic fill dams constructed from 1919 to 1922 using fill trestles.

=== Englewood Dam ===
Located near Englewood, Englewood dam is the largest of the dams maintained by the district. It regulates the flow of the Stillwater River into the Great Miami River. It consists of 3,500,000 cubic yards (2,700,000 m^{3}) of earth, is 110 feet (34 m) high and stretches 4,716 feet (1,437 m). U.S. Route 40 crosses the top of the dam. The dam can contain 209,000 acre-feet (258,000,000 m^{3}) of flood water over 6,350 acres (26 km^{2}). It was constructed in 1919 and consists of as much earth as the Great Pyramid of Giza.

=== Germantown Dam ===
Located near Germantown, Germantown Dam regulates the flow of Twin Creek into the Great Miami River. It consists of 865,000 cubic yards (661,000 m^{3}) of earth, is 100 feet (30 m) high and 1,210 feet (370 m) wide. The dam can contain 73,000 acre-feet (90,000,000 m^{3}) of flood water over 2,950 acres (11.9 km^{2}) (12 km²). It was constructed in 1920.

=== Huffman Dam ===
Located near Fairborn, Huffman Dam regulates the flow of the Mad River into the Great Miami River. It consists of 1,665,000 cubic yards (1,273,000 m^{3}) of earth, is 65 feet (20 m) high and spans 3,340 feet (1,020 m). The dam can contain 124,000 acre-feet (153,000,000 m^{3}) of flood water over 7,300 acres (30 km^{2}).

Huffman Dam

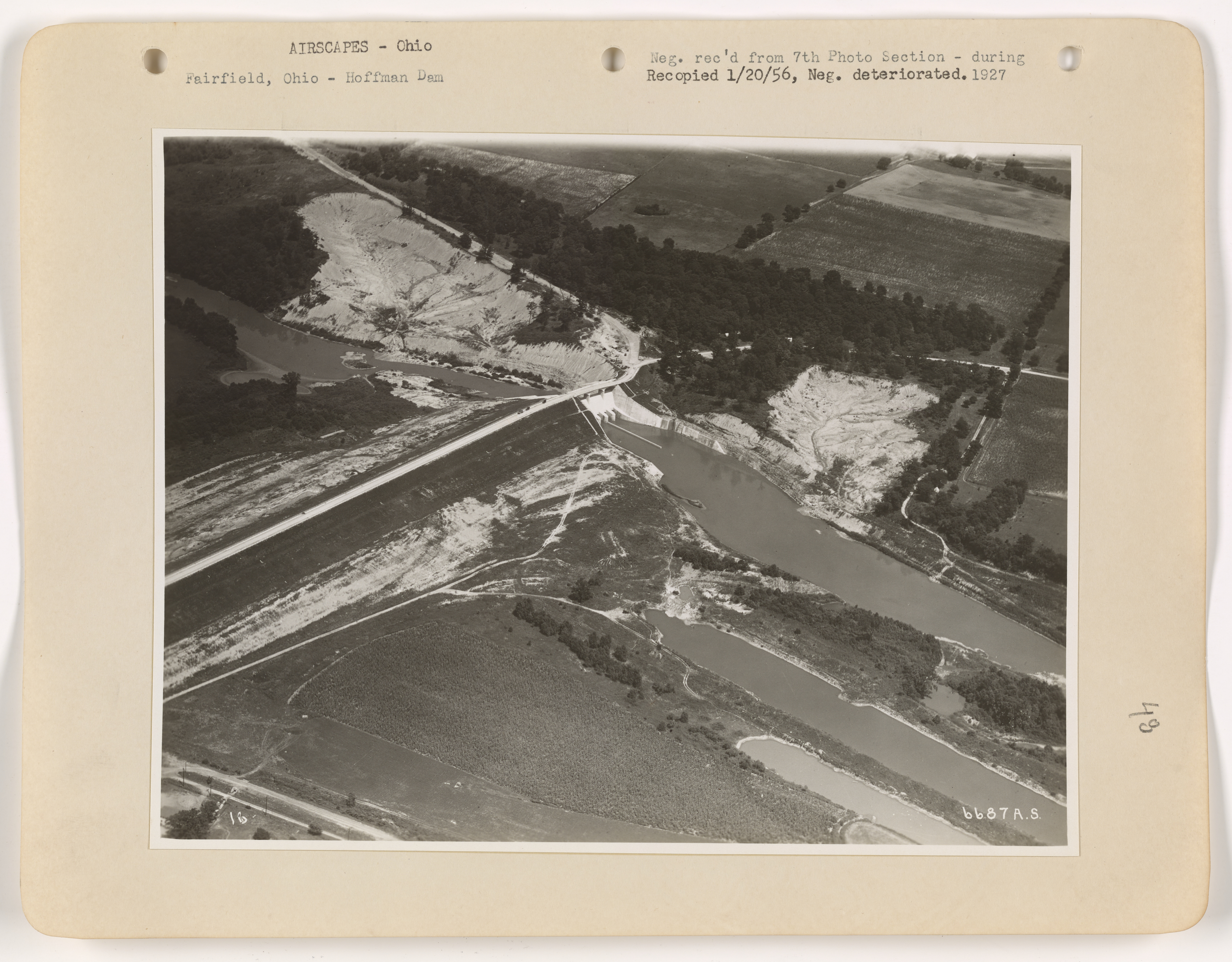
1927

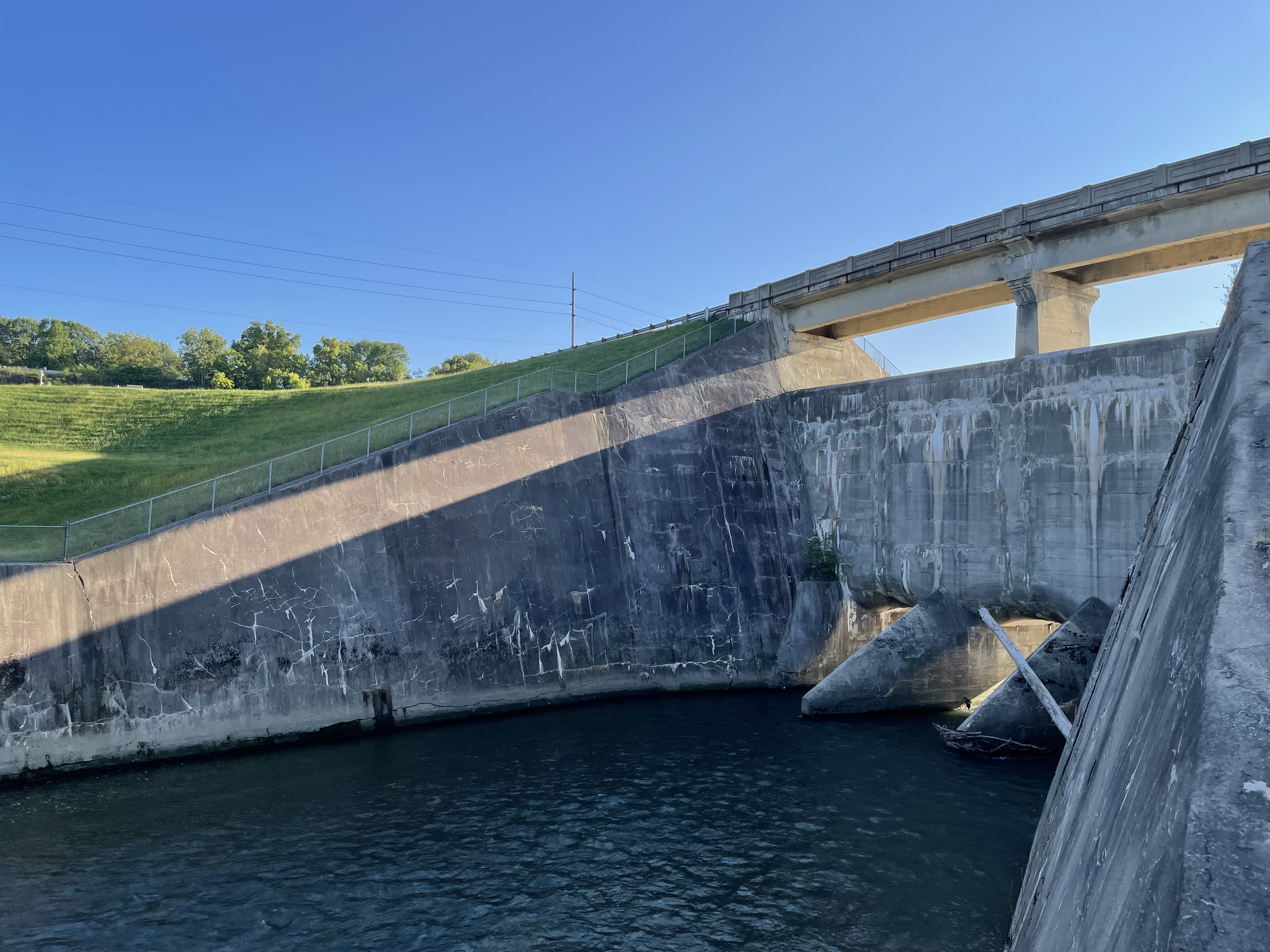
2022

=== Lockington Dam ===
Located north of Piqua outside the village of Lockington, Lockington dam regulates the flow of Loramie Creek into the Great Miami River. It consists of 1,135,000 cubic yards (868,000 m^{3}) of earth, is 69 feet (21 m) high and spans 6,400 feet (2,000 m). The dam can contain 63,000 acre-feet (78,000,000 m^{3}) of flood water over 3,600 acres (15 km^{2}) (15 km²). It was constructed in 1919.

=== Taylorsville Dam ===
Located near Vandalia, Taylorsville Dam regulates the Great Miami River. It consists of 1,235,000 cubic yards (944,000 m^{3}) of earth, is 67 feet (20 m) high and spans 2,980 feet (910 m). When full, the dam would inundate 9,650 acres (39.1 km^{2}) (39 km²). It was constructed in 1919. US 40 also runs across this dam.

== Recreation ==
The Miami Conservancy District (MCD) actively promotes and develops recreational amenities throughout the Great Miami River Watershed. MCD owns and/or maintains an extensive recreation trail system (nearly 34 miles) throughout Montgomery County. The trail system is part of a network of 340 miles of multi-use, paved path that connect Dayton east to Xenia and near Chillicothe and London, south to Franklin, west to near Greenville, and north to Piqua.

MCD maintains several boat ramps to encourage recreation on the Great Miami River Watershed waterways. MCD also offers river recreation maps to the Great Miami, Mad and Stillwater rivers which make up the national and state-designated Great Miami River Watershed Water Trail – the largest water trail system in Ohio. The trail collectively offers 291 miles of waterway accessible to recreational boaters, fishermen and wildlife watchers.

Low dams: MCD owns three low dams. Only Two-mile Dam in Hamilton is part of the flood protection system. The other low dams create a pool of water upstream of each dam for recreation, including boating and fishing. The cities of Hamilton, West Carrollton, and Moraine pay an assessment for MCD to maintain the recreational dams.

RiverWalk: The Dayton RiverWalk runs along the levee-top between the Main Street Bridge and the Monument Avenue (Dayton View) Bridge on each side of the Great Miami River. The total length of the lighted, crushed gravel walkway loop, including the two bridges, is about 1 mile. The walkway is easily accessible from the end of either bridge.

All of these projects were constructed and are maintained by funds separate from flood protection or groundwater assessments. Assessments to cities – as well as grants and other revenue sources – pay for the construction and maintenance of MCD recreation amenities.
