= Loramie Creek =

Coordinates: 40.18894°N 84.24217°W

Loramie Creek is a 40.0-mile-long (64.4 km) tributary of the Great Miami River in western Ohio in the United States. Via the Great Miami and Ohio rivers, it is part of the watershed of the Mississippi River, draining an area of 265 square miles (690 km^{2}). According to the Geographic Names Information System, the stream has also been known historically as "Laramie Creek," "Loramie Ditch," "Loramies Creek," and "Lonamie Creek." It is named after Louis Lorimier, a French-Canadian fur trader who had a trading post in the area in the 18th century.

Loramie Creek rises in northern Shelby County and initially flows southwestwardly, passing through a dam which causes the creek to form Lake Loramie, along which a state park is located. Near Fort Loramie the creek turns southeastwardly, flowing through Lockington Dam (a dry dam) and past the community of Lockington. It flows into the Great Miami River in northern Miami County, about 1 mile (2 km) north of Piqua.

At its mouth, the estimated mean annual discharge of the creek is 239.94 cubic feet per second (6.794 m^{3}/s), according to the US Environmental Protection Agency. A USGS stream gauge on the creek at Lockington recorded a mean annual discharge of 229.3 cubic feet per second (6.49 m^{3}/s) during water years 1921–2019. The highest daily mean discharge during that period was 6,570 cu ft/s (186 m^{3}/s) on July 10, 2003. The lowest daily mean discharge was 0.4 cu ft/s (0.011 m^{3}/s) on September 26, 2002.

== See also ==
- Loramie Creek AVA
- List of rivers of Ohio
