= Toms Run (New River tributary) =

Stream in West Virginia, U.S.

Coordinates: 37°32′24″N 80°54′15″W

Toms Run is a stream in the U.S. state of West Virginia. It is a tributary of the New River.

Toms Run was named from an incident when a settler named Thomas drowned in its waters.

== See also ==
- List of rivers of West Virginia
