= Aukerman Creek =

Stream in Preble County, Ohio, U.S.

Coordinates: 39°39′14″N 84°32′27″W

Aukerman Creek is a stream in Preble County, Ohio. The 5.6-mile (9.0 km) long stream is a tributary of Twin Creek.

Aukerman Creek bears the name of an early settler.

== See also ==
- List of rivers of Ohio
