= Toms Run (Twin Creek tributary) =

Coordinates: 39°39′47″N 84°26′40″W

Toms Run is a stream located entirely within Montgomery County, Ohio. The 13.5-mile (21.7 km) long stream is a tributary of Twin Creek.

Toms Run was named in honor of Tom Kilbuck, a Native American chieftain.

== See also ==
- List of rivers of Ohio
