= Toms Run (Clarion River tributary) =

Stream in Pennsylvania, U.S.

Coordinates: 41°19′55″N 79°12′25″W

Toms Run is a stream in Forest, Jefferson, and Clarion counties, in the U.S. state of Pennsylvania. It is a tributary of the Clarion River.

Toms Run was named after a Seneca Indian.

== See also ==
- List of rivers of Pennsylvania
- List of rivers in the United States
- List of canals in the United States
