= Mad River (Ohio) =

Coordinates: 39.76645°N 84.18688°W

- The Mad River flowing under Harshman Road in Riverside, Ohio

Physical characteristics
- Source
  - location: ~ 2 mi (3.2 km) northeast of Bellefontaine
  - elevation: ~ 1,450 ft (440 m)
- Mouth
  - location: Great Miami River at Dayton
  - elevation: ~ 750 ft (230 m)
- Length: 66 mi (106 km)
- Basin size: 657 mi^{2} (1,700 km^{2})
- Discharge
  - location: near Dayton
  - average: 757.4 cu ft/s (21.45 m^{3}/s), USGS water years 1974-2019

The Mad River (Shawnee: Hathennithiipi) is a stream located in the west central part of the U.S. state of Ohio. It flows 66 miles (106 km) from Logan County to downtown Dayton, where it meets the Great Miami River. The stream flows southwest from its source near Campbell Hill through West Liberty, along U.S. Route 68 west of Urbana, past Springfield (the point of confluence with Buck Creek), then along Ohio State Route 4 into Dayton. The stream's confluence with the Great Miami River is in Deeds Park.

The Mad River was one of the Great Miami River tributaries that flooded during the Great Dayton Flood of 1913, resulting in the creation of the Miami Conservancy District.

The river derives its name from its mad, broken, and rapid current. Christopher Gist, one of the first English explorers in the area, came upon the river while it was flooding and called it the "Mad River". Historically, the stream has also been known by the names Mad Creek and Tiber River, respectively, as well as by the Italian form of the name, Fiume Mad (lit. 'Mad River').

The first road between Cincinnati and Dayton that opened up the "Mad River Country" to European settlement was the Mad River Road, cut in 1795. Today, a ski resort named Mad River Mountain is located near the stream's source.

Mad River is the largest coldwater fishery in Ohio. The Ohio Department of Natural Resources's Division of Wildlife periodically stocks Mad River with rainbow trout and brown trout. The trout population suffers low reproduction rates due to sedimentation from channelization, extensive agricultural runoff, and diminishing habitat.

American psychedelic rock band Mad River, formed in nearby Yellow Springs, took their name from this river.

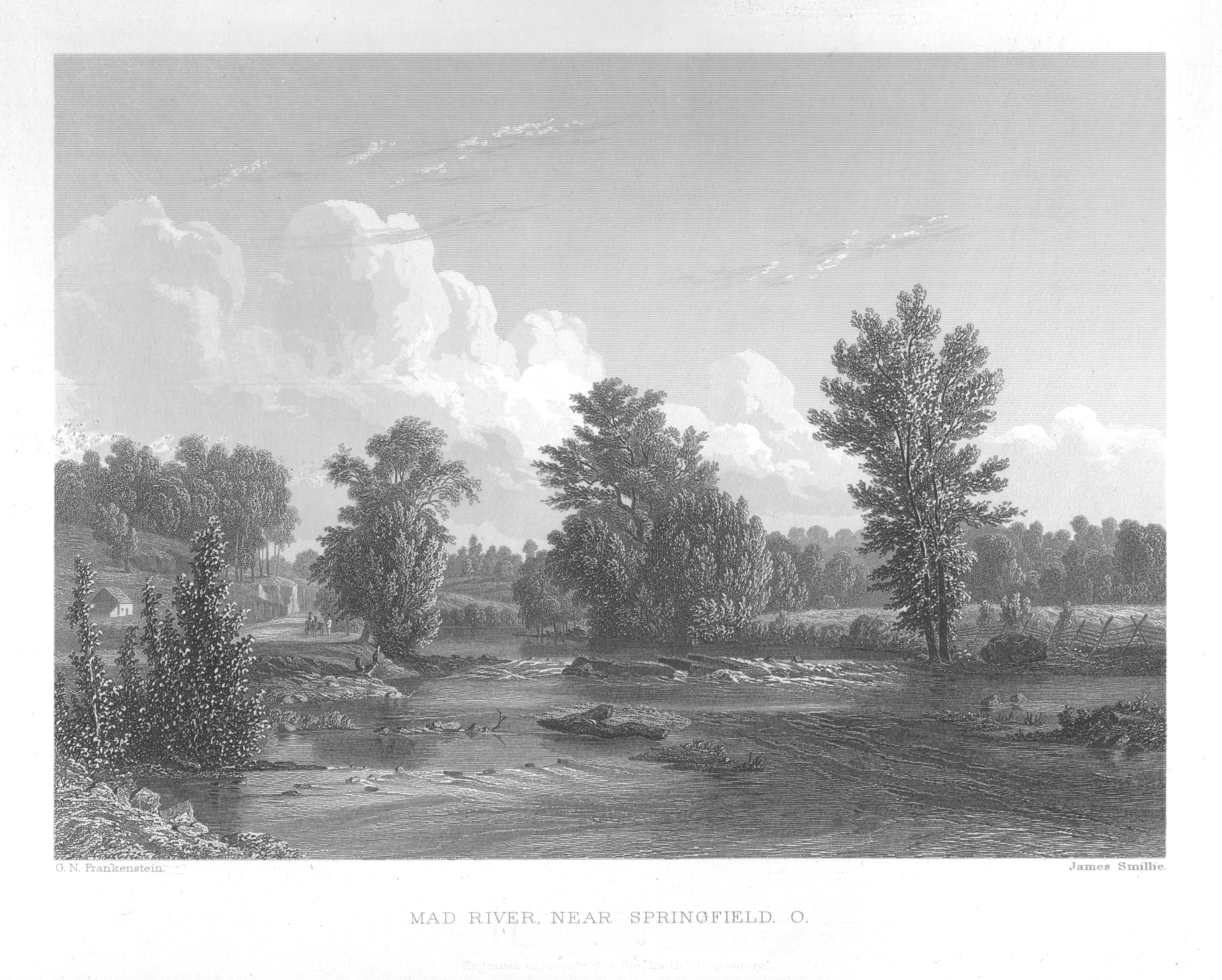
1857 etching of the Mad River near Springfield, Ohio by James Smillie from a painting by Godfrey Frankenstein.

== See also ==
- List of rivers of Ohio
- Fishing in Ohio
- Water pollution
