= Aukerman, Ohio =

Unincorporated community in Ohio, U.S.

Coordinates: 40°57′35″N 82°01′30″W

Aukerman is an unincorporated community in Wayne County, in the U.S. state of Ohio.

== History ==
Aukerman was platted at an unknown date. An old variant name was Burbank.
