= Little Toms Run =

Stream in West Virginia, U.S.

Coordinates: 39°53′23″N 80°42′04″W

Little Toms Run is a stream in the U.S. state of West Virginia.

Little Toms Run most likely was named after Thomas Smith, Sr., a local landowner.

== See also ==
- List of rivers of West Virginia
