= Price Creek (Iowa) =

Stream in Iowa, U.S.

Coordinates: 41°19′08″N 92°52′55″W

Price Creek is a stream in the U.S. state of Iowa. It is a 13-mile (21 km) long tributary to the Iowa River.

Price Creek is named after Abraham Price, a pioneer settler.
