= Price Creek (Ohio) =

Stream in Ohio, U.S.

Coordinates: 39°46′45″N 84°31′30″W

Price Creek is a stream in the U.S. state of Ohio. The 14.6-mile (23.5 km) long stream is a tributary of Twin Creek.

Price Creek was named for Henry Price, a pioneer who settled there.

== See also ==
- List of rivers of Ohio
