= Lockington, Ohio =

- Village
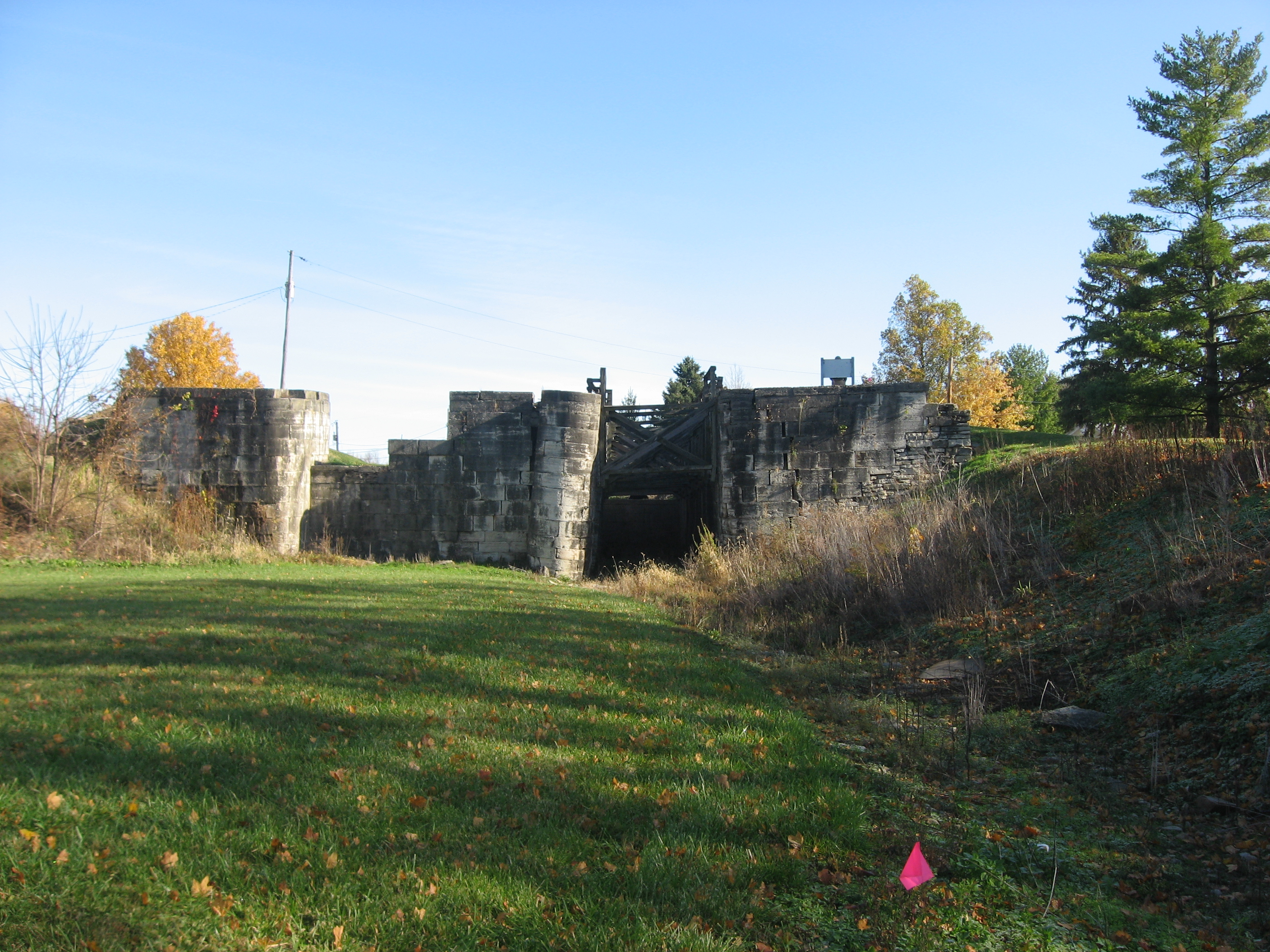
- One of the Lockington Locks

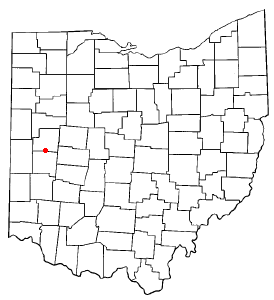
- Location of Lockington, Ohio

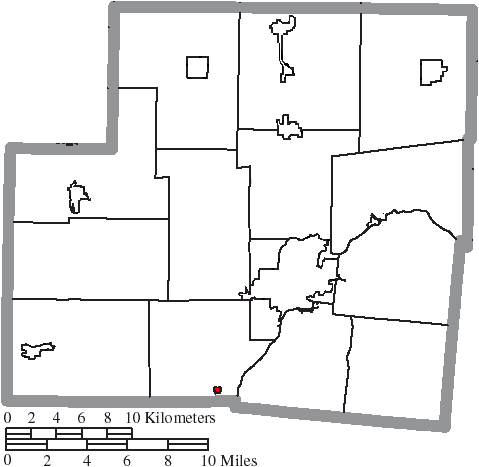
- Location of Lockington in Shelby County
- Coordinates: 40°12′27″N 84°14′9″W
- Country: United States
- State: Ohio
- County: Shelby
- Established: January 1, 2016

Government
  - Type: Mayor-Council
  - Mayor: Shannon Petitjean

Area
  - Total: 0.085 sq mi (0.22 km^{2})
  - Land: 0.085 sq mi (0.22 km^{2})
  - Water: 0 sq mi (0.00 km^{2})
- Elevation: 929 ft (283 m)

Population (2020)
  - Total: 162
  - Density: 1,917.6/sq mi (740.39/km^{2})
- Time zone: UTC-5 (Eastern (EST))
  - Summer (DST): UTC-4 (EDT)
- FIPS code: 39-44352
- GNIS feature ID: 2398463
- Website: https://villageoflockington.com/

Lockington (originally called Locksport) is a village in Washington Township, Shelby County, Ohio, United States, along Loramie Creek. The population was 162 at the 2020 census.

== History ==
Around 1830, a flour mill was built on Loramie Creek near where the village is now, and before that there was a sawmill built on the same creek that had been abandoned. In 1837, John Brown owned both of these mills, and built a new wool mill. A small community began to grow around these and other mills built along Loramie Creek later, and when the Miami and Erie Canal was built, a series of 5 canal locks lifted the water 60 feet (18 m) over the creek via an aqueduct. Due to its location near the locks, the community was originally called Locksport. As a crossroads between the main canal and feeders coming from Port Jefferson and Sidney, the community continued to grow.

In 1837, David Mellinger hired Jonathan Counts to survey and plat a new community on his land. The community of Lockington was approved for incorporation by the Shelby County Commissioners on September 9, 1857, and recorded by the Ohio Secretary of State on January 4, 1858. The first elections were help April 1, 1858, with W. S. Burns elected mayor. The Lockington Post Office was established on June 28, 1847. Around 1845, the first sawmill in Lockington was built by William Stephens, and a new mill built on the same site in 1860 with improvements to mill grain. The mill changed owners, but stayed in operation until it burned down around 1900. About 1905, D.K. Gillespie built a grain elevator in the village, which was vastly improved upon by its new owner, C.N. Adlard, in 1912, making it one of the largest in the state by storage capacity. As of 1913, there were also two general stores, a machine shop, a seasonal ice cream shop, and Knights of the Maccabees Tent No. 68. The post office remained in operation until August 30, 1914, mail service now handled through the Piqua branch. The original locks are now part of the Lockington Locks Historical Area.

In 2019, the Ohio Historical Records Advisory Board awarded Lockington a grant to assist in inventorying, organizing, and improving access to the village's historical documents.

== Geography ==
According to the United States Census Bureau, the village has a total area of 0.08 square miles (0.21 km^{2}), all land.

== Demographics ==
Historical population
| Census | Pop. | Note | %± |
|---|---|---|---|
| 1870 | 214 | | — |
| 1880 | 219 | | 2.3% |
| 1890 | 170 | | −22.4% |
| 1900 | 210 | | 23.5% |
| 1910 | 166 | | −21.0% |
| 1920 | 181 | | 9.0% |
| 1930 | 174 | | −3.9% |
| 1940 | 192 | | 10.3% |
| 1950 | 245 | | 27.6% |
| 1960 | 263 | | 7.3% |
| 1970 | 242 | | −8.0% |
| 1980 | 203 | | −16.1% |
| 1990 | 214 | | 5.4% |
| 2000 | 208 | | −2.8% |
| 2010 | 141 | | −32.2% |
| 2020 | 162 | | 14.9% |
U.S. Decennial Census

=== 2010 census ===
As of the census of 2010, there were 141 people, 56 households, and 42 families living in the village. The population density was 1,762.5 inhabitants per square mile (680.5/km^{2}). There were 64 housing units at an average density of 800.0 per square mile (308.9/km^{2}). The racial makeup of the village was 97.9% White, 0.7% Asian, and 1.4% from two or more races. Hispanic or Latino of any race were 0.7% of the population.

There were 56 households, of which 28.6% had children under the age of 18 living with them, 60.7% were married couples living together, 5.4% had a female householder with no husband present, 8.9% had a male householder with no wife present, and 25.0% were non-families. 21.4% of all households were made up of individuals, and 5.4% had someone living alone who was 65 years of age or older. The average household size was 2.52 and the average family size was 2.81.

The median age in the village was 44.8 years. 22% of residents were under the age of 18; 5.7% were between the ages of 18 and 24; 22.8% were from 25 to 44; 38.3% were from 45 to 64; and 11.3% were 65 years of age or older. The gender makeup of the village was 53.9% male and 46.1% female.

=== 2000 census ===
As of the census of 2000, there were 208 people, 74 households, and 60 families living in the village. The population density was 2,494.0 inhabitants per square mile (962.9/km^{2}). There were 77 housing units at an average density of 923.3 per square mile (356.5/km^{2}). The racial makeup of the village was 97.12% White, 2.40% African American and 0.48% Native American. Hispanic or Latino of any race were 1.44% of the population.

There were 74 households, out of which 39.2% had children under the age of 18 living with them, 64.9% were married couples living together, 12.2% had a female householder with no husband present, and 17.6% were non-families. 16.2% of all households were made up of individuals, and 5.4% had someone living alone who was 65 years of age or older. The average household size was 2.81 and the average family size was 3.11.

In the village, the population was spread out, with 26.9% under the age of 18, 12.0% from 18 to 24, 27.4% from 25 to 44, 24.0% from 45 to 64, and 9.6% who were 65 years of age or older. The median age was 36 years. For every 100 females there were 101.9 males. For every 100 females age 18 and over, there were 102.7 males.

The median income for a household in the village was $37,500, and the median income for a family was $39,500. Males had a median income of $25,694 versus $21,000 for females. The per capita income for the village was $15,374. About 9.4% of families and 7.5% of the population were below the poverty line, including 11.7% of those under the age of eighteen and none of those sixty-five or over.
