= Great Miami River =

River in Ohio and Indiana, United States

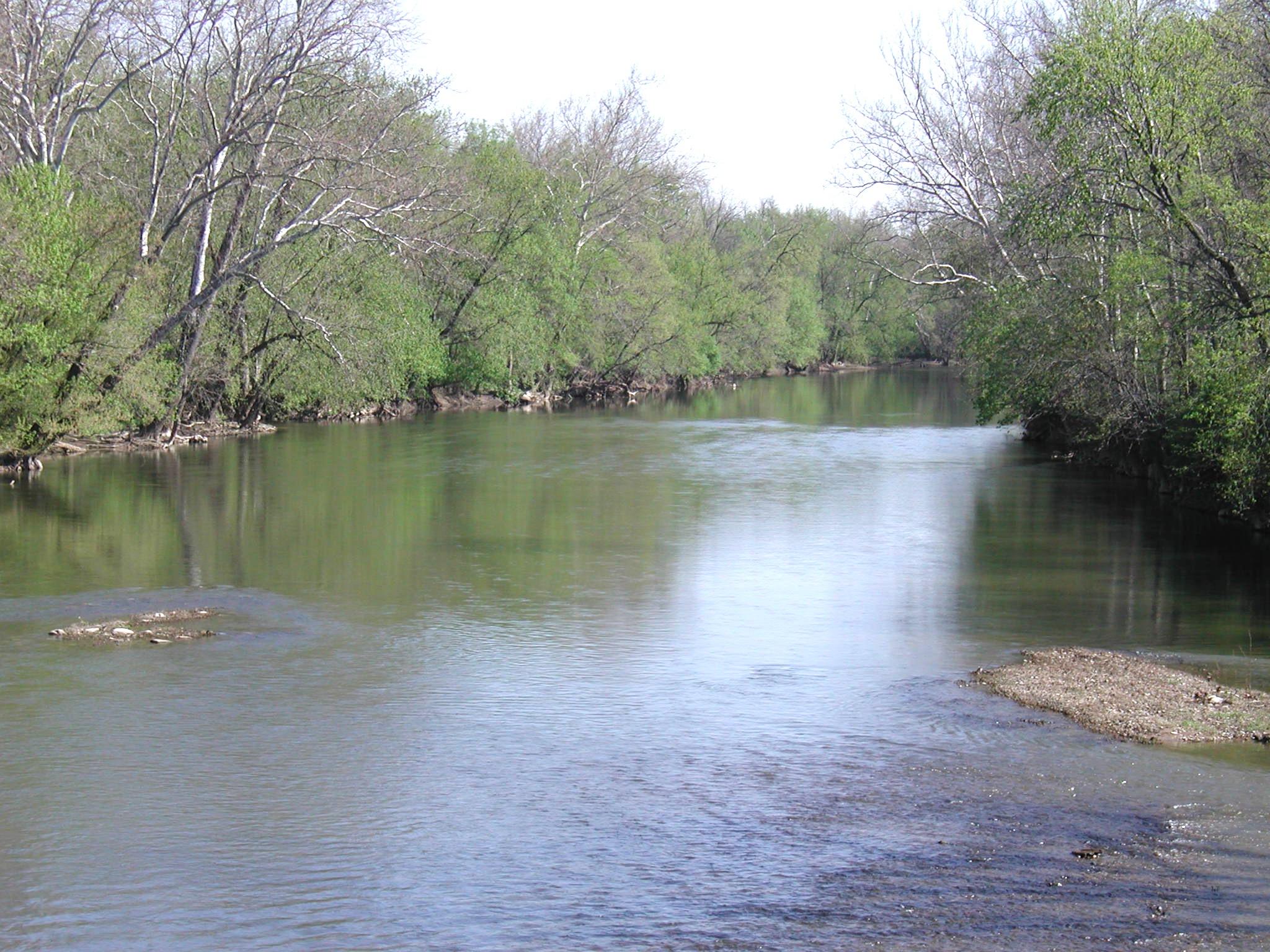
- The Great Miami River near Vandalia

Location
- Country: United States
- State: Ohio, Indiana
- Counties: Logan, Shelby, Miami, Montgomery, Warren, Butler, Hamilton in Ohio; Dearborn in Indiana

Physical characteristics
- Source
  - location: Indian Lake, Russells Point, Logan County, Ohio
  - coordinates: 40°28′04″N 83°52′33″W
  - elevation: 998 ft (304 m)
- Mouth
  - location: Ohio River, Miami Township, Hamilton County, Ohio
  - coordinates: 39°06′31″N 84°48′52″W
  - elevation: 449 feet (137 m)
- Length: 170 mi (270 km)
- Basin size: 5,373 mi^{2} (13,920 km^{2})
- Discharge
  - average: 5,368 cu ft/s (152.0 m^{3}/s)

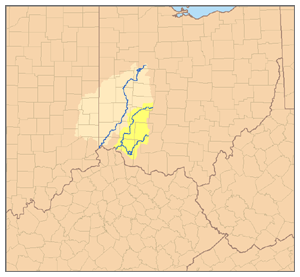
Map of the watersheds of the Great Miami River (beige) and Little Miami River (yellow)

The Great Miami River (also called the Miami River) (Shawnee: Msimiyamithiipi) is a tributary of the Ohio River, approximately 160 miles (260 km) long, in southwestern Ohio and Indiana in the United States. The Great Miami originates at the man-made Indian Lake and flows south through the cities of Sidney, Piqua, Troy, Dayton, Middletown and Hamilton.

The river is named for the Miami, an Algonquian-speaking Native American people who lived in the region during the early days of European settlement. They were forced to relocate to the west to escape pressure from European-American settlers.

The region surrounding the Great Miami River is known as the Miami Valley. This term is used in the upper portions of the valley as a moniker for the economic-cultural region centered primarily on the Greater Dayton area. As the lower portions of the Miami Valley fall under the influence of Cincinnati and the Ohio River Valley, residents of the lower area do not identify with the Miami in the same way.

== Course ==
The main course of the Great Miami River rises from the outflow of Indian Lake in Logan County, about 1 mile (1.6 km) southeast of the village of Russells Point, approximately 15 miles (24 km) southeast of Lima. Indian Lake is an artificial reservoir which receives the flow from the North and South forks of the Great Miami River. It flows south and southwest, past Sidney, and is joined by Loramie Creek in northern Miami County. It flows south past Piqua and Troy, and through Taylorsville Dam in Huber Heights and Vandalia. It continues through Dayton, where it is joined by the Stillwater and the Mad rivers and Wolf Creek.

From Dayton it flows southwest past Miamisburg, Franklin, Middletown and Hamilton in the southwest corner of Ohio. In southwestern Hamilton County, it is joined by the Whitewater River approximately 5 miles (8.0 km) upstream from its mouth on the Ohio River, just east of the Ohio-Indiana state line, approximately 16 miles (26 km) west of Cincinnati. The river meanders across the state line near Lawrenceburg, Indiana in the last two miles (3 km) before reaching its mouth approximately ¼ mile east of the border in Ohio.

The border of Ohio and Indiana was based on where the confluence of the Ohio and Great Miami Rivers was in 1800.

== Natural and human history ==
In the 1700s, the French called the river Riviere à la Roche ("River of the Rocks"). This name was directly taken from the Myaamia language (Miami-Illinois) of the Miami Nation that lived in the area (ahseni siipiiwi, meaning Rock River).

The Miami and Erie Canal, which connected the Ohio River with Lake Erie, was built through the Great Miami watershed. The first portion of the canal, from Cincinnati to Middletown, was operational in 1828, and extended to Dayton in 1830. Water from the Great Miami fed into the canal. A later extension to the canal, the Sidney Feeder, drew water from the upper reaches of the Great Miami from near Port Jefferson and Sidney. The canal served as the principal north–south route of transportation from Toledo to Cincinnati for western Ohio until being supplanted in the 1850s by railroads.

As was common in early industrial days, beginning in the 19th century the river served as a source of water and a method to dispose of wastes for a variety of major industrial firms, including Armco Steel, Champion International Paper, Black Clawson, Fernald and many others. Heightened attention to water pollution in the late 1950s and 1960s has led to significant improvements in waste disposal and water quality.

Following a catastrophic flood in March 1913, the Miami Conservancy District was established in 1914 to build dams, levees and storage areas as well as dredge and straighten channels to control flooding of the river.

== Alternate names ==
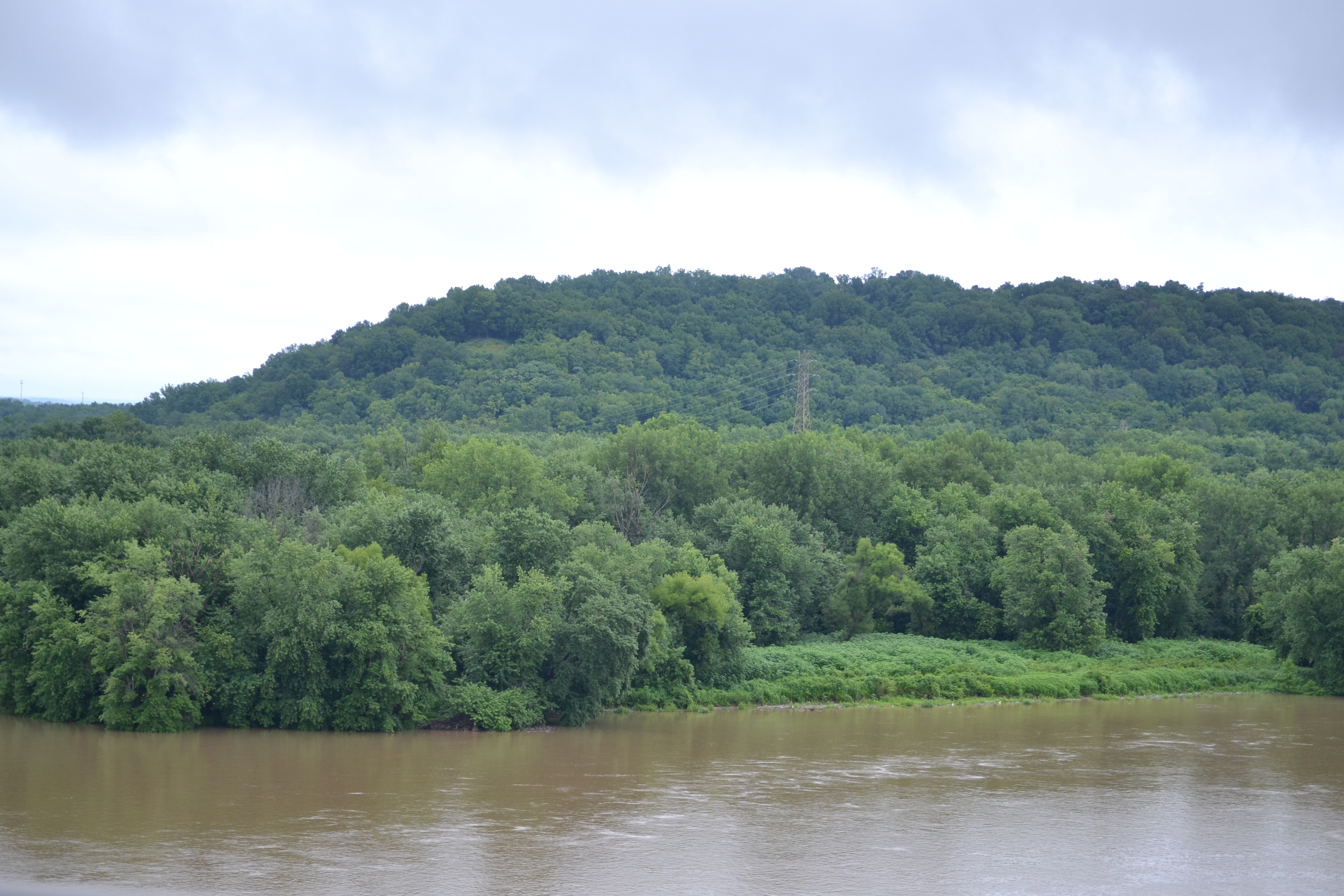
Flannery Island, located in the mouth of the Miami at its confluence with the Ohio River

The Great Miami River has also been known as:

- Assereniet River
- Big Miami River
- Gran Miammee Fiume
- Grande Miami Riviere
- Great Miama River
- Great Miamia River
- Great Miammee River
- Great Mineami River
- Miami River
- Riviere à la Roche
- Rocky Fiume
- Rocky River
- Big Mineamy River
- Great Miamis River
- Great Miyamis River
- Miamis River
- Riviere La Rushes
- Rockey River

== Tributaries ==
- Clear Creek (Great Miami River)
- Loramie Creek
- Mad River (Ohio)
- Stillwater River (Ohio)
- Twin Creek
- Whitewater River
- Wolf Creek
- Indian Creek (Ohio)
- Taylor Creek (Ohio)
- Sevenmile Creek (Ohio)
- Holes Creek

== See also ==
- List of rivers of Indiana
- List of rivers of Ohio
- Little Miami River
