= Auglaize =

Auglaize may refer to:

- Auglaize Township, Camden County, Missouri
- Auglaize Township, Laclede County, Missouri
- Auglaize River, tributary of the Maumee River in northwestern Ohio
- Auglaize County, Ohio
- Auglaize Township, Allen County, Ohio
- Auglaize Township, Paulding County, Ohio
