= Auglaize Township =

Auglaize Township may refer to:

== Missouri ==
- Auglaize Township, Camden County, Missouri
- Auglaize Township, Laclede County, Missouri

== Ohio ==
- Auglaize Township, Allen County, Ohio
- Auglaize Township, Paulding County, Ohio
