= Ottawa River (disambiguation) =

The Ottawa River is a major waterway in Ontario and Quebec, Canada.

Ottawa River may also refer to:

- Ottawa River (Auglaize River tributary), in Ohio, United States
- Ottawa River (Lake Erie), in Michigan and Ohio in the United States, which drains into Lake Erie
- Ottaway River, an archaic name of the Boardman River in the northwest of Michigan's Lower Peninsula
