= Salt Run =

Salt Run may refer to:

- Salt Run (Noble County, Ohio)
- Salt Run (Warren County, Ohio)
