= Reas =

Reas may refer to:

== People ==
- Casey Reas (born 1972), American artist
- Paul Reas (born 1955), British photographer and lecturer

== Places ==
- Reas Pass, Idaho
- Reas Run, Idaho

== See also ==
- Rees (disambiguation)
