= Blackhoof Creek =

Stream in Ohio, United States

Coordinates: 40°37′04″N 84°06′55″W

Blackhoof Creek is a stream located entirely within Auglaize County, Ohio. The 6-mile (9.7 km) long stream is a tributary of the Auglaize River.

Blackhoof Creek was named after Black Hoof, a Shawnee Indian chief.

== See also ==
- List of rivers of Ohio
