= Swine Creek =

Stream in Ohio, U.S.

Coordinates: 41.47695°N 80.92191°W

Swine Creek is a stream in the U.S. state of Ohio. It is a 14.1-mile (22.7 km) long tributary to the Grand River.

According to tradition, Swine Creek received its name from a pioneer incident when a settler's pigs escaped and were later found at the creek.
