= Beaver Creek (Raccoon Creek tributary) =

Stream in Ohio, U.S.

Coordinates: 38°50′07″N 82°22′16″W

Beaver Creek is a stream in the U.S. state of Ohio. It is a tributary of Raccoon Creek.

Beaver Creek was named for the beaver dams along its course.

== See also ==
- List of rivers of Ohio
