= Trout fishing in Ohio =

Ohio currently has 5 rivers that host populations of either rainbow trout, brown trout, or brook trout. These rivers are the Mad River, the Clear Fork River, Clear Creek, the Chagrin River, and the Rocky River.

== The Mad River ==
Ohio's oldest trout stream is the Mad River. Stocking of this river began in the late 19th century with the introduction of Brook trout. In 1884 Rainbow trout were introduced to the stream. In 1931 the Ohio Department of Natural Resources (ODNR) Division of Wildlife took control of the Rainbow trout project. The department continued to support the project until 1984 when the state introduced brown trout in their stead. Today the stream is stocked annually with 12,000 brown trout measuring 6"-8" to supplement the population.

Public access points can be found at various locations along the river which begins in Logan County near the city of Bellefontaine and runs southwest to Dayton where it flows into the Great Miami River. These access points are generally small and tend to be next to bridges where local roads cross the river, though several parks provide access as well.

As there are hatches of mayflies, caddis flies, and other popular trout foods throughout the spring, summer, and fall months, fly fishing on the river is viable. Other popular methods of fishing include the use of in-line spinners or the use of live bait rigs.

The minimum size required to keep trout caught on the Mad River is 12 inches, and the daily catch limit is two fish.

== Clear Fork Mohican River ==
The Clear Fork Mohican River is located near the town of Loudonville, OH, about one hour north of the city of Columbus, OH. It is divided into two parts, the Upper and the Lower branches. The Upper branch has limited accessibility and runs from the Clear Fork Reservoir East to Pleasant Hill Lake. The Lower Branch runs East from the Pleasant Hill Dam through Mohican State Park where it ends at the Mohican River.

It was first stocked in the early 1980s by local fishing clubs, and in 1992 the ODNR began to stock it annually with 6"-8" brown trout. It is one of three Ohio streams with the species. This was also done with two of its tributaries, Cedar Fork on the Upper branch and Pine Run on the Lower branch. Two of its tributaries, Cedar Fork on the Upper branch and Pine Run on the Lower branch, are also stocked.

Along with brown trout, there are populations of other species including smallmouth bass, rainbow trout, and rock bass. The ODNR Division of Wildlife put special regulations in place for the fishery, including a daily bag limit of two fish and a minimum length limit of 12" for trout. Catch and release is recommended by Trout Unlimited to conserve the population and allow for larger future catches.

== Clear Creek ==
Located just southeast of Lancaster in Clear Creek Metro Park lies Clear Creek, one of the newest streams in Ohio to receive the title of trout stream. Overseen by the ODNR, the river is stocked annually with 6"-8" Brown trout. It is the only trout stream in the Southeastern portion of Ohio.

The fishable area runs throughout the entirety of Clear Creek Metro Park and access points can be found along the road that runs through the park.

This trout stream has a minimum keep size of 12" for trout and a daily catch limit of two trout.

== The Chagrin River and the Rocky River ==
A tributary in Geauga County of the Chagrin River, and the Rocky River and its tributaries, located in Medina County, are the host to populations of wild Brook trout in Ohio. The Chagrin tributary is the only remaining naturally occurring population of native Brook Trout in Ohio. Both of these rivers are located in Northeast Ohio. State regulations prohibit possession of trout from these waters. For this reason it is advisable to use barbless hooks when fishing for trout in either of these two rivers but it is legal to harvest steelhead trout from these two rivers.

== See also ==
- Fishing in Alabama
- Fishing in Wyoming
