= Sugar Creek (Ottawa River tributary) =

Creek in the U.S. state of Ohio

Coordinates: 40°57′33″N 84°10′56″W

Sugar Creek is a stream in the U.S. state of Ohio. It is a tributary of the Ottawa River (Auglaize River).

Sugar Creek was named for the sugar maple trees which once grew in abundance along its course.

== See also ==
- List of rivers of Ohio
