= List of rivers of Ohio =

Ohio is a Midwestern state in the Great Lakes region of the United States. The state takes its name from the Ohio River, whose name in turn originated from the Seneca word ohiːyo', meaning "good river", "great river" or "large creek". The Ohio River forms its southern border, though nearly all of the river itself belongs to Kentucky and West Virginia.

Significant rivers within the state include the Cuyahoga River, Great Miami River, Maumee River, Muskingum River, and Scioto River. The rivers in the northern part of the state drain into the northern Atlantic Ocean via Lake Erie and the St. Lawrence River, and the rivers in the southern part of the state drain into the Gulf of Mexico via the Ohio River and then the Mississippi.

The worst weather disaster in Ohio history occurred along the Great Miami River in 1913. Known as the Great Dayton Flood, the entire Miami River watershed flooded, including the downtown business district of Dayton. As a result, the Miami Conservancy District was created as the first major flood plain engineering project in Ohio and the United States.

== Alphabetically ==
- Alum Creek
- Apple Creek
- Ashtabula River
- Auglaize River
- Beaver Creek (Lorain County, Ohio)
- Beaver Creek (Raccoon Creek tributary)
- Big Creek
- Big Darby Creek
- Big Walnut Creek
- Black Fork Mohican River
- Black River
- Blackhoof Creek
- Blacklick Creek
- Blanchard River
- Brandywine Creek (Broken Sword Creek tributary)
- Brandywine Creek (Cuyahoga River tributary)
- Brandywine Creek (Miami River tributary)
- Brandywine Creek (Tuscarawas River tributary)
- Brewster Creek
- Broken Sword Creek
- Buck Creek (feeds Clarence J. Brown Reservoir)
- Butler Run
- Captina Creek
- Chagrin River
- Chippewa Creek (Cuyahoga River tributary)
- Chippewa Creek (Tuscarawas River tributary)
- Clear Creek
- Clear Fork Mohican River
- Conneaut Creek
- Conotton Creek
- Cuyahoga River
- Duck Creek
- Duncan Run
- Euclid Creek
- Federal Creek
- Flatrock Creek
- Grand River
- Great Miami River (Miami River tributary)
- Green Creek
- Greenville Creek
- Harkers Run
- Hemlock Creek
- Hocking River
- Hopsons Creek
- Huff Run
- Huron River
- Killbuck Creek
- Kingsbury Run
- Kinnikinnick Creek
- Kokosing River
- Lake Fork Mohican River
- Leading Creek
- Leatherwood Creek (Tawana Creek tributary)
- Leatherwood Creek (Wills Creek tributary)
- Licking River
- Little Auglaize River
- Little Beaver Creek
- Little Beaver Creek (Lorain County, Ohio)
- Little Cuyahoga River
- Little Darby Creek
- Little Hocking River
- Little Miami River
- Little Muskingum River
- Little Ottawa River
- Little Sandusky River
- Little Scioto River (Ohio River tributary)
- Little Scioto River (Scioto River tributary)
- Little Wakatomika Creek
- Loramie Creek
- Mad River
- Mahoning River
- Margaret Creek
- Maumee River
- Mill Creek
- Mississinewa River
- Mohican River
- Monday Creek
- Moxahala Creek
- Muskingum River
- Nimishillen Creek
- Ohio Brush Creek
- Ohio River
- Olentangy River
- Ottawa River (Auglaize River tributary)
- Ottawa River (Lake Erie) (Toledo)
- Pigeye Creek
- Paint Creek
- Pee Pee Creek
- Portage River
- Raccoon Creek
- Rattlesnake Creek
- Rocky River
- St. Joseph River
- St. Marys River
- Sandusky River
- Sandy Creek
- Schocalog Run
- Scioto River
- Shade River
- Shenango River
- Slabcamp Run
- Slate Run
- Solomon Run
- Still Fork
- Stillwater River
- Styx River
- Sugar Creek (Ottawa River tributary)
- Sugar Creek (Tuscarawas River tributary)
- Sunday Creek
- Symmes Creek
- Sycamore Creek
- Tiffin River
- Tinkers Creek
- Toussaint River (Ohio)
- Turtle Creek
- Tuscarawas River
- Vermilion River
- Wabash River
- Wakatomika Creek
- Walhonding River
- Wheeling Creek
- Whitewater River
- Wills Creek
- Wolf Creek (Great Miami River tributary)
- Wolf Creek (Muskingum River tributary)

== By tributary ==
=== Lake Erie ===
- Bear Creek
  - Little Bear Creek
- Halfway Creek
  - Shantee Creek
  - Silver Creek

==== Ottawa River ====
- Ottawa River
  - Sibley Creek
  - Tenmile Creek
    - North Branch Tenmile Creek
    - Prairie Ditch

==== Maumee River ====
- Maumee River
  - Duck Creek
  - Swan Creek
    - Wolf Creek
      - Cairl Creek
    - Blue Creek
      - Mosquito Creek
      - Harris Ditch
    - Gail Run
    - Ai Creek
  - Delaware Creek
  - Grassy Creek
  - Tontogany Creek
  - Kettle Run
  - Beaver Creek
    - Little Beaver Creek
    - Cutoff Ditch
      - Brush Creek
      - Yellow Creek
        - West Creek
        - Little Yellow Creek
    - East Beaver Creek
    - West Beaver Creek
  - Big Creek
  - Lick Creek
  - Bad Creek
    - South Branch Bad Creek
  - Dry Creek
  - School Creek
    - Turkeyfoot Creek
      - Lost Creek
        - Brush Creek
      - West Creek
        - Mess Ditch
        - Gustwiller Ditch
    - Brickman Ditch
  - North Turkeyfoot Creek
    - Konzen Ditch
  - Obernouse Creek
    - Van Hyning Creek
  - Garrett Creek
  - Benien Creek
    - Brubaker Creek
    - Barnes Creek
  - Wade Creek
    - Huston Creek
  - Preston Run
  - Auglaize River
    - Powell Creek
      - Wagner Run
      - North Powell Creek
        - Hogback Run
      - South Powell Creek
    - Threemile Creek
    - Jackson Ditch
    - Beetree Creek
    - Fivemile Creek
    - Eagle Creek
    - Sixmile Creek
      - Bull Creek
    - Little Flatrock Creek
    - Flatrock Creek
      - Wildcat Creek
    - Blue Creek
      - Barcer Run
      - Webster Ditch
      - Cunningham Creek
        - Buchanan Ditch
      - Upper Prairie Creek
      - Parker Ditch
      - Sponseller Ditch
    - Little Auglaize River
      - Prairie Creek
        - West Branch Prairie Creek
          - Hog Run
          - Hoaglin Creek
            - Monkey Run
        - Dog Run
        - Hagerman Creek
        - Dry Creek
      - Middle Branch Little Auglaize River
        - Maddox Creek
          - Balyeat Ditch
          - Sheets Ditch
        - Town Creek
          - Roller Creek
      - Dog Creek
        - Emmit Bell Ditch
        - Spice Run
      - Bandehoff Ditch
        - Dry Run
          - Hermann Ditch
      - Benson Ditch
      - Wolf Ditch
      - Long Prairie Creek
      - Kyle Prairie Ditch
        - Greens Ditch
      - Frisinger Ditch
    - Prairie Creek
    - Blanchard River
    - Ottawa River
      - Little Ottawa River
  - Hog Creek
  - Tiffin River
    - Lick Creek
  - St. Joseph River
  - St. Marys River
    - Black Creek
    - Clear Creek
- Otter Creek
- Wolf Creek
- Cedar Creek
  - Dry Creek
  - Little Cedar Creek
- Crane Creek
  - Ayers Creek
  - Little Crane Creek
  - Henry Creek
  - Two Root Creek
- Turtle Creek
  - North Branch Turtle Creek
  - South Branch Turtle Creek

==== Toussaint River (Ohio) ====
- Toussaint River (Ohio)
  - Rusha Creek
  - Toussaint Creek
  - Packer Creek

==== Portage River (Ohio) ====
- Portage River
  - Little Portage River
    - Cottonwood Swale
    - Ninemile Creek
    - Indian Creek
  - Green Bayou
  - Bayou Creek
    - Lacarpe Creek
  - Wolf Creek
  - Sugar Creek
  - Victoria Creek
  - Middle Branch Portage River
    - North Branch Portage River
      - Yankey Creek
      - Cuckle Creek
    - South Branch Portage River
      - East Branch Portage River
        - South Branch East Branch Portage River
    - Bull Creek
    - Rocky Ford
    - Needles Creek
    - Rader Creek

==== Sandusky River ====
- Sandusky River
  - Green Creek
    - Yellow Slough
    - Flag Run
    - Beaver Creek
      - Owl Creek
      - Westerhouse Ditch
        - Albreight Ditch
        - Noel Ditch
      - Emerson Creek
        - Royer Ditch
  - Bark Creek
  - Muskellunge Creek
  - Indian Creek
  - Wolf Creek
    - East Branch Wolf Creek
      - Snuff Creek
      - East Fork East Branch Wolf Creek
        - Middle Fork East Branch Wolf Creek
  - Sugar Creek
  - Spicer Creek
  - Morrison Creek
  - Willow Creek
  - Rock Creek
    - East Branch Rock Creek
    - Armstrong and Beighly Ditch
      - Carpenter Ditch
  - Gibson Creek
  - Bells Run
  - Honey Creek
    - Buckeye Creek
    - Silver Creek
    - Eicholtz Ditch
      - Kagy Ditch
      - Bollinger Ditch
    - Hedden Ditch
    - Hooper Ditch
    - Schaaf Ditch
    - Brokenknife Creek
  - Mile Run
  - Sycamore Creek
    - Greasy Run
  - Taylor Run
  - Thorn Run
  - Tymochtee Creek
    - Spring Run
      - Poverty Run
      - No. 32 Ditch
    - Little Tymochtee Creek
      - Hart Ditch
      - Browns Run
      - Veith Ditch
  - Lick Run
  - Baughman Run
  - Blake Ditch
  - Perkins Run
  - Oak Run
  - Sugar Run
  - Warpole Creek
    - Saint James Run
    - Little Tymochtee Creek
      - Revhorn Run
        - Pawpaw Run
    - PawPaw Run
    - Carroll Ditch
    - Enoch Creek
    - Prairie Run
      - Thompson Ditch
  - Layton Ditch
  - Sugar Run
  - Negro Run
    - Spring Branch
    - Kiser Run
  - Porcupine Creek
    - Cranberry Run
  - Rock Run
  - Little Sandusky River
    - Honey Run
  - Broken Sword Creek
    - Indian Run
    - Brandywine Creek (Broken Sword Creek tributary)
    - Red Run
  - Grass Run
    - Gray Eye Run
  - Loss Creek
  - Paramour Creek
  - Allen Run
- South Creek
- Racoon Creek
- Pickerel Creek
  - Strong Creek
  - Fuller Creek
- Little Pickerel Creek
- Cold Creek
- Mills Creek
- Pipe Creek
- Plum Brook
- Sawmill Creek

==== Huron River ====
- Huron River
  - Mud Brook
  - East Branch Huron River
    - Cole Creek
    - Norwalk Creek
  - West Branch Huron River
    - Seymour Creek
      - Megginson Creek
    - Frink Run
      - Haas Ditch
      - Schoeffel Ditch
    - Slate Run
      - Mud Run
      - Mud Run
        - Shriner Ditch
      - Marsh Run
- Old Woman Creek
- Cranberry Creek
- Chappel Creek
- Sugar Creek
- Darby Creek
- Sherod Creek

==== Vermilion River ====
- Vermilion River
  - East Fork Vermilion River
  - East Branch Vermilion River
  - Indian Creek
  - Southwest Branch Vermilion River
  - Buck Creek
  - Clear Creek
- Brownhelm Creek
- Quarry Creek
- Beaver Creek
- Martin Run

==== Black River ====
- Black River
  - Ziegman Ditch
  - French Creek
    - Jungbluth Ditch
    - Walker Ditch
    - Kline Ditch
    - Avins Ditch
      - Klingsburn Ditch
    - Slater Ditch
  - Ridgeway Ditch
  - East Branch Black River
    - Willow Creek
      - Fortune Ditch
    - Salt Creek
    - Crow Creek
    - Coon Creek
    - East Fork East Branch Black River
    - West Fork East Branch Black River
      - Clear Creek
  - West Branch Black River
    - Straw Ditch
      - Schroeder Ditch
    - Dant Ditch
    - Elk Creek
      - Kelner Ditch
    - Squires Ditch
    - Plum Creek
    - Wellington Creek
      - Ponderosa Pines Lake
      - Findley Lake
    - Charlemont Creek
    - Buck Creek
- Schumaker Ditch
- Powdermaker Ditch
- Heider Ditch
- Gable Ditch
- Porter Creek
- Cahoon Creek
- Sperry Creek
- Tuttle Creek
- Willow Creek

==== Rocky River ====
- Rocky River
  - West Channel Rocky River
  - Abram Creek (Rocky River, Lake Erie)
  - East Branch Rocky River
    - Baldwin Creek
      - Healey Creek
    - Big Brook
    - Willow Brook
  - West Branch Rocky River
    - Plum Creek (Rocky River, Lake Erie)
    - Baker Creek (Rocky River, Lake Erie)
    - Blodgett Creek
    - Cossett Creek
    - Mallet Creek
    - North Branch West Branch Rocky River
      - Plum Creek (Rocky River, Lake Erie)
      - Remson Creek
        - Granger Ditch
      - South Branch Rocky River

==== Cuyahoga River ====
- Cuyahoga River
  - Old River
  - Kingsbury Run
  - Morgan Run
  - Burk Branch
  - Big Creek
    - Countrymans Creek
  - West Creek
  - Mill Creek

===== Tinkers Creek =====
  - Tinkers Creek
    - Beaver Meadow Run
    - Hawthorne Creek
    - Hemlock Creek
    - Neptune Lake
    - Pond Brook
    - Wood Creek
  - Chippewa Creek

===== Brandywine Creek =====
  - Brandywine Creek (Cuyahoga River tributary)
    - Indian Creek
  - Stanford Run
  - Grannys Run
  - Slipper Run
  - Boston Run
  - Haskell Run
    - Ritchie Run
  - Salt Run
  - Dickerson Run
  - Langes Run
  - Robinson Run
  - Furnace Run
    - Riding Run
  - Yellow Creek
    - North Fork Yellow Creek
  - Woodward Creek
  - Sand Run
  - Mud Brook
    - Woodward Creek
    - Old Mill Pond
    - Powers Brook
  - Little Cuyahoga River
    - Springfield Lake Outlet
    - Wingfoot Lake Outlet
  - Fish Creek
  - Plum Creek
  - Breakneck Creek (Cuyahoga River tributary)
    - Potter Creek
  - Black Brook
  - Sawyer Brook
  - Bridge Creek
  - West Branch Cuyahoga River
    - Butternut Creek
    - Hopsons Creek
  - Tare Creek

==== Doan Brook ====
- Doan Brook
  - Wade Lagoon
  - Fairmont Reservoir
  - Baldwin Reservoir
  - Lower Shaker Lake
  - Upper Shaker Lake
  - Blue Rock Brook
- Walnut Creek
- Ninemile Creek

==== Euclid Creek ====
- Euclid Creek
  - East Branch
    - Claribel Creek
    - Stevenson Brook
    - Verbsky Creek
      - Redstone Run

==== Chagrin River ====
- Chagrin River
  - East Branch Chagrin River
  - Griswold Creek
  - Willey Creek
  - Aurora Branch
    - McFarland Creek
  - Silver Creek
  - Beaver Creek

==== Marsh Creek ====
- Marsh Creek
  - Heisley Creek

==== Grand River ====
- Grand River
  - Black Brook
  - Caroline Creek
  - Pebble Branch
  - Red Creek
  - Big Creek
    - Kellogg Creek
      - Ellison Creek
    - Gordon Creek
    - East Creek
    - Aylworth Creek
    - Jenks Creek
    - Cutts Creek
  - Paine Creek
    - Bates Creek
    - Phelps Creek
  - Talcott Creek
  - Griswold Creek
  - Mill Creek
  - Coffee Creek
  - Center Creek
  - Mill Creek
    - Griggs Creek
    - Askme Run
    - Peters Creek
  - Bronson Creek
  - Trumbull Creek
    - Spring Creek
  - Three Brothers Creek
    - Badger Run
  - Rock Creek
    - Plum Creek
    - Sugar Creek
    - Whetstone Creek
    - Lebanon Creek
    - Shanty Creek
  - Crooked Creek
    - Mud Creek
  - Hoskins Creek
    - Indian Creek
    - Montville Ditch
  - Phelps Creek
  - Petersen Creek
    - North Branch Phelps Creek
    - South Branch Phelps Creek
  - Mill Creek
    - Garden Creek
  - Swine Creek
    - Grapevine Creek
    - Andrews Creek
    - Plum Creek
  - Coffee Creek
    - Baughman Creek
  - Center Creek
  - Mud Run
  - Dead Branch
- McKinley Creek
- Big Creek
- Wheeler Creek
- Cowles Creek
- Indian Creek
- Red Brook

==== Ashtabula River ====
- Ashtabula River
  - Fields Brook
  - Strong Brook
  - Hubbard Run
  - Ashtabula Creek
  - West Branch Ashtabula River
    - East Branch Ashtabula River

==== Conneaut Creek ====
- Conneaut Creek
  - West Branch Conneaut Creek
    - East Branch Conneaut Creek
    - Middle Branch Conneaut Creek
  - Stone Run
  - Fish Creek
- Turkey Creek

=== Ohio River ===
==== Wabash River ====
- Wabash River
  - Mississinewa River
    - Jordan Ditch
        - Grays Branch
  - Hickory Branch
    - Scherman Ditch
  - Beaver Creek
    - Big Run
    - Brush Run
    - Little Beaver Creek
      - Little Bear Creek
    - Buck Run
    - Herden Creek
    - Coldwater Creek
      - Burntwood Creek
    - Beaver Creek
      - Darlinghaus Ditch
  - Crab Branch
  - Toti Creek
  - Stony Creek
  - Twomile Creek
  - Threemile Creek
  - Vandenbush Ditch
  - Ward Ditch
  - Bear Creek

==== Great Miami River ====
- Great Miami River
  - Doublelick Run
  - Whitewater River
    - Sand Run
    - Dry Fork
      - Lee Creek
      - Howard Creek
      - Sater Run
      - Phillips Creek
    - Jamison Creek
    - East Fork Whitewater River
      - Elkhorn Creek
        - Mud Creek
          - Horn Ditch
      - Rocky Fork
      - Little Creek
        - Brinley Fork
        - Jocqueway Fork
      - Dry Run
  - Jordan Creek
  - Taylor Creek
  - Paddys Run
  - Bluerock Creek
  - Owl Creek
  - Dunlap Creek
  - Dry Run
  - Indian Creek
    - Salmon Run
  - Banklick Creek
  - Pleasant Run
  - Crawford Run
  - Twomile Creek
  - Fourmile Creek
    - Sevenmile Creek
      - Ninemile Creek
      - Big Cave Run
      - Rush Run
      - Paint Creek
        - Opossum Run
        - Sugar Run
      - Beasley Run
      - Pottenger Run
      - Rocky Run
      - Crumbaker Run
    - Bull Run
    - Harkers Run
    - Spring Run
    - Little Fourmile Creek
    - East Fork Talawanda Creek
    - Harris Run
  - Gregory Creek
    - Coldwater Creek
  - Dicks Creek
    - North Branch Dicks Creek
    - Shaker Creek
      - Millers Creek
  - Elk Creek
  - Browns Run
  - Twin Creek
    - Little Twin Creek
    - Toms Run
      - Wysong Run
    - Aukerman Run
    - Bantas Run
      - Goose Creek
        - Lowry Run
    - Lesley Run
    - Coffman Run
    - Price Creek
      - Jims Run
    - Swamp Creek
    - Millers Fork
    - Lick Run
    - Dry Fork
  - Clear Creek
    - Gander Run
      - Goose Creek
  - Dry Run
  - Crains Run
  - Sycamore Creek
  - Bear Creak
    - Little Bear Creek
      - Garber Run
      - Diehl Run
      - Lick Run
    - Spring Run
  - Opossum Creek
  - Holes Creek
  - Honey Creek
  - Wolf Creek
    - Dry Run
    - North Branch Wolf Creek
      - Razor Run
    - Poplar Run
  - Mad River
    - Buck Creek
  - Stillwater River
    - Greenville Creek
  - Loramie Creek
  - Tawana Creek
  - Muchinippi Creek
    - Calico Creek
    - Wolf Creek
      - Little Muchinippi Creek
        - Baughman Ditch
        - Jackson Center Ditch
    - Willow Creek
  - Cherokee Run
  - South Fork Great Miami River
    - Slow Ditch
  - North Fork Great Miami River
  - Blackhawk Run
  - Van Horn Creek
- Muddy Creek
- Rapid Run

==== Mill Creek ====
- Mill Creek
  - West Fork Mill Creek
  - Ross Run
  - Fox Run
  - Sharon Creek
  - East Fork Mill Creek

==== Little Miami River ====
- Little Miami River
  - East Fork Little Miami River
    - Solomon Run
  - Turtle Creek
  - Halls Creek
  - Todd Fork
    - First Creek
  - Caesar Creek
  - Massies Creek

==== Fivemile Creek ====
- Fivemile Creek
- Eightmile Creek
- Tenmile Creek
  - Ninemile Creek
- Pond Run
- Twelvemile Creek
  - Fagin Run
  - Ferguson Run
  - Briggs Run
- Little Indian Creek
- Boat Run
- Indian Creek
  - Dry Run
  - Colclaser Run
    - Sugar Creek
  - North Fork Indian Creek
  - South Fork Indian Creek
  - Bee Run
- Little Indian Creek
- Ray Run
- Maple Creek
  - Vinegar Run
- Bear Creek
- Crooked Run
  - Patterson Run
- Ryan Run
- Bullskin Creek
  - Big Run
  - Slickaway Run
  - East Branch Bullskin Creek
  - Middle Branch Bullskin Creek
  - West Branch Bullskin Creek
    - Painter Fork
- Moon Hollow Run
- Miranda Run
- Hog Run

==== Whiteoak Creek ====
- Whiteoak Creek
  - Big Run
    - Lyon Run
  - Boat Run
  - Cochran Run
  - Ross Run
  - Opossum Run
  - Town Run
  - Walnut Creek
  - Indian Run
  - Unity Creek
  - Miranda Run
  - Shot Pouch Run
  - Sterling Run
    - Snapping Turtle Run
    - Plum Creek
  - Goose Run
  - East Fork Whiteoak Creek
    - Turkeyhole Run
    - Browns Run
    - Middle Run
    - Slabcamp Run
      - Twin Run
    - Bells Run
    - Plum Run
    - Sugar Run
  - North Fork Whiteoak Creek
    - Flat Run
      - Brush Run
    - Yellow Run
    - Ruble Run
    - Indian Run
    - Little North Fork Whiteoak Creek
    - Lick Run
    - Stony Branch
    - Barr Run
- Straight Creek
  - Sink Creek
  - Rangle Run
  - Sheep Run
  - Campbell Run
  - Evans Run
  - Brady Run
  - Washburn Run
    - Bull Run
  - Scott Run
  - Camp Run
  - Myers Run
  - Rocky Run
  - Honey Run
  - West Fork Straight Creek
  - Buck Run
  - Sycamore Run
- Levanna Branch
- Cornick Run
  - Myers Run
- Redoak Creek
  - West Fork Redoak Creek
    - Sutherland Run

==== Eagle Creek ====
- Eagle Creek
  - Baylor Run
  - Beetle Creek
  - Lafferty Run
  - Indian Lick
  - Brushy Fork
  - Suck Run
    - Wild Duck Branch
  - East Fork Eagle Creek
    - Town Branch
    - Washburn Run
    - Ada Run
    - Hills Fork
      - Lick Run
      - Gordon Run
    - Hannah Run
  - West Fork Eagle Creek
    - Rattlesnake Creek
    - Northwest Fork Eagle Creek
- Threemile Creek
  - Slickaway Run
  - Big Run
  - Dry Run
  - Morley Run
- Fishing Gut Creek
- Little Threemile Creek
  - Lickskillet Branch
- Buzzardroost Creek
- Elk Run
- McClelland Run
  - Bradford Run
- Isaacs Creek
- Island Creek
- Lindsey Creek
  - Ellison Run
- Donaldson Run
- Cummings Creek
  - Lower Sister Creek
- Upper Sister Creek
- Spring Run

==== Ohio Brush Creek ====
- Ohio Brush Creek
  - Asher Run
  - Waggoner Run
  - Mackenzie Run
  - Black Run
  - Beasley Fork
    - Moore Run
  - Soldiers Run
  - Easter Run
  - Cedar Run
  - Semple Run
  - Lick Fork
    - Treber Run
    - Cave Run
  - Bundle Run
  - West Fork Ohio Brush Creek
    - Spoon River
    - Georges Creek
      - Big Run
    - Cherry Fork
      - Grace Run
        - Martins Run
    - Gregg Run
    - Buck Run
    - Little West Fork Ohio Brush Creek
    - Elk Fork
    - Turkey Run
  - Shimer Run
  - Little East Fork Ohio Brush Creek
  - Wolf Creek
  - Crooked Creek
  - Weasel Run
  - Baker Fork
    - Middle Fork
      - Cow Run
      - Setty Branch
      - Cox Branch
    - Straight Creek
    - Muddy Fork
  - Kerr Run
  - Flat Run
  - Elm Run
    - Elk Run
  - Bee Run
  - Rock Lick
  - Lost Fork
- Alex Run
- Smokey Creek
- Stout Run
  - Cattail Run
  - Russell Fork
  - Tracey Run
  - Puntenney Run
  - Southdown Fork
  - Pine Fork
  - Black Walnut Fork
- Long Lick Run
- Wikoff Run
- Sulphur Creek
- Little Sulphur Creek
- Gilpen Creek
- McCall Run
- Rock Run
- Lower Twin Creek
  - Sugarcamp Run
  - Vastine Run
- Upper Twin Creek
  - Boland Run
  - Dry Run
  - Tucker Run
  - East Fork Upper Twin Creek
    - Jake Run
    - Bald Knob Run
  - Brushy Fork
  - Horner Branch
- Moore Run
- Spencer Run
- McAtee Run
- Old Pond Run
  - Mundy Run
- Pond Run
  - East Fork Pond Run
  - Middle Fork Pond Run
  - Grass Lick Run
  - McBride Run
  - Gabe Run
  - Brushy Fork
- Nace Run
- Turkey Creek
  - Brouse Run
    - Vaughters Run
  - Stony Run
    - Lower Lick Stony Run
    - Upper Lick Stony Run
  - Worley Run
  - Rabbit Run
  - Odell Run
  - Pond Lick Run
    - Rock Lick
    - Brush Fork
  - Wes Run
  - Barbara Run
  - Buck Lick
  - Harber Fork
  - Mackletree Run
    - Plummer Fork
  - Lampblack Run
  - Old Lade Run
    - Scantling Run
  - Rock Lick
  - Wolfden Run
- Carey Run
  - Bellamy Run
- Slab Run
  - Lousy Run
    - Hyggen Run

==== Scioto River ====
- Scioto River
  - Scioto Brush Creek
  - Salt Creek
  - Paint Creek
    - Rattlesnake Creek
  - Deer Creek
    - Oak Run
  - Kinnikinnick Creek
  - Big Darby Creek
  - Walnut Creek
  - Big Walnut Creek
    - Alum Creek
    - Blacklick Creek
    - Duncan Run
  - Olentangy River
  - Little Scioto River (tributary of Scioto River tributary)
    - Honey Creek
    - Rock Fork
  - Long Branch
  - Zeig Ditch
  - Rush Creek
    - McDonald Creek
    - Dudley Run
    - Big Swale
    - Rocky Fork
  - Wildcat Creek
    - Ash Run
    - South Wildcat Creek
  - Panther Creek
  - Jims Creek
  - Wolf Creek
    - Garwood Creek
  - Gander Run
    - Manlove Run
  - Taylor Creek
    - Silver Creek
      - Jordan Run
  - Batchlet Run
    - Payden Run
  - McCoy Run
  - Cooney Ditch
  - Cottonwood Ditch
  - Twin Branches
  - Dunlap Creek
    - Elder Creek
  - Poe Ditch
  - Wallace Fork
- Munn Run

==== Little Scioto River (tributary of Ohio River tributary) ====
- Little Scioto River (tributary of Ohio River tributary)
  - Swauger Valley Run
    - Bonser Run
  - Plum Fork
    - Oven Lick
    - Dry Run
  - Frederick Creek
    - Skull Creek
    - Falls Creek
  - Rocky Fork
    - Long Run
      - Harrison Furnace Creek
      - Tattle Creek
    - Yankee Run
    - Sweet Run
    - Higgins Run
    - McConnel Creek
      - Bull Creek
    - Blue Run
    - Back Run
      - Buck Run
    - Fallen Timber Creek
    - Hunting Run
    - Owl Creek
      - Sand Run
  - Laurel Lick Run
  - Blue Ash Run
    - Bear Run
  - Holland Fork
    - Bucklick Creek
      - Little Bucklick Creek
    - Tattle Creek
    - Scaffold Lick
    - Laurel Fork
  - Buckhorn Creek
  - Sugarcamp Creek
    - Jacko Run
  - Millstone Run
  - Glade Run
    - Dry Run
    - Polecat Creek
  - McDowell Creek
  - Brushy Fork

==== Pine Creek ====
- Pine Creek
  - Lick Run
    - Sugar Creek
    - North Fork Lick Run
  - Duck Creek
    - Poplar Fork
  - Sperry Fork
    - Union Branch
  - Little Pine Creek
    - Darby Creek
    - Cannons Creek
  - Cooney Branch
  - Bear Run
  - Turkeyfoot Run
  - Howard Run
  - Hales Creek
    - Brady Run
    - Jackson Fork
  - Youngs Branch
  - Brushy Fork
  - Olive Creek
  - Afro-American Creek
  - Painter Creek
- Patton Run
- Ginat Creek
- Gervais Run
- Norman Run
- Osburn Run
- Storms Creek
  - Little Storms Creek
  - Hecla Branch
  - Paddle Fork
- Ice Creek
  - Hog Run
  - Little Ice Creek
  - Sugar Creek
  - Turkey Fork
  - Ned Fork
  - Dog Fork
- Lick Creek
- Salliday Creek
- Buffalo Creek

==== Symmes Creek ====
- Symmes Creek

==== Raccoon Creek ====
- Raccoon Creek
  - Wheelabout Creek
  - Little Raccoon Creek
  - Deer Creek
  - Indian Creek
  - Beaver Creek

==== Leading Creek ====
- Leading Creek

==== Shade River ====
- Shade River
  - East Branch Shade River
  - Middle Branch Shade River
  - West Branch Shade River

==== Hocking River ====
- Hocking River
  - Federal Creek
  - Margaret Creek
  - Sunday Creek
  - Monday Creek
  - Threemile Creek
  - Clear Creek
  - Rush Creek
- Swan Run
- Dunfee Run
- Sawyer Run

==== Little Hocking River ====
- Little Hocking River
  - West Branch Little Hocking River
    - Laurel Run
    - Gilbert Run
    - Burnett Run
    - Falls Creek
  - Little West Branch
  - Mill Branch
  - East Branch Little Hocking River
  - Tupper Creek
- Davis Creek
- Congress Run
- Crooked Run
- Mile Run
  - Dodge Run

==== Muskingum River ====
- Muskingum River
  - Cat Creek
  - Big Run
  - Wolf Creek
    - Turkeyhen Run
  - Olive Green

===== Meigs Creek =====
- Meigs Creek
  - Meigs Creek
  - Salt Creek
  - Moxahala Creek

===== Licking River =====
- Licking River
  - Licking River
  - Timber Run
  - Joes Run
  - Bartlett Run
  - Big Run
  - Poverty Run
  - Stump Run
  - Brushy Fork
  - Rocky Fork
  - Bowling Green Run
  - Shawnee Run
  - North Fork Licking River
    - Log Pond Run
    - Dry Creek
    - Clear Fork Licking River
    - Dog Hollow Run
    - North Fork Licking River
    - Sycamore Creek
      - Tuma Run
    - Vance Creek
    - Otter Fork Licking River
      - Bowl Run
    - Webster Run
    - Ford Creek
    - Lake Fork Licking River
      - Sugar Creek
      - Reynolds Creek
  - South Fork Licking River
    - Raccoon Creek
      - Lobdell Creek
      - Moots Run
      - Simpson Run
      - Pet Run
      - Cornell Run
      - Kiber Run

===== Wakatomika Creek =====
- Wakatomika Creek
  - Wakatomika Creek
    - Little Wakatomika Creek

===== Wills Creek =====
  - Wills Creek
    - Salt Fork
    - Crooked Creek
    - Leatherwood Creek
    - Seneca Fork

===== Tuscarawas River =====
  - Tuscarawas River
    - Stillwater Creek
      - Little Stillwater Creek
    - Sugar Creek
    - Conotton Creek
      - Huff Run
      - Beggar Run
      - Dog Run
      - Indian Fork
        - Elliott Run
        - Dellroy Creek
        - Messer Run aka Willow Run
        - Pleasant Valley Run
        - Cold Spring Run
        - Town Creek
        - Gant Creek
      - Thompson Run
      - Holmes Run
      - McGuire Creek
      - Scott Run
      - Dining Fork
      - Irish Creek
      - Jefferson Creek
    - Sandy Creek
      - Nimishillen Creek
        - Middle Branch Nimishillen Creek
        - East Branch Nimishillen Creek
        - West Branch Nimishillen Creek
      - Indian Run
      - Little Sandy Creek
      - Middle Run
      - Armstrong Run
      - Pipe Run
      - Hugle Run
      - Still Fork
      - Middle Branch Sandy Creek
      - Conser Run
    - Sippo Creek
    - Newman Creek
    - Chippewa Creek
      - Styx River
    - Wolf Creek
      - Schocalog Run

===== Walhonding River =====
  - Walhonding River
    - Mill Creek
    - Killbuck Creek

===== Kokosing River =====
    - Kokosing River
      - North Branch Kokosing River

===== Mohican River =====
    - Mohican River
      - Lake Fork Mohican River
        - Muddy Fork Mohican River
        - Jerome Fork
      - Black Fork Mohican River
        - Rocky Fork
      - Clear Fork Mohican River
        - Cedar Fork

==== Duck Creek ====
- Duck Creek
  - Unnamed Stream
    - Burch's Run
    - Afro-American Run
  - Sugar Creek
  - Reeds Run
  - Whipple Run
  - East Fork Duck Creek
    - Pawpaw Creek
    - Middle Fork Duck Creek
      - Otterslide Creek
      - Mare Run
      - Camp Run
    - Rocky Run
    - Creighton Run
    - Road Fork
      - Flag Run
    - Schwab Run
    - Elk Fork
      - Greasy Run
      - McBride Run
    - Barnes Run
    - West Branch East Fork Duck Creek
    - Wolfpen Run
  - West Fork Duck Creek
    - Goose Hollow
    - Buffalo Run
    - Warren Run
    - Elk Run
    - Otter Run
    - Dog Run
    - Wolf Run
    - Johnny Woods River
    - Lick Run

==== Little Muskingum River ====
- Little Muskingum River
  - Mill Run
    - Coal Run
  - Lick Run
  - Long Run
  - Eightmile Creek
    - Potpie Run
  - Cow Run
  - Moss Run
    - Baker Run
  - Fifteen Mile Creek
    - Goss Fork
    - Deans Fork
    - Sycamore Fork
  - Bear Run
  - Hog Run
  - Archers Fork
    - Ward Branch
    - Coal Run
    - Cady Run
    - Jackson Run
    - Irish Run
  - Wingett Run
  - Haught Run
  - Sackett Run
  - Tice Run
  - Wilson Run
  - Clear Fork
    - Witten Run
    - Rias Run
    - Indian Run
    - Robinson Run
    - Death Run
      - Devoa Run
  - Oldcamp Run
  - Straight Fork
  - Browns Run
  - Biglick Run
    - Pigeonroost Run
  - Rockcamp Run
  - Laurel Run
  - Witten Fork
    - Trail Run
    - Dogskin Run
    - Wildcat Run
    - Dismal Creek
    - Walnutcamp Run
    - Alum Run
    - Millers Fork
    - Woods Run
  - Coal Run
  - Haren Run
  - Buhrs Run
  - Wolfpen Run
  - Town Fork
    - Rich Fork
      - Left Prong
    - Brister Fork
  - Cranenest Fork
    - Mutton Run

==== Sheets Run ====
- Sheets Run
- Allen Run
- Bells Run
- Newell Run
  - Northup Run
  - Kerr Run
  - Bolivian Run
- Danas Run
- Reynolds Run
- Davis Run
- Reas Run
- Leith Run
- Sheets Run
- Collins Run
- Mill Creek
- Jims Run
- Miller Run
- Deadhorse Run
- Parker Run
- Barnes Run
- Narrows Run
- Patton Run
- Pool Run
- Havely Run
- Texas Creek
- Bares Run
- Fisher Run
- Ueltsch Run
- Narrows Run
- Littman Run
- Muhleman Run

==== Opossum Creek ====
- Opossum Creek
  - Gilmore Run
  - Alum Creek
  - Watkins Fork
  - Pine Run
  - Oliver Run
  - Wildcat Run
- Bishop Creek

==== Sunfish Creek ====
- Sunfish Creek
  - Afro-American Run
  - Paine Run
  - Ackerson Run
  - Piney Fork
    - East Fork Piney Fork
  - Standingstone Run
  - Death Creek
  - Baker Fork
    - Grassy Creek
  - Wheeler Run
- Gardner Run
- Stillhouse Run
- Blair Run
- Big Run

==== Captina Creek ====
- Captina Creek
  - Cat Run
  - Moore Run
  - Peavine Run
  - Rocky Fork
  - Anderson Run
  - Bend Fork
    - Millers Run
    - Joy Fork
    - Packsaddle Run
  - Crabapple Creek
  - Piney Creek
    - Long Run
  - Casey Run
  - Berrys Run
    - Reeves Hollow
  - Mikes Run
  - South Fork Captina Creek
    - Brushy Creek
    - Flag Run
    - Cranenest Creek
    - Millers Run
    - Slope Creek
  - North Fork Captina Creek
    - Jakes Run
    - Long Run
- Little Captina Creek
- Pipe Creek
- Big Run
- Wegee Creek

==== McMahon Creek ====
- McMahon Creek
  - Brooks Run
  - Trough Run
  - Rock Run
  - Little McMahon Creek
    - Stillhouse Run
    - Kings Run
    - Aults Run
    - Chambers Run
  - Williams Creek
  - Welsh Run
  - Porterfield Run
  - Hutchison Run
  - Neffs Run
    - Anderson Run
  - Brush Run
  - Roberts Run
  - Barkcamp Creek
- Indian Run
- Whiskey Run
- Moore Run

==== Wheeling Creek ====
- Wheeling Creek
  - Frazier Run
  - Slaughterhouse Run
  - Flat Run
  - McMonies Run
  - Steep Run
  - Town Run
  - Fall Run
  - Jug Run
  - Sloan Run
  - Cox Run
    - Patton Run
  - Pogue Run
  - Loves Run
  - McCracken Run
  - Crabapple Creek
    - Campbell Creek
      - Ross Run
- Glenns Run
  - Nixon Run
  - Patton Run
  - Buckeye Run
- Patton Run
- Deep Run

==== Short Creek ====
- Short Creek
  - Williamson Run
  - Little Short Creek
    - Parkers Run
    - Coal Run
  - Jug Run
  - Dry Fork
  - Piney Fork
    - Cabbage Fork
    - Henderson Creek
    - Thompson Creek
    - Little Piney Fork
    - Harrah Run
  - Long Run
  - Perrin Run
  - Goose Run
  - North Fork Short Creek
    - Coal Run
    - Flag Run
    - Skelley Run
  - Middle Fork Short Creek
  - South Fork Short Creek
- Little Rush Run
- Rush Run
  - Blues Run
- Salt Run
- Tarrs Run

==== Cross Creek ====
- Cross Creek
  - Dry Fork
  - McIntyre Creek
    - Longs Run
    - Polecat Hollow
    - Slabcamp Creek
    - Slab Run
    - Little McIntyre Creek
  - Cedar Lick Run
  - Cedar Lick Creek
  - Salem Creek
    - Grassy Run
    - Lea Branch
  - North Branch Cross Creek
- Wells Run
  - Permars Run
- Wills Creek
  - Rush Run
  - Cedar Creek
  - North Fork Wills Creek
- Island Creek
  - Little Island Creek
  - Hale Run
  - Shelley Run
- Croxton Run
- Jeremy Run
- Goose Run
- Brimstone Run

==== Yellow Creek ====
- Yellow Creek
  - Rocky Run
  - Hollow Rock Run
    - Tarburner Run
    - Carter Run
  - North Fork Yellow Creek
    - Dry Run
    - Salt Run
    - Salibury Run
    - Nancy Run
      - Roses Run
    - Riley Run
  - Brush Creek
    - Dennis Run
    - Roach Run
  - Lowery Run
  - Town Fork
    - Dry Run
    - Culp Run
    - Rippy Run
  - Long Run
    - Hildebrand Run
  - Roach Run
  - Ralston Run
    - Mathews Run
  - Upper North Fork Yellow Creek
    - Hump Run
      - Burgett Run
      - Carroll Run
    - Hazel Run
  - Elkhorn Creek
    - Strawcamp Run
    - Center Fork Elkhorn Creek
      - Trail Run
      - Frog Run
  - Wolf Creek
  - Cox Creek
  - Goose Creek
  - Elk Fork
  - Elk Lick
- McQueen Run
- Little Yellow Creek
  - Alder Lick Run
- Wells Run
- California Hollow

==== Little Beaver Creek ====
- Little Beaver Creek
  - Island Run
  - Bieler Run
  - North Fork Little Beaver Creek
    - Pine Run
    - Brush Run
    - Bull Creek
      - Leslie Run
        - Sulphur Run
      - Little Bull Creek
        - Turkey Run
    - Coalbank Run
    - Painters Run
    - Dilworth Run
    - McCautry Run
    - Jordan Run
    - Madden Run
    - Beaverdam Run
    - Honey Creek
      - Harman Run
  - Rough Run
  - Longs Run
  - Middle Fork Little Beaver Creek
    - Turkeyfoot Run
    - Pine Run
    - Elk Run
    - Middle Run
    - Stone Mill Run
    - East Branch Middle Fork Little Beaver Creek
      - Cherry Valley Run
  - West Fork Little Beaver Creek
    - Patterson Creek
    - Peters Run
    - Brush Creek
    - McCormick Run
    - Big Creek
      - Williard Run
    - Cold Run

==== Mahoning River ====
- Mahoning River
  - Hickory Creek
  - Coffee Run
  - Grays Run
  - Hines Run
  - Godward Run
  - Yellow Creek
  - Mill Creek
    - Burgess Run
  - Pine Hollow Creek
  - Dry Run
  - Crab Creek
    - Kimmel Brook
  - Mill Creek
    - Bears Den Run
    - Ax Factory Run
    - Andersons Run
    - Cranberry Run
    - Indian Run
    - Saw Mill Run
    - Turkey Creek
  - Fourmile Run
  - Squaw Creek
  - Meander Creek
    - Morrison Creek
    - Sawmill Creek
    - West Branch Meander Creek
  - Mosquito Creek
    - Spring Run
    - Big Run
    - Confusion Run
    - Walnut Creek
    - Mud Creek
      - Smith Run
  - Mud Creek
  - Red Run
  - Duck Creek
    - Little Duck Creek
    - East Branch Duck Creek
  - Chocolate Run
  - Eagle Creek
    - Tinker Creek
      - Nelson Ditch
    - South Fork Eagle Creek
      - Sand Creek
    - Camp Creek
    - Silver Creek
    - Black Creek
  - West Branch Mahoning River
    - Silver Creek
    - Hinkley Creek
    - Bixon Creek
    - Barrel Run
    - Harmon Brook
  - Kale Creek
  - Charley Run Creek
  - Mill Creek
    - Turkey Broth Creek
  - Island Creek
  - Willow Creek
  - Deer Creek
  - Beech Creek
    - Little Beech Creek
  - Fish Creek
  - Beaver Run

==== Shenango River ====
  - Shenango River
    - Deer Creek
    - Little Yankee Creek
      - Little Deer Creek
    - Yankee Creek
      - South Branch Yankee Run
    - Pymatuning Creek
      - Booth Run
      - Mill Creek
      - Stratton Creek
        - Maple Creek
      - Sugar Creek
        - Berry Creek
      - Clear Creek
    - Sugar Run
    - McMichael Creek
    - Black Creek
    - Gravel Run

== See also ==
- List of rivers in the United States
