= Cossett Creek =

Stream in Medina County, Ohio, US

Coordinates: 41°13′38″N 81°55′22″W

Cossett Creek is a stream located entirely within Medina County, Ohio. The 5.2-mile (8.4 km) long stream is a tributary of the West Branch Rocky River.

Cossett Creek was named for a pioneer who settled there.

== See also ==
- List of rivers of Ohio
