= Salt Run (Noble County, Ohio) =

Stream in Noble County, Ohio, U.S.

Coordinates: 39°44′34″N 81°30′45″W

Salt Run is a stream in Noble County, Ohio.

Salt Run was historically known for its salt production industry.

== See also ==
- List of rivers of Ohio
