= Kinnikinnick Creek =

Kinnikinnick Creek is a shallow waterway that is part of the Scioto River watershed, flowing through southern Pickaway and northern Ross Counties in Ohio. The area through which the creek flows, which includes the villages of Wisler, Kingston and Kinnikinnick, Ohio is known locally as the Kinnikinnick Prairie.

The Kinnikinnick has two branches, the main (north) branch, and the south branch. The creek’s northern headwaters form near the Pickaway County village of Leistville, Ohio, and flow south to the confluence of the creek’s southern branch, which has its head waters in Ross County. There, the creek begins its west-southwest path until it merges with the Scioto River north of the city of Chillicothe, Ohio.

The creek was named for the Native American tobacco product kinnikinnick. The creek was a resource for Native Americans in the days before European Settlement. When white settlers moved into the region around 1800, Kinnikinnick was a significant source of fresh water for consumption, and crop irrigation.

The Kinnikinnick is considered a major waterway feeder for the Scioto River by Ohio State University Extension Services. Portions are navigable by canoe.

== Location ==
- Mouth: North of Chillicothe at 39°26′28″N 82°58′45″W
- Source: Pickaway County at 39°31′11″N 82°52′15″W

== See also ==
- List of rivers of Ohio
