= Green Creek (Ohio) =

River in Ohio, United States

Physical characteristics
- Source
  - location: Pleasant Township, Seneca County, Ohio
  - coordinates: 41°13′47″N 83°04′39″W
  - elevation: 703 ft (214 m)
- Mouth
  - location: Confluence with Sandusky River at Lake Erie
  - coordinates: 41°26′36″N 83°00′42″W
  - elevation: 568 ft (173 m)

Basin features
- Progression: Green Creek → Sandusky River → Lake Erie → Great Lakes → Saint Lawrence River → Gulf of Saint Lawrence
- GNIS ID: 1066024

Green Creek is a 21.6-mile-long (34.8 km) tributary to the Sandusky River in the northern part of the U.S. state of Ohio. It connects Mineral Springs at the village of Green Springs to the Sandusky River.

Green Creek was so named on account of the mineral-stained rocks along its course.

== See also ==
- List of rivers of Ohio
