= Archers Fork =

Stream in Washington County, Ohio

Coordinates: 39°28′56″N 81°15′54″W

Archers Fork is a stream located entirely within Washington County, Ohio. It is a tributary of the Little Muskingum River, which it enters near the community of Dart.

Archers Fork was named for one Mr. Archer, an early settler.

== See also ==
- List of rivers of Ohio
