= Ottawa River (Lake Erie) =

Coordinates: 41.7417°N 83.4610°W

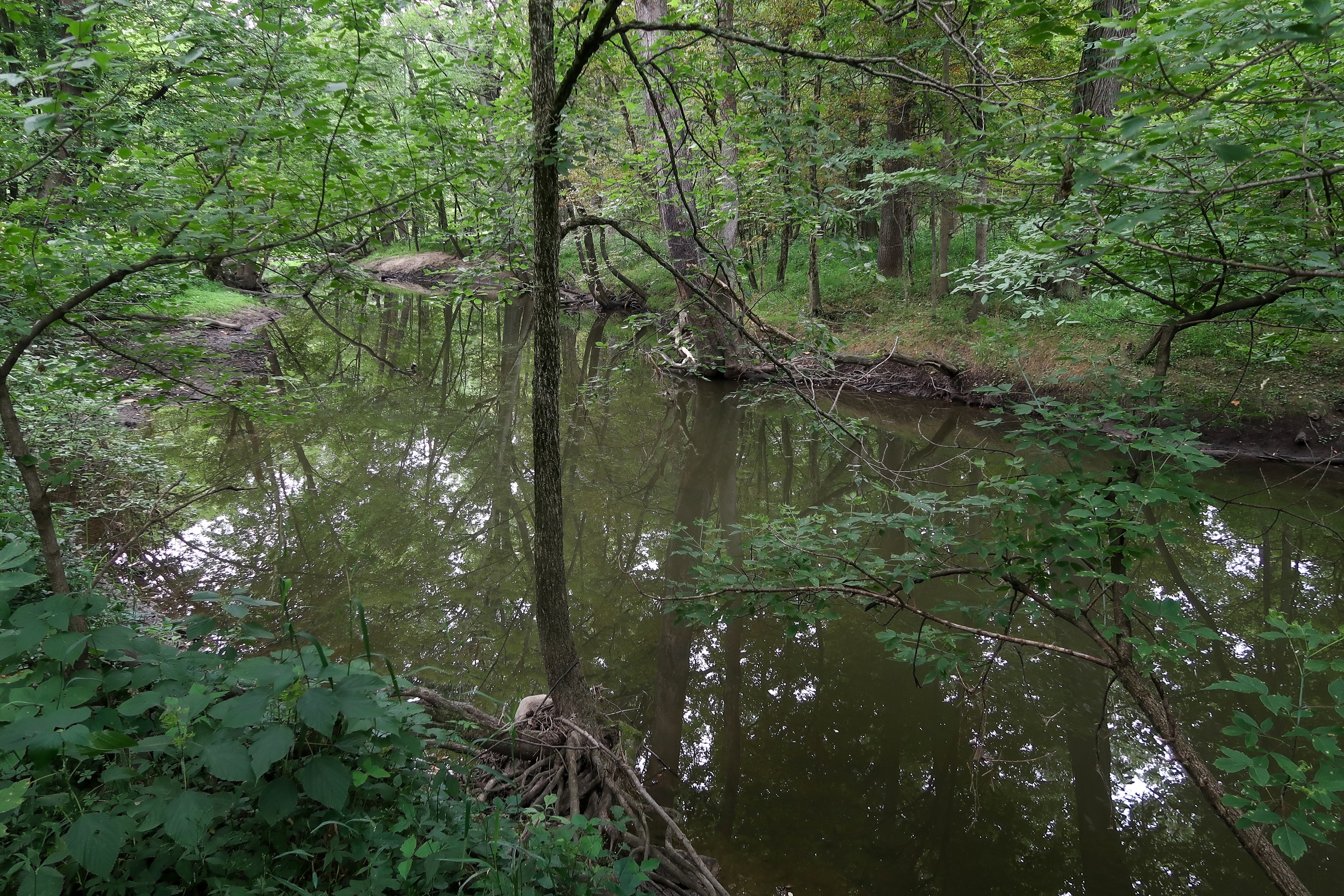
- The Ottawa River in Wildwood Preserve Metropark

Location
- Country: United States

Physical characteristics
- Source
  - location: Southeast Michigan
- Mouth
  - location: Lake Erie
- Length: 15 mi (24 km)

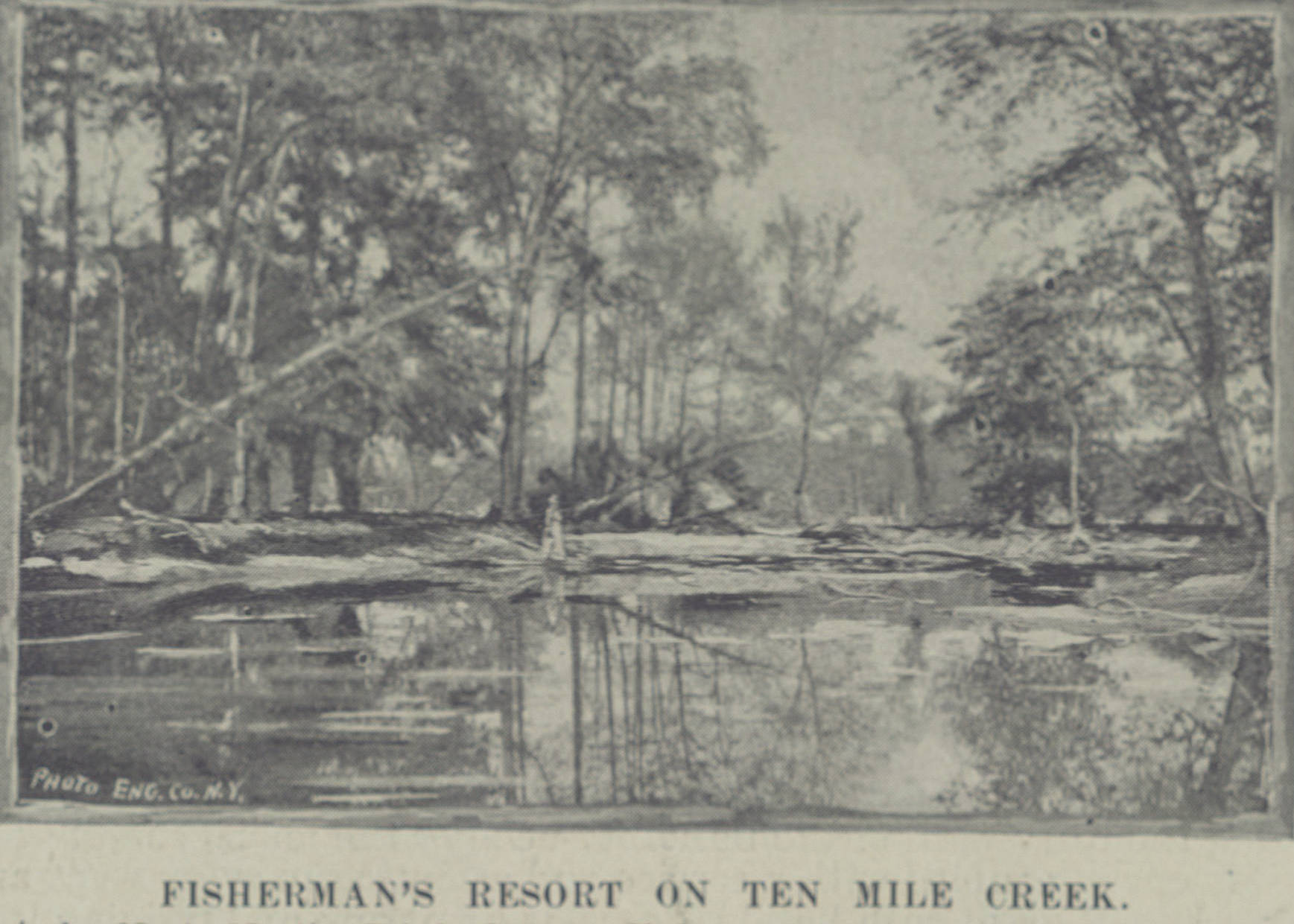
Illustration of Tenmile Creek from "Picturesque Maumee," 1892

The Ottawa River, also known as Ottawa Creek, is a short river, approximately 20 miles (32 km) long (or about 48 miles (77 km) if Tenmile Creek, the longest tributary, is included), in northwest Ohio and southeast Michigan in the United States. It drains an area on the Ohio-Michigan border along the eastern and northern fringes of the city of Toledo, goes through Ottawa Hills, and empties directly into Lake Erie. It is one of two rivers in northwestern Ohio that share the same name, along with the Ottawa River that is a tributary of the Auglaize River. The upper 4 miles (6 km) of the river in Michigan north of Sylvania, Ohio is called North Tenmile Creek on federal maps, while another branch rising in Fulton County, Ohio, is called Tenmile Creek.

North Tenmile Creek rises in extreme southeastern Michigan, southwest of Ottawa Lake, approximately 3 miles (5 km) north of the Ohio-Michigan state line. The creek flows south across the state line to Sylvania, where it is joined by Tenmile Creek to form the Ottawa River, approximately 5 miles (8 km) northwest of Toledo. The river then flows southeast into western Toledo, where it turns northeast. For its lower 5 miles (8 km) it flows along the north side of Toledo roughly parallel to the Maumee River, separated from it by approximately 2 miles (3 km). It crosses the Michigan state line for its final 1 mile (1.6 km), entering Little Maumee Bay on Lake Erie.

== Pollutants ==
The water quality assessment of the lower section of the Ottawa River found many chemicals in the water with a hazard quotient greater than 1 (from highest to lowest concentration): lead, aluminum, PCBs, manganese, iron, DDT, thallium, selenium, chromium, nickel, cadmium, cyanide, and zinc.

The poor water quality results primarily from the river's form and structure, since it has a slow flow, and, secondly, from urban runoff and discharge from landfills and sewers. The City of Toledo has made it a priority to clean up the river. It has taken action to clear landfills and tributaries.

== Dam removal ==
In 2001, the U.S. Fish and Wildlife Service proposed the removal of a long-standing dam in the Ottawa Hills stretch of the river to return the waterway to its natural flow and promote fish migration. It was also mentioned that the dam was a liability for the village. One dam was removed in 2007 and another in 2020.

== See also ==
- List of Michigan rivers
- List of rivers of Ohio
