= Butler Run =

Stream in Delaware County, Ohio, United States

Coordinates: 40°16′12″N 82°54′3″W

Butler Run is a stream located entirely within Delaware County, Ohio.

Butler Run was named for one Mr. Butler, a pioneer who settled near its banks in 1807.

== See also ==
- List of rivers of Ohio
