= Duncan Run =

Stream in Ohio, U.S.

Coordinates: 40°08′45″N 82°51′26″W

Duncan Run is a stream in the U.S. state of Ohio. It runs through Harlem township and flows into Hoover reservoir.

Duncan Run was named for a 19th-century landowner.

== See also ==
- List of rivers of Ohio
