= Meigs Creek (Muskingum River tributary) =

Stream in Ohio, U.S.

Coordinates: 39°36′15″N 81°42′52″W

Meigs Creek is a stream in the U.S. state of Ohio. It is a tributary of the Muskingum River.

Meigs Creek was named for Return J. Meigs Jr., fourth governor of Ohio.

== See also ==
- List of rivers of Ohio
