= Turkeyhen Run =

Stream in Washington County, Ohio

Coordinates: 39°24′45″N 81°35′12″W

Turkeyhen Run (also called Turkey Hen Creek) is a stream entirely within Washington County, Ohio. It is a 4.5 mile long tributary of the south branch of Wolf Creek, which flows into the Muskingum River.

Turkeyhen Run was so named by a group of hunters from Virginia, who to their dismay, caught only a turkey hen.

== See also ==
- List of rivers of Ohio
