= Lake Fork Mohican River =

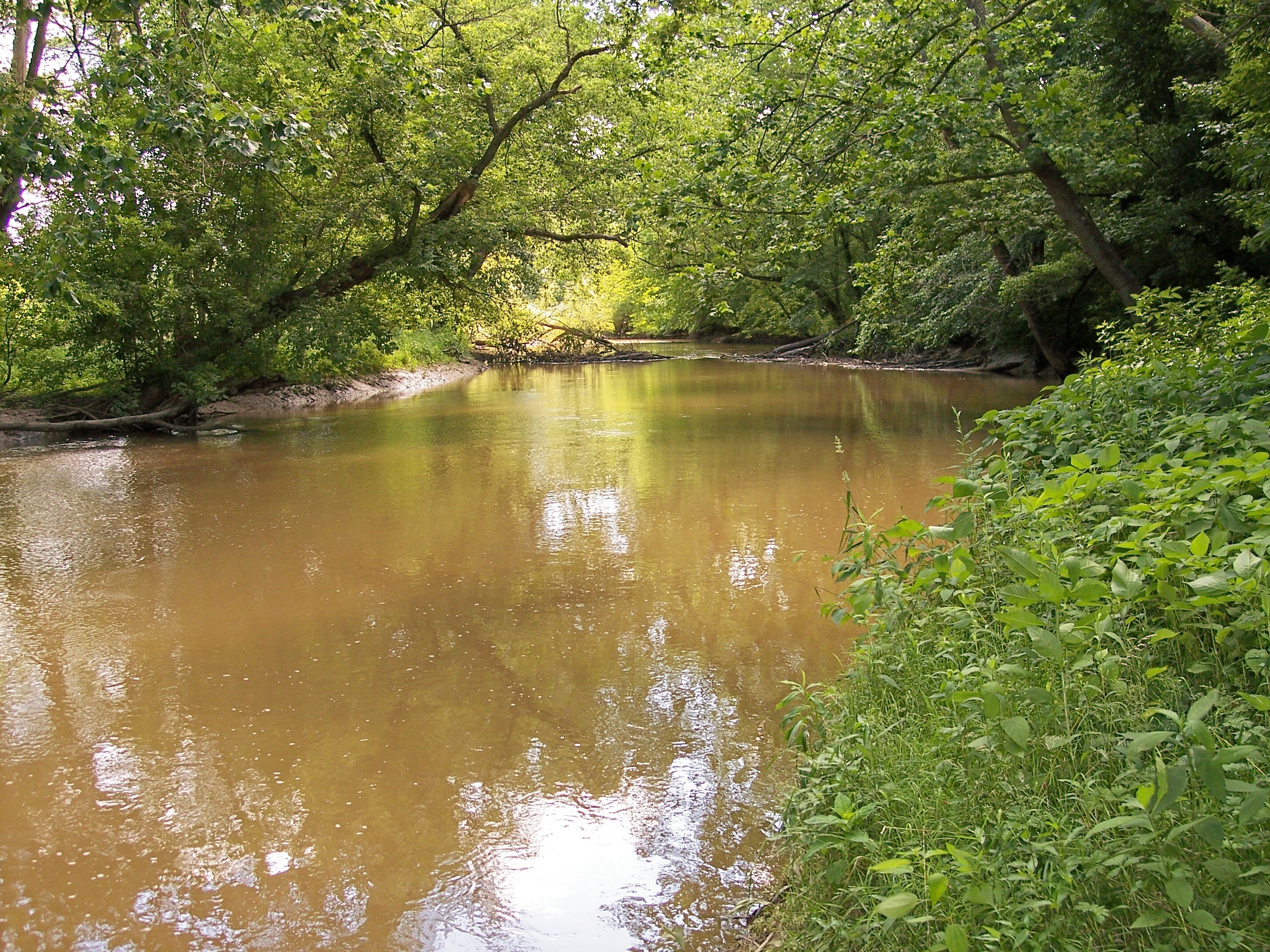
- The Lake Fork downstream of the Mohicanville Dam in southeastern Ashland County, Ohio

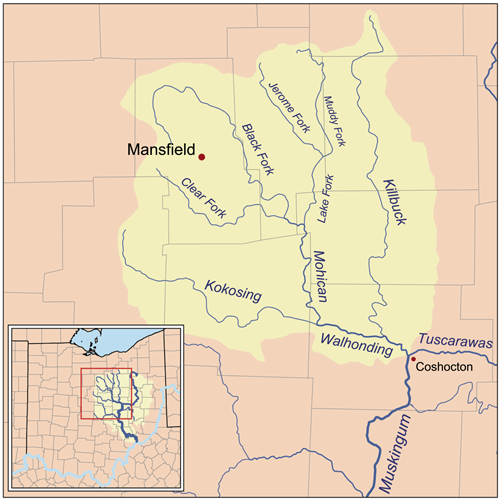
- Map of the Walhonding River watershed showing the Lake Fork Mohican River

Location
- Country: United States

Physical characteristics
- Source
  - location: confluence of Jerome Fork and Muddy Fork in southeastern Ashland County
  - coordinates: 40°45′01″N 82°07′59″W
- Mouth
  - location: Mohican River, northwestern Holmes County, Ohio
  - coordinates: 40°35′36″N 82°11′36″W
- Length: 14.7 mi (23.7 km)
- Basin size: 344 sq mi (890 km^{2})
- Discharge
  - location: USGS gauge near Loudonville
  - average: 302.1 cu ft/s (8.55 m^{3}/s), water years 1932 and 1936-1938
- Discharge
  - location: mouth
  - average: 348.5 cu ft/s (9.87 m^{3}/s) (estimate)

The Lake Fork is a tributary of the Mohican River, 14.7 miles (23.7 km) long, in north-central Ohio in the United States. Via the Mohican, Walhonding, Muskingum and Ohio Rivers, it is part of the watershed of the Mississippi River, draining an area of 344 square miles (890 km^{2}).

The Lake Fork is formed by the confluence of the Jerome Fork and the Muddy Fork in southeastern Ashland County, and flows generally south-southwestwardly into northwestern Holmes County, where it joins the Mohican River, about 3.5 miles (5.6 km) southeast of Loudonville.

In Ashland County, a 1936 U.S. Army Corps of Engineers dam causes the river to form Mohicanville Lake.

== See also ==
- List of rivers of Ohio
