= Fort Amanda =

Historic site in Auglaize County, Ohio, U.S.

- U.S. National Register of Historic Places
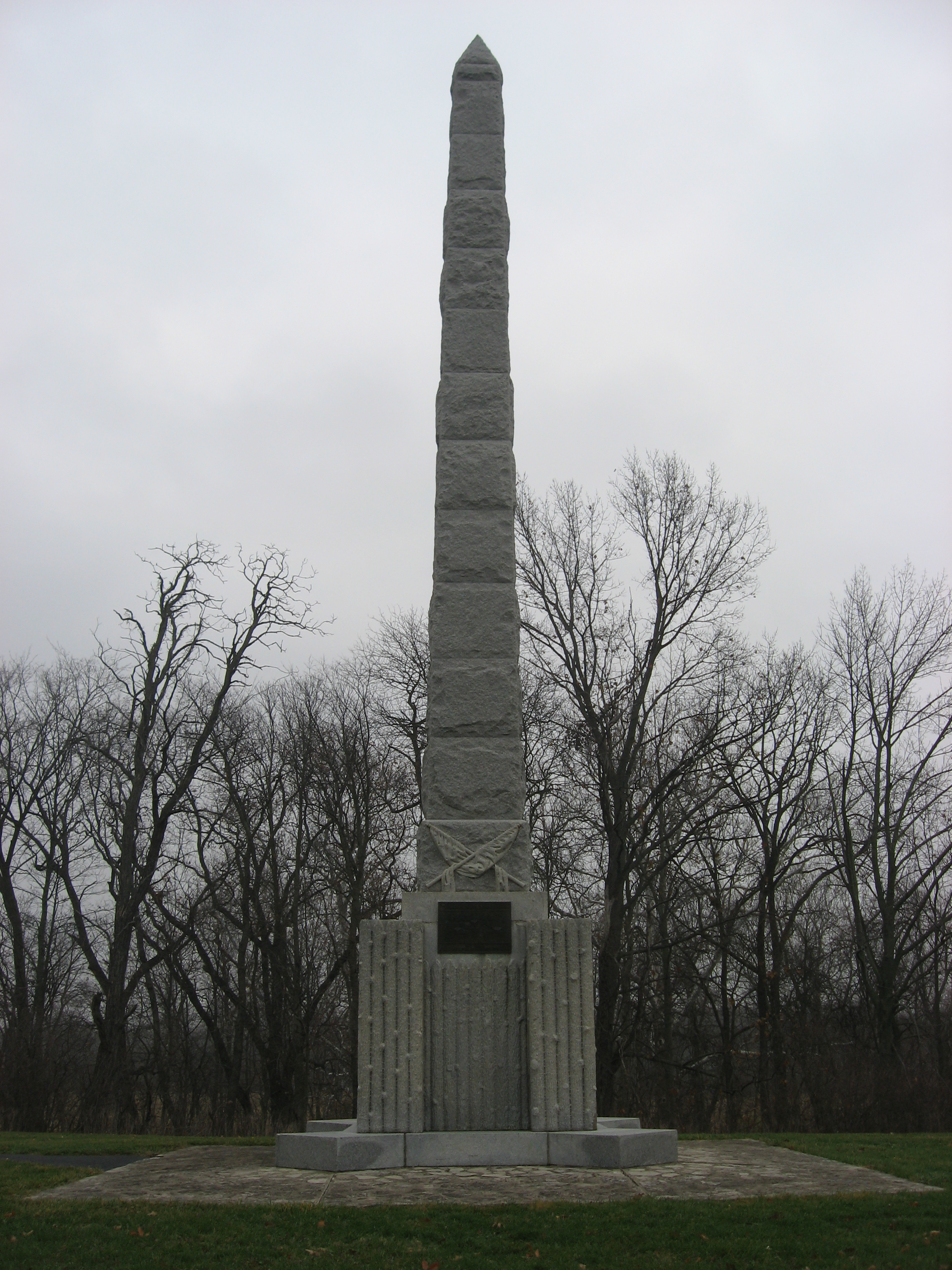
- Fort Amanda's obelisk in 2009

- Location within Ohio Location within the United States
- Location: State Route 198, Logan Township, Auglaize County, Ohio, U.S.
- Nearest city: Wapakoneta, Ohio
- Coordinates: 40.6805°N 84.2679°W
- Built: 1812
- NRHP reference No.: 70000484
- Added to NRHP: November 10, 1970

Fort Amanda was a historic U.S. Army military supply depot located in Logan Township, Auglaize County, Ohio, on the west bank of the Auglaize River. Built during the War of 1812 on the order of William Henry Harrison, it was abandoned in 1815. It was listed in the National Register of Historic Places on November 10, 1970.

A granite obelisk was built in 1915 where the fort used to stand. The fort is named after Hannah Amanda, the daughter of Lieutenant Colonel Robert Pogue. Fort Amanda Memorial Park, which includes what used to be Fort Amanda, is managed by the Johnny Appleseed Metropolitan Park District and owned by Ohio History Connection. An Ohio Historical Marker was unveiled in 2000.

== History ==
Following the surrender of Detroit during the War of 1812, William Henry Harrison, then an army general, ordered multiple forts to be constructed to help defend in the event of an invasion of Ohio. These forts were constructed in a corridor between Piqua and Fort Meigs, which would later become Perrysburg. Construction on Fort Amanda began during the fall of 1812 as ordered by Lieutenant Colonel Robert Pogue. Four two-story homes were built in the fort, as well as a small dock to carry soldiers and supplies up to Detroit via pirogues. It was expanded in 1813 at the order of Captain Daniel Hosbrook. The fort was abandoned in 1815.

Following the abandonment of Fort Amanda in 1814, settlers took over the buildings and grounds. The fort was used as the main post office for Allen County beginning in 1817. The State of Ohio purchased the land on which Fort Amanda stood for $1.00 in 1913.

A memorial granite obelisk was built where the main fort used to stand in 1915. A historic cemetery is also present.
