= Salt Run (Warren County, Ohio) =

Coordinates: 39°17′44″N 84°15′20″W

Salt Run is a stream located entirely within Warren County, Ohio.

Salt Run was named for the salt lick along its course.

== See also ==
- List of rivers of Ohio
