= Slabcamp Run =

Stream in Brown County, Ohio, U.S.

Coordinates: 39°00′18″N 83°49′26″W

Slabcamp Run is a stream in Brown County, Ohio. It is a tributary of White Oak Creek.

According to tradition, Slabcamp Run was so named on account of the ruins of a Native American camping ground being discovered there by early white settlers.

== See also ==
- List of rivers of Ohio
