= Ohio Brush Creek =

River in US

Coordinates: 38.6737°N 83.4527°W

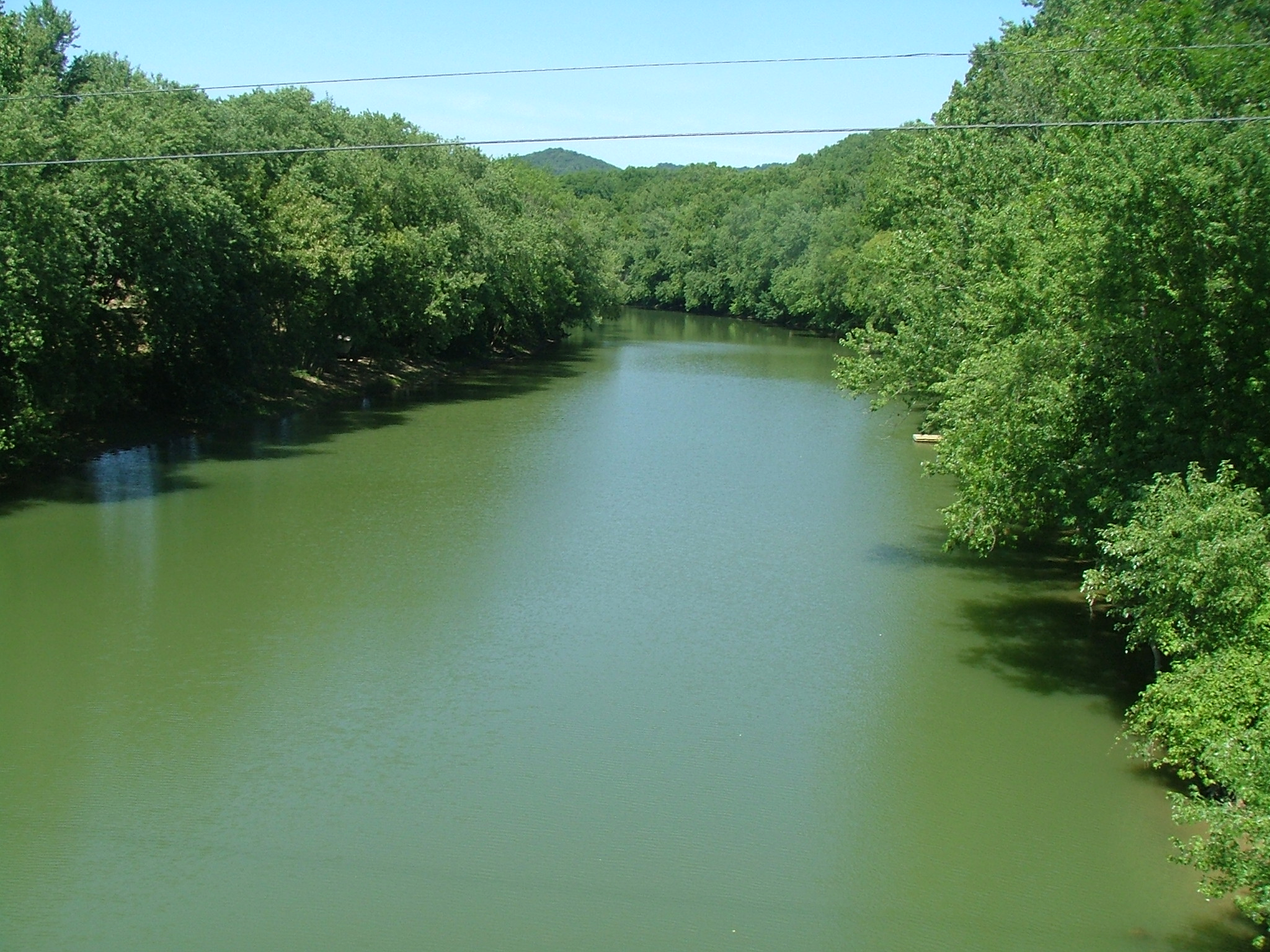
- Ohio Brush Creek near the Ohio River from US 52

Physical characteristics
- Source
  - location: ~ 4 mile (6 km) south of Hillsboro
  - elevation: ~ 1,000 ft (300 m)
- Mouth
  - location: Ohio River about 4 mi (6.4 km) west of Rome
  - elevation: 485 ft (148 m)
- Basin size: 435 mi^{2} (1,130 km^{2})
- Discharge
  - location: West Union
  - average: 468.1 cu ft/s (13.26 m^{3}/s), USGS water years 1927-2019

Ohio Brush Creek is a 59.9-mile-long (96.4 km) tributary of the Ohio River in southern Ohio in the United States. Via the Ohio River, it is part of the watershed of the Mississippi River, draining an area of 435 square miles (1,130 km^{2}). According to the Geographic Names Information System, it has also been known historically as "Brush Creek", "Elk Creek", and "Little Scioto River".

Ohio Brush Creek rises in southeastern Highland County, and flows generally southwardly into Adams County, past the Serpent Mound, to its confluence at the Ohio River, about 4 miles (6.4 km) west of Rome.

== See also ==
- List of rivers of Ohio
