= Brewster Creek =

Coordinates: 41°02′01″N 81°29′59″W

Brewster Creek is located in the Firestone Park area of Akron, Ohio and is a vital drainage waterway for the region.

The length of the creek is nearly 5.5 miles (8.9 kilometers) with an average width of 13 feet (4.0 meters). The creek originates near Arlington Road and ultimately drains in Nesmith Lake off Manchester Road. Brewster Creek is notorious for flooding at the crossing of Waterloo Road near the Brewster Creek Apartments during long periods of substantial rainfall. The flooding is mainly due to the highly graded hills on the western side of the creek that contribute to considerable amounts of runoff. The creek is also constricted near crossing roads due to drainage cylinders. Brewster Creek averages several floods a year with nearly all occurring in the summer months.

== See also ==
- List of rivers of Ohio
