= Flatrock Creek (Auglaize River tributary) =

River in Indiana and Ohio, United States

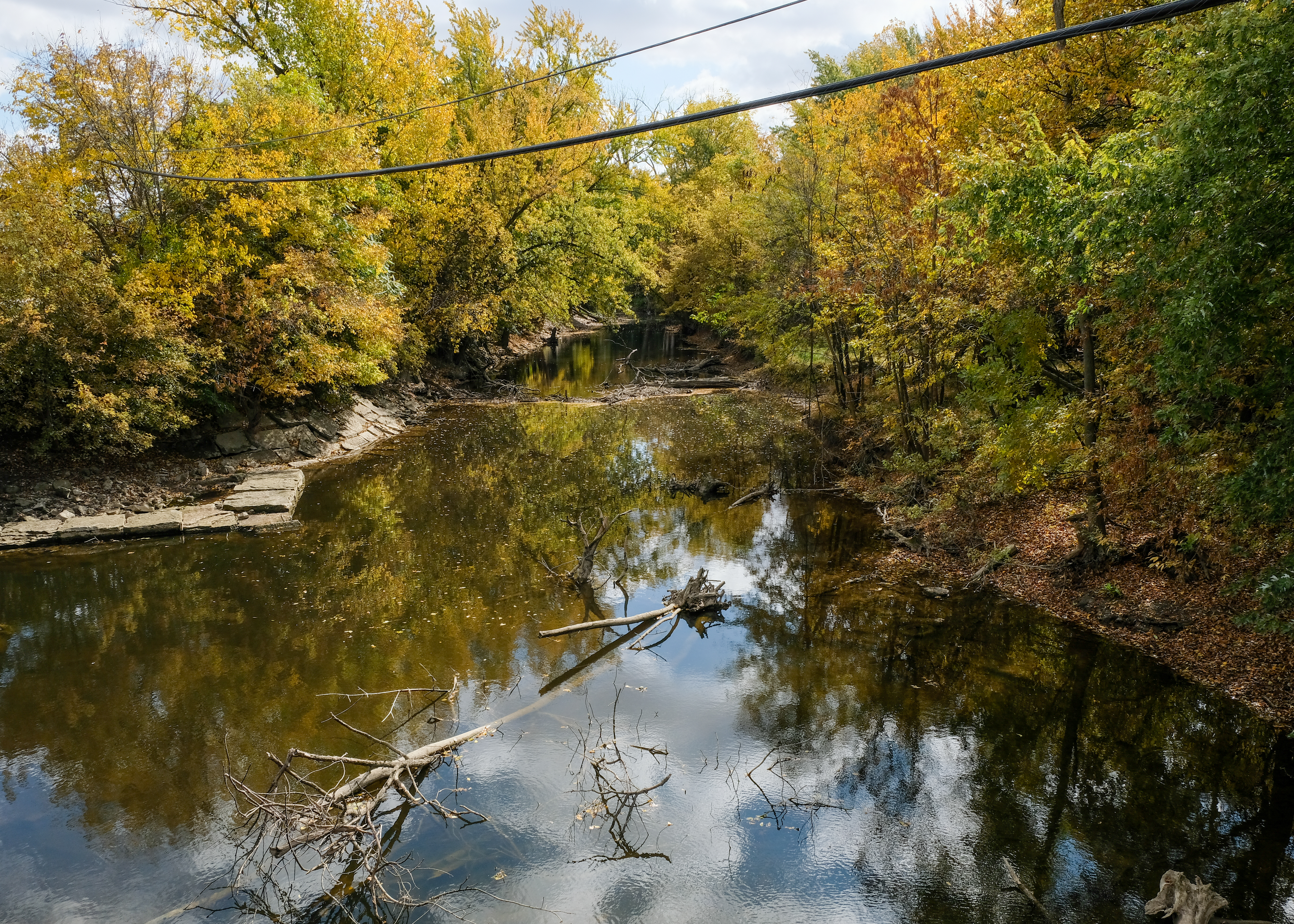
Flatrock Creek in Paulding, Ohio, in October 2022

Flatrock Creek is a 57.2-mile-long (92.1 km) tributary of the Auglaize River in northeastern Indiana and northwestern Ohio in the United States. It drains a primarily rural farming area in the watershed of Lake Erie.

It rises in a group of headwater streams along the border between Adams County, Indiana and Van Wert County, Ohio, approximately 8 miles (13 km) northeast of Decatur, Indiana. The creek flows northwest from Ohio into eastern Allen County, Indiana, then turns northeast at Monroeville, Indiana and flows into Paulding County, Ohio, past Payne and Paulding. It joins the Auglaize from the west approximately 10 miles (16 km) southwest of Defiance at 41°10′34″N 84°26′27″W.

== See also ==
- List of rivers of Indiana
- List of rivers of Ohio
