= Little Auglaize River =

River in Ohio, United States

Coordinates: 41.1117°N 84.4152°W

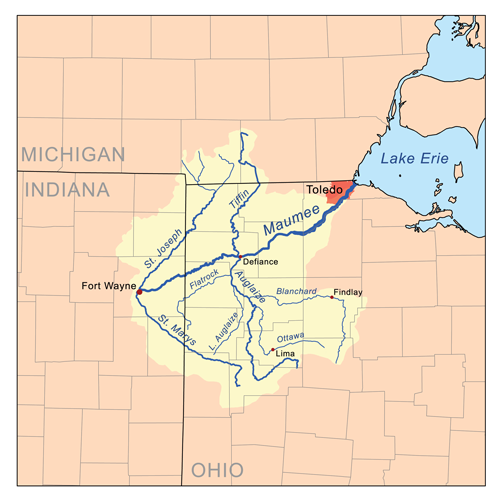
Map of the Maumee River watershed showing the Little Auglaize River.

The Little Auglaize River is a 47.0-mile-long (75.6 km) tributary of the Auglaize River in northwest Ohio in the United States. It drains a primarily rural farming area in the watershed of Lake Erie.

It rises in southern Van Wert County, approximately 10 miles (16 km) south of Van Wert. It flows northeast past Middle Point. Near Ottoville in western Putnam County it turns north-northwest for its lower 10 miles (16 km) and joins the Auglaize from the south near Melrose in eastern Paulding County.

== See also ==
- List of rivers of Ohio
