= Solomon Run =

Stream in Ohio, U.S.

Coordinates: 39°11′23″N 83°56′10″W

Solomon Run is a stream in the U.S. state of Ohio.

Solomon Run was named for Solomon Claypool, an early settler.

== See also ==
- List of rivers of Ohio
