= Styx River (Ohio) =

Stream in Ohio, U.S.

Coordinates: 40°57′32″N 81°45′54″W

Styx River is a stream in the U.S. state of Ohio.

The river was named after the Styx, a river in Greek mythology.

== See also ==
- List of rivers of Ohio
