= Raccoon Creek (Ohio) =

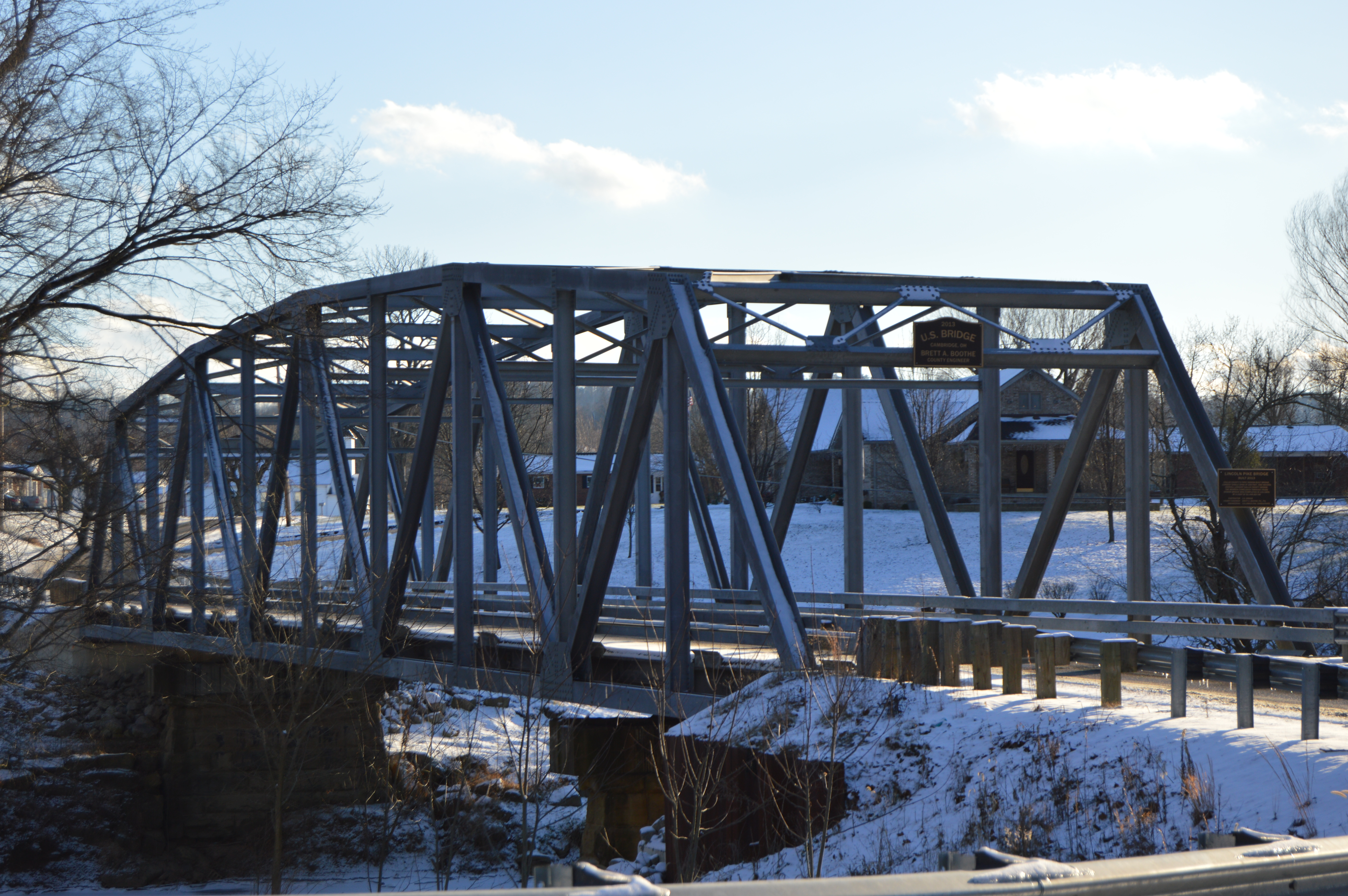
Bridge at Northup

Raccoon Creek is a 114-mile-long (183 km) stream that drains parts of five Ohio counties in the United States. It originates in Hocking County, Ohio. It flows through Vinton County and Gallia County and a corner of Meigs County. Its largest tributary, Little Raccoon Creek, arises in Jackson County. The watershed also includes part of Athens County, drained by another tributary, Hewett Fork. The other major tributaries are Elk Fork, located entirely in Vinton County, and Brushy Fork, which is mostly in Vinton County with a small area in Hocking County.

== Location ==
- Mouth: Confluence with the Ohio River in Gallia County at 38°43′28″N 82°11′25″W
- Origin: Confluence of the East and West Branches of Raccoon Creek near New Plymouth in Vinton County at 39°22′44″N 82°23′43″W

== Discharge ==
The USGS stream gauge on Raccoon Creek at Adamsville recorded a mean annual discharge of 651.2 cubic feet per second (18.44 m^{3}/s) during water years 1916–2019. The gauge on Little Raccoon Creek at Ewington recorded a mean annual discharge of 120.1 cubic feet per second (3.40 m^{3}/s) during water years 1999–2019.

== Organizations ==
The Raccoon Creek Partnership was established to deal with environmental and recreational issues pertaining to Raccoon Creek.

== See also ==
- List of rivers of Ohio
- Wheelabout Creek, tributary
