= Cady Run =

Stream in Ohio, United States

Coordinates: 39°28′59″N 81°12′22″W

Cady Run is a stream in the U.S. state of Ohio. It is a tributary to Archers Fork.

Cady Run was named after James Cady, a pioneer settler.
