= Big Creek (Geauga County, Ohio) =

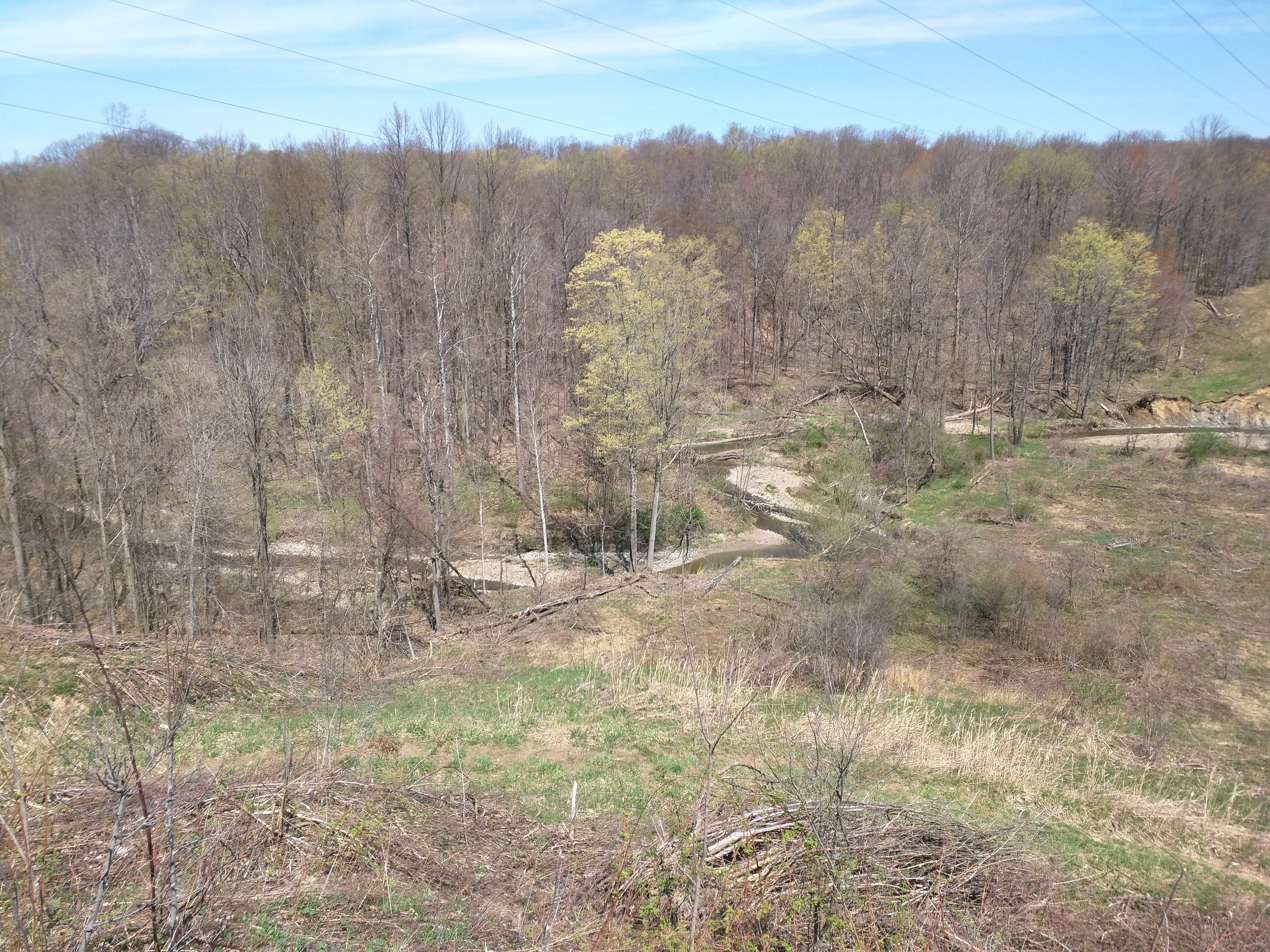
- The upper reaches of Big Creek near Chardon

- Location of the mouth within Ohio

Location
- Country: United States
- State: Ohio

Physical characteristics
- Source
  - location: Chardon
  - coordinates: 41.592159°N 81.189272°W
  - elevation: 1,130 ft (340 m)From USGS Chardon, Ohio topographical map
- Mouth: Grand River
  - coordinates: 41.7072675°N 81.2301013°W
  - elevation: 610 ft (190 m)from USGS ArcGIS web application.
- Length: 15.6 mi (25.1 km)
- Basin size: 50 sq mi (130 km^{2})

Big Creek is a 15.6-mile-long (25.1 km) tributary of the Grand River and flows through Lake and Geauga counties in Ohio. It rises in glacial till near Chardon, Ohio, and cuts through the Defiance Moraine on its way north and exposes rock formations from the Paleozoic Era, including the fossiliferous Chagrin Shale. It joins the Grand River in Painesville Township in Helen Hazen Wyman Park.

With a watershed of 50 square miles (130 km^{2}) its tributaries include Cutts, Jenks, Aylworth, East, Gordon and Kellogg Creeks. It has previously been known as Bigg Creek, and West Creek.

Big Creek flows through a number of parks, and is known for its fishing of smallmouth bass, and steelhead trout that spawn in the creek.

== History ==
Although now an area for recreation including hiking, fishing and camping the Big Creek valley was once a place of industrial activity with saw mills, iron furnaces and a leather tannery. One of the mills was owned by Eber Howe a local newspaper editor and abolitionist, who used the mill as a "station" on the Underground Railroad for slaves who were escaping to Canada by crossing Lake Erie at Painesville. As the route allowed the slaves to reach liberty, the mill became known as Liberty Hollow.

Pease Hollow (now at the corner of Cascade Road and Girdled Road) was the site of a mill that was built by David Pease and used to power lathes and tools for turning wood to make furniture & small wares. Griswold Hollow (now Clark Road from Robinson Road to the Concord Township Line) was the site of a small sandstone quarry (along Jenks Creek) that was noted in a Geological Survey of the area in 1912.

== Flora and Fauna ==
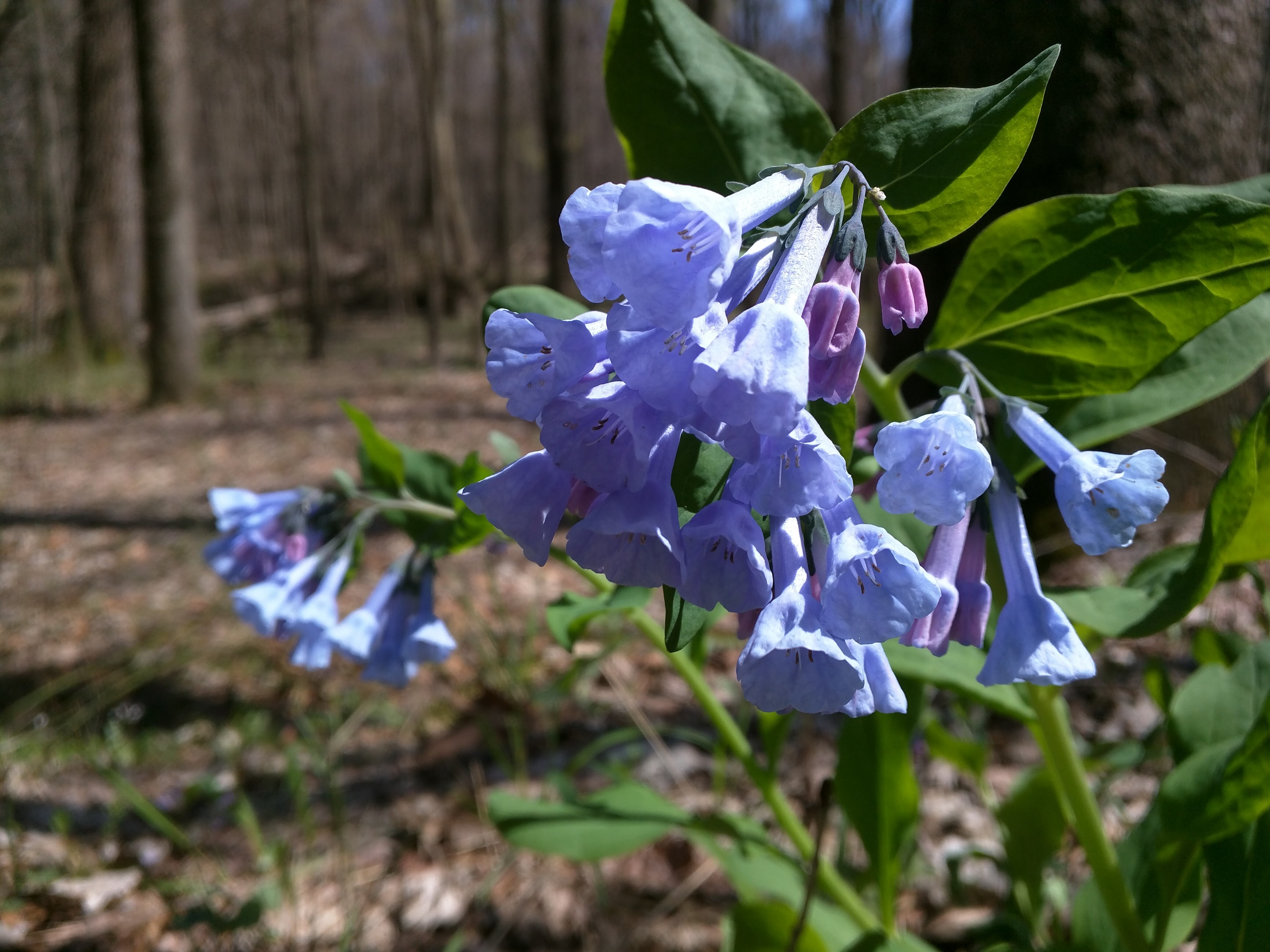
Bluebells Near the Banks of Big Creek

Big Creek traverses three nearly contiguous forested parks. The terrain is undulating and dissected by many small tributary streams with steep banks. In some places, the creek cuts through 40 to 50 feet of till and provides scenic overlooks. The wetter lowland areas near the creek are home to sycamore and cottonwood trees while the better drained hilltops are generally home to a Beech-Maple forest interspersed with patches of predominantly red oak, hemlock, and hickory trees. Wildflowers including trilliums and bluebells are abundant in the spring.

The forests are home to abundant white tailed deer and turkeys. Red, gray, black, flying, and fox squirrels, racoons, possum, foxes and coyotes are also frequently seen. Black bears have been reported in nearby areas. Kingfishers and wood ducks can be spotted along the creek, and swallows make nests in the banks that overlook open areas. Numerous types of woodpeckers can be spotted or heard in the forest, including pileated, red bellied, hairy, and downy.

== See also ==
- List of rivers of Ohio
