= Hopsons Creek =

Stream in Ohio, United States of America

Coordinates: 41°27′46″N 81°09′57″W

Hopsons Creek is a stream located entirely within Geauga County, Ohio.

Hopsons Creek was named for Samuel Hopson, an early settler.

== See also ==
- List of rivers of Ohio
