= Leatherwood Creek (Tawana Creek tributary) =

Stream in Ohio, U.S.

Coordinates: 40°15′56″N 84°05′18″W

Leatherwood Creek is a stream in the U.S. state of Ohio. The 10.6-mile (17.1 km) long stream is a tributary of Tawana Creek.

Leatherwood Creek was named for the leatherwood which grew along its course.

== See also ==
- List of rivers of Ohio
