= Pigeon Creek, Ohio =

- CDP
- Location in Summit County and the state of Ohio.
- Coordinates: 41°06′36″N 81°40′20″W
- Country: United States
- State: Ohio
- County: Summit

Area
  - Total: 0.90 sq mi (2.32 km^{2})
  - Land: 0.90 sq mi (2.32 km^{2})
  - Water: 0 sq mi (0.00 km^{2})
- Elevation: 1,037 ft (316 m)

Population (2020)
  - Total: 886
  - Density: 990.3/sq mi (382.34/km^{2})
- Time zone: UTC-5 (Eastern (EST))
  - Summer (DST): UTC-4 (EDT)
- FIPS code: 39-62578
- GNIS feature ID: 2393184

Pigeon Creek is a census-designated place (CDP) in Summit County, Ohio, United States. The population was 886 at the 2020 census. It is part of the Akron metropolitan statistical area.

== Geography ==
According to the United States Census Bureau, the CDP has a total area of 0.9 square miles (2.3 km^{2}), all land.

Pigeon Creek is also the name of a stream that receives water from Schocalog Run and flows into Wolf Creek, a tributary of Tuscarawas river.

== Demographics ==
Historical population
Census	Pop.	Note	%±
1990	1,008		—
2000	945		−6.2%
2010	882		−6.7%
2020	886		0.5%
U.S. Decennial Census

As of the census of 2000, there were 945 people, 322 households, and 285 families residing in the CDP. The population density was 1,058.5 inhabitants per square mile (408.7/km^{2}). There were 326 housing units at an average density of 365.1 per square mile (141.0/km^{2}). The racial makeup of the CDP was 95.77% White, 1.90% African American, 1.80% Asian, and 0.53% from two or more races. Hispanic or Latino of any race was 0.11% of the population.

There were 322 households, out of which 43.5% had children under the age of 18 living with them, 82.6% were married couples living together, 4.3% had a female householder with no husband present, and 11.2% were non-families. 9.0% of all households were made up of individuals, and 2.2% had someone living alone who was 65 years of age or older. The average household size was 2.93 and the average family size was 3.14.

In the CDP the population was spread out, with 29.7% under the age of 18, 4.3% from 18 to 24, 21.8% from 25 to 44, 36.0% from 45 to 64, and 8.1% who were 65 years of age or older. The median age was 42 years. For every 100 females there were 96.5 males. For every 100 females age 18 and over, there were 98.2 males.

The median income for a household in the CDP was $73,750, and the median income for a family was $80,580. Males had a median income of $51,534 versus $35,000 for females. The per capita income for the CDP was $34,771. None of the population or families was below the poverty line.
