= Blanchard River =

River in Ohio, United States

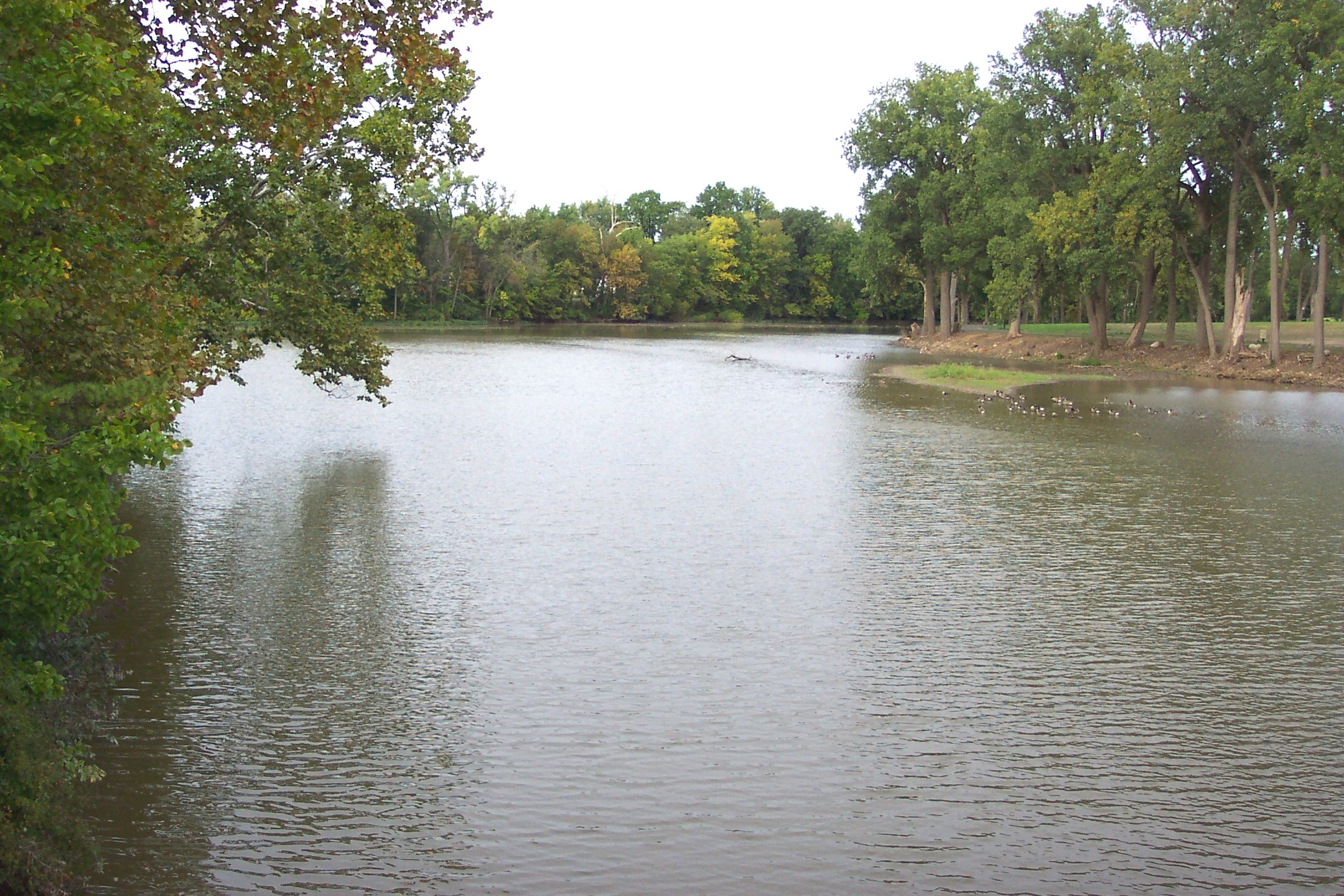
- The Blanchard River in Findlay

Physical characteristics
- Source
  - location: ~ 5 mi (8.0 km) northwest of Kenton
- Mouth
  - location: Auglaize River near Dupont
  - elevation: 686 ft (209 m)
- Length: 103 mi (166 km)
- Basin size: 771 mi^{2} (2,000 km^{2})

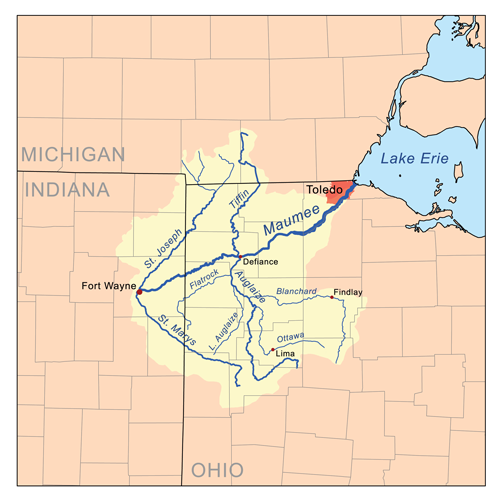
Map of the Maumee River watershed showing the Blanchard River.

The Blanchard River is a 103-mile-long (166 km) tributary of the Auglaize River in northwestern Ohio in the United States. It drains a primarily rural farming area in the watershed of Lake Erie. Much of the length of the river can be navigated by canoe.

It rises in central Hardin County, on the northern outskirts of Kenton. It flows generally north for its first 25 miles (40 km) into eastern Hancock County, where it turns sharply to the west. It flows west through Findlay and past Ottawa. It joins the Auglaize from the east in western Putnam County approximately 2 miles (3 km) north of Cloverdale at 41°02′29″N 84°17′57″W.

== History ==
The river is named for Jean Jacques Blanchard (1720–1802), a French tailor who settled among the Shawnee along the river in 1769. Fort Findlay, an American outpost in the War of 1812, was constructed along the river in 1812 at the site of the present-day city of Findlay.

In 1908, Tell Taylor wrote "Down by the Old Mill Stream", a popular song of the early 20th Century and a barbershop favorite, while sitting on the banks of the Blanchard River.

Around 1939 numerous projects by the Works Progress Administration improved the river near Findlay, including construction of two major bridges, clearing substantial existing pollution, and building a sewage treatment plant to reduce ongoing pollution.

== Flooding ==
In August 2007 flooding along the Blanchard River caused more than $100 million in damage in Findlay and an estimated $12 million in damage in Ottawa. Flooding in Ottawa is aggravated by the low bridge carrying County Road I-9 in Putnam County. It traps debris, forming a dam during floods. Flooding also caused damage in Findlay in March 2011.

On November 28, 2012, officials from Hancock and Putnam counties traveled to Washington D.C. to lobby for $1.7 million in federal funding to complete phase three of the Blanchard River Flood Mitigation study.

== Variant names ==
According to the Geographic Names Information System, the Blanchard River has also been known as:

- Quegh-tua-wa, in Odawa
- Queghtuwa, in Odawa
- Blanchard Fork
- Blanchard's Fork
- Quegh-tu-wa
- Sha-po-qua-te-sepe
- Sha-po-qua-te-sepi
- Tailor's River

== See also ==
- List of rivers of Ohio
