= Harker's Run =

Stream in Ohio, United States

Coordinates: 39°30′29″N 84°43′01″W

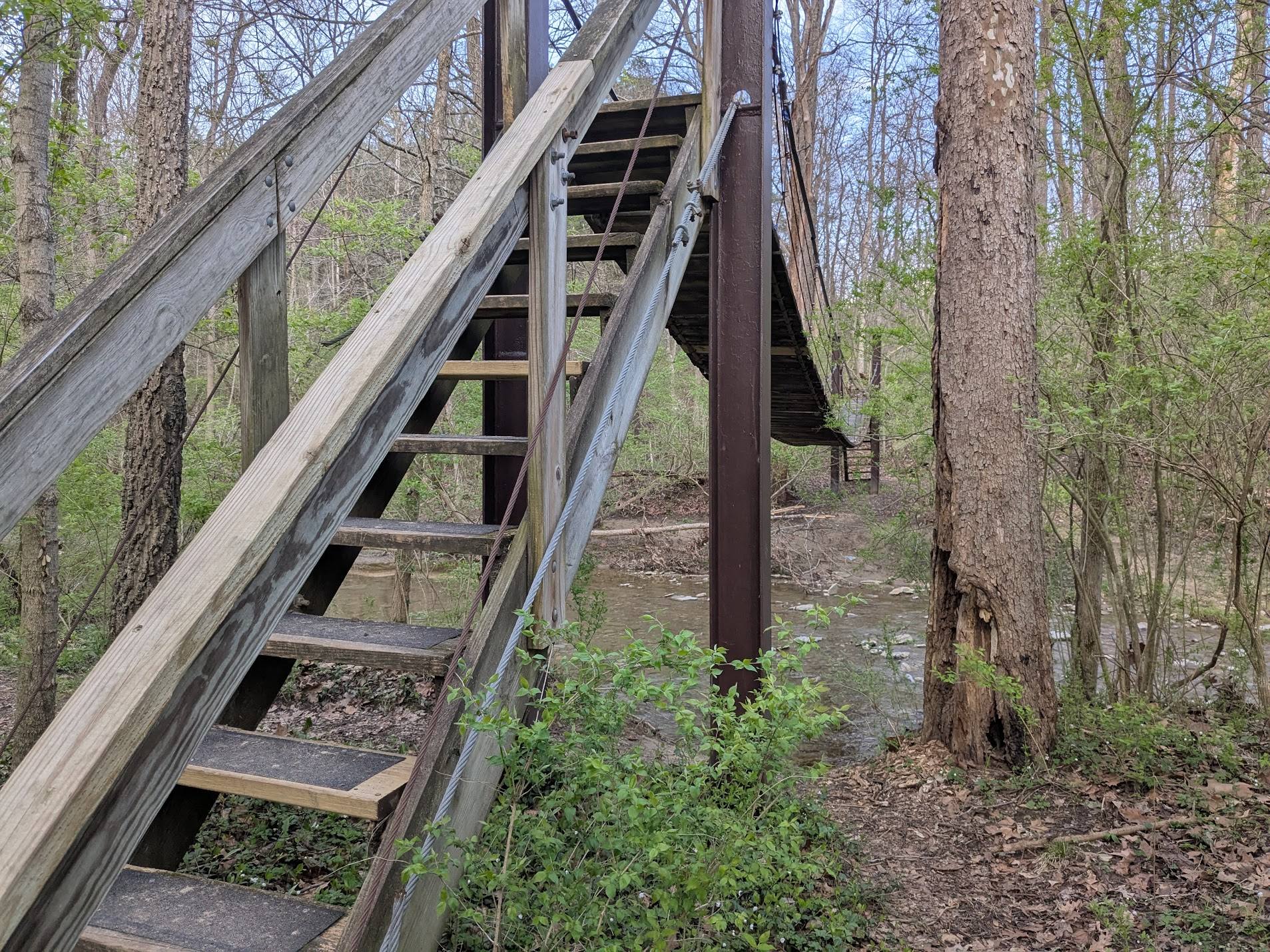
- Rope bridge over Harker's Run in 2025

Location
- Country: United States

Physical characteristics
- Source
  - location: Preble County, Ohio, US
  - elevation: 1,000 feet (305 m)
- Mouth
  - location: Four Mile Creek, Ohio, US
- Length: 4.8 mi (7.7 km)

Harker's Run (or Harkers Run, as shown on federal maps) is a stream originating in Preble County, Ohio. Harker's Run drains into Four Mile Creek on the eastern edge of the campus of Miami University in Oxford just north of where the Trenton Oxford Road crosses Four Mile/Talawanda Creek. The stream flows roughly from north to south, and is approximately 5.5 miles (8.9 km) in total length. The elevation at the mouth of the stream is 775 feet (236 m) above sea level. At its highest point, the stream is at approximately 1,000 feet (305 m) elevation. The stream is crossed by bridges on Bonham Road, Somerville Road, Hamilton Richmond Road, and Oxford Germantown Road.

Much of Harker's Run lies within the Bachelor Wildlife and Game Reserve, owned and managed by Miami University (Oxford Township, Butler County, Ohio). The preserve contains land once owned by Joseph M. Bachelor, a professor of English at the university from 1927 to 1946, which was willed to the university upon his death in 1947. An extensive hiking trail system in the Reserve includes a 45 feet (14 m) long swinging bridge across Harker's Run.

The confluence of this tributary to the larger Four Mile/Talawanda Creek is 0.25 miles (0.40 km) south of the historic Zachariah Price Dewitt Cabin. There is parking on the east side of the Ohio State Route 73 bridge across Four Mile/Talawanda Creek on the north side of the road.

== See also ==
- List of rivers of Ohio
