= Schocalog Run =

Coordinates: 41°05′24″N 81°35′04″W

Schocalog Run is a stream located entirely within Summit County, Ohio. It flows into Pigeon Creek, a tributary of Tuscarawas river.

Schocalog most likely is a Native American word of unknown meaning.

== See also ==
- List of rivers of Ohio
