= Leith Run =

Stream in Ohio, U.S.

Coordinates: 39°26′39″N 81°09′00″W

Leith Run is a stream in the U.S. state of Ohio. It is a tributary to the Ohio River.

Variant names are "Leath's Run", "Leaths Run", "Leiths Run", and "Lieth Run". The stream was named for the Leath family of pioneer settlers, who lived near the stream's mouth.
