= Sawyer Run =

Stream in Ohio, U.S.

Coordinates: 39°15′18″N 81°41′52″W

Sawyer Run is a stream in the U.S. state of Ohio. It is a tributary to the Ohio River.

Sawyer Run was named after Nathaniel Sawyer, the proprietor of a local corn cracker mill. A variant name is "Sawyers Run".
