= Grand River (Ohio) =

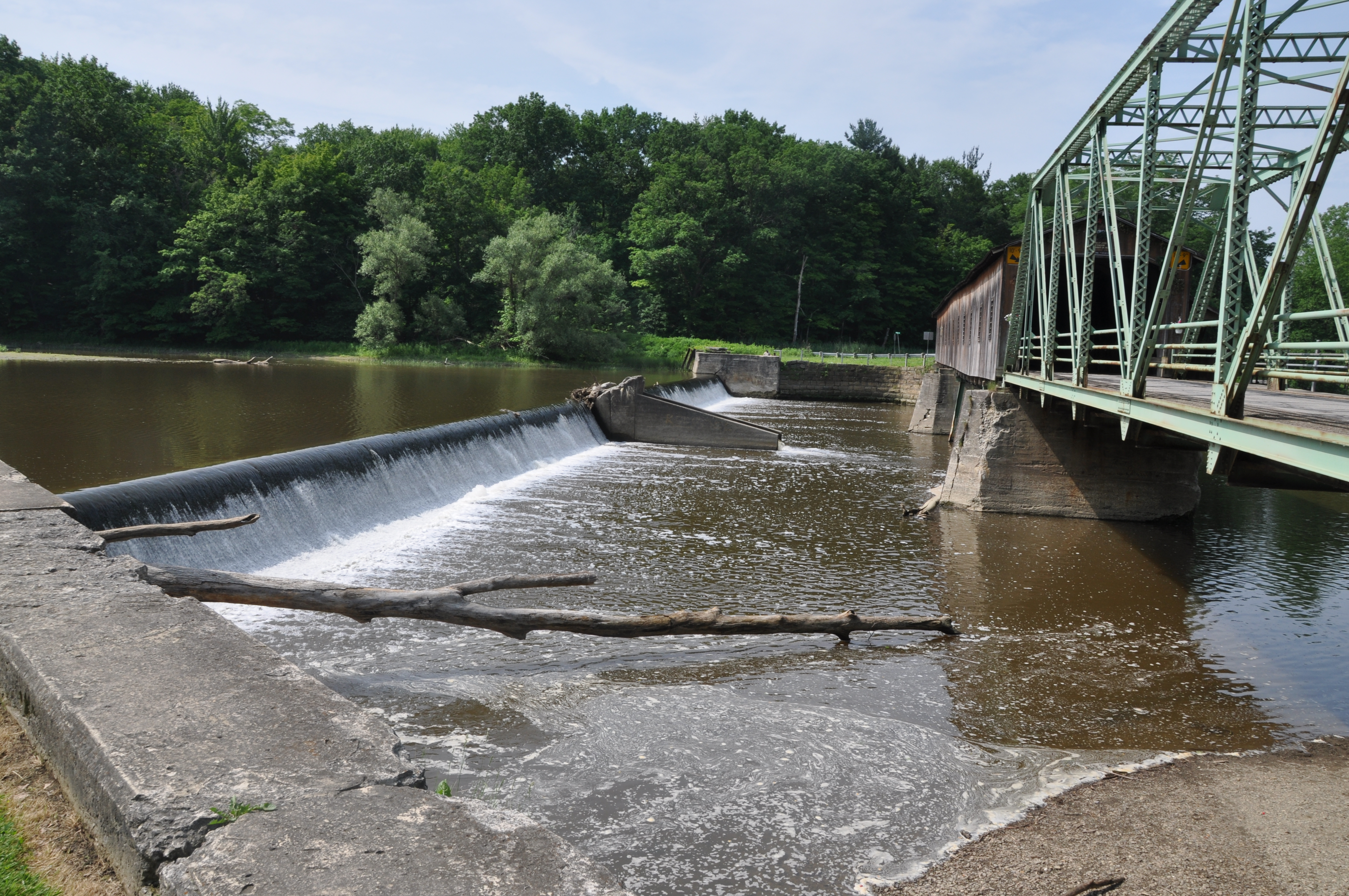
- Harpersfield Covered Bridge over the Grand River

- Location of the mouth within Ohio

Location
- Country: United States
- State: Ohio
- Counties: Geauga, Trumbull, Ashtabula, Lake

Physical characteristics
- Source
  - location: Geauga County
  - coordinates: 41.4139435°N 81.0778745°W
- Mouth: Lake Erie
  - location: Fairport Harbor
  - coordinates: 41.7603208°N 81.2806588°W
- Length: 102.7 mi (165.3 km)
- Basin size: 712 sq mi (1,840 km^{2})

Basin features
- USGS Cataloging Unit: 04110004

The Grand River is a tributary of Lake Erie, 102.7 miles (165.3 km) long, in northeastern Ohio in the United States. Via Lake Erie, the Niagara River and Lake Ontario, it is part of the watershed of the St. Lawrence River, which flows to the Atlantic Ocean. It drains an area of 712 mi² (1844 km²).

The Grand River begins in southeastern Geauga County and initially flows eastward into Trumbull County. Downstream of West Farmington it turns northward into Ashtabula County, where it flows through the village of Rock Creek and then turns westward into Lake County, where it flows through the communities of Painesville and Grand River before flowing into Lake Erie in Fairport Harbor.

== Watershed description ==
On January 17, 1974, the Grand River was designated Ohio's second wild and scenic river by the Ohio Department of Natural Resources. Designated sections include: from Harpersfield covered bridge downstream to the Norfolk and Western Railway trestle south of Painesville (wild, 23 miles (37 km) and from the US 322 in Ashtabula County downstream to Harpersfield covered bridge (scenic, 33 miles (53 km)). The Grand Wild and Scenic River represents one of the finest examples of a natural stream to be found anywhere in Ohio. Due to its rugged topography, the Grand River has not until recently felt the influences of urbanization.

During the Pleistocene or Ice Age, the Wisconsinan glacier spread over Ohio in lobes, one of which is known as the Grand River lobe. This lobe ground and scraped its way south across northeastern Ohio, but was halted by the steep, erosion-resistant sandstone hills found to the south.

The upper portion of the Grand River in Ashtabula County is designated scenic. The river is bordered in many areas by extensive swamp forests of elm, ash, maple, pine, pin oak and swamp white oak. The slow flow of this section of the river along with the adjoining wetlands provides excellent habitat for a number of wildlife species, especially river otters, which have made a strong comeback after their reintroduction by the Division of Wildlife in 1986 and 1988. The lower section of the Grand River in Lake County is designated wild. Here, the river is characterized by steeply-incised valley walls of Chagrin Shale. A view of the river in this area following spring and summer showers has many waterfalls cascading over the steep shale bluffs. Insuring the natural heritage of the Grand River is not limited to protecting the immediate streamside environment. Land use activities within the watershed; such as urban and residential development may have a direct and adverse effect on the long-term protection and preservation of this important Ohio water resource. The Grand River has the most aquatic diversity of any Ohio Lake Erie tributary. The Grand River has an active partnership group working with the state scenic rivers program and other agencies to assist with the rivers preservation.

== 2006 flood ==
On July 28, 2006, the Grand River overflowed its banks and caused a state of emergency in Lake County and Ashtabula County due to flooding. The river reached 11 feet above flood level, a 500-year flood, due to a 1,000-year 48-hour rain. The flooding was so powerful that it caused a tributary (Paine Creek) to change course in at least one location. The area was subsequently declared a Federal Disaster area.

== History ==
The first settlers of the Western Reserve landed at Fairport Harbor before they began the overland portion of their journey South to settlements such as Burton.

The area once boasted several Native American sites, including a mysterious Mound enclosure at what is now Fairport Harbor and several rock pile mounds in Northwestern Trumbull county, within a swampland that is now mostly part of the Grand River Wildlife Preserve (not to be confused with the Conservation Area). We now know the rock piles are likely Algonquian built and were known as Spirit Stones, though Iroquoians may have made them too. They may have been placed by the Ottawa, the Whittlesey or an other, older forgotten culture and were shrines for spirits worshipped in the area. The Mound enclosure may have been a Hopewell addition that served to enclose a sacred place of worship. An Erie village has been archaeologically documented on private land in Windsor, directly off of one of the river's tributaries and a now completely removed burial ground was found in Parkman, again, off of one of the river's tributaries.

== Variant names ==
According to the Geographic Names Information System, the Grand River has also been known historically as:

- Grande Riviere
- Chereage River
- Chocago River
- Chogage River
- Geauga River
- Geaugah River
- Riviere Charage
- Sheauga River

== Tributaries ==
The principal tributaries by length are Mill Creek 28.8 miles (46.3 km), Rock Creek 18.4 miles (29.6 km), and Big Creek 15.6 miles (25.1 km).

=== East Shore ===
- Red Creek
- Coffee Creek (Austinburg)
- Mill Creek (Austinburg)
- Three Brothers Creek
- Rock Creek
- Baughman Creek
- Deacon Creek
- Center Creek
- Mud Run
- Dead Branch

=== West Shore ===
- Big Creek
- Kellogg Creek
- Paine Creek
- Talcott Creek
- Griswold Creek
- Mill Creek (Madison)
- Bronson Creek
- Trumbull Creek
- Mud Creek
- Hoskins Creek
- Phelps Creek
- Mill Creek (Mesopotamia)
- Swine Creek
- Coffee Creek (Mesopotamia)

== See also ==
- List of rivers of Ohio
- Grand River Valley AVA
- Interstate 90 Grand River bridges
