= Wheelabout Creek =

Stream in Ohio, U.S.

Coordinates: 39°16′23″N 82°23′23″W

Wheelabout Creek is a stream in the U.S. state of Ohio.

Wheelabout Creek is noted for its irregular course.

== See also ==
- List of rivers of Ohio
