= Clear Creek (Hocking River tributary) =

Creek in Ohio, United States

Coordinates: 39°35′49″N 82°32′46″W

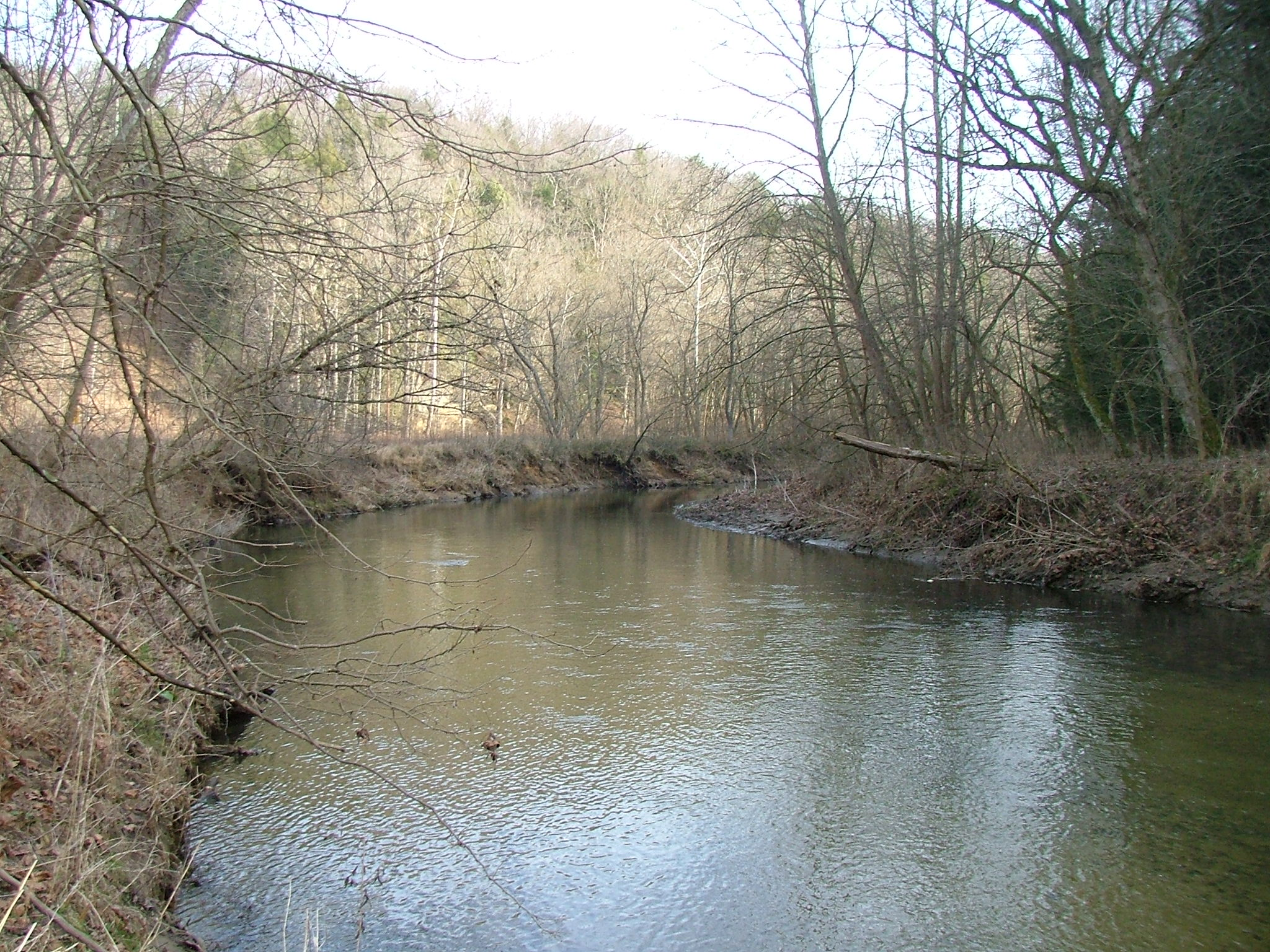
- Clear Creek in the Clear Creek Metro Park

Physical characteristics
- Source
  - location: Near Royalton, Ohio
  - elevation: ~ 1,000 ft (305 m)
- Mouth
  - location: Hocking River near Rockbridge, Ohio
  - elevation: 758 ft (231 m)
- Basin size: 89 mi^{2} (230 km^{2})

Clear Creek is a tributary of the Hocking River. It starts in western Fairfield County and flows southwest into northern Hocking County. In the upper half of the creek's watershed was glaciated and currently has a large amount of agricultural land use. The lower half is part of the unglaciated Allegheny Plateau and is much more forested. The creek's mouth is found at

== Variant names ==
According to the Geographic Names Information System, the Clear Creek has also been known as Clear Fork.

== See also ==
- List of rivers of Ohio
