= Ottawa River (Auglaize River tributary) =

River in Ohio, United States

Coordinates: 40.9951°N 84.2413°W

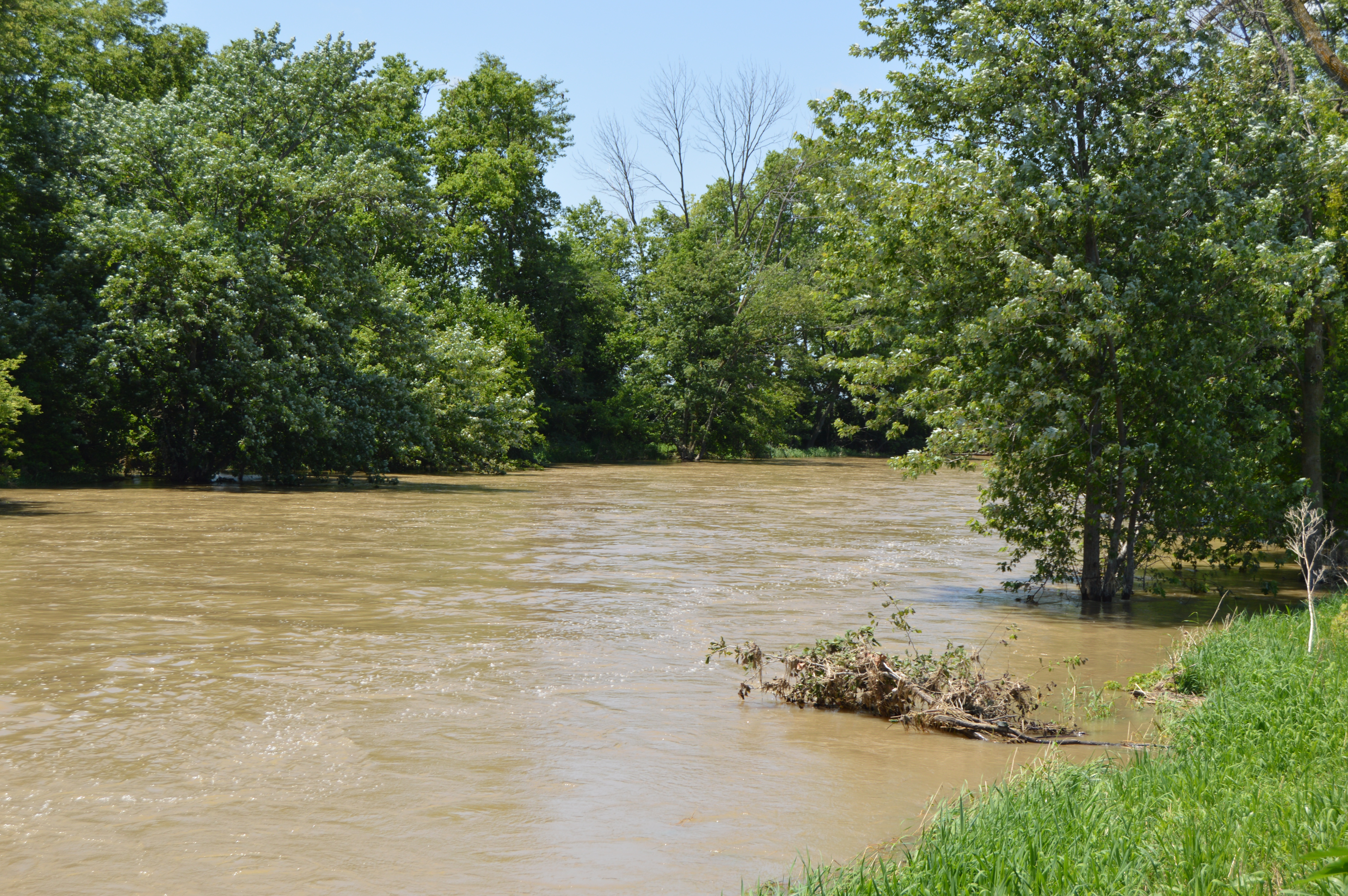
Looking downstream at Rimer following extensive rain

The Ottawa River (Shawnee: Koskothiipi) is a tributary of the Auglaize River, approximately 50 miles (80 km) long, in northwestern Ohio in the United States. The river is named for the Odawa tribe of Native Americans who inhabited the area in the 18th century. It shares its name with another river in northwestern Ohio, the Ottawa River in Toledo, as well as the Ottawa River in Ontario & Quebec, Canada.

It rises in northern Hardin County and flows northwest, then west-southwest through Lima. Approximately 2 miles (3 km) southeast of Lima it turns abruptly north, flowing into western Putnam County and joining the Auglaize from the southeast approximately 3 miles (5 km) northwest of Kalida.

The Ottawa River is also known locally and historically as "Hog Creek". The origin of this name is ascribed to the following legend:

Alexander McKee, the British Indian Agent, who resided at the Machachac towns, on Mad River, during the incursion of General Logan from Kentucky in 1786, was obliged to flee with his effects. He had a large lot of swine, which were driven on to the borders of this stream, and when the Indians (Shawnee) came on they called the river Koshko Sepe, which in the Shawnee language signified 'The Creek of the Hogs, or Hog Stream'.

== See also ==
- List of rivers of Ohio
