= Auglaize Township, Laclede County, Missouri =

Township in Laclede County, Missouri, U.S.

Coordinates: 37.7944°N 92.6442°W

Auglaize Township is an inactive township in Laclede County, in the U.S. state of Missouri.

Auglaize Township was established in 1874, taking its name from the Dry Auglaize River.
