= Reas Run =

Stream in Ohio, U.S.

Coordinates: 39°26′21″N 81°10′18″W

Reas Run is a stream in the U.S. state of Ohio. It is a tributary to the Ohio River.

A variant name is "Rea's Run". Reas Run was named after William Rea, a pioneer settler.
