= Auglaize Township, Camden County, Missouri =

Auglaize Township
- Township
- Coordinates: 37°56′09″N 092°33′21″W
- Country: United States
- State: Missouri
- County: Camden

Area
  - Total: 122.69 sq mi (317.76 km^{2})
  - Land: 122.58 sq mi (317.47 km^{2})
  - Water: 0.11 sq mi (0.29 km^{2}) 0.09%
- Elevation: 958 ft (292 m)

Population (2000)
  - Total: 2,227
  - Density: 18/sq mi (7/km^{2})
- FIPS code: 29-02476
- GNIS feature ID: 0766389

Auglaize Township is one of eleven townships in Camden County, Missouri, USA. As of the 2000 census, its population was 2,227.

Auglaize Township was established in 1841.

== Geography ==
Auglaize Township covers an area of 122.69 square miles (317.8 km^{2}) and contains one incorporated settlement, Stoutland. It contains ten cemeteries: Brown, Campground, Chalfant, Dodson, Hammer, Hillhouse, Knight, Lewis, Sharp and Traw.

The streams of Conns Creek, Mill Creek, Murphy Creek, Sellars Creek, Shakerag Creek, Stoops Branch, Stoutland Creek and Stoutland Creek run through this township.
