= Auglaize River =

River in Ohio, United States

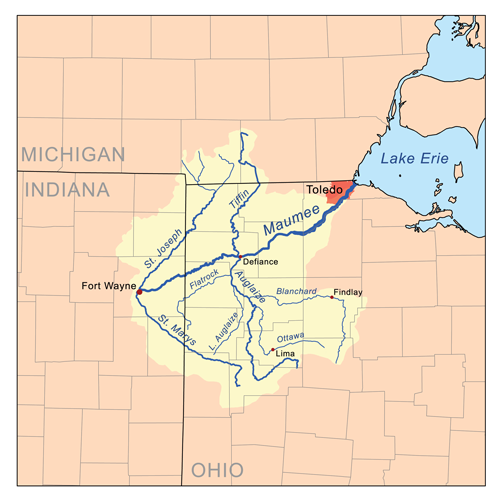
- Map of the Maumee River watershed showing the Auglaize River

Physical characteristics
- Source
  - location: 2 mi (3.2 km) south of Harrod
  - elevation: ≈990 ft (300 m)
- Mouth
  - location: Maumee River at Defiance
  - elevation: ≈665 ft (203 m)
- Length: 113 mi (182 km)
- Basin size: 2,337 mi^{2} (6,050 km^{2})

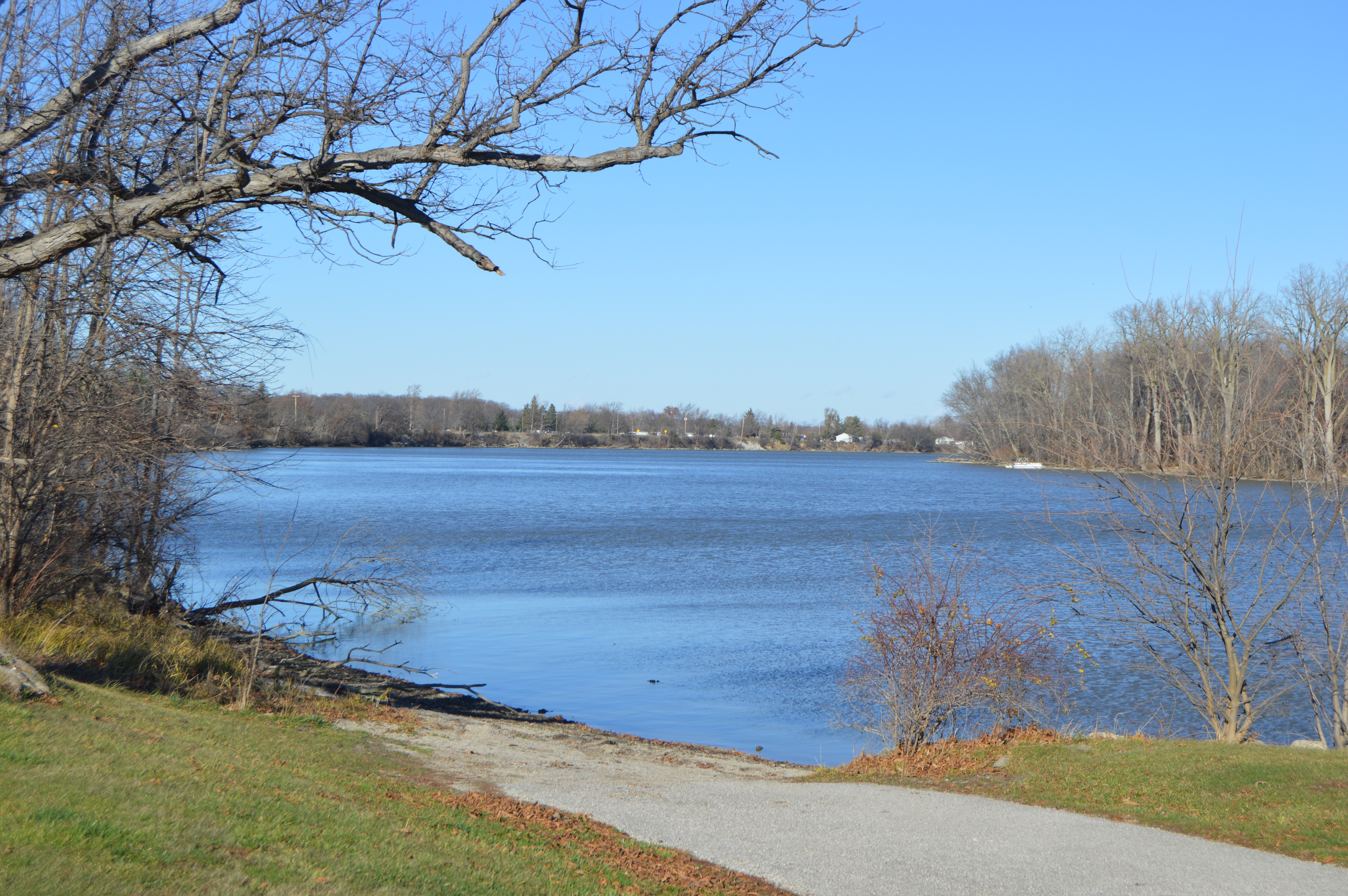
Along the Auglaize near Junction

The Auglaize River (Shawnee: Kathinakithiipi) is a 113-mile-long (182 km) tributary of the Maumee River in northwestern Ohio in the United States. It drains a primarily rural farming area in the watershed of Lake Erie. The name of the river was derived from the French term for it. The French called it "rivière à la Grande Glaize" (later spelled as "glaise", meaning river of Great Clay), referring to the soil in the area.

== Description ==
The Auglaize River rises in southeastern Allen County, approximately 10 miles (16 km) southeast of Lima and 12 miles (19 km) north of Indian Lake. It flows southwest to Wapakoneta, then generally north in a zigzag course, past Delphos, Fort Jennings and Oakwood. It joins the Maumee from the south at Defiance, approximately 2 miles (3 km) east of the mouth of the Tiffin River at 41°17′13″N 84°21′23″W.

It receives the Ottawa River from the southeast in western Putnam County, northwest of Lima. It also receives the Blanchard River in western Putnam County. It receives the Little Auglaize River from the south in eastern Paulding County. It receives Flatrock Creek from the west in northeastern Paulding County.

A portage from the headwaters of the Great Miami River to the south bend of the Auglaize made it part of an important link between the watershed of the Ohio (and the Mississippi) and Lake Erie and the St. Lawrence watershed, heavily settled in pre-Columbian times.

During the days of the Ohio Country in the 18th century, the area around the river was inhabited by the Ottawa. During the mid-1790s, the area near the mouth of the Auglaize surpassed Kekionga to the west as the center of Indian influence. Fort Defiance was constructed in 1794 near the confluence of the Auglaize and the Maumee by General Mad Anthony Wayne. Fort Amanda, constructed along the river southwest of Lima in 1812, was an important American outpost during the War of 1812.

== Variant names ==
According to the Geographic Names Information System, the Auglaize River has also had the following names:

- Au Glaize River
- Auglaise River
- Cowthenake sepe
- Glaize River
- Grand Au Glaze River
- Grand Glaise River
- Grand Glaize River
- Great au Glaise River
- Qusquasrundee

== See also ==
- List of rivers of Ohio
- Grandglaize Creek, a tributary of the Lake of the Ozarks, which also uses the Auglaize name
