= Knox Township, Columbiana County, Ohio =

Township in Ohio, US

- Township
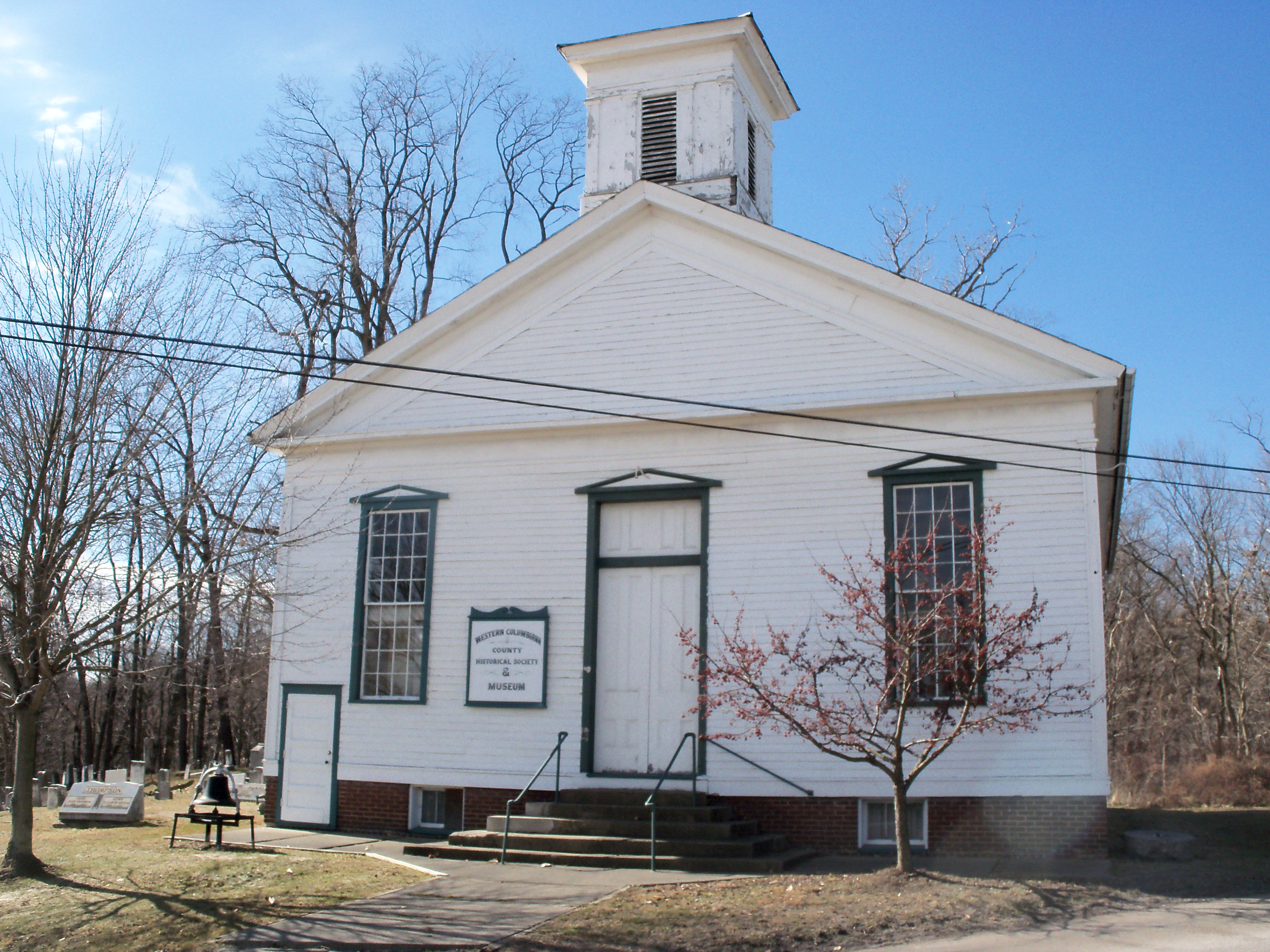
- The former Middle Sandy Presbyterian Church

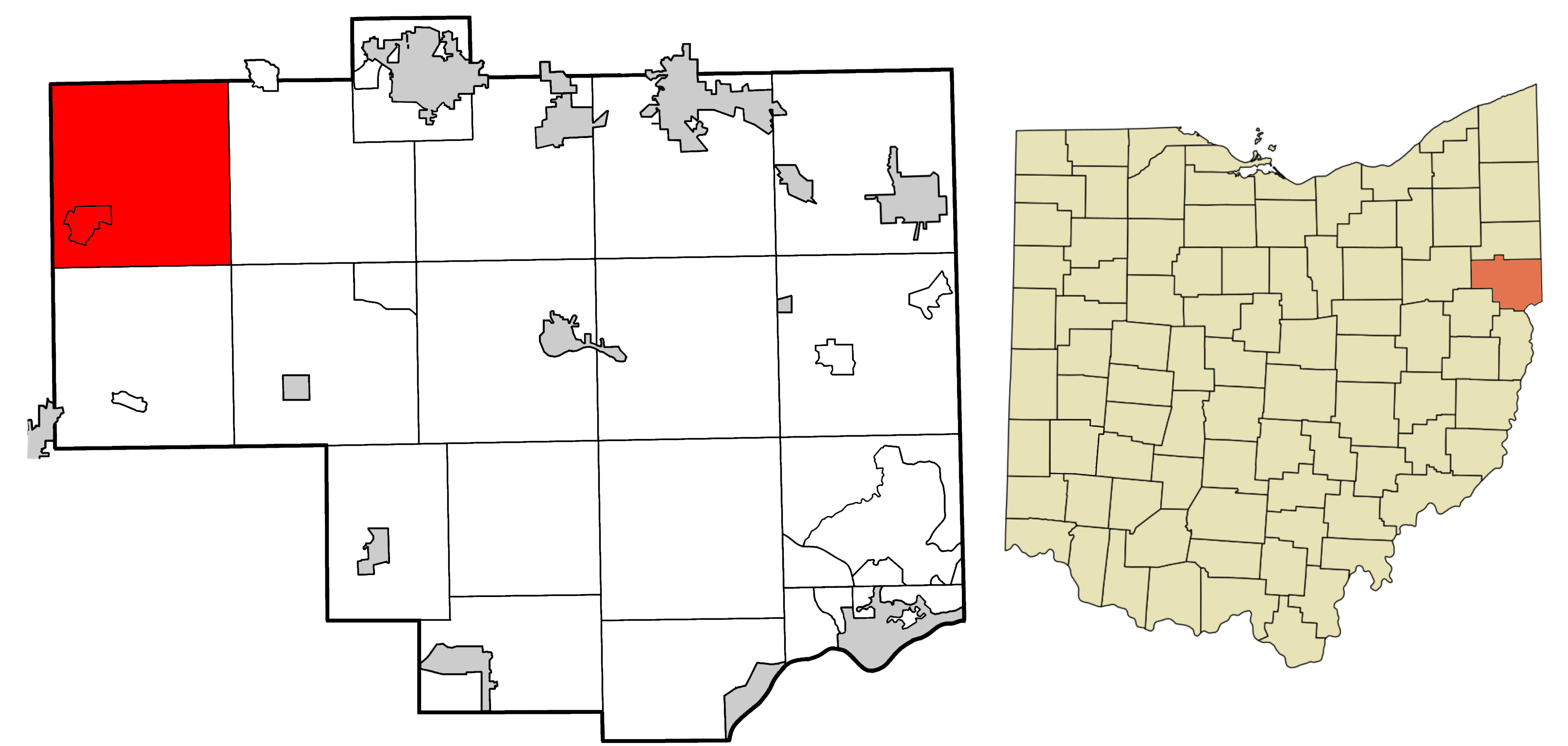
- Location of Knox Township in Columbiana County
- Coordinates: 40°51′7″N 81°1′55″W
- Country: United States
- State: Ohio
- County: Columbiana

Government
  - Type: Board of Trustees
  - Chairman: Sara Crawford

Area
  - Total: 35.5 sq mi (92.0 km^{2})
  - Land: 35.3 sq mi (91.5 km^{2})
  - Water: 0.19 sq mi (0.5 km^{2})
- Elevation: 1,122 ft (342 m)

Population (2020)
  - Total: 4,068
  - Density: 115/sq mi (44.5/km^{2})
- Time zone: UTC-5 (Eastern (EST))
  - Summer (DST): UTC-4 (EDT)
- FIPS code: 39-40824
- GNIS feature ID: 1085896
- Website: knoxtownship.org

Knox Township is one of the eighteen townships of Columbiana County, Ohio, United States. As of the 2020 census it had a population of 4,068.

== Geography ==
Located in the northwestern corner of the county, it borders the following townships and city:

- Smith Township, Mahoning County - north
- Goshen Township, Mahoning County - northeast corner
- Butler Township - east
- Hanover Township - southeast corner
- West Township - south
- Paris Township, Stark County - southwest corner
- Washington Township, Stark County - west
- Alliance - northwest

Two unincorporated communities are located in Knox Township:

- The census-designated place of Homeworth, in the southwest
- The unincorporated community of North Georgetown, in the west

== Name and history ==
Historical population
Census	Pop.	Note	%±
1980	4,486		—
1990	4,449		−0.8%
2000	4,828		8.5%
2010	4,434		−8.2%
2020	4,068		−8.3%

It is one of five Knox Townships statewide. The township was organized in 1808.

== Government ==
The township is governed by a three-member board of trustees, who are elected in November of odd-numbered years to a four-year term beginning on the following January 1. Two are elected in the year after the presidential election and one is elected in the year before it. There is also an elected township fiscal officer, who serves a four-year term beginning on April 1 of the year after the election, which is held in November of the year before the presidential election. Vacancies in the fiscal officership or on the board of trustees are filled by the remaining trustees.

=== Township Trustees ===
- Matthew Johnson, Chairman
- Gregory R. Carver, Vice Chairman
- John Eddie Barnhart

=== Fiscal Officer ===
- Debra S. Hartzell
