= Salem Heights, Columbiana County, Ohio =

Salem Heights, Ohio
- Census-designated place
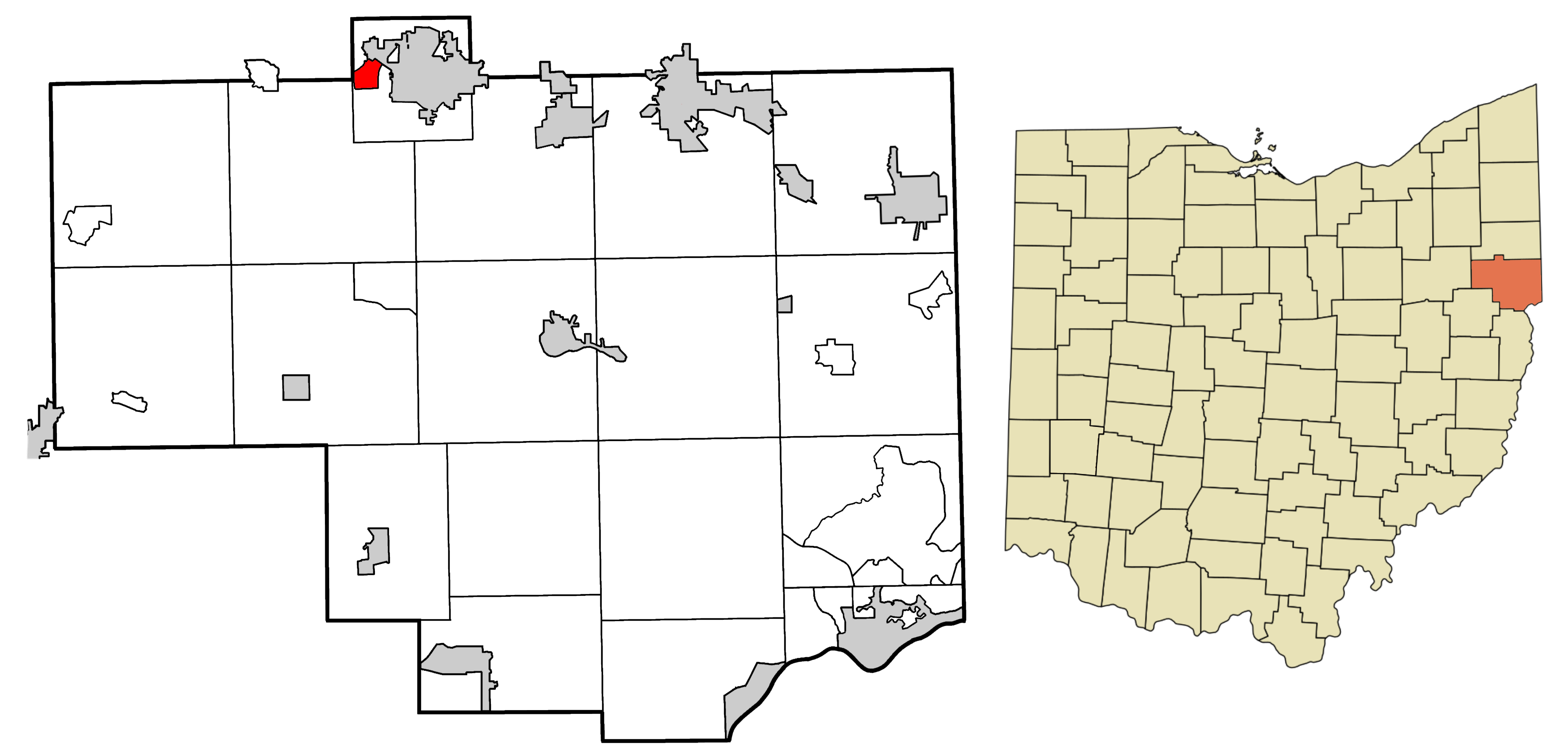
- Location of Salem Heights in Columbiana County, Ohio.

- Location within Ohio Location within the United States
- Coordinates: 40°54′11″N 80°53′14″W
- Country: United States
- State: Ohio
- County: Columbiana
- Township: Perry

Area
  - Total: 0.68 sq mi (1.75 km^{2})
  - Land: 0.67 sq mi (1.73 km^{2})
  - Water: 0.0077 sq mi (0.02 km^{2})
- Elevation: 1,260 ft (380 m)

Population (2020)
  - Total: 336
- Time zone: UTC-5 (Eastern (EST))
  - Summer (DST): UTC-4 (EDT)
- ZIP Code: 44460 (Salem)
- Area codes: 330/234
- FIPS code: 39-12814
- GNIS feature ID: 2812814

Salem Heights is an unincorporated community and census-designated place (CDP) in Columbiana County, Ohio, United States. It was first listed as a CDP prior to the 2020 census, in which its population was 336. Salem Heights sits on the 1,275-foot (389 m) Blackburn Hill, separated from the city of Salem by the valley of the Middle Fork of the Little Beaver Creek. It is part of the Salem micropolitan area.

== Geography ==
The CDP is in northern Columbiana County, on the western edge of Perry Township, which primarily contains the city of Salem. Salem Heights is bordered to the west by Goshen Township in Mahoning County and by Butler Township in Columbiana County. To the east it is bordered by Ohio State Route 45, a western bypass of Salem. U.S. Route 62 runs through the center of Salem Heights on West State Street, then turns north to join the Route 45 bypass. Ohio State Route 14 (Benton Road) passes through the northern part of Salem Heights, leading southeast into Salem and northwest 26 miles (42 km) to Ravenna. US-62 leads northeast 21 miles (34 km) to Youngstown and west 12 miles (19 km) to Alliance. State Route 45 leads southeast 11 miles (18 km) to Lisbon.
