= Franklin Harris Farmstead =

- U.S. National Register of Historic Places
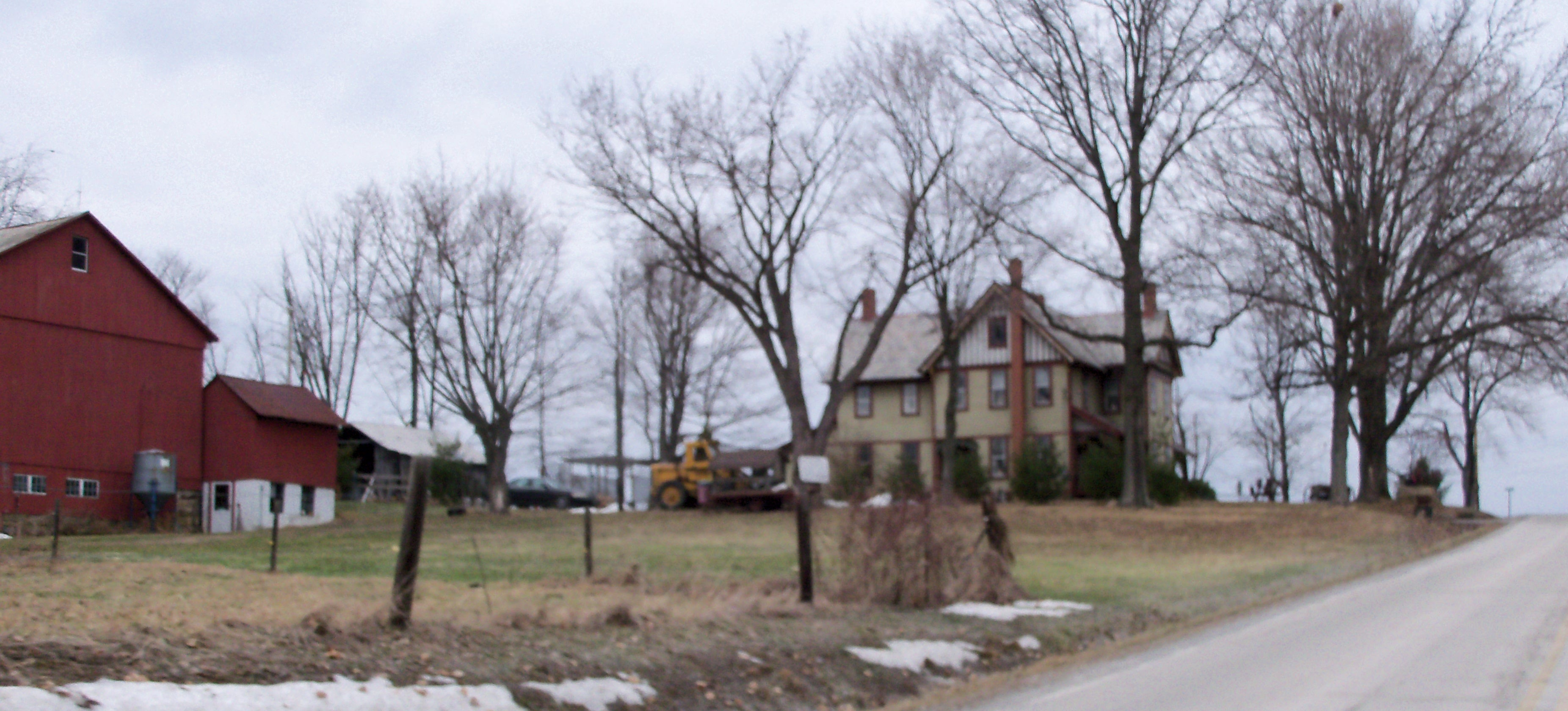
- Roadside view

- Location within Ohio Location within the United States
- Location: 3525 Depot Road, south of Salem, Ohio
- Coordinates: 40°50′57″N 80°51′29″W
- Area: 4 acres (1.6 ha)
- Built: 1894
- Architect: Albert Cameron
- Architectural style: Queen Anne and Stick-Eastlake
- NRHP reference No.: 97001462
- Added to NRHP: November 24, 1997

The Franklin Harris Farmstead is a historic farm complex located outside the village of Salem in Columbiana County, Ohio, United States. Once home to a prominent former soldier, the farmstead includes a high-style farmhouse from the 1890s, and it has been named a historic site.

Growing up a Quaker, Franklin Harris lived in Butler Township from the cradle. At age 22, two months after the outbreak of the Civil War, he enlisted in military service; after service in the 104th OVI, he served in the carpenter corps until being discharged in 1863. Returning home, he worked in Salem and rented a farm before buying the present property. He and his wife Priscilla were responsible for the construction of the present farmstead, which they operated as a dairy farm.

Built in 1894, the farmhouse mixes elements of the Queen Anne and Stick-Eastlake styles. Set on a foundation of sandstone, the wooden house is covered with a slate roof. One of the house's small porches shelters the main entrance, which is placed in the area sheltered between the ell and the house's main section. Both the main section and the ell are two and a half stories in height and rise to intersecting gables. Fenestration is generally regular, although only a single window overlooks the entrance porch, and the front end of the main section of the house includes two irregularly placed windows.

In 1997, the Harris Farmstead was listed on the National Register of Historic Places, qualifying because of its historically significant architecture. The designation embraces five buildings across an area of 4 acres (1.6 ha), including the agricultural outbuildings.
