= Salem Heights, Ohio =

Salem Heights is the name of several places in the U.S. state of Ohio, including:

- Salem Heights, Columbiana County, Ohio
- Salem Heights, Hamilton County, Ohio
