= Athens Female College =

Athens Female College was the name of two separate American women's colleges, both now coed and since renamed:

- 1857–1866 in Athens, Tennessee: now Tennessee Wesleyan College
- 1889–1931 in Athens, Alabama: now Athens State University

== See also ==
- Athens College (disambiguation)
