= Mary Jo Freshley =

American dancer and academic (born 1934)

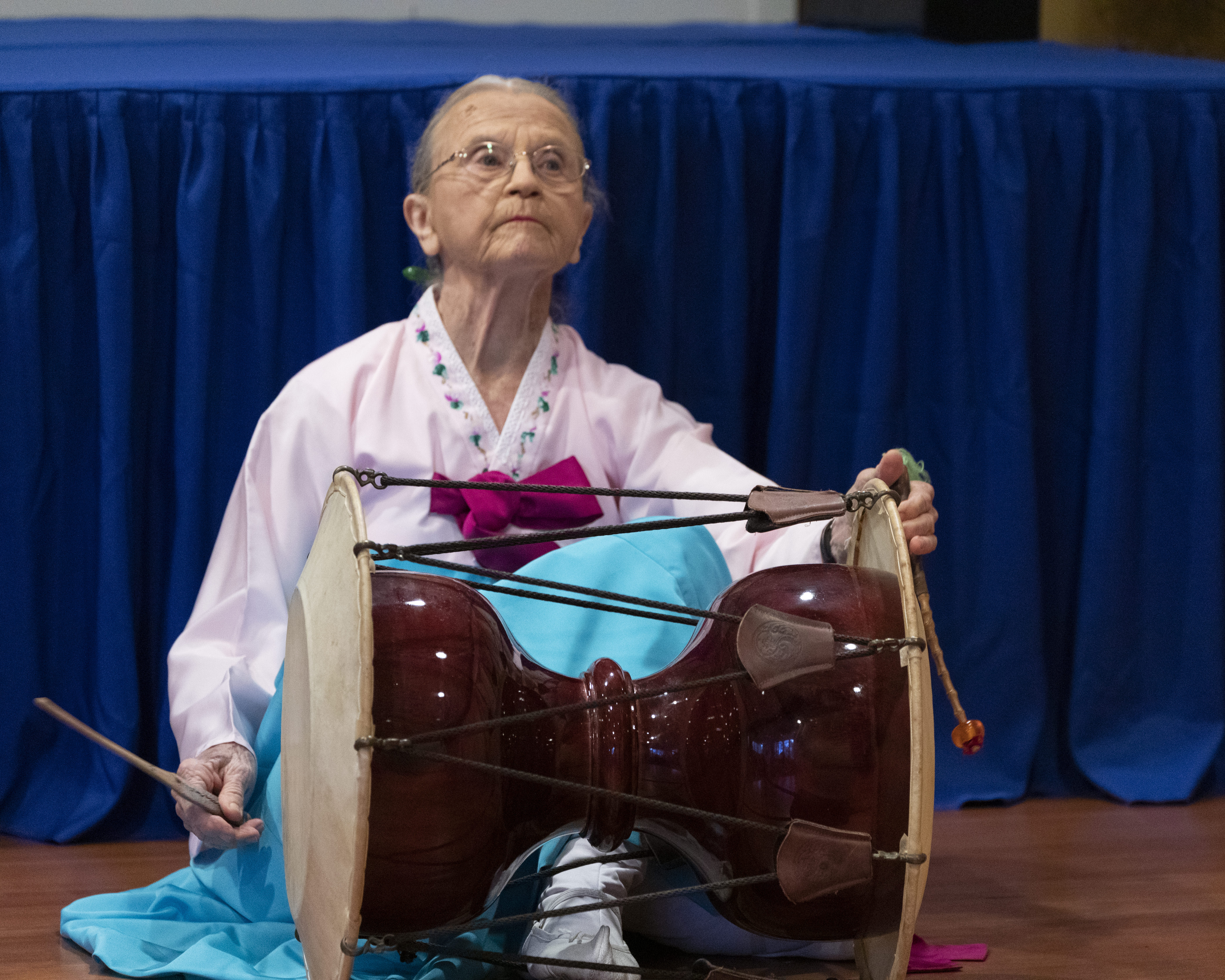
- Born: September 25, 1934 (age 91); Homeworth, Ohio
- Education: Bowling Green State University

Mary Jo Freshley (born September 25, 1934) is an American instructor of Korean dance. She teaches at the University of Hawaiʻi at Mānoa and the Halla Pai Huhm Dance Studio. Freshley is one of the Honpa Hongwanji Mission of Hawaii's Living Treasures of Hawaii. Even though she is not ethnically Korean, she is one of Hawaii's foremost experts on Korean dance.

== Early life ==
Freshley was born on September 25, 1934, in Homeworth, Ohio. She earned an undergraduate degree from Bowling Green State University in 1956, and a master's degree in education after that. She taught physical education in Michigan, and once she moved to Hawaii she also taught at Kamehameha Schools.

== Dance ==
After moving to Hawaii in 1961, Freshley began learning the dances of many cultures, such as Hawaiian, Okinawan, Filipino dance, and Japanese. Freshley began studying Korean dance under Halla Pai Huhm in 1962. She began assisting at the Halla Pai Huhm Dance Studio in 1973. Freshley has also studied with Kim Pyong-Sop and Kim Chon-Hung.

Freshley took over the studio after Huhm's death in 1994. In the same year, she retired from her teaching position at Kamehameha Schools, started teaching at the studio full-time, and founded the Halla Huhm Foundation. Much like Halla Huhm, she did not receive a salary from the dance studio, and used funding surpluses to bring guest instructors from Korea. However, Freshley's ethnic heritage as a European-American led to some criticism from the local Korean community, who believe that a Korean should have taken over Huhm's work and studio. She was also excluded from the studio's performance at the 1989 Smithsonian Folklife Festival because of her race.

She is still active as the director and master teacher of Halla Huhm Korean Dance Studio. Freshley also teaches at the University of Hawaiʻi at Mānoa.

In 2018 she was honored as a Living Treasure of Hawaii for her work in preserving Korean culture in Hawaii and for creating the studio's archives.

== See also ==
- Ha Soo Whang
- Halla Pai Huhm
