= Newton H. Hall =

- Newton H. Hall received the Medal of Honor for gallantry for his actions during the 1864 Battle of Franklin.
- Born: August 4, 1842; Brimfield Township, Ohio, US
- Died: October 19, 1911 (aged 69)
- Military career
- Allegiance: United States; Union
- Branch: United States Army; Union Army
- Rank: corporal
- Units: Company I, 104th Ohio Volunteer Infantry Regiment
- Conflicts: American Civil War; *Battle of Franklin
- Awards: Medal of Honor

Newton H. Hall (August 4, 1842 – October 19, 1911) was an infantryman in the Union Army during the American Civil War. He received the Medal of Honor for gallantry at the Battle of Franklin during the 1864 Franklin-Nashville Campaign.

== Biography ==
Hall was born, raised and educated in Brimfield in rural Portage County, Ohio. He was the son of William and Bethiah (Palmer) Hall. His grandparents had moved to Ohio from New England following the American Revolutionary War.

Following the outbreak of the Civil War and President Abraham Lincoln's call for volunteers, he enlisted in his hometown in the 104th Ohio Infantry on August 4, 1862. Hall served as a private and then as a corporal in Company I. The regiment moved to Covington, Kentucky, on September 1, 1862, in preparation for the Defense of Cincinnati against a threatened Confederate invasion by troops under Edmund Kirby Smith. It was involved in the subsequent Skirmish at Fort Mitchel, Kentucky.

Hall and his comrades in the 104th OVI spent 1863 in Kentucky, and then moved to East Tennessee until April 1864. They were reassigned to duty as part of the XXIII Corps in Georgia, and Tennessee in late 1864. He captured a Confederate flag from the division of Patrick Cleburne during the fighting at Franklin in November; he was awarded the Medal of Honor a few months later. The regiment subsequently served in Washington, D.C. and North Carolina. Hall was mustered out of the army on June 14, 1865.

After the war, Hall returned to Ohio and engaged in farming in Brimfield Township. He married Stella Woodward (1847–1925) of Kent on April 15, 1874, and raised two children, Anna M Hall Woodworth (1877–1925) and Helen A. Hall (1879–1973). He joined the Masons. In 1881, he and his family moved to Kent, Ohio, and Hall embarked on a career as a businessman, holding an interest in a planing mill and a lumberyard in nearby Boardman.

== Medal of Honor citation ==
Rank and organization: Corporal, Company I. Place and date: At Franklin, Tenn., November 30, 1864. Entered service at: ---. Birth: Portage County, Ohio. Date of issue: February 13, 1865.

Citation:

Capture of flag, believed to have belonged to Stewart's Corps (C.S.A.).

== See also ==
- List of American Civil War Medal of Honor recipients: G–L
