= Damascus, Ohio =

- Census-designated place
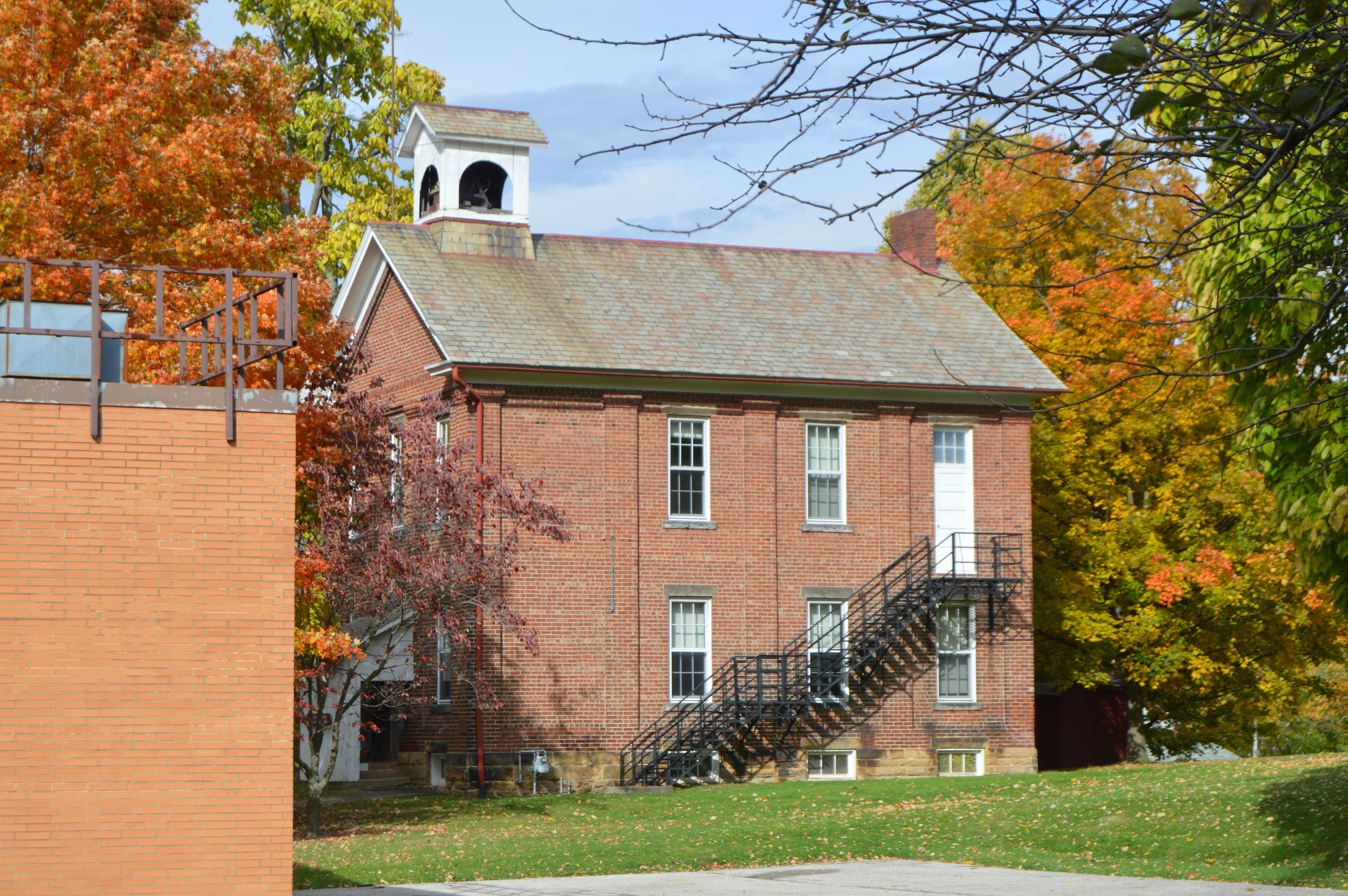
- Damascus Grade School (1902)

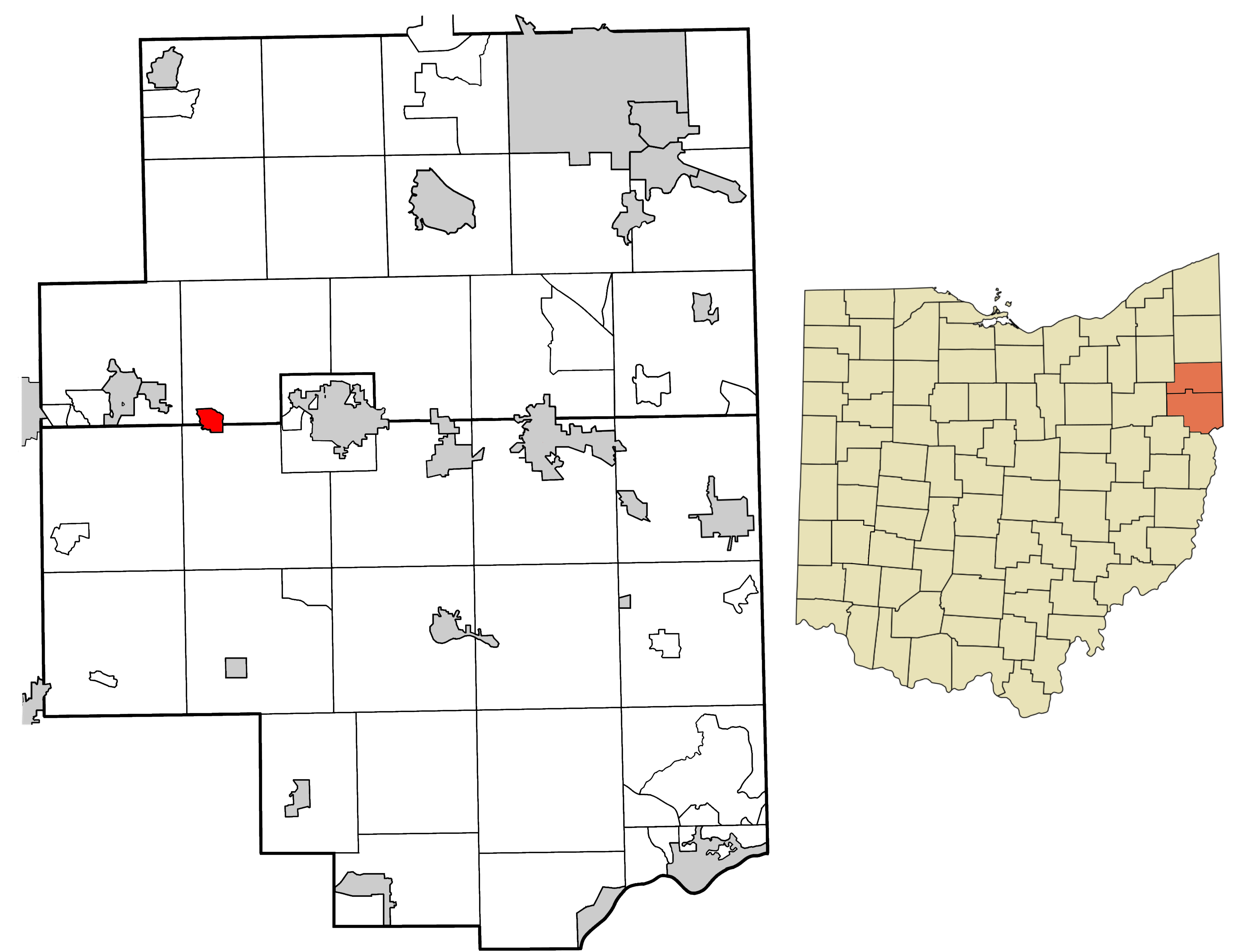
- Location of Damascus in Mahoning and Columbiana counties, Ohio.

- Location within Ohio Location within the United States
- Coordinates: 40°54′15″N 80°57′08″W
- Country: United States
- State: Ohio
- Counties: Mahoning, Columbiana
- Townships: Goshen, Butler

Area
  - Total: 0.81 sq mi (2.09 km^{2})
  - Land: 0.80 sq mi (2.07 km^{2})
  - Water: 0.0077 sq mi (0.02 km^{2})
- Elevation: 1,207 ft (368 m)

Population (2020)
  - Total: 418
  - Density: 523.3/sq mi (202.04/km^{2})
- Time zone: UTC-5 (Eastern (EST))
  - Summer (DST): UTC-4 (EDT)
- ZIP code: 44619
- Area codes: 330, 234
- FIPS code: 39-20030
- GNIS feature ID: 2628881
- School District: West Branch High School

Damascus is an unincorporated community and census-designated place in southern Mahoning and northern Columbiana counties in the U.S. state of Ohio. As of the 2020 census, it had a population of 418. The community lies at the intersection of U.S. Route 62 and State Routes 173 and 534.

The community is located in southwestern Goshen Township in Mahoning County and northwestern Butler Township in Columbiana County. Damascus has a post office, with the ZIP code of 44619. It is part of the Youngstown–Warren metropolitan area and the Salem micropolitan area.

== History ==
Damascus was platted in 1808. The community derives its name from the ancient city of Damascus, Syria. Damascus was originally built up chiefly by Quakers.

The Damascus post office opened in 1828.

== Demographics ==
Historical population
Census	Pop.	Note	%±
2010	443		—
2020	418		−5.6%
U.S. Decennial Census

== Notable people ==
- John C. Gaunt, soldier and Medal of Honor recipient
