= Abraham Greenawalt =

American Civil War Medal of Honor recipient

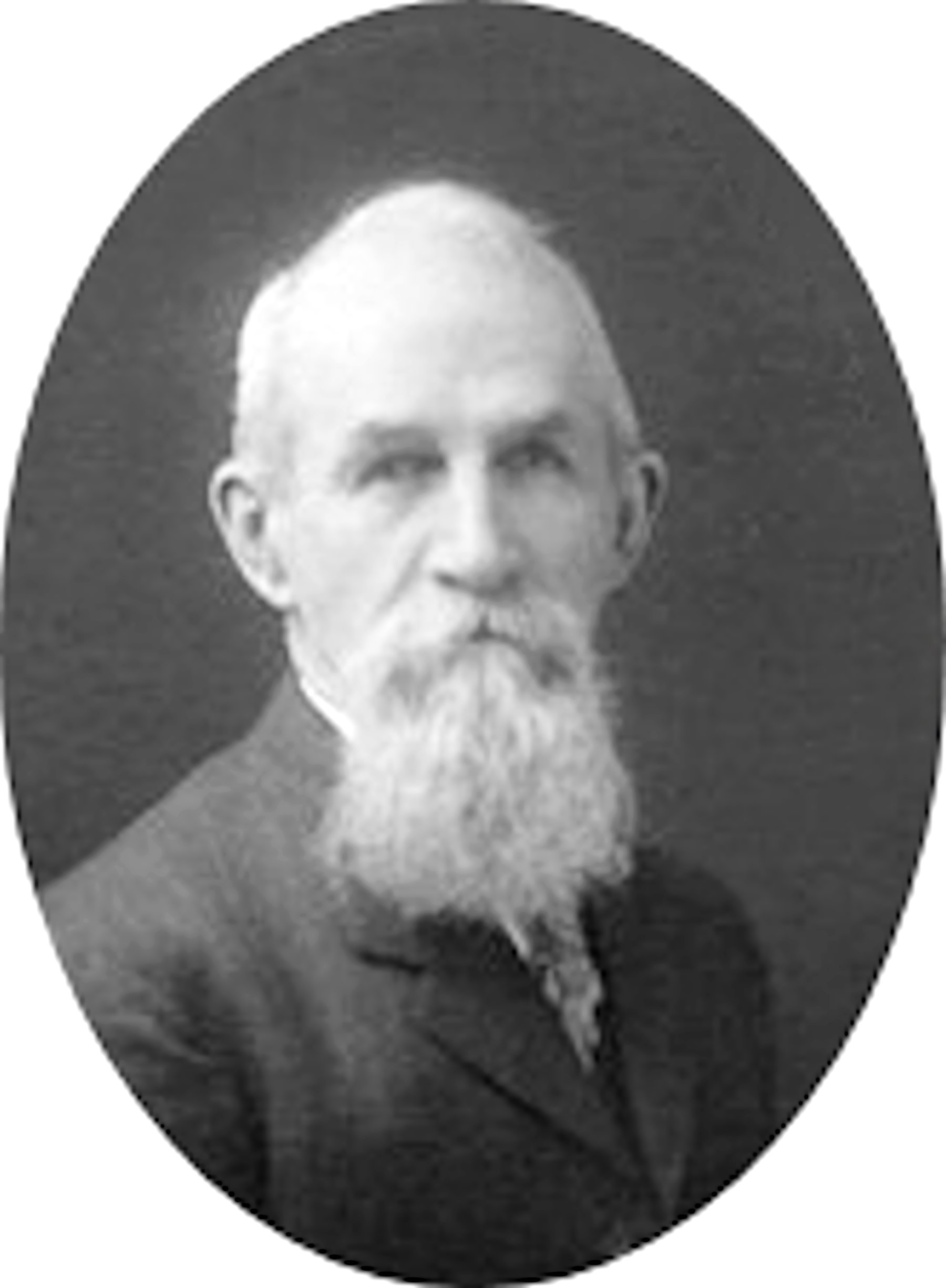
- Greenawalt in 1905
- Born: 1834; Montgomery County, Pennsylvania
- Died: October 27, 1922 (aged 87–88)
- Burial place: Alliance, Ohio
- Military career
- Allegiance: United States of America; Union
- Branch: United States Army; Union Army
- Service years: 1862-1865
- Rank: Private
- Units: Company G, 104th Ohio Volunteer Infantry Regiment
- Conflicts: American Civil War • Second Battle of Franklin
- Awards: Medal of Honor

Abraham Greenawalt (1834 – October 27, 1922) was a soldier in the Union Army during the American Civil War. He earned the Medal of Honor for the capture of a Confederate corps headquarters flag at the Second Battle of Franklin, Tennessee, on November 30, 1864.

Abraham Greenawalt is buried in Alliance, Ohio. The Greenawalt family were members of the Evangelical Lutheran Church.

== Medal of Honor citation ==
- Rank and organization: Private, Company G, 104th Ohio Infantry
- Place and date: At Franklin, Tennessee, November 30, 1864
- Entered service at: Salem, Ohio
- Birth: Montgomery County, Pennsylvania
- Date of issue: February 13, 1865

Citation:

Capture of corps headquarters flag (C.S.A.).

== See also ==
- List of American Civil War Medal of Honor recipients: G–L
