= Catherine Wehlburg =

39th President of Athens State University
- Incumbent
- Assumed office June 2023; Interim: June 2023 – May 2024
- Preceded by: Philip Way

Personal details
- Education: University of Florida

Catherine M. Wehlburg is an American academic administrator who researches student learning outcomes. She is the 39th president of Athens State University.

== Life ==
Wehlburg earned a B.S. in psychology and a M.Ed. and Ph.D. in educational psychology from the University of Florida.

Wehlburg researches teaching, learning, and the assessment of student learning outcomes. She served as president of the Association for the Assessment of Learning in Higher Education. She is the editor-in-chief of New Directions for Teaching and Learning. In June 2021, Wehlburg joined Athens State University as provost. She succeeded Philip Way as its interim president in January 2023. She was named the 39th president in May 2024, becoming the third woman to hold the position.
