= Joseph Davis (Medal of Honor) =

American Civil War Medal of Honor recipient

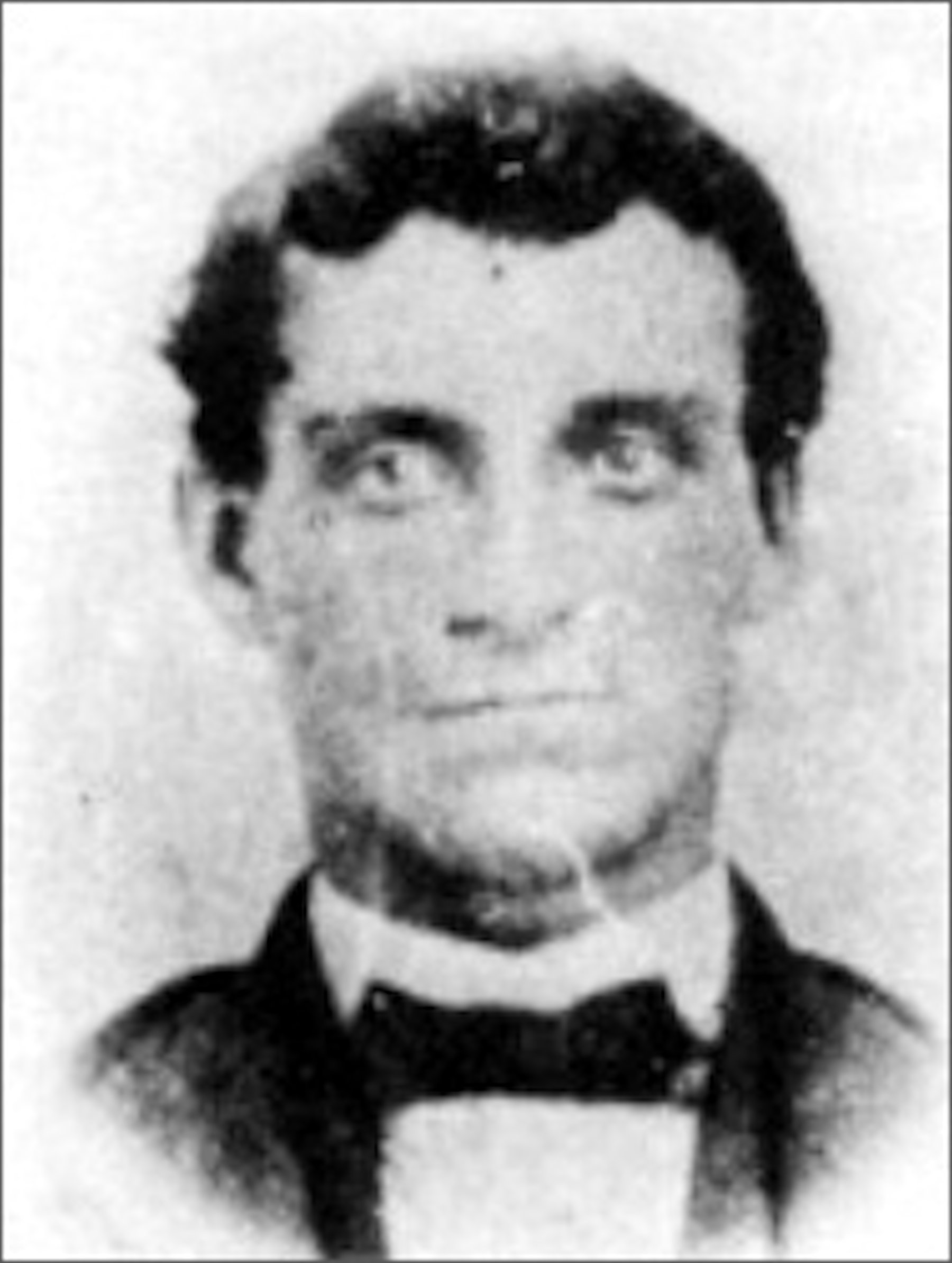
- Davis in 1865
- Born: May 22, 1838; Monmouthshire, Wales
- Died: May 22, 1895 (aged 57); East Palestine, Ohio
- Burial place: Boatman Memorial Cemetery
- Military career
- Allegiance: United States of America
- Branch: United States Army
- Rank: Corporal
- Unit: 104th Ohio Volunteer Infantry Regiment - Company C
- Conflicts: Second Battle of Franklin
- Awards: Medal of Honor

Corporal Joseph Davis (born May 22, 1838) was an American soldier who fought in the American Civil War. Davis received the United States' highest award for bravery during combat, the Medal of Honor, for his action during the Second Battle of Franklin in Tennessee on November 30, 1864. He was honored with the award on February 4, 1865.

== Biography ==
Davis was born in Monmouthshire, Wales on May 22, 1838. He enlisted in the 104th Ohio Infantry. His remains are interred at the Boatman Memorial Cemetery in East Palestine, Ohio.

== Medal of Honor citation ==
Capture of flag.

== See also ==
- List of American Civil War Medal of Honor recipients: A–F
