= Ha Soo Whang =

Korean American activist (1892–1984)

- Hangul: 황해수
- RR: Hwang Haesu
- MR: Hwang Haesu

Ha Soo Whang (Korean: 황해수; 1892–1984), was a Korean American social worker. She was the first Korean social worker in Hawaii, and acted as a bilingual interpreter for the families under her care. A graduate of Athens College, she was affiliated with the YWCA's International Institute. She is credited with spreading the art of Korean dance in Hawaii.

== Career ==
Whang was born in Korea and was educated in missionary schools there. She came to the United States and attended Athens College for Young Women (Athens State University). On her way back to Korea in 1922, she stopped in Hawaii, and was offered a job at the YWCA International Institute. While there, she started the HyungJay Club, where young Korean-American women could learn about traditional Korean culture, and the Mother's club, where elderly Korean women could become more familiar with American culture. Her goal was to bridge the gap between first- and second-generation Korean-Americans, but was foremost concerned with the well-being of the Korean community in Hawaii.

== Dance ==
Before Whang began her work, "respectable" Korean women did not dance, and men did so only when they were intoxicated. Whang did not teach dance herself, but rather found dancers who were willing to teach and connected them with students. Susan Chun Lee and Chai Yong Ha were two dancers she worked closely with in this capacity. Whang organized performances until 1942, when the International Institute was dissolved. She left Hawaii in 1943. Her work promoting Korean dance and culture in Hawaii was continued first by Halla Pai Huhm, then Mary Jo Freshley.

== Personal life ==
Her family was involved with the Korean National Association and her brothers were ordained Methodist ministers. Her nieces, Mary and Elizabeth, came to live with her in Hawaii after their mother, Chang Tae Sun, died.

== See also ==
- Halla Pai Huhm

== Bibliography ==
- Chang, Roberta; Patterson, Wayne (January 2003). The Koreans in Hawai_i: A Pictorial History, 1903-2003. University of Hawaii Press. ISBN 978-0-8248-2685-7.
