= Wesley Matthias Stanford =

American journalist

Wesley Matthias Stanford (born 15 March 1846) was an American bishop of the United Evangelical Church (predecessor to the United Methodist Church), elected in 1891.

== Birth and family ==
Wesley was born in Rockland Township, Venango County, Pennsylvania. He was the son of Abram and Susanna (Domer) Stanford, and grandson of Robert and Mary Stanford and of Matthias and Martha (Lusher) Domer. Wesley's mother was of German and his father of Scottish ancestry. Wesley married Rosa A. Weimer of southern Stark County, Ohio, 2 August 1870.

== Education and teaching ==
Being a farmer's son, Wesley was raised to hard work on the farm until he was twenty years old, receiving but three to four months of schooling each year. When he was eighteen he began teaching in the winter season for only $23.00 per month. He taught every winter thereafter until he was twenty-five.

Earning money during the winter by teaching, Wesley attended school in the summer. He first attended the Greensburg Seminary, a school operated by the Evangelical Association in Greensburg, Summit County, Ohio. Wesley attended there from the spring of 1865 through the fall of 1866.

Wesley earned the S.B. degree in the scientific and commercial courses from Mount Union College, Mount Union, Ohio in 1871. He worked on a railroad, digging and shoveling, to pay for his college courses. Being ambitious in his studies, he nearly always stood at the head of his classes, and was a most formidable antagonist to meet in debate.

After his marriage, he and his wife taught a graded school of two departments during the winter of 1870-71 in Osnaburg, Ohio. With the money earned he was able to finish his collegiate course the next summer, graduating without debt.

The Rev. Wesley Matthias Stanford was awarded an honorary degree of A.M. by the Central Pennsylvania College in 1890. Bishop Stanford was honored with a Doctor of Divinity degree in 1896 by his alma mater, Mount Union College.

== Ordained ministry ==
The Rev. Stanford entered the Pittsburgh Annual Conference of the Evangelical Association in Spring 1872. He was appointed as a missionary to Franklin, Venango County, Pennsylvania. He remained there three years, seeing about sixty conversions per year as the fruit of his labor.

His next two years were spent at Homeworth, Ohio. While there he pursued the study of Greek and German again, at his alma mater, Mount Union College. He then spent a most successful three years' pastorate in Pittsburgh, Pennsylvania. Then two years in Johnstown, Pennsylvania.

== Service to the greater church ==
In 1882 Rev. Stanford was called to be the Associate Editor of The Evangelical Messenger, the official English-language periodical of his denomination, with offices in Cleveland, Ohio. He served in this position until 1888. His Chief Editor was the Rev. Dr. H.B. Hartzler, who afterwards became one of Mr. D.L. Moody's co-workers in the great training schools at Northfield, Massachusetts (Hartzler also, later, becoming a Bishop of the Evangelical Association). During the more than six years of this assignment, the paper attained the highest circulation ever.

Rev. Stanford served as a delegate to General Conferences of his denomination in 1883, 1887, 1891, 1894 and 1898. He was also a delegate to the annual sessions of the Board of Missions. During the memorable 1887 General Conference of the Evangelical Association, meeting in Buffalo, New York, the beginnings of the 1891 schism were felt. Rev. Stanford, along with Dr. Hartzler, were allied with the so-called American spirited element of the Church, which opposed the so-called ecclesiastical autocracy of the denomination. This opposition, being in the minority at that time, was defeated.

In the Spring of 1888 Rev. Stanford was appointed again to the pastorate, this time in Canton, Ohio (in his old home conference). During the eighteen months of his work there, he gathered a harvest of over one hundred souls. In 1889 Rev. Stanford was elected as Editor and Publisher of an independent church paper, The Evangelical, with headquarters in Harrisburg, Pennsylvania. He conducted the business of this periodical very successfully, especially during the stormy years (for his denomination) of 1890 and 1891.

== Episcopal ministry ==
When the United Evangelical Church was established in 1891 as a division from the Evangelical Association, Wesley Matthias Stanford was elected one of its first Bishops at the General Conference held in October in Philadelphia. His episcopal term expired in October 1902 by the law of the church.

Bishop Stanford served as the Chairman of the Publishing Committee for the new Evangelical Church Hymnal in 1894. He was also an alternate delegate to the Ecumenical Conference of Methodism in London (1901). Bishop Stanford also took a leading part in the establishment of Western Union College, Le Mars, Iowa.

In 1902 the General Conference of the United Evangelical Church made Rev. Stanford the Editor of the official church paper, The Conference Journal, with headquarters in Pittsburgh. He was also elected President of the General Church Extension Society, and served as a fraternal delegate to the General Conference of the Church of the United Brethren in Christ, as well.

== See also ==
- List of bishops of the United Methodist Church
