= Athens College (disambiguation) =

Athens College is a co-educational private independent school in Psychiko, Greece.

Athens College may also refer to:

- Athens College, former name of Athens State University in Athens, Alabama, U.S.
- Athens College of Agriculture, former name of Agricultural University of Athens, Greece

== See also ==
- Athens Technical College, Athens, Georgia, U.S.
- Athens Female College (disambiguation)
- Athens (disambiguation)
