= Perry Township, Columbiana County, Ohio =

Township in Ohio, US

- Township
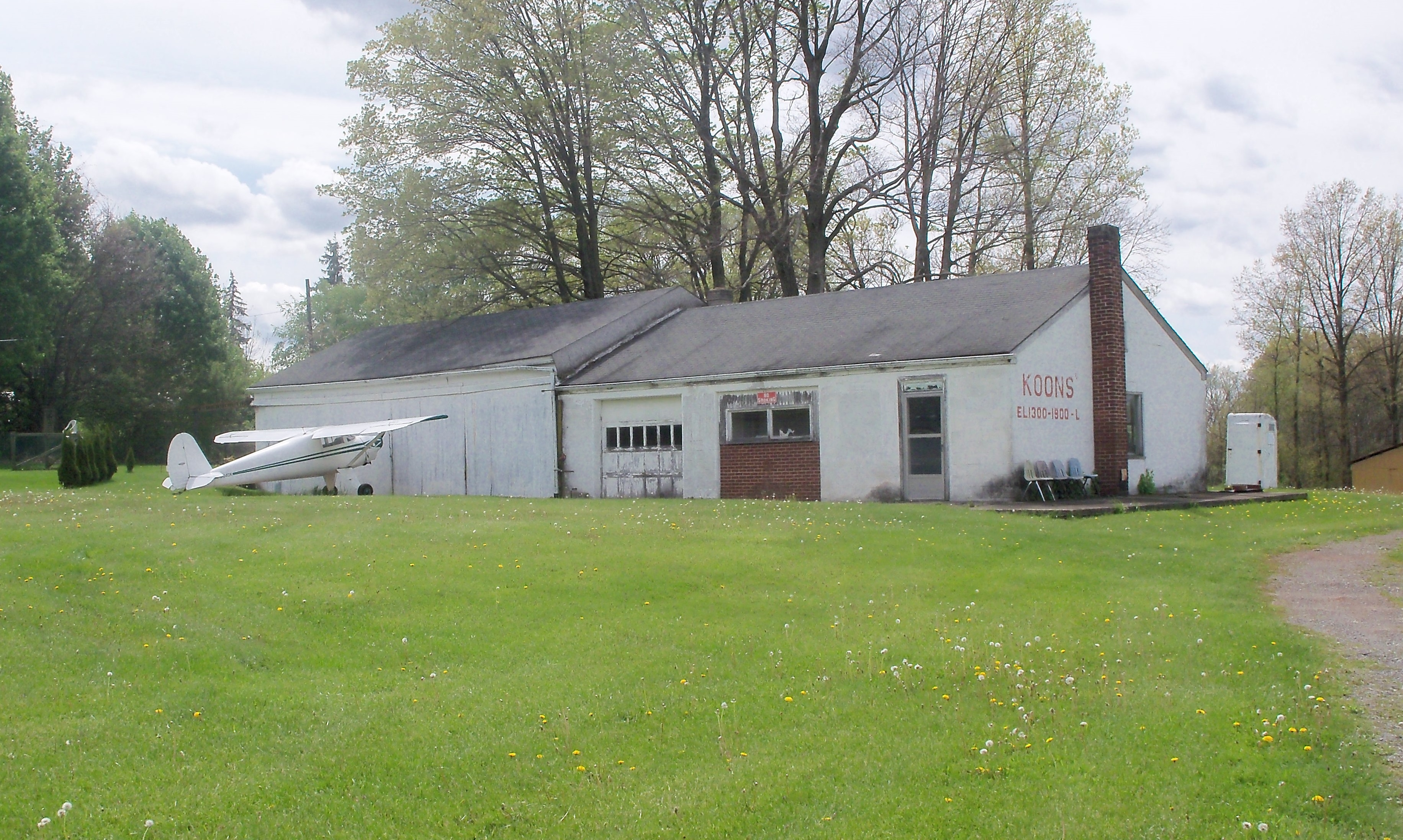
- Koons Airport is located on Ohio State Route 9

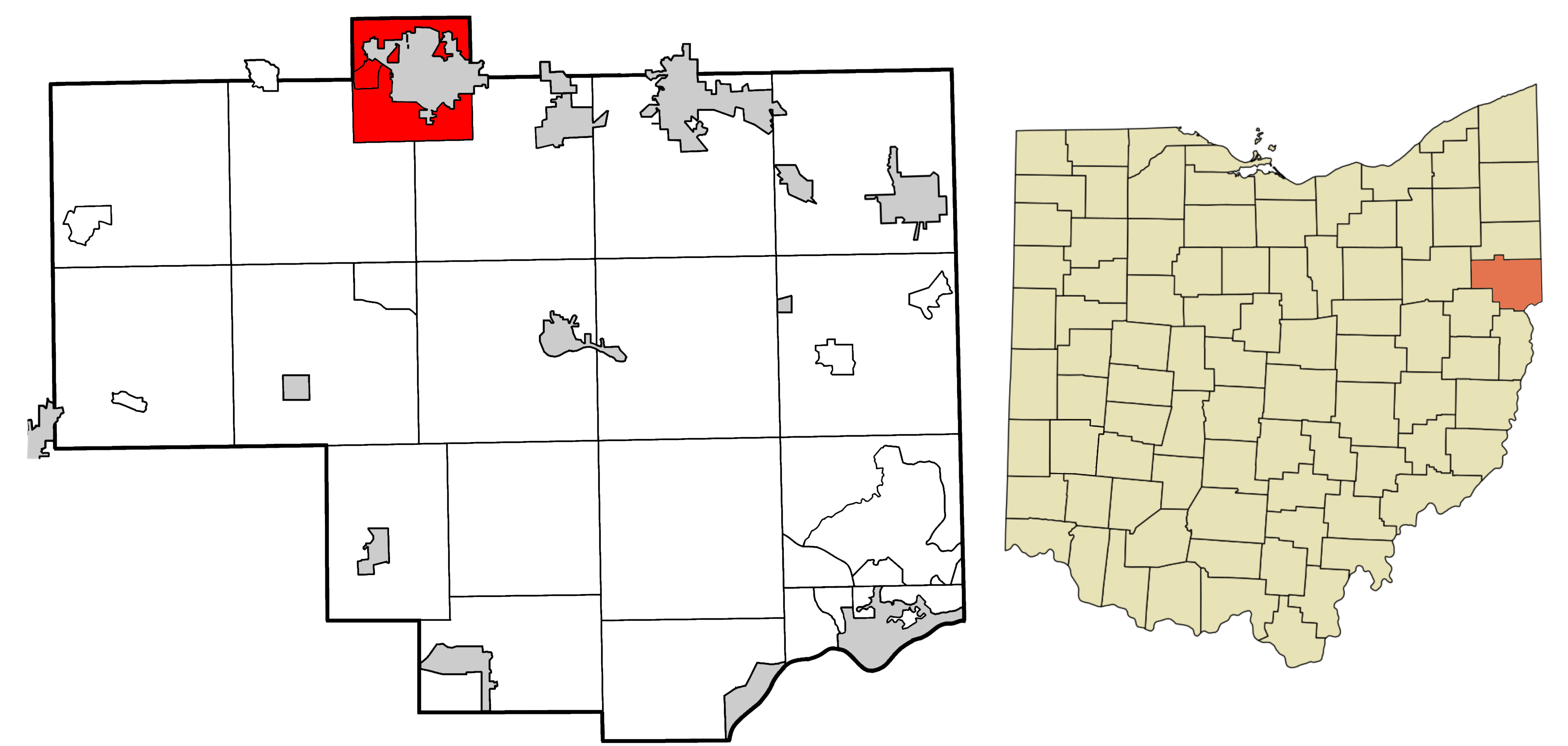
- Location of Perry Township in Columbiana County
- Coordinates: 40°54′6″N 80°51′19″W
- Country: United States
- State: Ohio
- County: Columbiana

Area
  - Total: 15.84 sq mi (41.02 km^{2})
  - Land: 15.82 sq mi (40.97 km^{2})
  - Water: 0.019 sq mi (0.05 km^{2})
- Elevation: 1,220 ft (372 m)

Population (2020)
  - Total: 16,318
  - Density: 1,032/sq mi (398.3/km^{2})
- Time zone: UTC-5 (Eastern (EST))
  - Summer (DST): UTC-4 (EDT)
- FIPS code: 39-61798
- GNIS feature ID: 1085900

Perry Township is one of the eighteen townships of Columbiana County, Ohio, United States. The 2020 census reported 16,318 people living in the township.

== Geography ==
Located in the northern part of the county, it borders the following townships:

- Green Township, Mahoning County - northeast
- Salem Township - southeast
- Butler Township - southwest
- Goshen Township, Mahoning County - northwest

It is the most northerly township in Columbiana County.

One city is located in Perry Township:

- The city of Salem, in the center

The census-designated place of Salem Heights is on the western edge of the township, along U.S. Route 62 (West State Street).

== Name and history ==
Historical population
Census	Pop.	Note	%±
1980	17,886		—
1990	17,215		−3.8%
2000	17,049		−1.0%
2010	16,850		−1.2%
2020	16,318		−3.2%

Perry Township is named for Oliver Hazard Perry, hero of the Battle of Lake Erie. It is one of twenty-six Perry Townships statewide.

The township was organized in 1832. Four sections of Green, four sections of Salem, four sections from Goshen and four sections of Butler townships, all then in Columbiana County, were given to the new township.

== Government ==
The township is governed by a three-member board of trustees, who are elected in November of odd-numbered years to a four-year term beginning on the following January 1. Two are elected in the year after the presidential election and one is elected in the year before it. There is also an elected township fiscal officer, who serves a four-year term beginning on April 1 of the year after the election, which is held in November of the year before the presidential election. Vacancies in the fiscal officership or on the board of trustees are filled by the remaining trustees.

=== Township Trustees ===
- Russ Sinsley (term 1/1/2026–12/31/2029)
- Tony Ieropoli (term 1/1/2026–12/31/2029)
- Steven J. Bailey (term 1/1/2024–12/31/2027)

=== Fiscal Officer ===
- John C. Volio (term 4/1/2024–3/31/2028)
