= North Georgetown, Ohio =

Unincorporated community in Ohio, U.S.

Coordinates: 40°50′35″N 80°59′09″W

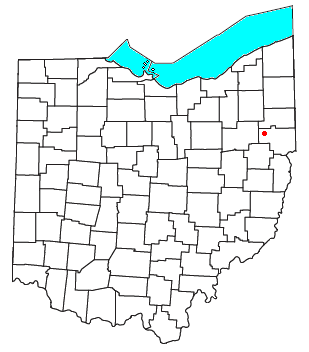
Location of North Georgetown, Ohio

North Georgetown is an unincorporated community in western Knox Township, Columbiana County, Ohio, United States. Although unincorporated, it has a post office, with the ZIP code of 44665. The town itself is located at the intersection of Georgetown Road (County Hwy 400) and Rochester Road (County Hwy 402).

== History ==
North Georgetown was laid out in 1830. The community derives its name from George Stidger, an original owner of the town site. A post office called North Georgetown has been in operation since 1833.
