= Halla Pai Huhm =

Korean-American dancer (1922–1994)

- Hangul: 함한라
- Hanja: 咸漢拏
- RR: Ham Hanra
- MR: Ham Halla

Birth name
- Hangul: 배한라
- Hanja: 裵漢拏
- RR: Bae Hanra
- MR: Pae Halla

Halla Pai Huhm (Korean: 함한라; alternately, Halla Huhm, Pai Halla, or Pae Yŏng-ja; 1922–1994) was a Korean-American dancer and the most well-known teacher of Korean dance in Hawaii. She established the Halla Pai Huhm dance studio, and after her death, the Halla Pai Huhm Foundation's Dance Collection was started from her collection of documents, photographs, and recordings. The archival collection was named a U.S. Irreplaceable Dance Treasure in 2001.

== Biography ==
=== Early life and education ===
Born in Busan, Pai Huhm moved to Japan with four siblings when she was five and was raised by her father's niece, Pai Ku-ja 배구자(裵龜子, 1905년 ~ 2003년.) Pai was a dancer who taught Huhm the foundations of modern, Japanese, and Korean dance. When World War II broke out, she returned to Korea. She studied Korean dance with Han Sung-jin and other masters, and continued her studies even after she immigrated to Hawaii in 1949. Huhm would regularly travel back to Korea as part of her job at a travel agency, and used this time to further her studies.

=== Honolulu ===
Huhm moved to Hawaii in 1949 to follow her husband, a Korean-American soldier. Huhm first appeared in Honolulu's theater scene during a production of Teahouse of the Autumn Moon at the Honolulu Community Theatre in 1954. She started teaching Korean dance informally in 1950, but by 1960 she had established a dance studio. She struggled to keep it open due to lack of financial support. This can be attributed to a belief at the time that only kisaeng dance. The studio's early struggles could also be attributed to local Koreans view that Huhm was "too Japanese" because she spoke fluent Japanese and got along well with members of the Japanese community. She kept the studio afloat using funds from her job at a travel agency.

In 1959, she began teaching Korean dance at the University of Hawaii at Manoa. She stopped teaching at the University in the 1970s, but maintained close ties with their Korean Studies Center. In 1983 she taught Korean dance at the Chongju University of Education. Huhm taught dance not only to preserve Korean dance in Hawaii, but also to pass on the traditions and values of her culture.

Some of her most well-known collaborations were with Cheon-Heung Kim 김천흥(金千興, 1909년 3월 30일 ~ 2007년 8월 18일), a dancer specializing in Korean court dances; and Ji San Lee, a shaman.

=== Legacy ===
The Halla Pai Huhm Korean Dance Studio is "the only continuous source of Korean dance and music in the United States". Huhm was the first recipient of the Outstanding Korean in Hawaii award. She also received a cultural medal from the South Korean government in 1980. Huhm died in 1994, and her memory was celebrated during several dance events planned by Mary Jo Freshley who continues to teach and run the studio.

The Halla Pai Huhm Foundation was named in her honor, and includes the studio she ran. It also includes an archive of documents and memorabilia Huhm collected. The archival collection was named a U.S. Irreplaceable Dance Treasure in 2001, and received grants to preserve the items in Hawaii's humid climate.

In 2013, Billie Lee made a documentary on Halla's work entitled, "Moving Home: The Legacy of Halla Pai Huhm."

== Selected works ==
- 1980, Kut, Korean shamanist rituals

== See also ==
- Ha Soo Whang
