= Chris Guillebeau =

American author and entrepreneur (born 1978)

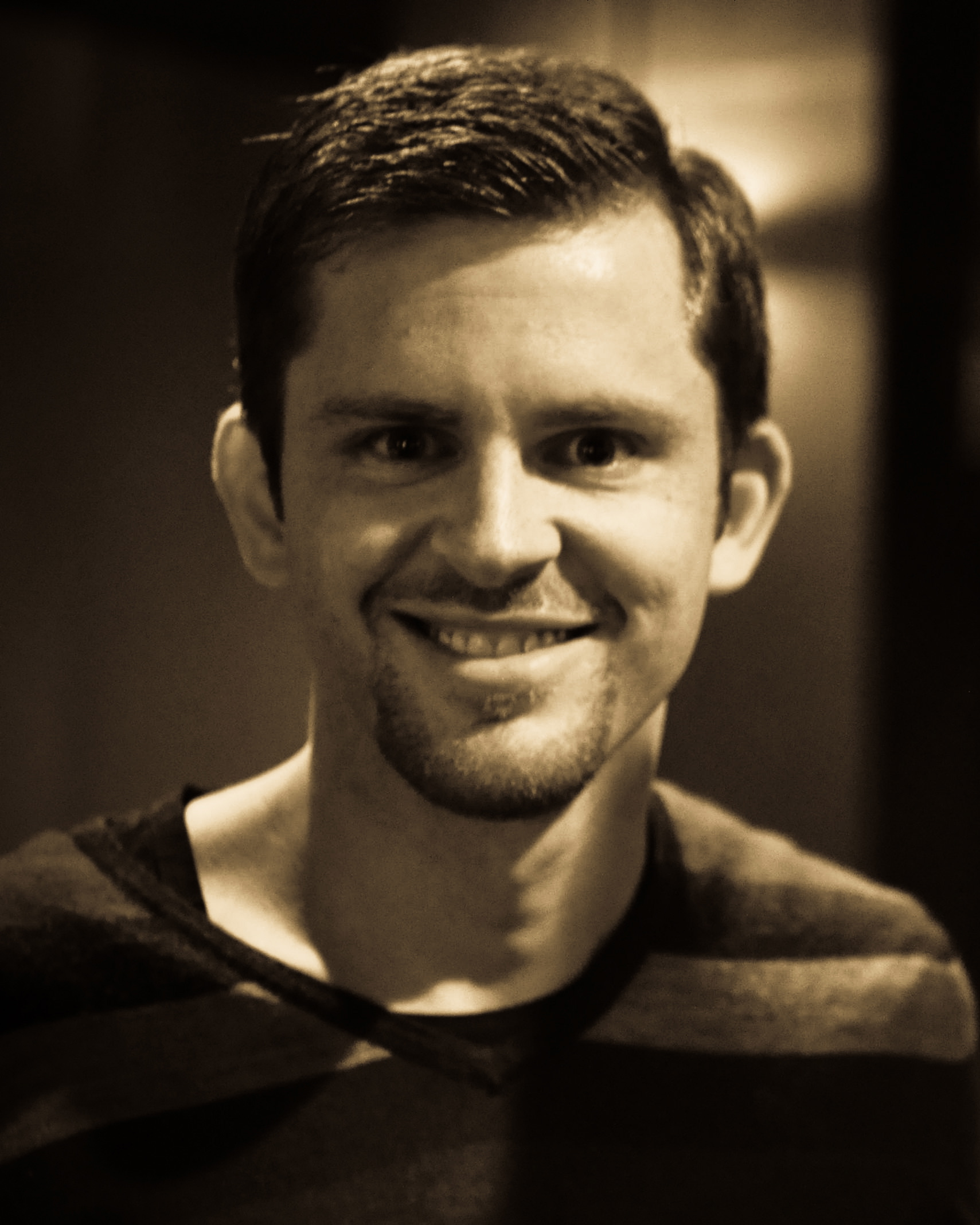
- Born: April 7, 1978 (age 48)
- Education: Athens State University (BA); University of Washington (MA)
- Occupations: Author; entrepreneur; blogger
- Writing career
- Language: English
- Subjects: Entrepreneurship; Travel
- Notable works: The Art of Non-Conformity; The $100 Startup
- Website: chrisguillebeau.com

Chris Guillebeau (born April 4, 1978) is an American author, entrepreneur, blogger, and speaker. He initially received attention for his entrepreneurship and travel blog, The Art of Non-Conformity, which led to the publication of a book of the same name in 2010. Since then, he has published seven additional books including The $100 Startup (2012), Side Hustle (2017), and most recently, Time Anxiety (2025). He also organized the annual World Domination Summit in Portland, Oregon from 2011 to 2022, and hosts the daily podcast, Side Hustle School.

== Early life and education ==
Guillebeau was born on April 4, 1978. When he was six years old, he and his mother moved to the Philippines and lived there for two years. As a teenager, Guillebeau dropped out of high school, but began attending college classes at age 16. He earned credits from multiple schools, ultimately graduating with a bachelor's degree from Athens State University in two and a half years. He then started graduate school at age 20 and operated a small wholesale business to fund his schooling.

From 2002 to 2006, he volunteered with the medical charity, Mercy Ships, in West Africa. After returning to the United States, he continued his graduate school studies, earning a Master of Arts degree in international studies from the University of Washington in 2008.

== Career ==
In 2008, Guillebeau founded the blog, The Art of Non-Conformity, which discusses a number of topics including entrepreneurship, self-employment, and travel. In June 2008, he released a free e-book through the blog entitled A Brief Guide to World Domination, which was ultimately downloaded over 100,000 times. Also in 2008, Guillebeau started using his blog to document his own goal of traveling to all 193 countries in the world by his 35th birthday in April 2013. The trips were funded primarily through self-employment income, accumulated airline miles, and other travel reward programs. He visited the last country on his list, Norway, on his 35th birthday.

During his travels, Guillebeau also engaged in other ventures. In 2010, he founded the Travel Hacking Cartel, a subscription service that provided prospective travelers with information on frequent-flyer programs and other travel deals. In September of that year, he published his first book, The Art of Non-Conformity, through Penguin. To promote the book, he went on a four-month tour (known as the "Unconventional Book Tour") to every U.S. state and Canadian province. 20% of the book's proceeds were donated to Charity:Water.

In 2011, he organized the inaugural World Domination Summit (WDS), an annual conference based in Portland, Oregon that was aimed at individuals with non-traditional career paths. Over the course of its existence, the WDS has had over 10,000 attendees with notable speakers including Brené Brown, Scott Harrison, and Gretchen Rubin (among others). At the second WDS event in 2012, Guillebeau gave all attendees a $100 bill to use on entrepreneurial ventures or charitable donations. In May of that year, he also released his second book, The $100 Startup, via Crown Business. It reached number 6 in its respective category on The New York Times Best Seller list. In 2013, Guillebeau started the foundation, Scholarships for Real Life, via WDS. Accepted applicants can receive as much as $12,000 in grant money to pursue their projects.

In September 2014, Guillebeau released his third book, The Happiness of Pursuit. His fourth book, Born For This, was released on April 5, 2016. To promote that book, he went on a 30-city tour throughout the United States. In January 2017, Guillebeau started the Side Hustle School podcast and online workshop. The podcast features stories of people who complement their traditional jobs with additional income sources ("side hustles"). The online workshop provides users with tools and information to create their own side hustles. Later in 2017, Guillebeau published his fifth book, Side Hustle: From Idea To Income In 27 Days. Another book, 100 Side Hustles, was released in June 2019 and featured 100 stories collected from the Side Hustle School podcast.

In April 2020, Guillebeau published his first novel, The Money Tree. As of 2020, he continues to host a daily episode of his podcast, Side Hustle School, and has written for numerous publications, including BusinessWeek, The Oregonian, The New York Times, and others.

In June 2022, Guillebeau hosted the tenth and final World Domination Summit (WDS) in Portland, Oregon. Reflecting on the final event, he wrote, “WDS is one of the greatest things I’ve ever been part of, and I feel proud of it in a way I don’t feel about almost anything else.”

His latest book, Gonzo Capitalism: How to Make Money in an Economy that Hates You was released August 22, 2023 by Little, Brown Spark.

His next book, Time Anxiety: The Illusion of Urgency and a Better Way to Live, was released on April 15, 2025.

In 2025, he held the first event post-WDS called "Neurodiversion." He plans to continue that event annually.

== Bibliography ==
Guillebeau has released nine books as of April 2025.

Title	Publication Date	Pages	Publisher	ISBN
The Art of Non-Conformity: Set Your Own Rules, Live the Life You Want, and Change the World	September 7, 2010	256	Penguin Group	ISBN 978-0399536106
The $100 Startup: Reinvent the Way You Make a Living, Do What You Love, and Create a New Future	May 8, 2012	304	Crown Business	ISBN 978-0307951526
The Happiness of Pursuit: Finding the Quest That Will Bring Purpose to Your Life	September 9, 2014	306	Harmony Books	ISBN 978-0385348843
Born for This: How to Find the Work You Were Meant to Do	April 5, 2016	320	Crown Business	ISBN 978-1101903988
Side Hustle: From Idea to Income in 27 Days	September 19, 2017	258	Pan Macmillan	ISBN 978-1524758844
100 Side Hustles: Unexpected Ideas for Making Extra Money Without Quitting Your Day Job	June 4, 2019	330	Ten Speed Press	ISBN 978-0399582578
The Money Tree: A Story About Finding the Fortune in Your Own Backyard	April 7, 2020	323	Penguin Random House	ISBN 978-0593188712
Gonzo Capitalism: How to Make Money in an Economy That Hates You	August 22, 2023	272	Little, Brown Spark	ISBN 978-0316491273
Time Anxiety: The Illusion of Urgency and a Better Way to Live	April 15, 2025	288	Crown Currency	ISBN 978-0593799550
