= George V. Kelley =

U.S. Medal of Honor recipient

George VanStavoren Kelley
- Kelley in 1865
- Born: March 23, 1843; Massillon, Ohio, US
- Died: November 4, 1905 (aged 62); Denver, Colorado, US
- Burial place: Riverside Cemetery; Denver, Colorado, US
- Military career
- Allegiance: United States of America; Union
- Branch: United States Army; Union Army
- Service years: 1861 - 1865
- Rank: Captain
- Units: Company A, 104th Ohio Volunteer Infantry Regiment
- Conflicts: American Civil War
- Awards: Medal of Honor

George VanStavoren Kelley (March 23, 1843 – November 4, 1905) was a line officer in the Union Army during the American Civil War. He received the Medal of Honor for gallantry at the Battle of Franklin during the 1864 Franklin-Nashville Campaign.

== Biography ==
Kelley was born and raised in enlisted in Massillon, Ohio. Following the outbreak of the Civil War and President Abraham Lincoln's call for volunteers, he enlisted in his hometown in the 104th Ohio Infantry on April 22, 1861. Kelley served as a sergeant in Company A. The regiment moved to Covington, Kentucky, on September 1, 1862, in preparation for the Defense of Cincinnati against a threatened Confederate invasion by troops under Edmund Kirby Smith. It was involved in the subsequent Skirmish at Fort Mitchell, Kentucky.

Kelley and his comrades in the 104th OVI spent 1863 in Kentucky, and then moved to East Tennessee until April 1864. They were reassigned to duty as part of the XXIII Corps in Georgia, and Tennessee in late 1864. Kelley was promoted to captain and commander of Company A. He captured a Confederate flag during the fighting at Franklin in November and was awarded the Medal of Honor a few months later. The regiment subsequently served in Washington, D.C. and North Carolina. Kelley was mustered out of the army on June 14, 1865.

After the war, Kelley returned to Ohio. At the age of 24, he married Fannie Bliss on October 18, 1866. Following her death, he moved to Denver, Colorado, and became a rancher. On May 15, 1890, he married a local resident Louisa Talitha Holloway (February 13, 1865 – February 6, 1902).

He is buried in that city's Riverside Cemetery.

== Medal of Honor citation ==
Rank and organization: Captain, Company A, 104th Ohio Infantry. Place and date: At Franklin, Tenn., November 30, 1864. Entered service at: Massillon, Ohio. Born: March 23, 1843, Massillon, Ohio. Date of issue: February 13, 1865.

Citation:

Capture of flag supposed to be of Cheatham's Corps (C.S.A.).

== See also ==
- List of Medal of Honor recipients
- Wikipedia Riverside Cemetery
