= John C. Gaunt =

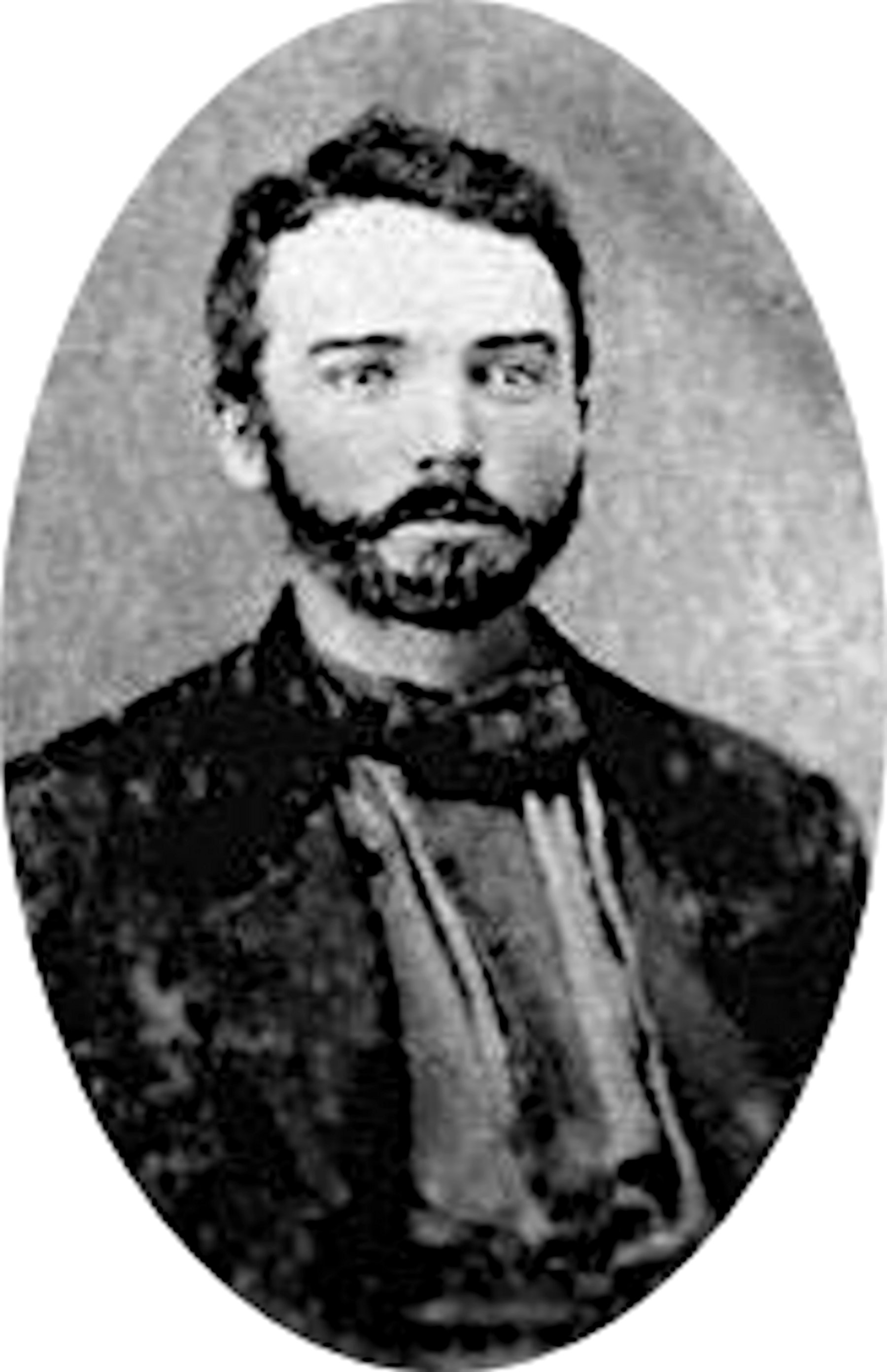
- Medal of Honor winner John C Gaunt
- Born: 1837; Columbiana County, Ohio, US
- Died: January 13, 1886 (aged 48–49)
- Burial place: Damascus, Ohio, US
- Military career
- Allegiance: United States of America
- Branch: United States Army
- Rank: Private
- Units: Company H, 104th Ohio Volunteer Infantry Regiment
- Conflicts: Battle of Franklin; American Civil War
- Awards: Medal of Honor

John C. Gaunt (1833 – January 13, 1886) was an American soldier who fought in the American Civil War. Gaunt received the United States' highest award for bravery during combat, the Medal of Honor. Gaunt's medal was won for his actions during the Battle of Franklin in Franklin, Tennessee on November 30, 1864. He was honored with the award on February 13, 1865.

Gaunt was born in Columbiana County, Ohio, and entered service from Damascoville, Ohio.

== Medal of Honor citation ==
The President of the United States of America, in the name of Congress, takes pleasure in presenting the Medal of Honor to Private John C. Gaunt, United States Army, for extraordinary heroism on 30 November 1864, while serving with Company G, 104th Ohio Infantry, in action at Franklin, Tennessee, for the capture of the flag.

== See also ==
- List of American Civil War Medal of Honor recipients: G–L
