= Homeworth, Ohio =

- Census-designated place
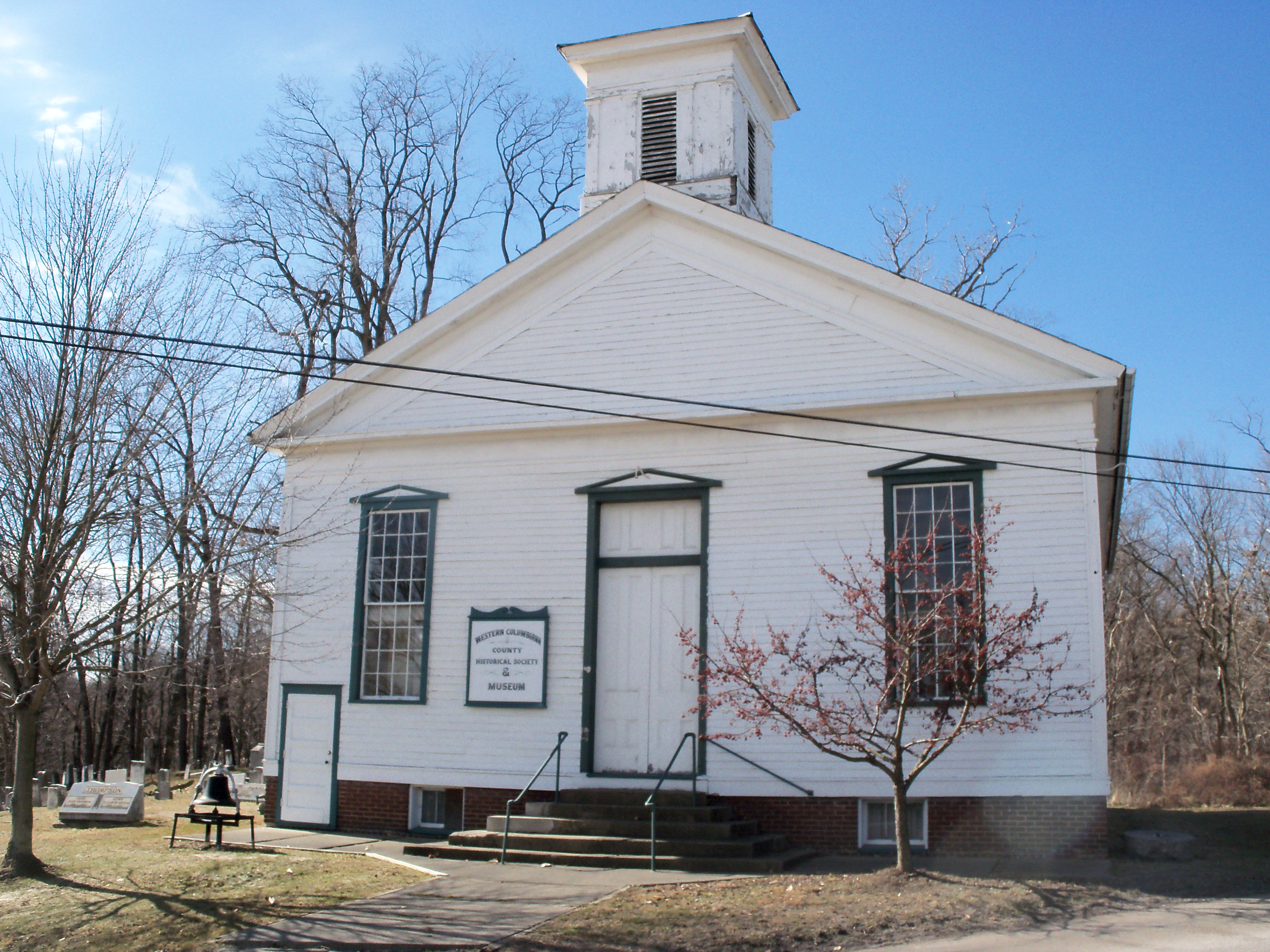
- Middle Sandy Presbyterian Church

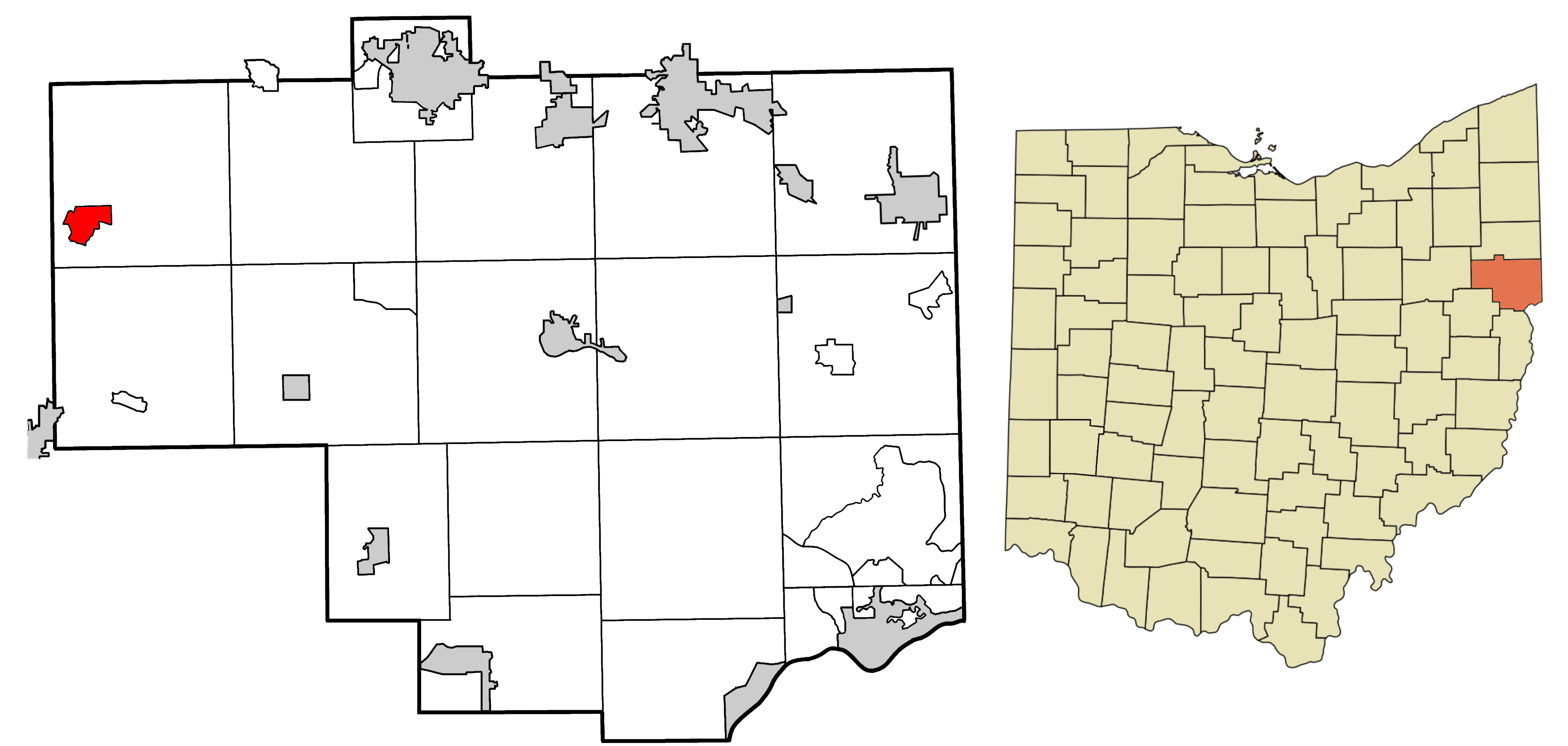
- Location of Homeworth in Columbiana County, Ohio.

- Location within Ohio Location within the United States
- Coordinates: 40°50′09″N 81°03′54″W
- Country: United States
- State: Ohio
- County: Columbiana
- Township: Knox

Area
  - Total: 1.25 sq mi (3.25 km^{2})
  - Land: 1.24 sq mi (3.21 km^{2})
  - Water: 0.015 sq mi (0.04 km^{2})
- Elevation: 1,148 ft (350 m)

Population (2020)
  - Total: 492
  - Density: 397.2/sq mi (153.35/km^{2})
- Time zone: UTC-5 (Eastern (EST))
  - Summer (DST): UTC-4 (EDT)
- ZIP code: 44634
- Area codes: 330, 234
- FIPS code: 39-36176
- GNIS feature ID: 2628903
- School District: West Branch Local School District

Homeworth is an unincorporated community and census-designated place in Knox Township, Columbiana County, Ohio, United States. The population was 492 as of the 2020 census. It is about 16.5 miles (26.6 km) east of Canton and has a post office with the ZIP code 44634.

== History ==
Historical population
Census	Pop.	Note	%±
2010	481		—
2020	492		2.3%
U.S. Decennial Census

Settlement began at what is now Homeworth about 1840. Homeworth was platted in 1851 when the Cleveland and Pittsburgh Railroad was extended to that point. Early variant names were Winchester and Sandy. A post office called Sandy was established in 1830, and the name was changed to Homeworth in 1869.

== Geography ==
Homeworth is located in northwestern Columbiana County, in the southwestern part of Knox Township. It is located in the valley of Middle Sandy Creek near its headwaters. Its elevation is 1,155 feet (352 m) above sea level. The city of Alliance is 7 miles (11 km) to the northwest. Salem is 12 miles (19 km) to the northeast, and Canton is 18 miles (29 km) to the west.

According to the U.S. Census Bureau, the Homeworth CDP has a total area of 1.25 square miles (3.25 km^{2}), of which 1.24 square miles (3.21 km^{2}) is land and 0.02 square miles (0.04 km^{2}), or 1.18%, is water.

== Education ==
Children in Homeworth are served by the public West Branch Local School District, which includes one early learning school, one intermediate school, one middle school, and West Branch High School.

== Notable residents ==
- Wesley Matthias Stanford – bishop of the United Evangelical Church
