= Butler Township, Columbiana County, Ohio =

Township in Ohio, US

- Township
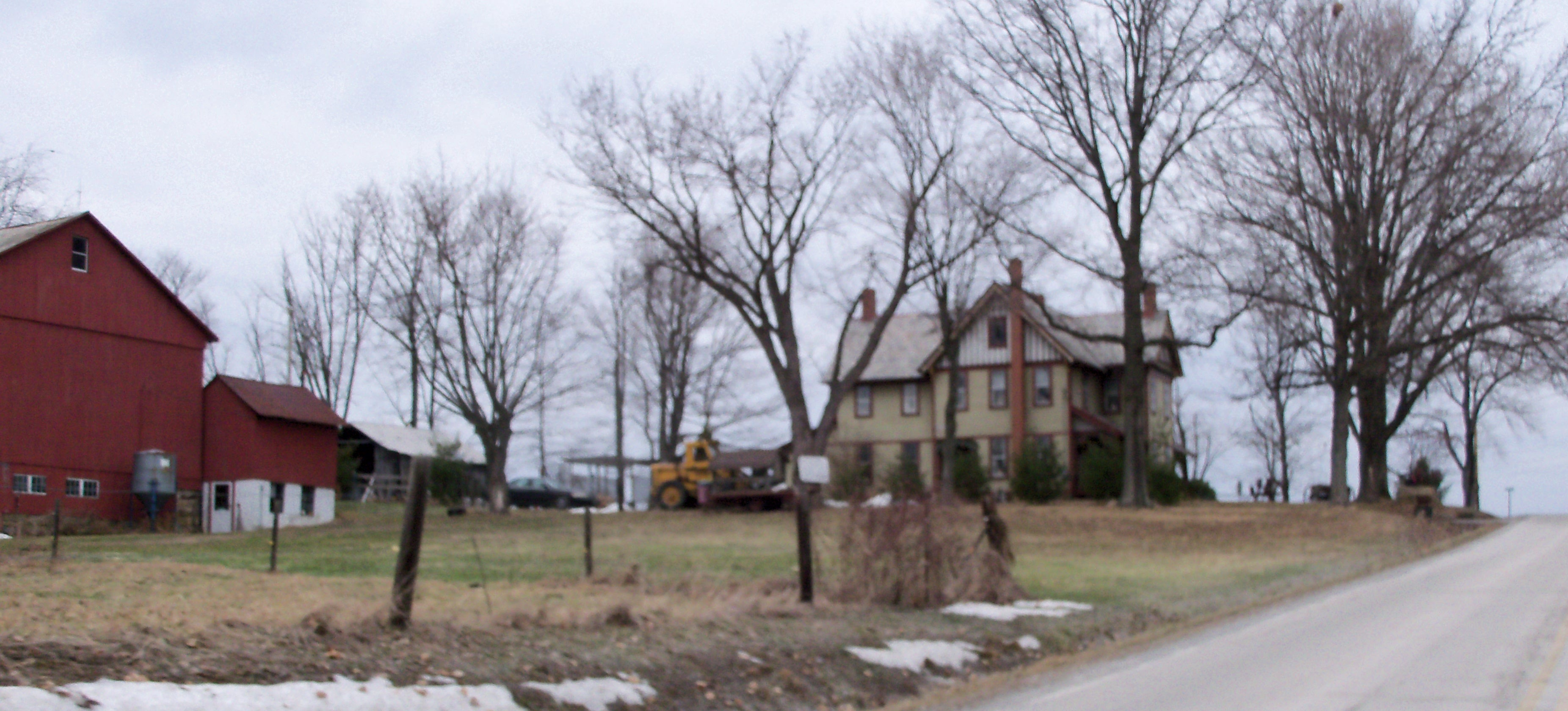
- Franklin Harris Farmstead on Depot Road

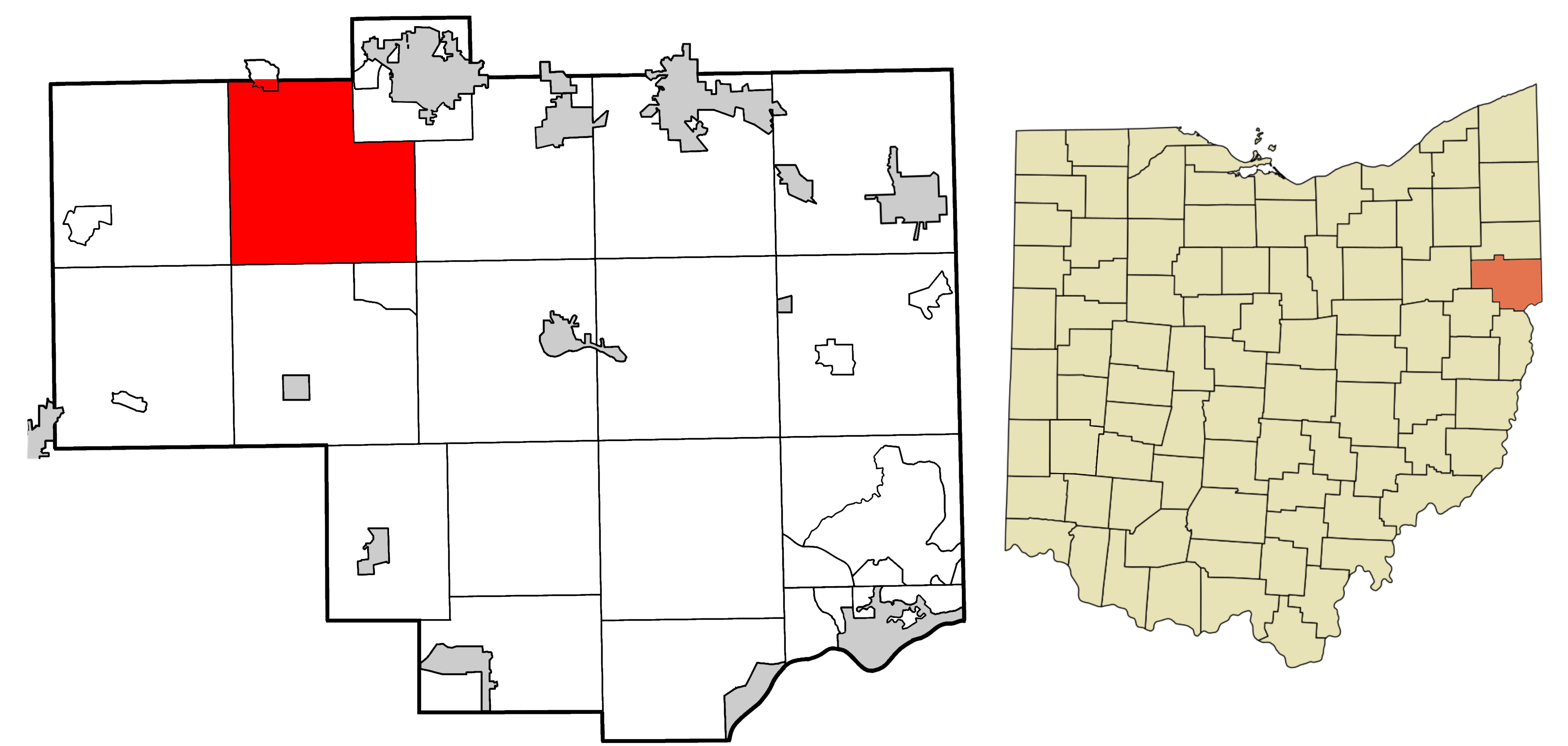
- Location of Butler Township in Columbiana County
- Coordinates: 40°51′25″N 80°55′27″W
- Country: United States
- State: Ohio
- County: Columbiana

Area
  - Total: 32.9 sq mi (85.3 km^{2})
  - Land: 32.9 sq mi (85.2 km^{2})
  - Water: 0.039 sq mi (0.1 km^{2})
- Elevation: 1,296 ft (395 m)

Population (2020)
  - Total: 3,542
  - Density: 108/sq mi (41.6/km^{2})
- Time zone: UTC-5 (Eastern (EST))
  - Summer (DST): UTC-4 (EDT)
- FIPS code: 39-10562
- GNIS feature ID: 1085889
- Website: https://www.butlertownshipohio.org/

Butler Township is one of the eighteen townships of Columbiana County, Ohio, United States. As of the 2020 census the population was 3,542.

== Geography ==
Located in the northwestern part of the county, it borders the following townships:

- Goshen Township, Mahoning County - north
- Perry Township - northeast
- Salem Township - east
- Center Township - southeast corner
- Hanover Township - south
- West Township - southwest corner
- Knox Township - west
- Smith Township, Mahoning County - northwest corner

Two unincorporated communities are located in Butler Township:

- The census-designated place of Damascus, in the northwest
- The unincorporated community of Winona, in the southeast

== Name and history ==
Historical population
Census	Pop.	Note	%±
1980	3,228		—
1990	3,265		1.1%
2000	3,444		5.5%
2010	3,614		4.9%
2020	2,542		−29.7%
U.S. Decennial Census

It is one of six Butler Townships statewide. The township was organized in 1806.

== Government ==
The township is governed by a three-member board of trustees, who are elected in November of odd-numbered years to a four-year term beginning on the following January 1. Two are elected in the year after the presidential election and one is elected in the year before it. There is also an elected township fiscal officer, who serves a four-year term beginning on April 1 of the year after the election, which is held in November of the year before the presidential election. Vacancies in the fiscal officership or on the board of trustees are filled by the remaining trustees.

=== Township Trustees ===
- Matthew S. Hall, Chairman
- Thomas G. Sanor, Vice Chairman
- Paul Lease

=== Fiscal Officer ===
- Jill M. Amos
