= Middle Sandy Presbyterian Church =

Historic church in Ohio, United States

- U.S. National Register of Historic Places
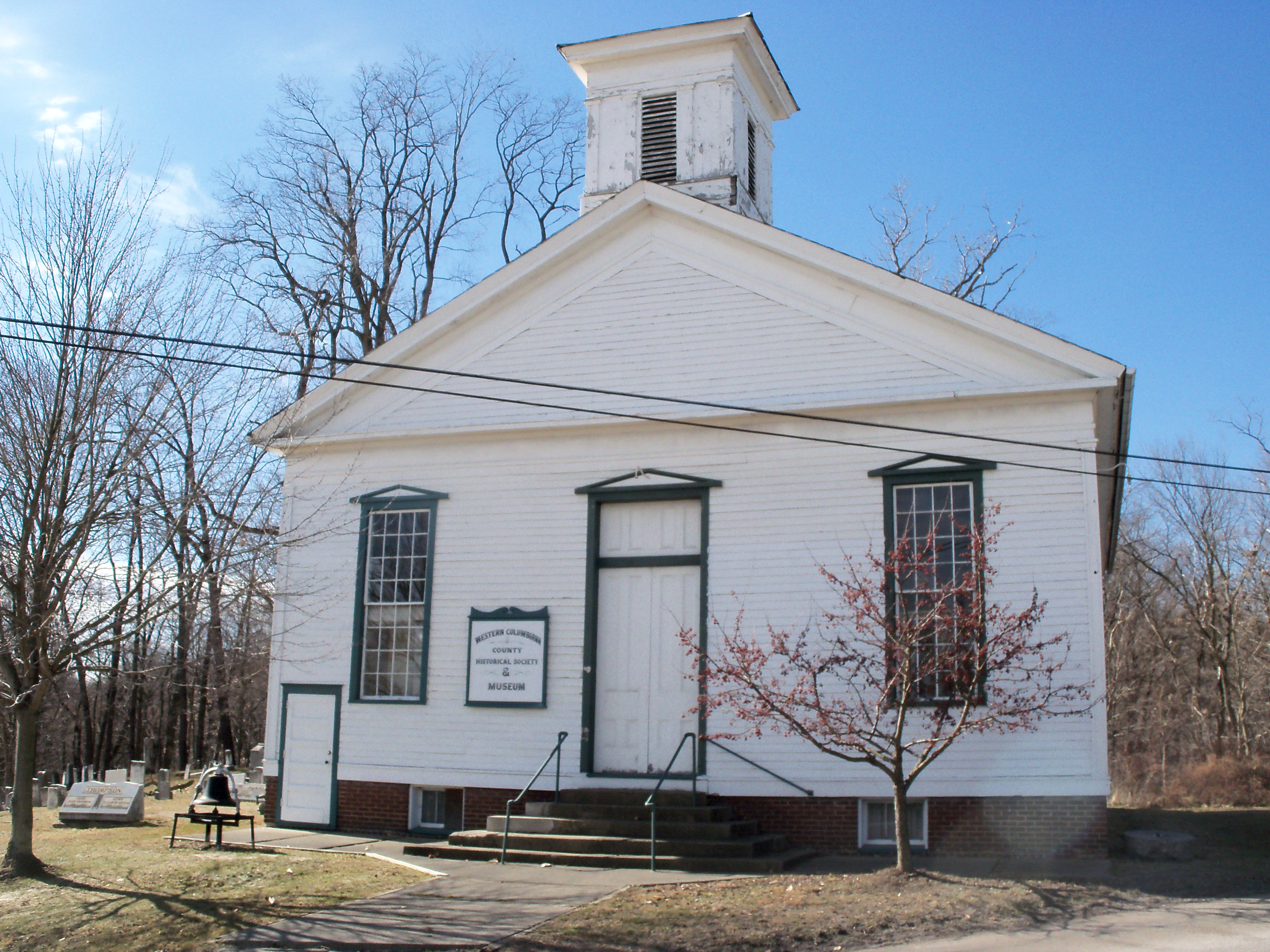

- Location within Ohio Location within the United States
- Location: Homeworth Rd., Homeworth, Ohio
- Coordinates: 40°50′16″N 81°4′10″W
- Area: less than one acre
- Built: 1853
- Architect: Thomas & Arnold & Co.
- Architectural style: Greek Revival
- NRHP reference No.: 94000414
- Added to NRHP: May 13, 1994

Middle Sandy Presbyterian Church (also known as Western Columbiana County Historical Society Museum; COL-13-1) is a historic church on Homeworth Road in Homeworth, Ohio.

It was built in 1853 and added to the National Register in 1994.
