= Goshen Township, Mahoning County, Ohio =

Township in Ohio, US

- Township
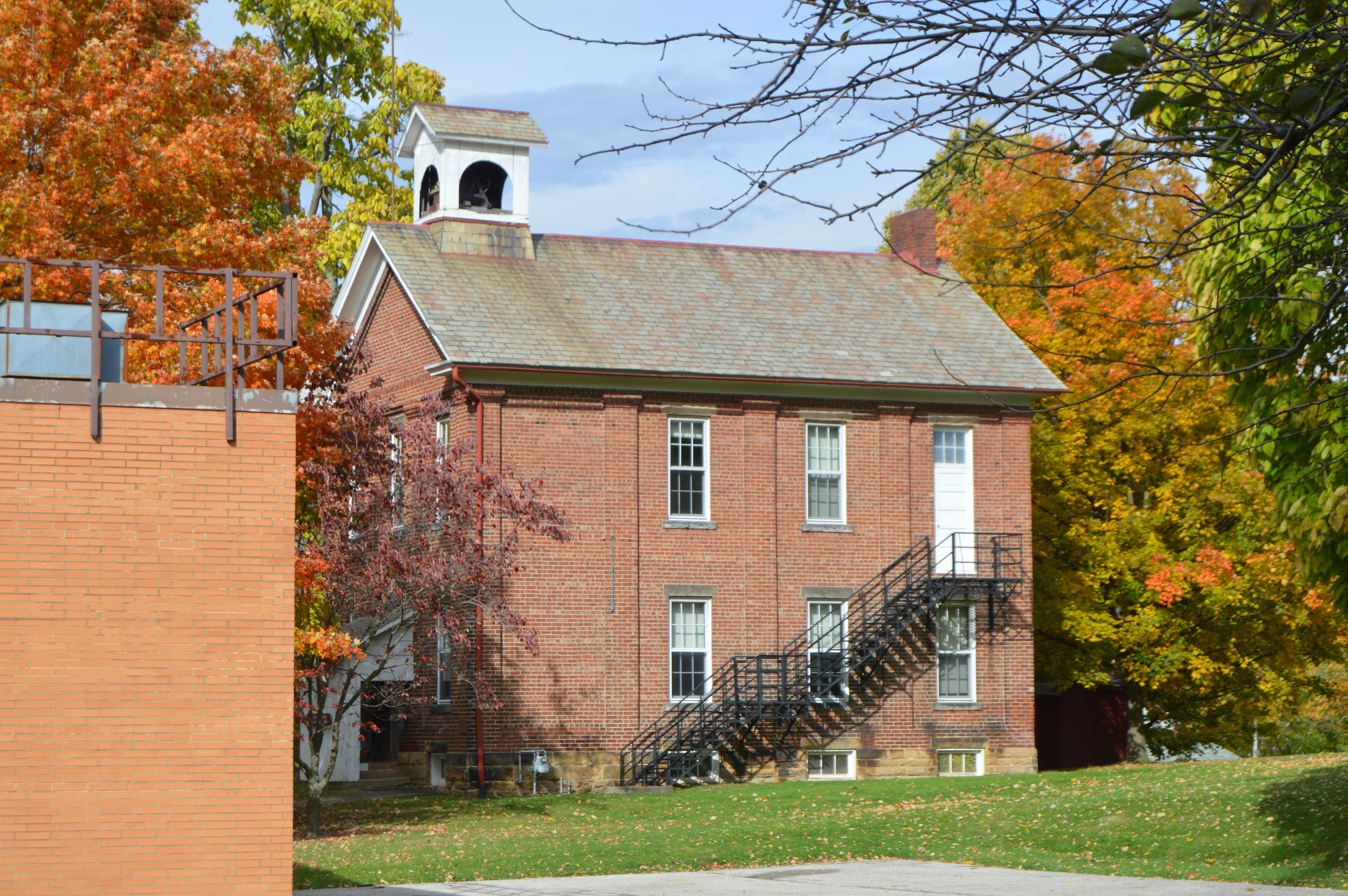
- Historic school in Damascus

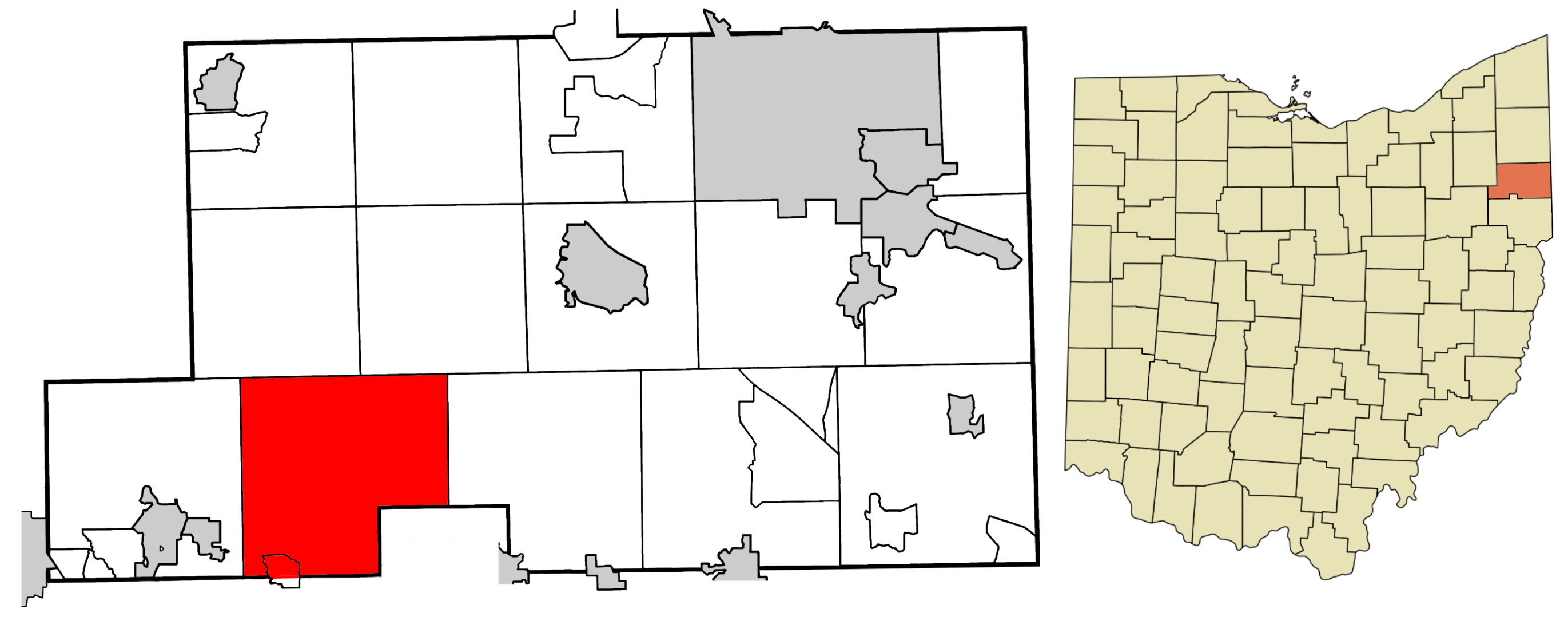
- Location of Goshen Township in Mahoning County
- Coordinates: 40°55′54″N 80°55′46″W
- Country: United States
- State: Ohio
- County: Mahoning

Area
  - Total: 32.8 sq mi (85.0 km^{2})
  - Land: 32.4 sq mi (84.0 km^{2})
  - Water: 0.39 sq mi (1.0 km^{2})
- Elevation: 1,217 ft (371 m)

Population (2020)
  - Total: 3,101
  - Density: 95.6/sq mi (36.9/km^{2})
- Time zone: UTC-5 (Eastern (EST))
  - Summer (DST): UTC-4 (EDT)
- FIPS code: 39-31038
- GNIS feature ID: 1086563
- Website: www.goshentownship.com

Goshen Township is one of the fourteen townships of Mahoning County, Ohio, United States. The 2020 census recorded 3,101 people in the township.

== Geography ==
Located in the southwestern part of the county, it borders the following townships:

- Ellsworth Township - northeast
- Green Township - east
- Perry Township, Columbiana County - southeast
- Butler Township, Columbiana County - south
- Knox Township, Columbiana County - southwest corner
- Smith Township - west
- Berlin Township - northwest

No municipalities are located in Goshen Township, although the census-designated place of Damascus lies in the southwestern part of the township.

== Name and history ==
Named after Goshen, Connecticut, is one of seven Goshen Townships statewide.

Goshen Township was established in 1810. For many years, the township was part of Columbiana County, before becoming part of Mahoning County in 1846.

== Government ==
The township is governed by a three-member board of trustees, who are elected in November of odd-numbered years to a four-year term beginning on the following January 1. Two are elected in the year after the presidential election and one is elected in the year before it. There is also an elected township fiscal officer, who serves a four-year term beginning on April 1 of the year after the election, which is held in November of the year before the presidential election. Vacancies in the fiscal officership or on the board of trustees are filled by the remaining trustees.
