= 104th Ohio Infantry Regiment =

- Active: 1862–1865
- Country: United States of America
- Allegiance: Union
- Branch: Volunteer Army, American Civil War
- Type: Infantry
- Size: 1000 soldiers at enlistment
- Part of: regiment
- Engagements: Defense of Cincinnati; East Tennessee campaign; Atlanta campaign; Franklin–Nashville campaign; Carolinas campaign

Insignia
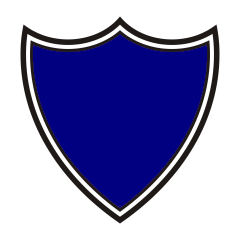
- 1st Brigade, 3rd Division, XXII Corps (Union Army), Army of the Ohio/Army of the Cumberland

The 104th Ohio Infantry Regiment, sometimes 104th Ohio Volunteer Infantry, was an infantry regiment in the Union army during the American Civil War. It played a conspicuous role at the Battle of Franklin during the 1864 Franklin–Nashville campaign, where six members later received the Medal of Honor, most for capturing enemy flags.

== Organization ==
The 104th OVI was organized at Camp Massillon on August 30, 1862, under Col. James W. Reilly in response to a need for additional three-years regiments.

Staff: Col. James Reilly, Lt. Col. Asa Mariner, Major Laurin Woodworth, Adjutant J. Walter McClymonds, Surgeon K.G. Thomas, Chaplain M.W. Dallas

- Company A: Captain Oscar W. Sterl
- Company B: Captain Jesse Coates
- Company C: Captain Andrew Bahney
- Company D: Captain Marcus C. Horton
- Company E: Captain A.H. Fitch
- Company F: Captain Joseph F. Riddle
- Company G: Captain Ezra Coppock
- Company H: Captain Walter Scott
- Company I: Captain John Wells
- Company K: Captain William Jordan

Among the nearly one thousand recruits in the 104th OVI was future United States Congressman Laurin D. Woodworth.

== Service record ==
The regiment moved to Covington, Kentucky, on September 1, 1862, in preparation for the Defense of Cincinnati against a threatened Confederate invasion by troops under Edmund Kirby Smith. It was involved in a skirmish at Fort Mitchel in northern Kentucky.

The regiment spent the rest of 1862 and most of 1863 in Kentucky defending railroads and Union installations against Confederate raiders. In August, it moved with General Ambrose E. Burnside's army to East Tennessee where it participated in the capture, occupation, and defense of Knoxville during the fall and early winter. Following a brutal winter at Strawberry Plains, TN in pursuit of James Longstreet's retreating forces, it was assigned to duty as part of the XXIII Corps for the Atlanta campaign. It participated in skirmishes at Dallas, Resaca, and throughout the campaign in northern Georgia, including the relief of Sprague's brigade at the Battle of Decatur on July 22, 1864.

The regiment successfully cut the Atlanta and Macon Railroad on 30 July 1864 as a part of the entire army's flanking movement on Jonesboro. The 104th played a key role in the 1st Brigade, 3rd Division's unsuccessful assault on Confederate fortifications at Utoy Creek on August 6, 1864, where it sustained its heaviest casualties of the war up to that point.

Following the fall of Atlanta in early September, Schofield's corps was sent north to assist General George Thomas in the defense of Tennessee from General John B. Hood's advancing army. The 104th and Schofield's army escaped Hood's trap at Spring Hill and helped repel the furious Confederate frontal assault at Franklin, TN, where the Confederate Army of Tennessee suffered over 6,000 casualties. After successfully defeating Hood's forces at Nashville in Dec 1864, Schofield's commanded transferred via Georgia, and Washington D.C., reaching North Carolina for the concluding portion of the Carolinas campaign. The regiment fought a skirmish near Wilmington, NC and was near Raleigh when word came of General Robert E. Lee's surrender at Appomattox, Va.

During its service it was assigned to:

- Reilly's 1st Brigade, Hascall's 3rd Division, Manson's XXIII Corps, Burnside's Army of the Ohio — Knoxville campaign
- Reilly's|Gault's 1st Brigade, Cox's|Reilly's 3rd Division, Cox's XXIII Corps, Schofield's Army of the Ohio — Atlanta campaign (first phase)
- Reilly's 1st Brigade, Cox's 3rd Division, Schofield's Army of the Ohio — Atlanta campaign (second phase)
- Reilly's 1st Brigade, Reilly's 3rd Division, Cox's XXIII Corps, Schofield's Army of the Ohio — Battle of Franklin
- Reilly's 1st Brigade, Cox's 3rd Division, Schofield'sXXIII Corps, Thomas' Army of the Cumberland — Battle of Nashville
- Sterl's 1st Brigade, Reilly's/Carter's 3rd Division, Cox's XXIII Corps, Schofield's Army of the Ohio — Carolinas campaign

The 104th OVI mustered out of the army on June 17, 1865.

=== Detailed service ===
The 104th OVI's detailed service is as follows (NOTE — Battles are Bolded, Italicized; campaigns are Italicized):

==== 1862 ====
- Defence of Cincinnati, Ohio, against Kirby Smith's threatened attack September 2–12, 1862
- Skirmish at Fort Mitchell, Covington, Kentucky, September 10
- Pursuit to Lexington, Kentucky, September 12–15
- Duty at Lexington till December 6
- Moved to Richmond and Danville, Kentucky, in pursuit of Morgan, December 6–26
- Duty at Point Pleasant until October 15, and at Gauley Bridge until December 20
- At Frankfort, Ky., till February 1863

==== 1863 ====
- Operations in Central Kentucky till August
- Expedition to Monticello and operations in Southeastern Kentucky, April 26 – May 12
- Burnside's Campaign in East Tennessee, August 16 – October 17
- Expedition to Cumberland Gap, September 4–7
- Operations about Cumberland Gap, September 7–10
- Knoxville campaign, November 4 – December 23
- **Siege of Knoxville**, November 17 – December 5
- Duty in East Tennessee until April, 1864

==== 1864 ====
- Atlanta campaign, May 1-September 8
- Demonstration on Rocky Faced Ridge and Dalton, Ga., May 8–13
- **Battle of Resaca**, May 14–15
- Cartersville, May 20
- Operations on line of Pumpkin Vine Creek and battles about Dallas, New Hope Church, and Allatoona Hills, May 25 – June 5
- Operations about Marietta and Kennesaw Mountain, June 10 – July 2
- Skirmishes about Lost Mountain, June 11–14
- Combats about Lost Mountain, June 15–17
- Muddy Creek, June 17
- Noyes Creek, June 19
- Cheyney's Farm, June 22
- Ulley's Farm, June 26–27
- **Battle of Kennesaw Mountain**, June 27
- Nickajack Creek, July 2–5.
- Chattahoochee River, July 5–17.
- Buckhead, Nancy's Creek, July 18.
- **Peach Tree Creek**, July 19–20
- Siege of Atlanta, July 22 – August 25
- **Battle of Atlanta**, July 22
- **Utoy Creek**, August 5–7
- Flank movement on Jonesboro, August 25–30
- **Battle of Jonesboro**, August 31-September 1
- Lovejoy Station, September 2–6
- Franklin–Nashville campaign, September 18-December 27
- Operations against Hood in North Georgia and North Alabama, September 29 – November 3
- Turkeytown and Gadsden Road, October 25
- Columbia, Duck River, November 24–27
- Columbia Ford, November 28–29
- **Battle of Franklin**, November 30
- **Battle of Nashville**, December 15–16
- Pursuit of Hood to the Tennessee River, December 17–28

==== 1865 ====
- At Clifton, Tenn., till January 15
- Movement to Washington, D. C., thence to Federal Point, N. C., January 15 – February 9
- Operations against Hoke near Fort Fisher, February 11–14
- Orton's Pond, February 18
- Fort Anderson, February 18–19
- Town Creek, February 19–20
- Capture of Wilmington, February 22
- Campaign of the Carolinas, March 1 – April 26, 1865.
- Advance on Goldsboro, March 6–24
- Occupation of Goldsboro, March 24
- Advance on Raleigh, April 10–14
- Occupation of Raleigh, April 14
- Bennett's House, April 26
- Surrender of Johnston and his army
- Duty at Raleigh till May 2, and at Greensboro till June
- Mustered out June 17, 1865

== Notable Members of the 104th OVI ==
The Battle cry at Franklin was "Remember Utoy Creek." Six men from the regiment were recipients of the Medal of Honor for gallantry at Franklin:

- Joseph Davis: Rank and organization: Corporal, Company C. Place and date: At Franklin, Tenn., 30 November 1864. Entered service at: ---. Birth: Wales. Date of issue: 4 February 1865. Citation: Capture of flag.
- John C. Gaunt: Rank and organization: Private, Company G. Place and date: At Franklin, Tenn., 30 November 1864. Entered service at: Damascoville, Ohio. Birth: Columbiana County, Ohio. Date of issue: 13 February 1865. Citation: Capture of flag.
- Abraham Greenawalt: Rank and organization: Private, Company G. Place and date: At Franklin, Tenn., 30 November 1864. Entered service at: Salem, Ohio. Birth: Montgomery County, Pa. Date of issue: 13 February 1865. Citation: Capture of corps headquarters flag (C.S.A.).
- Newton H. Hall: Rank and organization: Corporal, Company I. Place and date: At Franklin, Tenn., 30 November 1864. Entered service at: ---. Birth: Portage County, Ohio. Date of issue: 13 February 1865. Citation: Capture of flag, believed to have belonged to Stewart's Corps (C.S.A.).
- George V. Kelley: Rank and organization: Captain, Company A. Place and date: At Franklin, Tenn., 30 November 1864. Entered service at: Massillon, Ohio. Born: 23 March 1843, Massillon, Ohio. Date of issue: 13 February 1865. Citation: Capture of flag supposed to be of Cheatham's Corps (C.S.A.).
- John H. Ricksecker: Rank and organization: Private, Company D. Place and date: At Franklin, Tenn., 30 November 1864. Entered service at: ---. Birth: Springfield, Ohio. Date of issue: 3 February 1865. Citation: Capture of flag of 16th Alabama Artillery (C.S.A.).

== Casualties and losses ==
During its term of service, the regiment had 3 officers and 46 enlisted men killed or mortally wounded in combat. It also lost 4 officers and 130 enlisted men by disease, for a total of 183 fatalities out of the 1,740 men who served at various times in the regiment.
