= Athens State University =

Public university in Athens, Alabama, US

- Former names: Athens Female Academy (1822–1842); Athens Female Institute (1842–1889); Athens Female College (1889–1931); Athens College (1931–1998)
- Type: Public upper-division university
- Established: December 9, 1822; 203 years ago
- President: Catherine Wehlburg
- Students: 3,500
- Location: Athens, Alabama, United States; 34°48′20″N 86°58′0″W
- Nickname: Bears
- Mascot: Hebrew the Bear
- Website: athens.edu

Athens State University is a public upper-division university in Athens, Alabama. Athens State is one of the few universities in the nation dedicated solely to degree completion for transfer students, meaning the university serves junior-level and senior-level undergraduate students by helping them finish their degrees. Athens State also serves graduate students in their pursuit of career advancement through a master’s degree. The school's academics are housed in three colleges: Education, Arts and Sciences, and Business.

== History ==
Athens State University is Alabama's oldest educational institution of higher learning. It began as the Athens Female Academy in 1822. The Methodist Church began oversight of the institution in 1842, changing the name to Athens Female Institute. It became Athens Female College in 1889.

In 1931, the name was shortened to Athens College when it became coeducational.

On May 10, 1974, the board of trustees requested from the North Alabama Conference of the United Methodist Church that the college seek affiliation with the State of Alabama. At its annual meeting in June 1974, the conference gave the board this permission and authorized the transfer of the college to the State of Alabama.

In June 1975, the college was accepted by the Alabama State Board of Education subject to the appropriation of operating funds by the Alabama legislature. Later that year, the legislature appropriated funds for the operation of the college to serve the graduates of state junior, community, and technical colleges/institutions.

Later, in 1998, the college became Athens State University.

On May 11, 2012, a bill was passed by the Alabama legislature allowing the creation of an autonomous board of trustees for the university. This board took office in October 2012. Athens State University remains the only university in the State of Alabama to focus solely on transfer students seeking degree completion.

Undergraduate demographics as of Fall 2023
| Race and ethnicity | Total |
|---|---|
| White | 76% |
| Black | 12% |
| Hispanic | 5% |
| Two or more races | 4% |
| American Indian/Alaska Native | 1% |
| Asian | 1% |
| Unknown | 1% |
Economic diversity
| Low-income (Note: The percentage of students who received an income-based federal Pell grant intended for low-income students.) | 43% |
| Affluent (Note: The percentage of students who are a part of the American middle class at the bare minimum.) | 57% |

== Athens State College Historic District ==
- Athens State College Historic District
- U.S. National Register of Historic Places
- U.S. Historic district
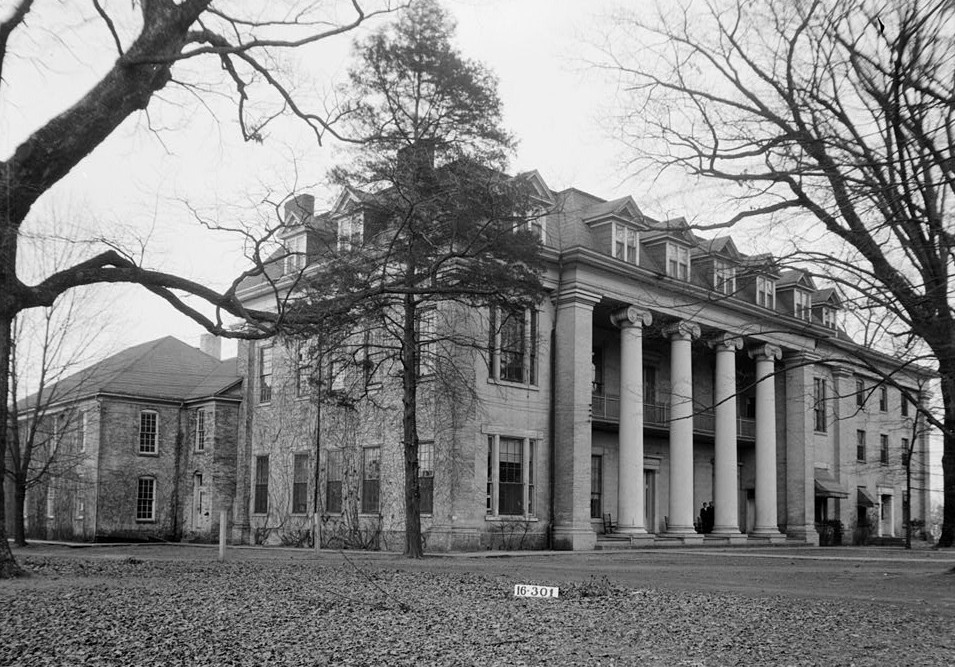
- Founders Hall is a contributing property to the historic district

- Location within Alabama Location within the United States
- Location: 202--212 and 311 N. Beaty St., central campus area roughly bounded by Beaty, Pryor and Hobbs Sts., Athens, Alabama
- Area: 8.6 acres (3.5 ha)
- Built: 1842
- Architect: Hiram Higgins
- Architectural style: Late 19th And 20th Century Revivals, Greek Revival, Queen Anne
- NRHP reference No.: 85000254
- Added to NRHP: February 14, 1985

The Athens State College Historic District was named to the National Register of Historic Places on February 14, 1985. It includes Founders Hall, which was built in 1842–44. Founders Hall is individually listed on the Alabama Register of Landmarks and Heritage.

== Notable alumni ==
- Chris Guillebeau, personal development author
- Mike Kirkland (politician), member of the Alabama House of Representatives
- Steve Mizerak, billiards, winner of the U.S. Open in the 1970s
- Gary Redus, Major League Baseball player
- Dale Strong, member of the U.S. House of Representatives
- Ha Soo Whang, social worker

== See also ==
- Athens College (disambiguation)
- Calhoun Community College, a 2 year community college that has many programs for students to transfer to Athens State
- Tennessee Wesleyan College, once also known as Athens Female College
