= Hanover Township, Columbiana County, Ohio =

Township in Ohio, US

- Township
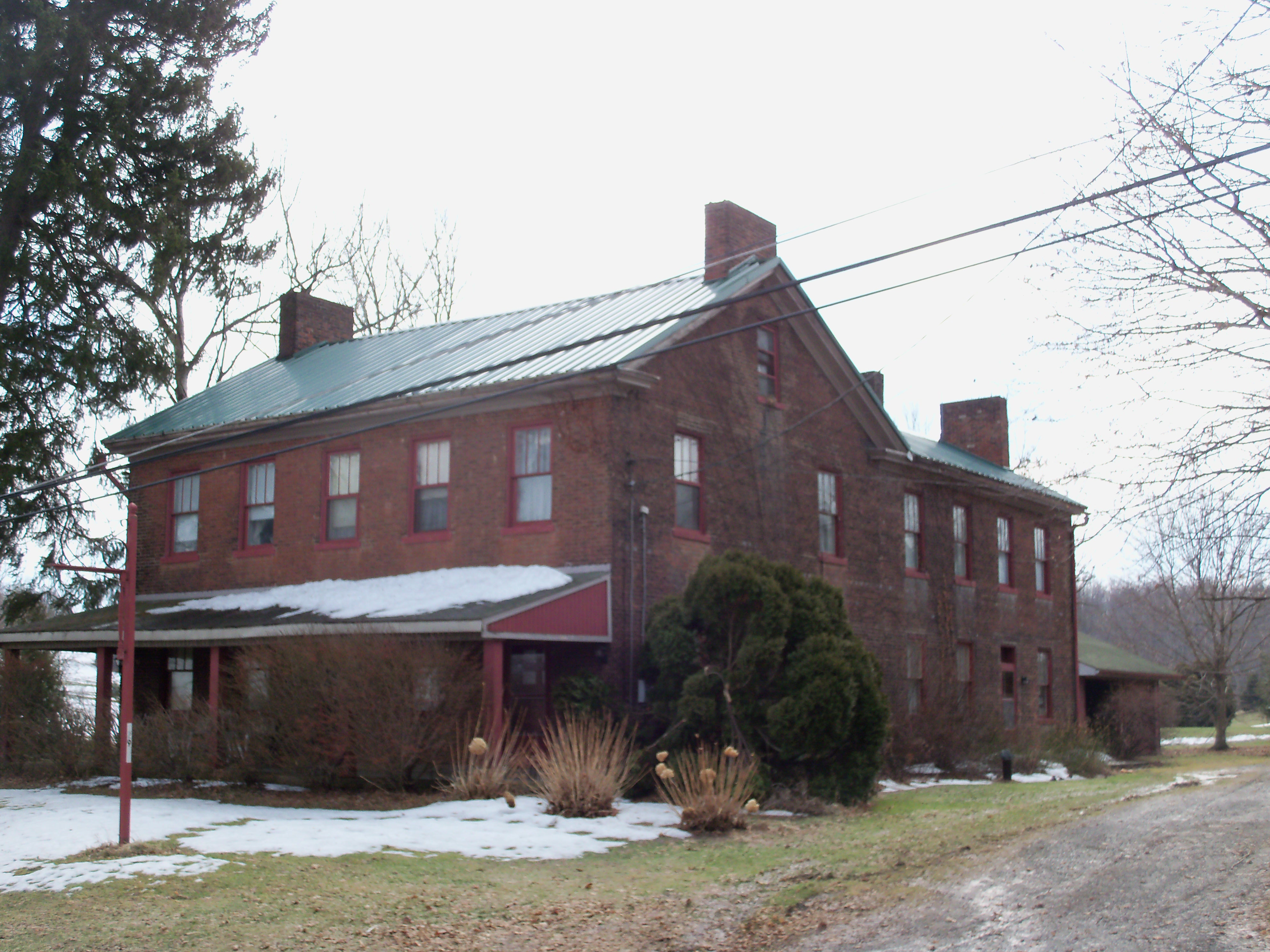
- Hostetter Inn

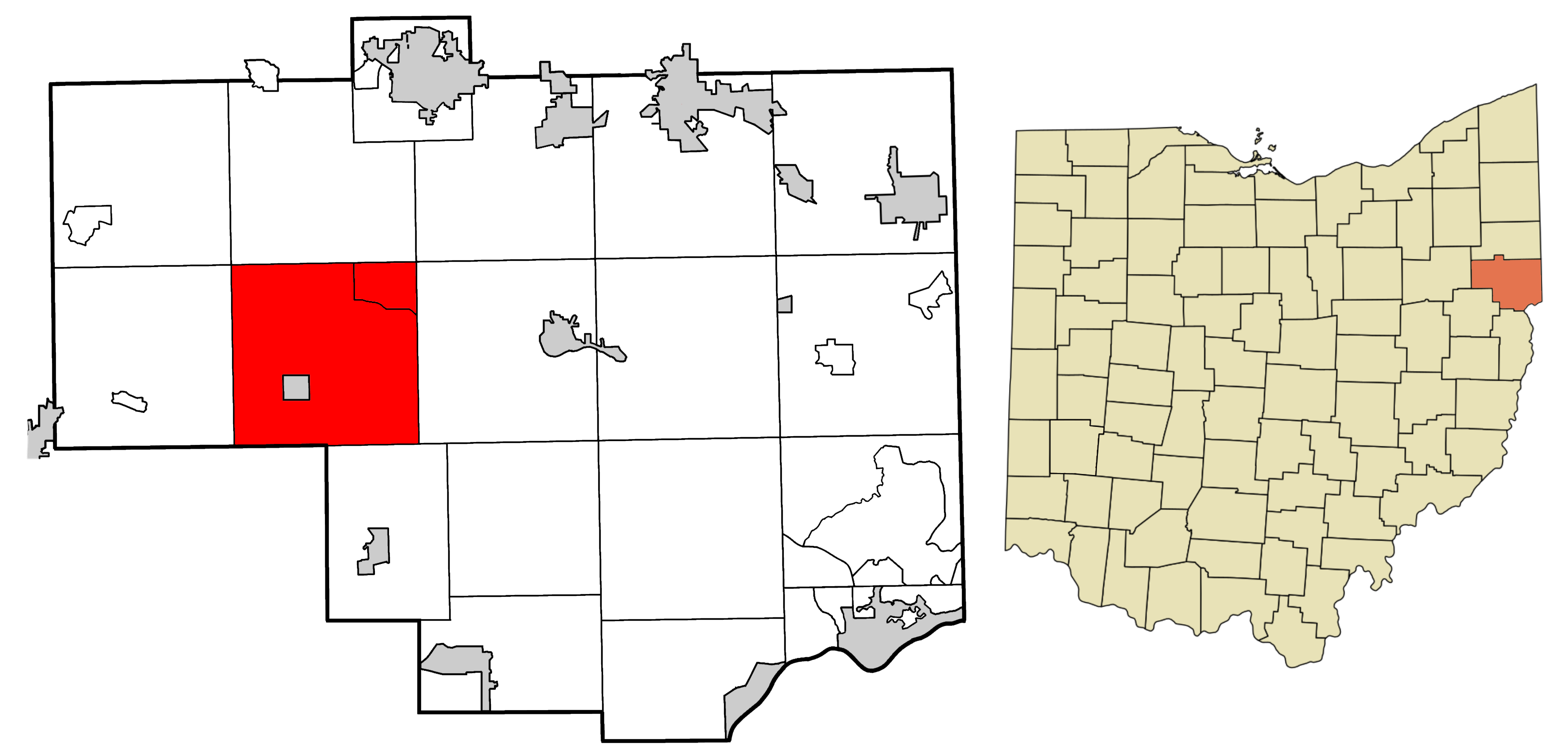
- Location of Hanover Township in Columbiana County
- Coordinates: 40°45′51″N 80°54′42″W
- Country: United States
- State: Ohio
- County: Columbiana

Area
  - Total: 36.4 sq mi (94.2 km^{2})
  - Land: 35.8 sq mi (92.7 km^{2})
  - Water: 0.54 sq mi (1.4 km^{2})
- Elevation: 1,230 ft (375 m)

Population (2020)
  - Total: 3,459
  - Density: 96.6/sq mi (37.3/km^{2})
- Time zone: UTC-5 (Eastern (EST))
  - Summer (DST): UTC-4 (EDT)
- FIPS code: 39-33264
- GNIS feature ID: 1085895
- Website: https://www.hanovertownshipohio.com/

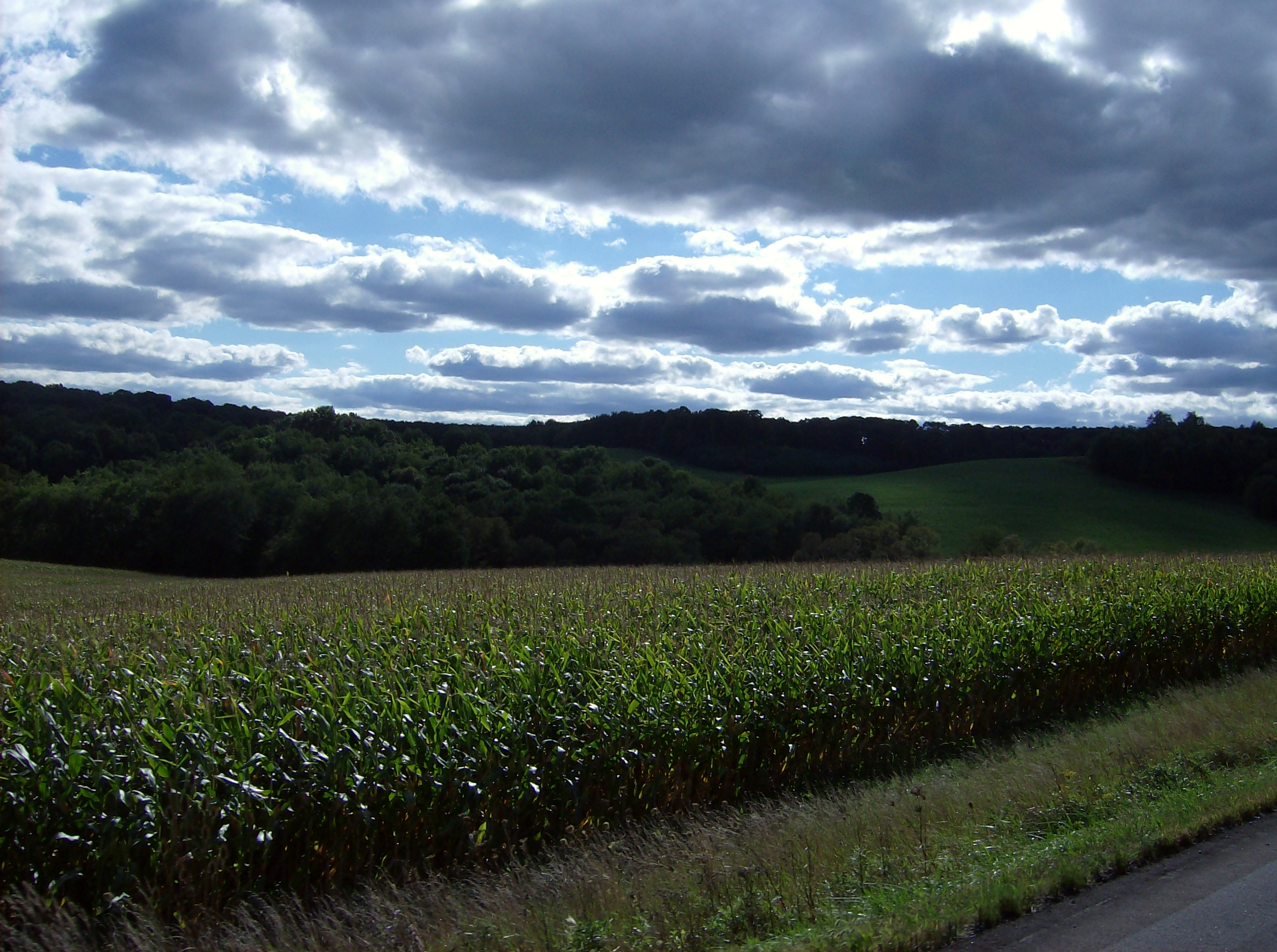
Countryside of Hanover Township

Hanover Township is one of the eighteen townships of Columbiana County, Ohio, United States. The 2020 census reported 3,459 people living in the township.

Hanover Township is home to the United Local School District campus.

== Geography ==
Located in the western part of the county, it borders the following townships:

- Butler Township - north
- Salem Township - northeast corner
- Center Township - east
- Franklin Township - southeast
- East Township, Carroll County - southwest
- West Township - west
- Knox Township - northwest corner

One village and two unincorporated communities are located in Hanover Township:

- The village of Hanoverton, in the south
- The unincorporated community of Kensington, in the southwest
- The unincorporated community of Guilford, in the northeast

== Name and history ==
Historical population
Census	Pop.	Note	%±
1980	3,288		—
1990	3,467		5.4%
2000	3,749		8.1%
2010	3,704		−1.2%
2020	3,459		−6.6%

Statewide, other Hanover townships are located in Butler, Ashland, and Licking counties. The township was organized in 1806.

== Government ==
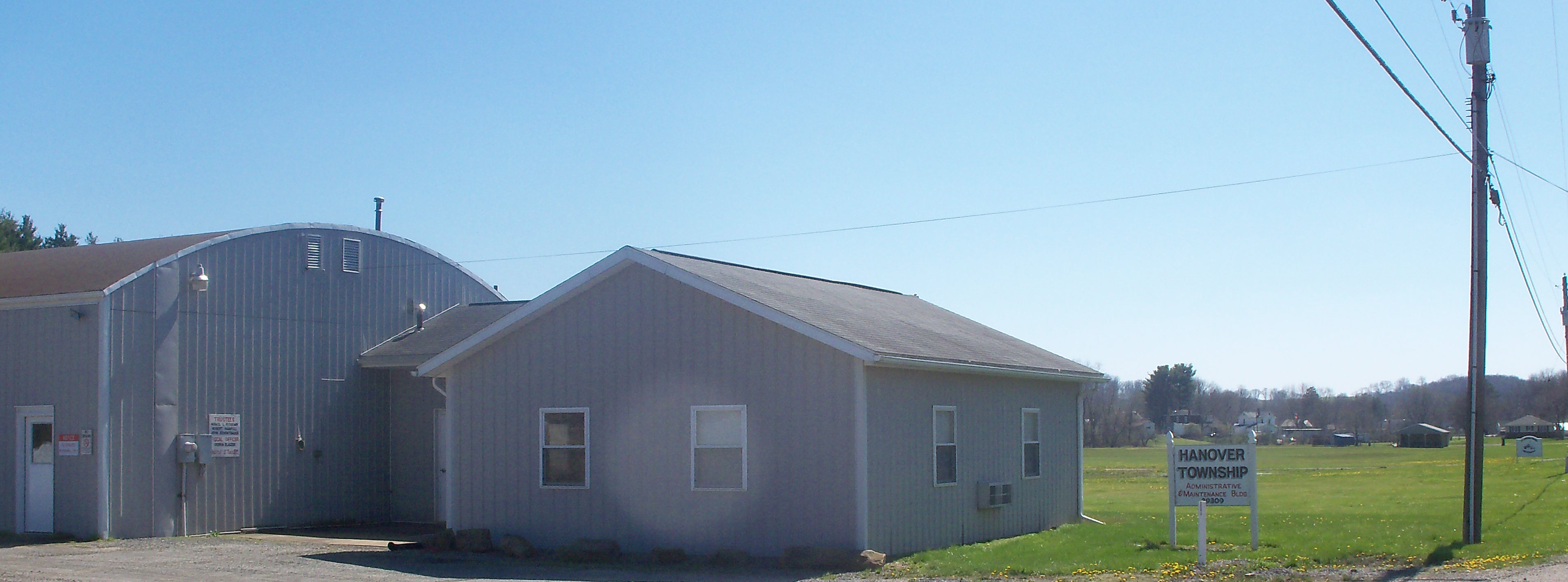
Town hall

The township, governed by a three-member board of trustees, who are elected in November of odd-numbered years to a four-year term beginning on the following January 1. Two are elected in the year after the presidential election and one is elected in the year before it. There is also an elected township fiscal officer, who serves a four-year term beginning on April 1 of the year after the election, which is held in November of the year before the presidential election. Vacancies in the fiscal officership or on the board of trustees are filled by the remaining trustees.

=== Township Trustees ===
- Jason T. Raymond, Chairman
- John S. Zehentbauer, Vice Chairman
- Robert L. Manfull

=== Fiscal Officer ===
- Debra J. Blazer

== Infrastructure ==
The township has many notable and famous pieces of infrastructure across it. Three main highways include Ohio State Route 9, Ohio State Route 172, and U.S. Route 30. The Hanoverton Canal Town District, a part of the Sandy and Beaver Canal, is part of the National Register of Historic Places. Another piece of notable infrastructure includes the Tennessee Gas Pipeline, which runs from south to north through the township.
