= East Rochester, Ohio =

- Census-designated place
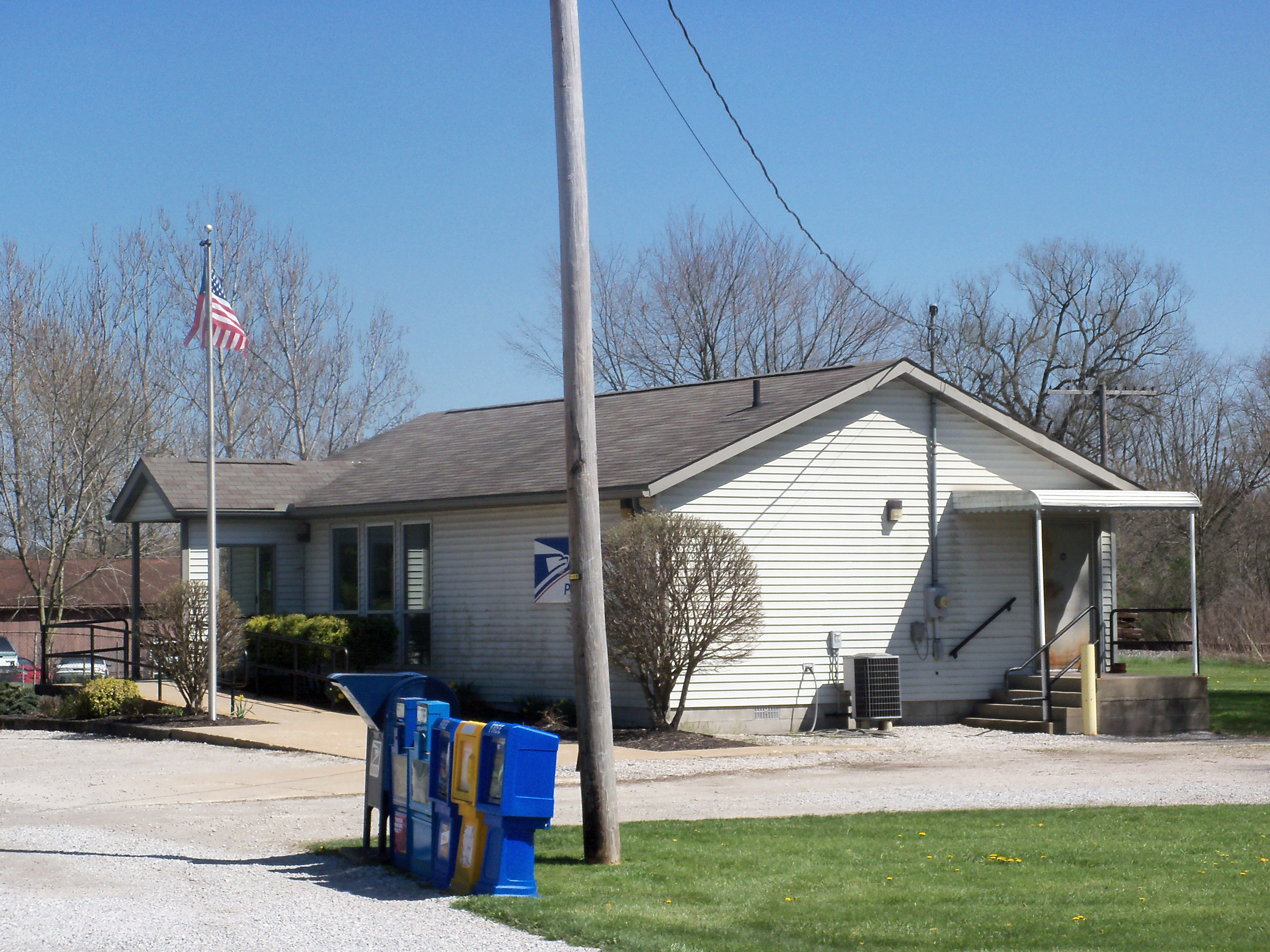
- East Rochester Post Office

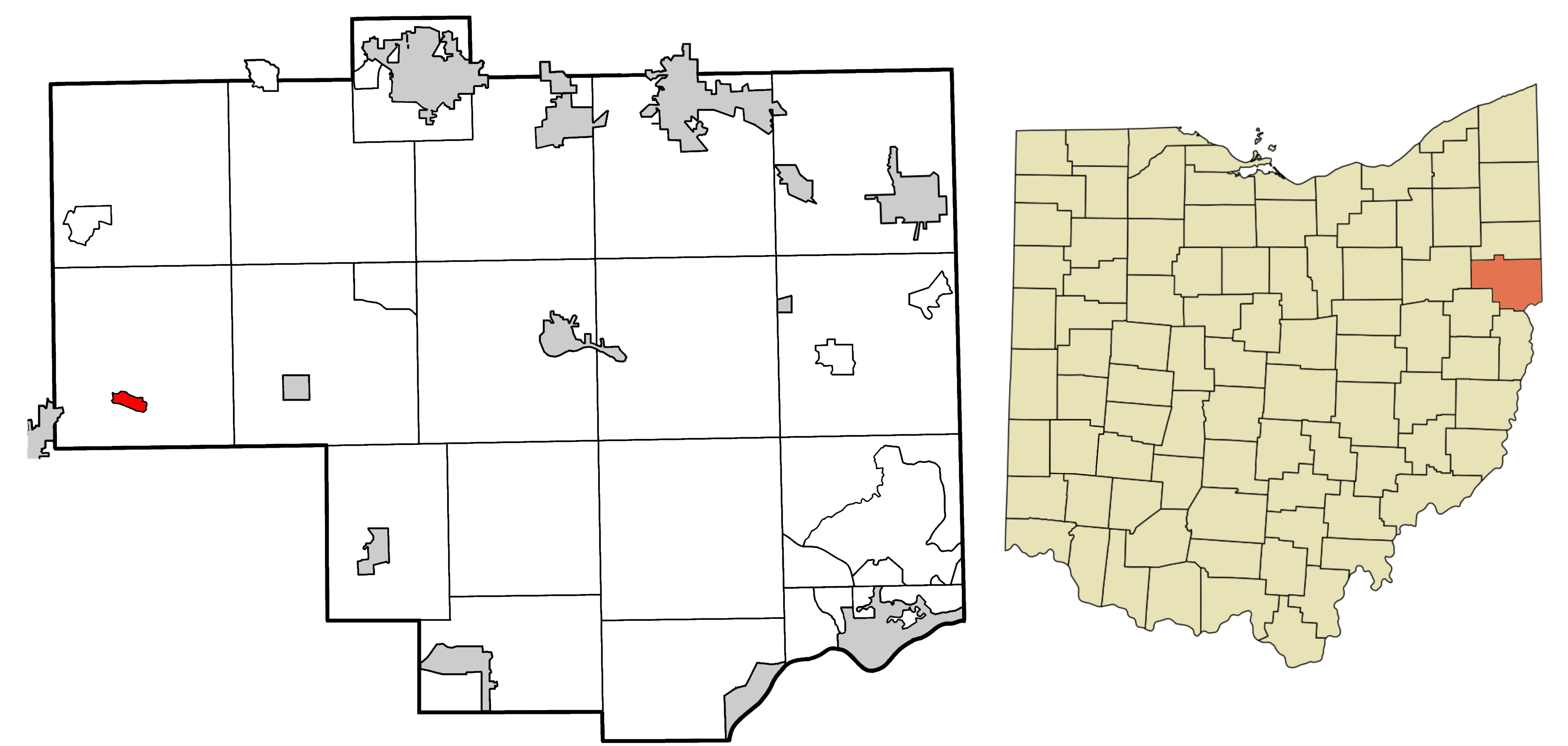
- Location of East Rochester in Columbiana County, Ohio.

- Location within Ohio Location within the United States
- Coordinates: 40°45′02″N 81°02′28″W
- Country: United States
- State: Ohio
- County: Columbiana
- Township: West

Area
  - Total: 0.42 sq mi (1.10 km^{2})
  - Land: 0.42 sq mi (1.10 km^{2})
  - Water: 0 sq mi (0.00 km^{2})
- Elevation: 1,079 ft (329 m)

Population (2020)
  - Total: 224
  - Density: 525.6/sq mi (202.93/km^{2})
- Time zone: UTC-5 (Eastern (EST))
  - Summer (DST): UTC-4 (EDT)
- ZIP code: 44625
- Area codes: 330, 234
- FIPS code: 39-24024
- GNIS feature ID: 2628889
- School District: Minerva Local School District

East Rochester is an unincorporated community and census-designated place in southern West Township, Columbiana County, Ohio, United States. The population was 224 as of the 2020 census. It lies along U.S. Route 30 about 20 miles (32 km) east of Canton, and has a post office with the ZIP code 44625.

== History ==
Historical population
Census	Pop.	Note	%±
2010	231		—
2020	224		−3.0%
U.S. Decennial Census

East Rochester was originally known officially as "Rochester", and under the latter name was platted in 1834. The Cleveland and Pittsburgh Railroad was built through the settlement in 1852. When the post office was established, the name "East Rochester" was adopted to avoid repetition with another Rochester, Ohio. A post office called East Rochester has been in operation since 1840.

== Geography ==
East Rochester is located along U.S. Route 30, 32 miles (51 km) northwest of East Liverpool and 22 miles (35 km) east of Canton. The nearest incorporated community is Minerva, 4 miles (6 km) to the west.

According to the U.S. Census Bureau, the East Rochester CDP has an area of 0.42 square miles (1.1 km^{2}). It is in the valley of Sandy Creek, which flows west to the Tuscarawas River, a tributary of the Ohio River.

== Education ==
Children in East Rochester are served by the public Minerva Local School District, which includes one elementary school, one middle school, and Minerva High School.
