= Nimishillen =

Nimishillen may refer to:

- Nimishillen Creek
- Nimishillen Township, Stark County, Ohio
