= Hostetter Inn =

- U.S. National Register of Historic Places
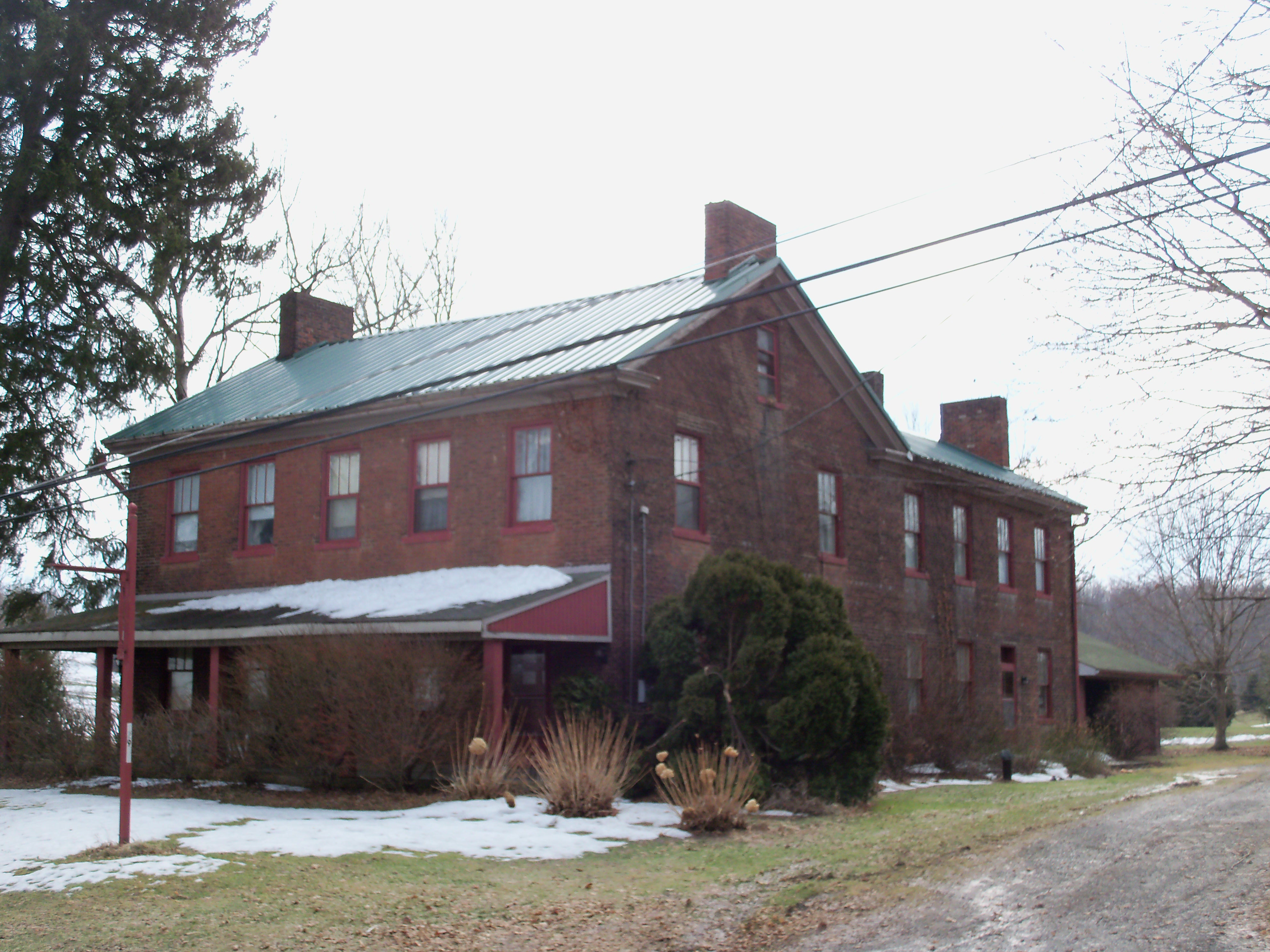
- Front and western side

- Location within Ohio Location within the United States
- Location: 32901 State Route 172 northwest of Lisbon, Ohio
- Coordinates: 40°47′34″N 80°52′50″W
- Area: Less than 1 acre (0.40 ha)
- Built: 1832
- NRHP reference No.: 80002965
- Added to NRHP: September 27, 1980

The Hostetter Inn is a historic lodging facility located outside the village of Lisbon, Ohio, United States. Constructed in the early 1830s, it has been designated a historic site.

The inn is a brick building set on a foundation of limestone; an asphalt roof covers the building, and additional elements of wood are also present. It is a simple structure without a standard architectural style. Five spaces for windows and doorways are present on each of the facade's two stories, while the ends rise to gables. Inside, many original details are present, including the fluting on the pilasters of the fireplace mantels, the oven in the fireplace and the delicate wooden molding in the kitchen, and the antique latches and locks on the doors. These elements are more significant than the little-changed exterior, as Ohio historic preservationists have few comparable opportunities to examine period interiors.

Built in 1832, the Hostetter Inn takes its name from the original owners, a family named Hostetter, who were the proprietors until after the turn of the twentieth century. Throughout its history, the inn has experienced remarkably few changes; aside from miniature modifications on the exterior, nothing of the building's appearance has changed since its construction. As a result, and because most of the area's old houses have experienced major modifications, the old inn has become a highly significant part of the local built environment. Accordingly, in 1980, the inn was listed on the National Register of Historic Places; it qualified both because of its architecture and its place in local history, being deemed important as a major part of the commercial life of Hanover Township and the community of Guilford.
