= Guilford Lake, Ohio =

- Census-designated place
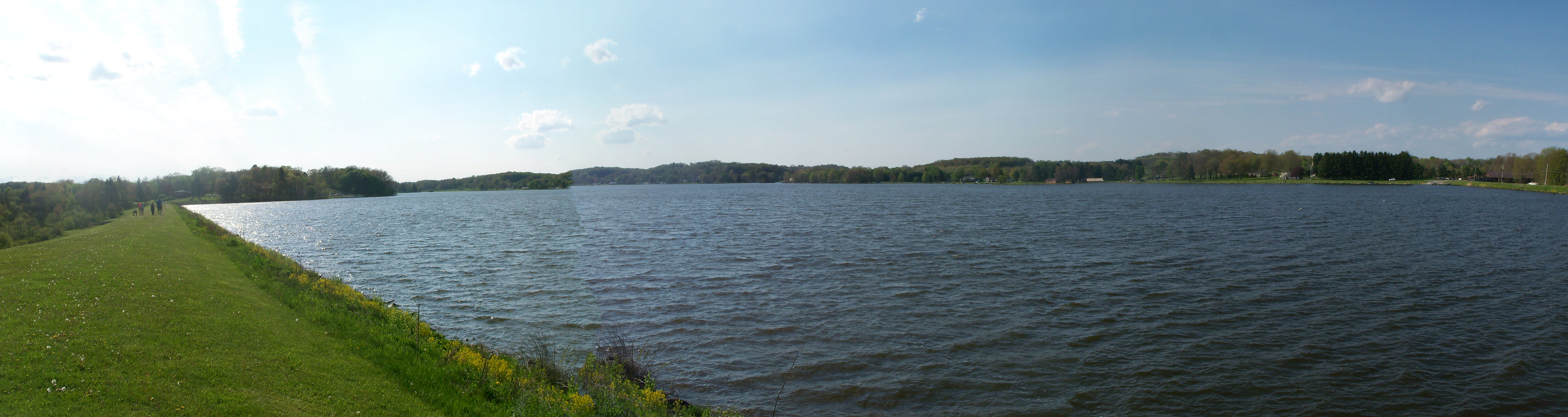
- Guilford Lake, from which the community takes its name.

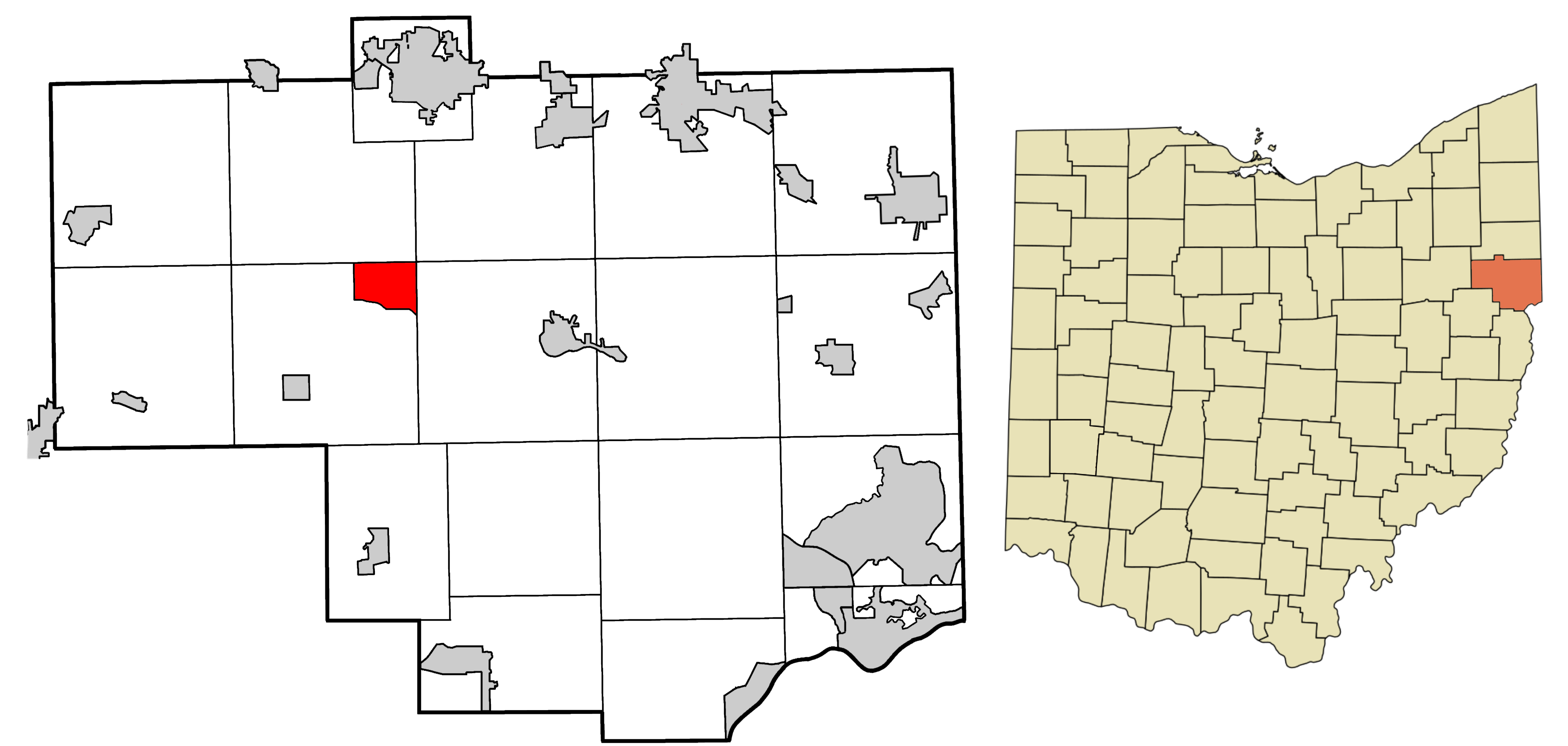
- Location of Guilford Lake in Columbiana County and in the State of Ohio

- Location within Ohio Location within the United States
- Country: United States
- State: Ohio
- County: Columbiana
- Township: Hanover

Area
  - Total: 2.90 sq mi (7.51 km^{2})
  - Land: 2.37 sq mi (6.13 km^{2})
  - Water: 0.53 sq mi (1.38 km^{2})
- Elevation: 1,132 ft (345 m)

Population (2020)
  - Total: 1,188
  - Density: 502.0/sq mi (193.81/km^{2})
- Time zone: UTC-5 (Eastern (EST))
  - Summer (DST): UTC-4 (EDT)
- ZIP code: 44423, 44432
- Area codes: 330, 234
- FIPS code: 39-32680
- GNIS Feature ID: 2805292
- School District: United Local School District

Guilford Lake is an unincorporated community and census-designated place in Hanover Township, Columbiana County, Ohio, United States. It surrounds the eponymous Guilford Lake reservoir. The population was 1,188 at the 2020 census.

== History ==
Historical population
Census	Pop.	Note	%±
2020	1,188		—
U.S. Decennial Census

Guilford Lake was constructed as a canal feeder reservoir for the Sandy and Beaver Canal in 1834. It took its name from Edward H. Gill, chief engineer of the canal company. When the canal era ended, local farmers breached the dam, drained the lake, and used the fertile lake bottom for farm land. In 1932, a new dam was completed and the land surrounding it was designated a state park in 1949. The community was first listed as a CDP for the 2020 census.

== Education ==
Children in Guilford Lake are served by the public United Local School District, which includes one elementary school, one middle school, and United High School.
