= Sandy Creek (Ohio) =

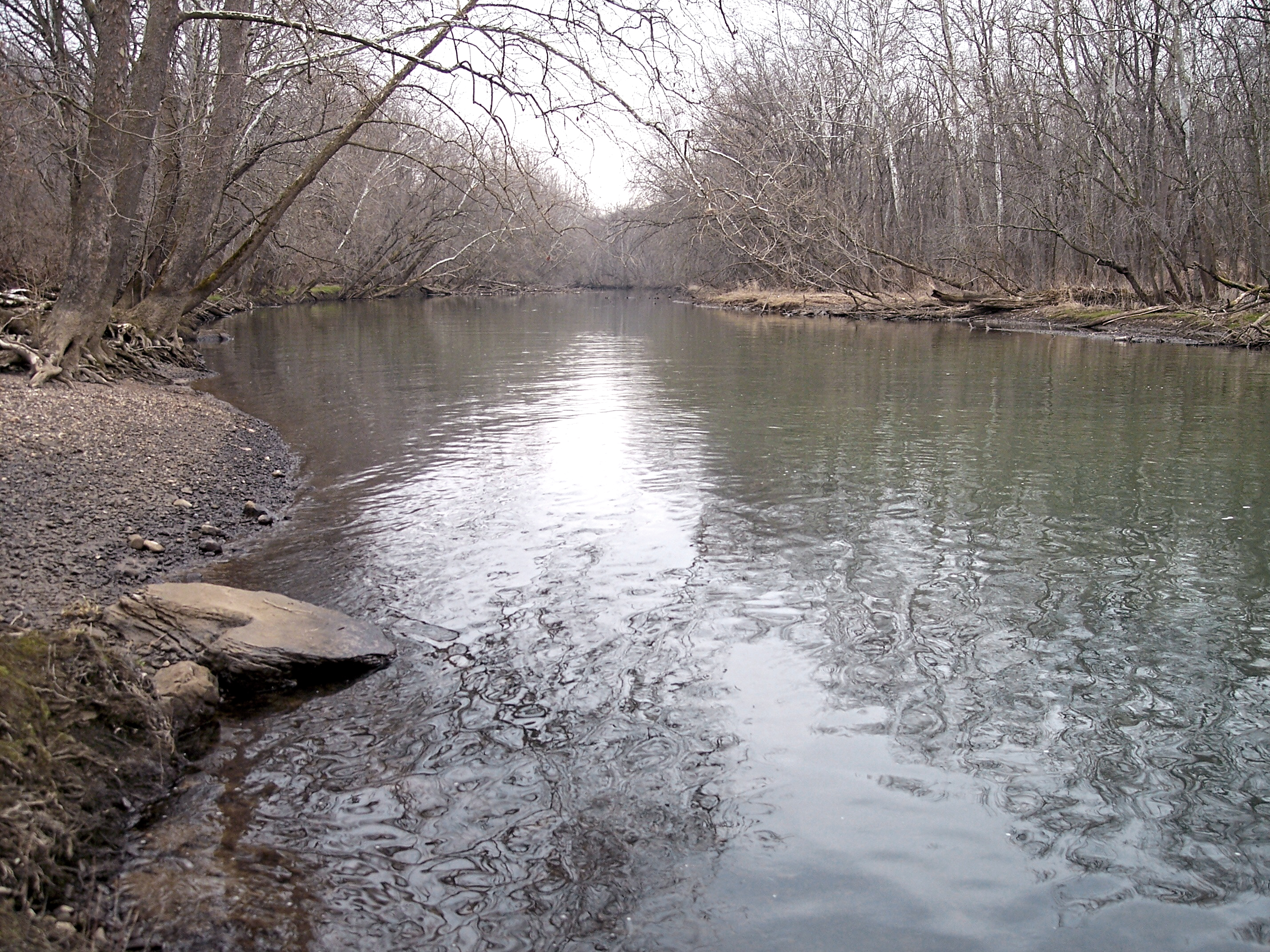
- Sandy Creek near its mouth, downstream of Bolivar Dam in 2006

- Location of the mouth of Sandy Creek

Location
- Country: United States
- State: Ohio

Physical characteristics
- Source
  - location: Hanover Township, Columbiana County
  - coordinates: 40°46′19″N 80°54′09″W
  - elevation: 1,299 ft (396 m)
- Mouth: Tuscarawas River
  - location: Bethlehem Township, Stark County
  - coordinates: 40°39′28″N 81°26′14″W
  - elevation: 887 ft (270 m)
- Length: 41.3 mi (66.5 km)
- Basin size: 504 mi^{2} (1,310 km^{2})
- Discharge
  - location: Waynesburg
  - average: 278 cu ft/s (7.9 m^{3}/s)
  - minimum: 6.9 cu ft/s (0.20 m^{3}/s)
  - maximum: 15,000 cu ft/s (420 m^{3}/s)

Basin features
- Tributaries
  - left: Still Fork
  - right: Nimishillen Creek

Sandy Creek is a tributary of the Tuscarawas River, 41.3 miles (66.5 km) long, in northeastern Ohio. Via the Tuscarawas, Muskingum and Ohio Rivers, it is part of the watershed of the Mississippi River, draining an area of 503 square miles (1,300 km^{2}).

== Geography ==
Sandy Creek rises in Hanover Township, approximately two miles (3.2 km) northeast of Hanoverton in western Columbiana County and flows generally west-southwestwardly through northwestern Carroll County, southeastern Stark County and northeastern Tuscarawas County, past the communities of Kensington, Minerva, Malvern, Waynesburg and Magnolia. It joins the Tuscarawas River from the east in Bethlehem Township in Stark County, approximately one mile (1.6 km) northeast of Bolivar. At Minerva, it collects the Still Fork. At Waynesburg, it collects a short stream known as Little Sandy Creek. In Sandyville, Tuscarawas County it collects Nimishillen Creek, which drains the city of Canton.

A dry dam, Bolivar Dam, constructed by the United States Army Corps of Engineers, spans the creek near its mouth.

== Flow rate ==
At the United States Geological Survey's stream gauge in Waynesburg, the annual mean flow of the river between 1939 and 2005 was 278 cubic feet per second (7.9 m^{3}/s). The highest recorded flow during the period was 15,000 cu ft/s (420 m^{3}/s) on January 22, 1959. The lowest recorded flow was 6.9 cu ft/s (0.20 m^{3}/s) on an unspecified date.

== Variant names ==
According to the Geographic Names Information System, Sandy Creek has also been known historically as:

- Big Sandy Creek
- Big Sandy River
- Elks Eye Creek
- Lamanshicolas Creek
- Lamenshikola Creek

== See also ==
- List of rivers of Ohio
- Sandy Creek (Texas): July 2025 Central Texas floods
