= Guilford Lake State Park =

Lakeside state park in Ohio

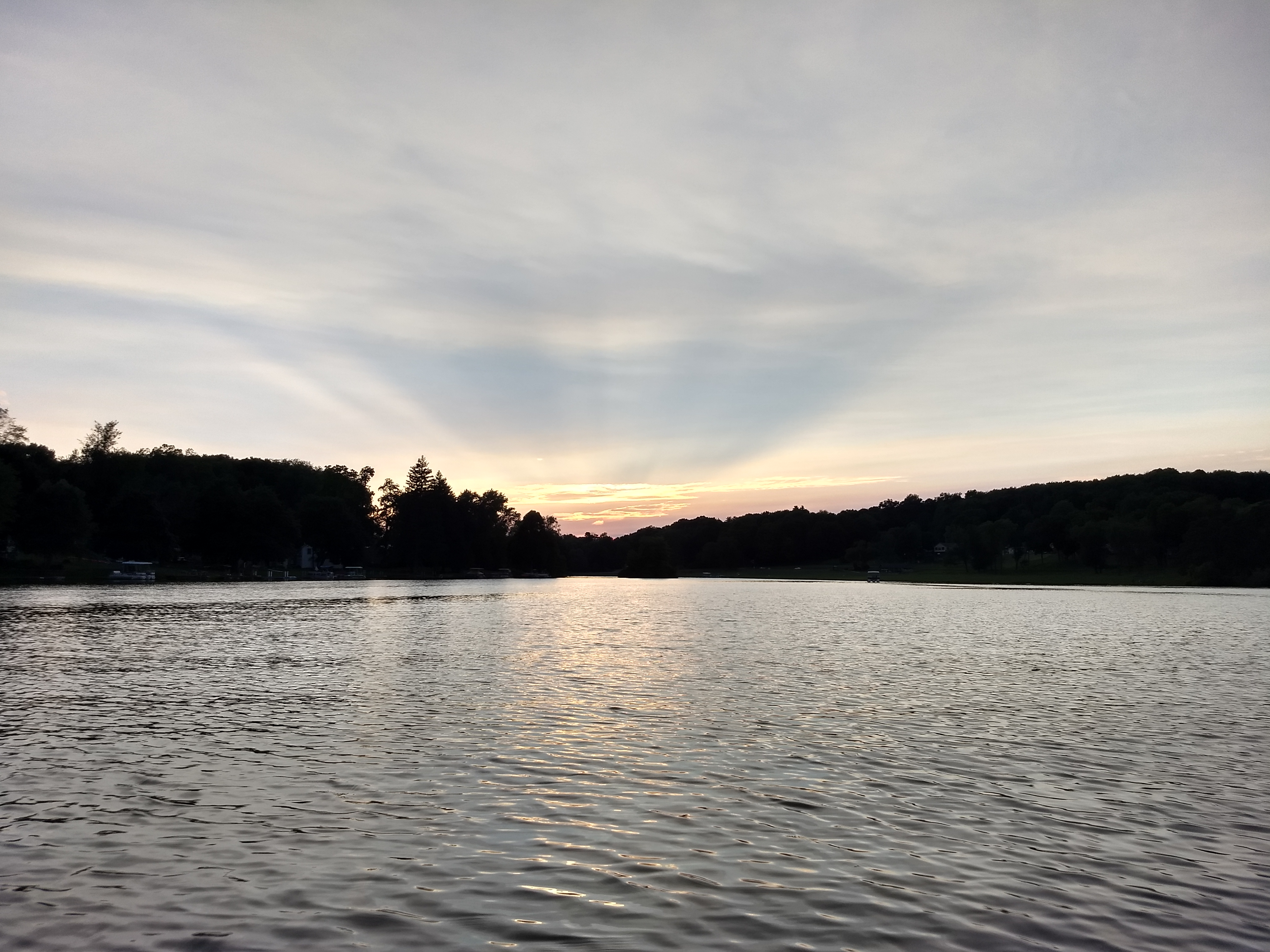
- View over Guilford Lake

- Location within Ohio
- Location: Columbiana County, Ohio
- Coordinates: 40°47′42″N 80°52′17″W

Guilford Lake State Park is an Ohio state park in the unincorporated community of Guilford Lake, Ohio. The site of a former pine plantation, it offers lake access for fishing, boating, and beach activities as well picnics and campsites. Guilford Lake was established by construction of a dam.

== History ==
Guildford Lake was constructed as a "canal feeder" for the Sandy and Beaver Canal in the 1830s. Guilford Lake was named for Edward H. Gill, a canal engineer responsible for the lake's creation.

Development towards a state park around the area of the dam began in July 1925, when a motion to purchase the land was approved; after an extended period of negotiation, the purchase was approved in 1927, with work set to begin in Spring and the deeds finalized later that year. By 1929 the project was already struggling with budget issues that would plague it over the next several years.

In January 1931, it was announced to be one of six Ohio lakes that would be developed into a state park, with an initial proposed budget of $5,000 (equivalent to $105,853 in 2025). Funds for 731 acres of land, a dam, a road, and a bridge were originally requested at $131,800 over two years. This was then reduced to $70,000 before being placed up for vote, further reduced to $20,000 for land and $5,000 for a retaining wall, before having the funds for land removed from the budget entirely after approval by the Ohio state senate. However, by June, Ohio politicians successfully pushed for a $37,500 budget for land and repairs on a lake wall, which was approved.

Guilford Lake was officially designated as a State Park in 1949 with the passing of the bill that created the Ohio Department of Natural Resources and the Ohio State Park system in general.

== Activities ==
The Ohio State Park offers fishing, picnic areas, a campsite with swimming and a playground, boat ramps, a dock, a short walking trail, bird watching, and paddleboat rentals. The small area was part of a pine plantation. Winter activities include ice skating and ice fishing. Nature programming is offered during the summer. A map of the area park shows several parking areas and Firestone / Yeagley Wildlife Area nearby. The lake is 396 acres (160 ha) in surface area, while the park itself is 489 acres (198 ha).

A grill and banquet center at the state park repoened in 2025.

== Dam ==
Guilford Lake Dam was first constructed in the mid-19th century, and has gone through major renovations multiple times since it was constructed, including being completely reconstructed in 1933. It is 35 feet (11 m) high, 3,200 feet (980 m) long, and has a volume of 104,000 cubic yards (80,000 m^{3}). As of 2026 the dam is being rehabilitated, which will result in extremely low water levels for the year.

== See also ==
- List of protected areas of Ohio
- List of lakes in Ohio
