= Still Fork =

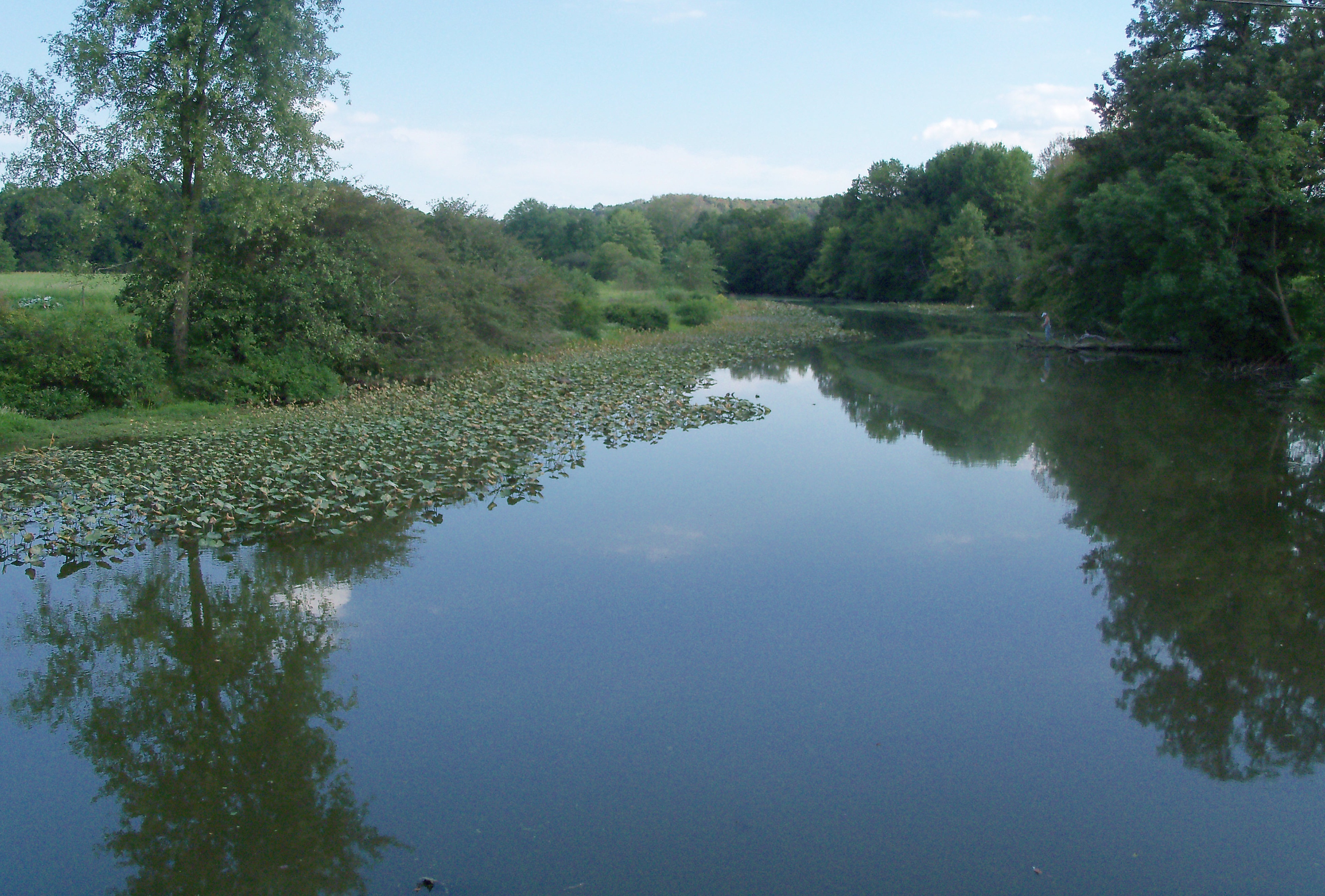
- From Arrow Road Bridge

Location
- Country: United States
- State: Ohio
- Region: Carroll County, Ohio

Physical characteristics
- Source
  - location: Fox Township, Carroll County
  - coordinates: 40°37′10″N 80°56′08″W
  - elevation: 1,180 ft (360 m)
- Mouth: Sandy Creek
  - location: Minerva, Carroll County
  - coordinates: 40°42′59″N 81°06′31″W
  - elevation: 1,027 ft (313 m)
- Length: 16.1 mi (25.9 km)
- Basin size: 71.4 mi^{2} (185 km^{2})

Still Fork is a tributary of the Sandy Creek, 16.1 miles (26 km) long, in eastern Ohio in the United States. Via the Sandy Creek, Tuscarawas, Muskingum and Ohio Rivers, it is part of the watershed of the Mississippi River, draining an area of 71.4 square miles (185 km^{2}) in Carroll County, Ohio. The source is at 1,180 feet (360 m) and the mouth is at 1,027 feet (313 m)., with an average gradient of only 0.2%. From its source in eastern Carroll County the creek flows northwest through Fox, Washington, Augusta, and Brown Townships before reaching its mouth in Minerva, Ohio. The Ohi-Rail Corporation (OHIC) and Arbor road are situated in the creeks valley over most of its length.

Near Augusta the creek flows through a rural Amish community, and downstream of Ohio State Route 9 is the unincorporated community of Pattersonville. Mechanicstown and Norristown are the only other named communities in the watershed.

== Variant names ==
According to the Geographic Names Information System, Still Fork has had no other known names.

== Still Fork of Sandy Navigation Company ==
On February 15, 1837, the General Assembly of the state of Ohio enacted AN ACT to incorporate the Still Fork of Sandy Navigation Company. This act authorized seven named Carroll county men to form the company to “…locate, make, construct, and forever maintain, a navigable canal or slack-water navigation, commencing on the land of William Croxton, where the New Lisbon-Carrollton road crosses said Still Fork of Sandy, and thence with the general course of said stream, to intersect the Sandy and Beaver Canal, at the town of Pekin, in said county of Carroll…with the full power to emyloy [sic], as reservoirs or feeders, all streams or ponds over or near which such canal or slack-water navigation may pass.” The company was capitalized at $65,000 in $25 shares to be sold to individuals only. William Croxton's land was in section 11 of Washington Township, a short distance up Friday Creek from the main branch of Still Fork, and present day county road 71 was the road between Carrollton and Lisbon.

== Named tributaries ==
Name	Flows into	Source elevation	Mouth elevation	Mouth Location Source Location	Length	Drainage area
Muddy Fork	Still Fork	1,230 ft (375 m)	1,030 ft (314 m)	40°42′11″N 81°05′04″W; 40°42′25″N 80°56′31″W	8.3 mi (13 km)	17.1 sq mi (44 km^{2})
Wholebark Run	Still Fork	1,074 ft (327 m)	1,034 ft (315 m)	40°41′26″N 81°03′26″W; 40°41′20″N 81°05′40″W	1.6 mi (3 km)	1.36 sq mi (4 km^{2})
Pumpkin Run	Still Fork	1,070 ft (326 m)	1,035 ft (315 m)	40°40′45″N 81°03′10″W; 40°40′27″N 81°05′16″W	1.9 mi (3 km)	2.13 sq mi (6 km^{2})
Reeds Run	Still Fork	1,180 ft (360 m)	1,036 ft (316 m)	40°40′11″N 81°02′45″W; 40°41′09″N 80°57′29″W	5 mi (8 km)	6.35 sq mi (16 km^{2})
Pipes Fork	Still Fork	1,100 ft (335 m)	1,044 ft (318 m)	40°39′02″N 81°01′20″W; 40°35′53″N 81°01′35″W	4.2 mi (7 km)	8.04 sq mi (21 km^{2})
Friday Creek	Still Fork	1,140 ft (347 m)	1,052 ft (321 m)	40°33′9″N 81°4′3″W; 40°34′45″N 81°01′20″W	4.4 mi (7 km)	9.22 sq mi (24 km^{2})

== See also ==
- List of rivers of Ohio
