= Pattersonville, Ohio =

Unincorporated community in Ohio, U.S.

Coordinates: 40°40′28″N 81°02′54″W

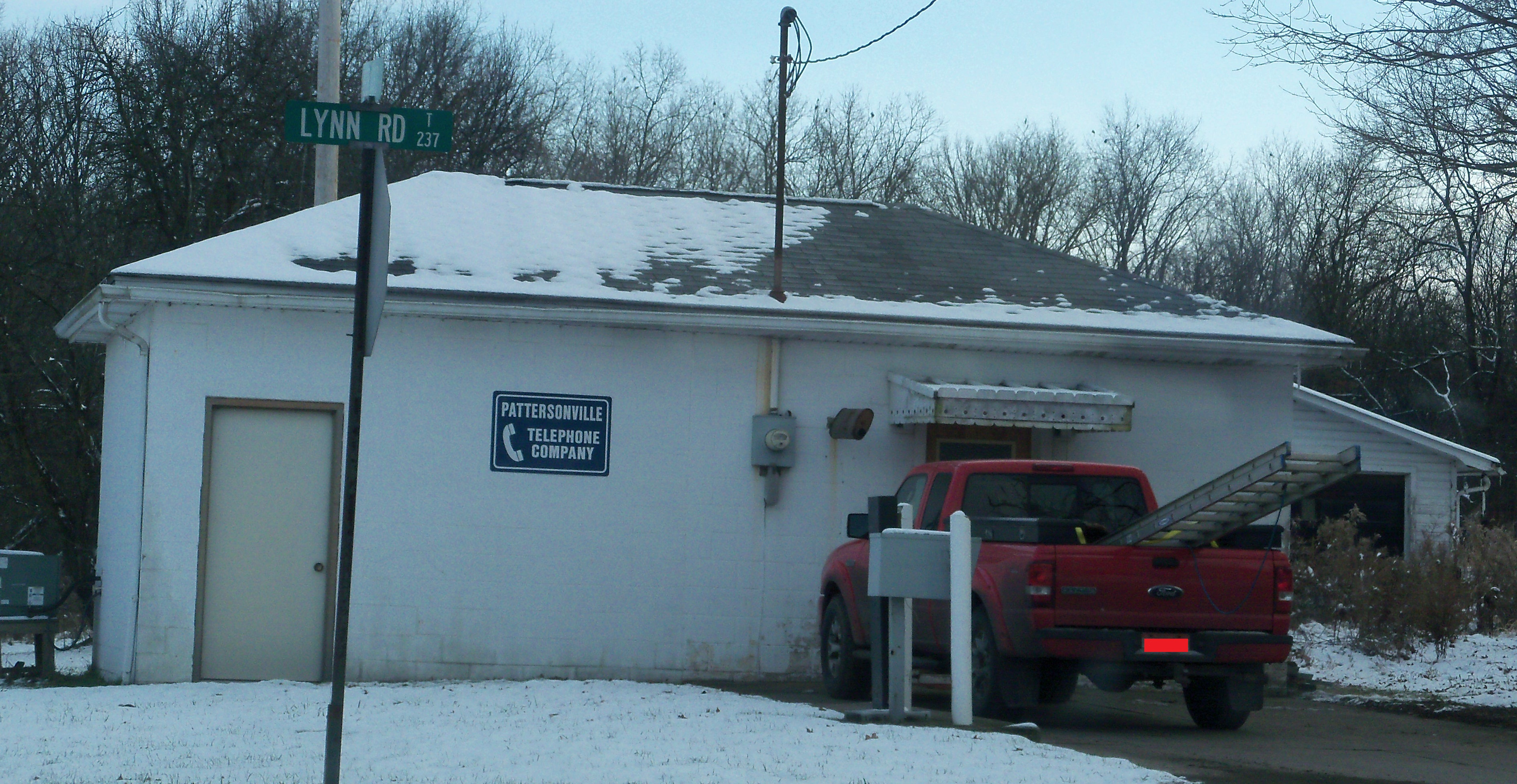
The Business District

Pattersonville is an unincorporated community in Augusta Township, Carroll County, Ohio, United States. The community is part of the Canton–Massillon Metropolitan Statistical Area. The community is serviced by the Minerva, Ohio post office, ZIP code 44657 . It is located on the Still Fork creek and the Ohi-Rail Corporation (OHIC) railroad.

== History ==
Pattersonville was platted November 15, 1907 by George S. Patterson in section 21 of township 15 in the fifth range.

== Education ==
Students attend the Carrollton Exempted Village School District.
