= East Sparta, Ohio =

- Village
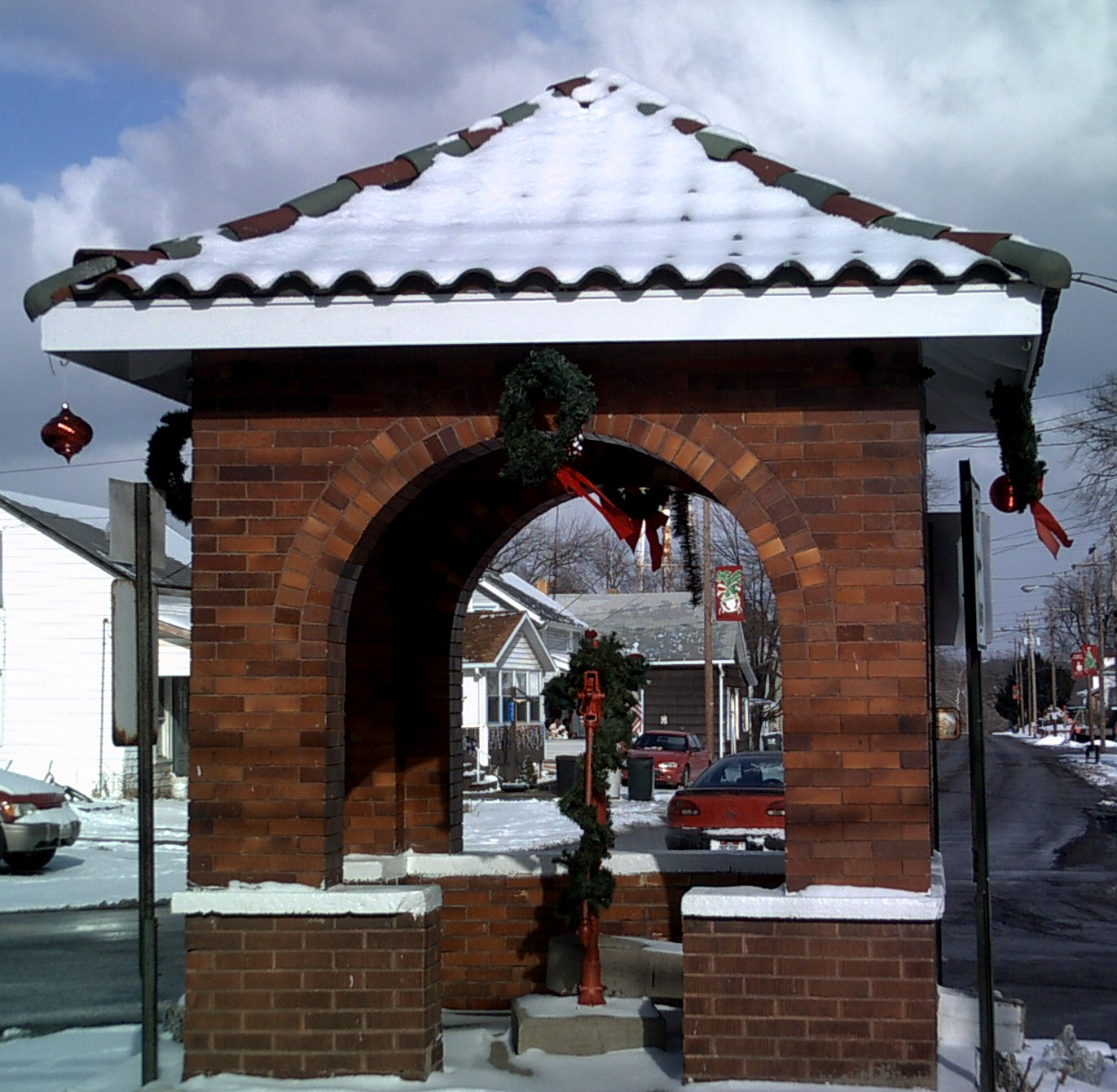
- The Town Pump at Christmas time

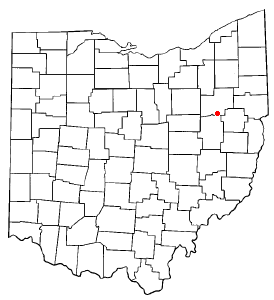
- Location of East Sparta, Ohio

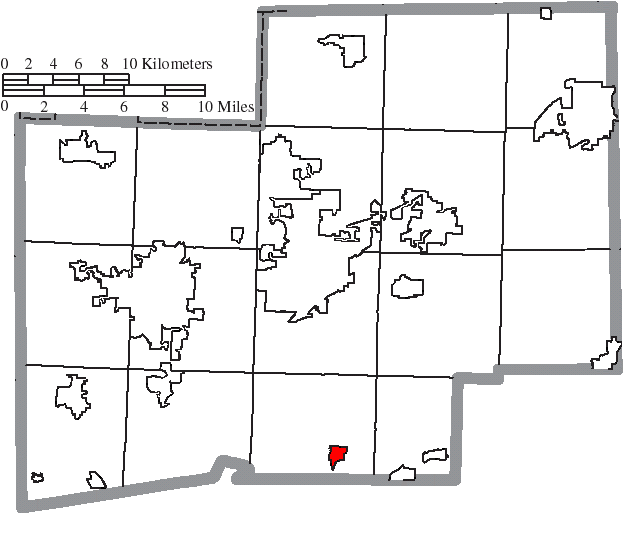
- Location of East Sparta in Stark County
- Coordinates: 40°39′45″N 81°22′20″W
- Country: United States
- State: Ohio
- County: Stark
- Township: Pike
- Established: March 22, 1815

Area
  - Total: 1.82 sq mi (4.71 km^{2})
  - Land: 1.82 sq mi (4.71 km^{2})
  - Water: 0 sq mi (0.00 km^{2})
- Elevation: 1,043 ft (318 m)

Population (2020)
  - Total: 749
  - Estimate (2023): 743
  - Density: 411.5/sq mi (158.88/km^{2})
- Time zone: UTC-5 (Eastern (EST))
  - Summer (DST): UTC-4 (EDT)
- ZIP code: 44626
- Area code: 330
- FIPS code: 39-24052
- GNIS feature ID: 2398778
- Website: Village website

East Sparta is a village in southern Stark County, Ohio, United States. The population was 749 at the 2020 census. It is part of the Canton–Massillon metropolitan area.

== History ==
East Sparta was originally called Sparta, and under the latter name was laid out in 1815 and named after the ancient city of Sparta in Greece.

On June 3, 2015, East Sparta's 70-year-old water tower was dismantled. On July 28, 2017, East Sparta's Towne Pump Tavern built in 1909 burned down.

== Geography ==
East Sparta is located along Nimishillen Creek, a short distance north of the Tuscarawas County border.

According to the United States Census Bureau, the village has a total area of 1.68 square miles (4.35 km^{2}), all land.

== Demographics ==
Historical population
Census	Pop.	Note	%±
1940	690		—
1950	811		17.5%
1960	961		18.5%
1970	959		−0.2%
1980	868		−9.5%
1990	771		−11.2%
2000	806		4.5%
2010	819		1.6%
2020	749		−8.5%
2023 (est.)	743	▼	−0.8%
U.S. Decennial Census

=== 2010 census ===
As of the census of 2010, there were 819 people, 328 households, and 229 families living in the village. The population density was 487.5 inhabitants per square mile (188.2/km^{2}). There were 349 housing units at an average density of 207.7 per square mile (80.2/km^{2}). The racial makeup of the village was 99.3% White, 0.2% African American, and 0.5% from two or more races. Hispanic or Latino of any race were 0.9% of the population.

There were 328 households, of which 29.6% had children under the age of 18 living with them, 55.5% were married couples living together, 9.1% had a female householder with no husband present, 5.2% had a male householder with no wife present, and 30.2% were non-families. 24.7% of all households were made up of individuals, and 12.1% had someone living alone who was 65 years of age or older. The average household size was 2.50 and the average family size was 2.95.

The median age in the village was 42.3 years. 24.3% of residents were under the age of 18; 7% were between the ages of 18 and 24; 22.4% were from 25 to 44; 28.7% were from 45 to 64; and 17.6% were 65 years of age or older. The gender makeup of the village was 49.7% male and 50.3% female.

=== 2000 census ===
As of the census of 2000, there were 806 people, 315 households, and 242 families living in the village. The population density was 1,344.6 inhabitants per square mile (519.2/km^{2}). There were 341 housing units at an average density of 568.9 per square mile (219.7/km^{2}). The racial makeup of the village was 98.64% White, 0.25% African American, 0.37% Native American, and 0.74% from two or more races.

There were 315 households, out of which 34.3% had children under the age of 18 living with them, 64.4% were married couples living together, 8.9% had a female householder with no husband present, and 22.9% were non-families. 19.7% of all households were made up of individuals, and 9.8% had someone living alone who was 65 years of age or older. The average household size was 2.56 and the average family size was 2.89.

In the village, the population was spread out, with 24.6% under the age of 18, 6.5% from 18 to 24, 29.0% from 25 to 44, 22.1% from 45 to 64, and 17.9% who were 65 years of age or older. The median age was 39 years. For every 100 females there were 95.2 males. For every 100 females age 18 and over, there were 90.0 males.

The median income for a household in the village was $40,208, and the median income for a family was $41,964. Males had a median income of $29,267 versus $21,354 for females. The per capita income for the village was $18,017. About 4.7% of families and 5.3% of the population were below the poverty line, including 4.0% of those under age 18 and 5.7% of those age 65 or over.
