= Phil Davison =

American politician

Deputy Mayor of Minerva
- In office 2001–2013

Member of Minerva City Council
- In office 1997–2013

Personal details
- Born: Philip Lee Davison; July 1, 1971 (age 55) Minerva, Ohio, U.S.
- Party: Republican
- Education: University of Akron (BA, MPA)

Philip Lee Davison (born July 1, 1971) is an American politician, public speaker, and Internet celebrity. He is a former councilman and deputy mayor for the village of Minerva, Ohio, who became an internet celebrity due to the aggressive and passionate manner of speaking he employed while unsuccessfully seeking the Republican Party nomination for the office of the Stark County treasurer in September 2010.

== Early life and education ==
A native of Minerva, Davison graduated from Minerva High School in 1989. He earned a Bachelor of Arts degree in history and sociology from the University of Akron, followed by a Masters in Public Administration and Communication.

== Career ==
In 1995, Davison ran unsuccessfully for mayor of Minerva. In 1996, he ran unsuccessfully for clerk of courts, and also lost a bid for county commissioner in 2000. Davison first won election to the Minerva Village council in 1997. He was re-elected to four additional four-year terms, and was appointed Deputy Mayor. He decided not to seek re-election in 2013, which would have been his first election since his 2010 speech went viral.

Until 2009, he was employed as a bailiff for Judge Charles Brown of the Stark County Court of Common Pleas.

=== 2010 speech and aftermath ===
During a September 8, 2010 meeting of the Stark County Republican Party at Malone University, Davison delivered a six-minute speech expressing his interest in the party's nomination for County Treasurer. Though Davison lost the nomination to North Canton finance director Alexander Zumbar, Huffington Post citizen journalist Martin Olson's recording of Davison's speech went viral upon its posting on YouTube. By October 2011, YouTube users had viewed the video nearly 2.6 million times. Thereafter, Davison was flown to New York City for an appearance on Good Morning America and to Cleveland for an interview with Inside Edition. He was featured in major media outlets throughout the United States and the world. During his appearances, Davison discussed his astonishment with his instant celebrity, commenting on how he "woke up Thursday thinking it would be just another day" but then began receiving phone calls for media requests. In response to the public interest in his speech, Davison remarked:

If one person would get up and do something different, like go to a village council meeting or go talk to a neighbor about getting an improvement in water, an improvement in sewer, an improvement in fire protection or police protection, then I've done something worthwhile. I encourage everyone to run for office and go out and question the people who are representing you. I wish more people came to our meetings and said, 'Hey, what are you people doing up there?'

Six months later, Davison appeared on the March 8, 2011 episode of Comedy Central's Tosh.0 in a "web redemption" parody taped the previous November. In it, Davison made a mock presidential campaign announcement, foreshadowing an actual presidential campaign as unsuccessful candidate for the Boston Tea Party's 2012 presidential nomination.

He appeared in a 2013 television commercial for Volkswagen which aired during Super Bowl XLVII after a "teaser" version of the ad had run a few days prior. The ad featured Davison and other YouTube personalities appearing with reggae singer Jimmy Cliff. In October of that year, Davison's speech was ranked #1 on Washington Post writer Aaron Blake's list of "The 12 best political rants". Blake commented that Davison "will never be usurped in the rant department."

In January 2014, Davison topped CNN's ranking of "the best rants ever". In July of that year, he appeared on the ABC program 20/20 in a segment titled "Losing It".
