= G. W. Temple =

American politician

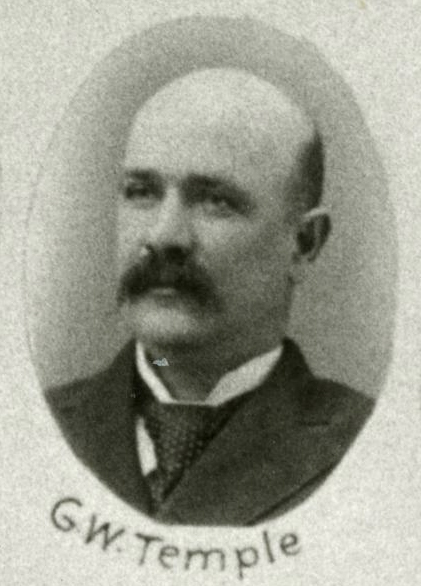
- Temple in 1895

Member of the Washington House of Representatives for the 3rd district
- In office 1893–1897

Personal details
- Born: June 23, 1847 Hanoverton, Ohio
- Died: 1917 Pomona, California?
- Resting place: Inglewood, California
- Party: Republican

George Washington Temple (1847–1917) was an American politician in the state of Washington. He served in the Washington House of Representatives from 1893 to 1897.

Temple grew up in Hanover, Ohio, where by 1863 he was a steamboat pilot. Between 1872 and 1880 he ran a business in Norborne, Missouri, and in October 1876, Temple married Jennie Florence Wilson (1853 – after 1923) in Ray County, Missouri. Their daughter Myrtle Lena (1877–1879) died as an infant. In 1883, Temple founded and presided over a bank in Sheldon, Missouri. In 1889, Jennie and he moved to Spokane, Washington. After his service in the legislator, he was postmaster of the Spokane office.

By 1902, the Temples had moved to Lewiston, Idaho, where George became a part owner in the Lewiston Mercantile Company and served as the first Exalted Ruler of the city's Elks Lodge (#896). In 1906, he moved to North Bend, Oregon, and purchased the Simpson Lumber Company. By 1907, the Temples had moved to Southern California, where they lived in Los Altos, Los Angeles, Fresno and Pomona. George, Jennie and Myrtle Temple are entombed in the Inglewood Mausoleum.
