= Hanoverton Canal Town District =

Historic district in Ohio, United States

- U.S. National Register of Historic Places
- U.S. Historic district
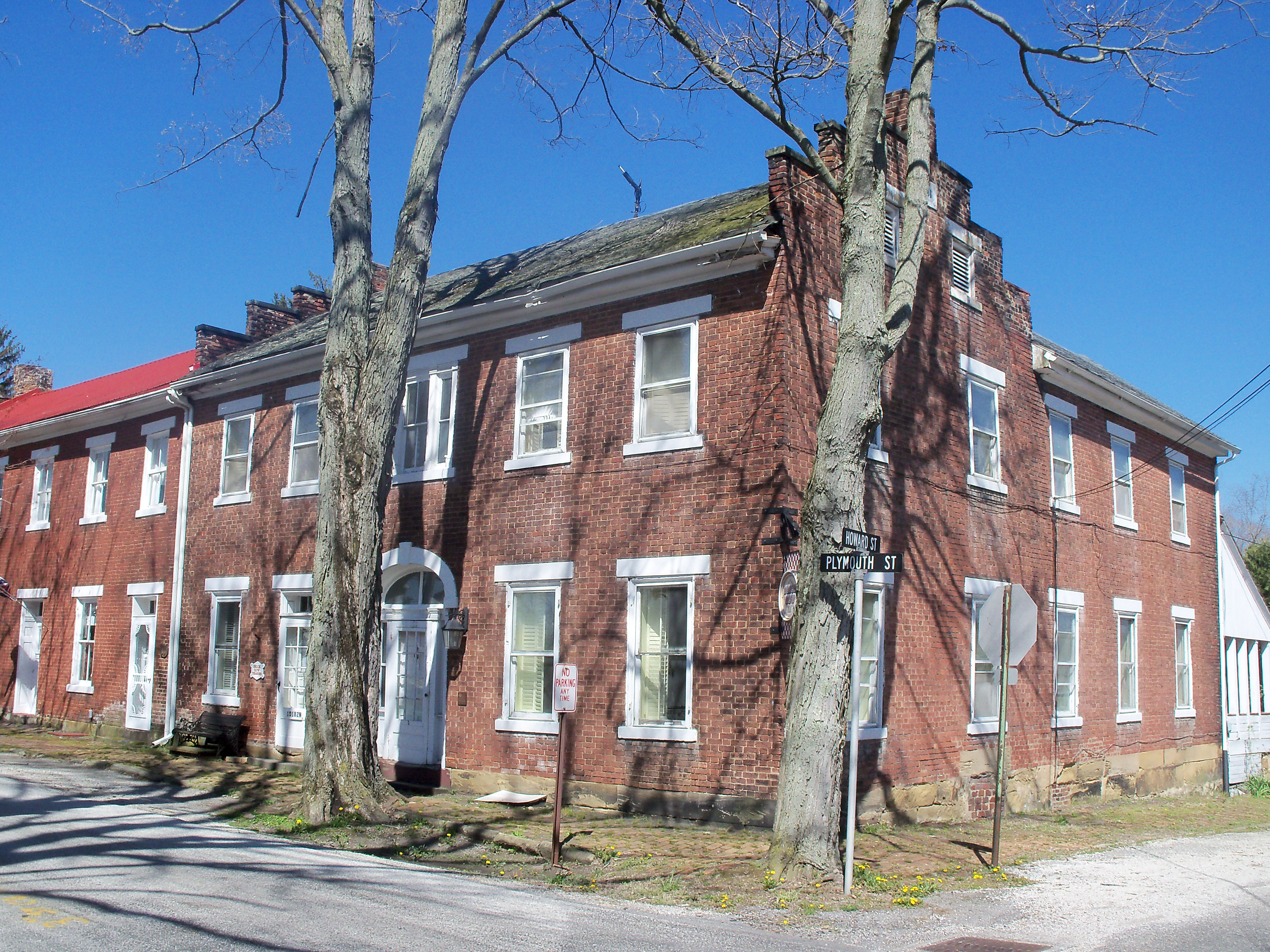
- Brick Row (1831), April 2016

- Location within Ohio Location within the United States
- Location: U.S. 30, Hanoverton, Ohio
- Coordinates: 40°45′08″N 80°56′07″W
- Area: 23 acres (9.3 ha)
- Built: 1817
- NRHP reference No.: 77001050
- Added to NRHP: August 3, 1977

The Hanoverton Canal Town District is a historic district in Hanoverton, Ohio, United States, that is listed on the National Register of Historic Places (NRHP.

== Description ==
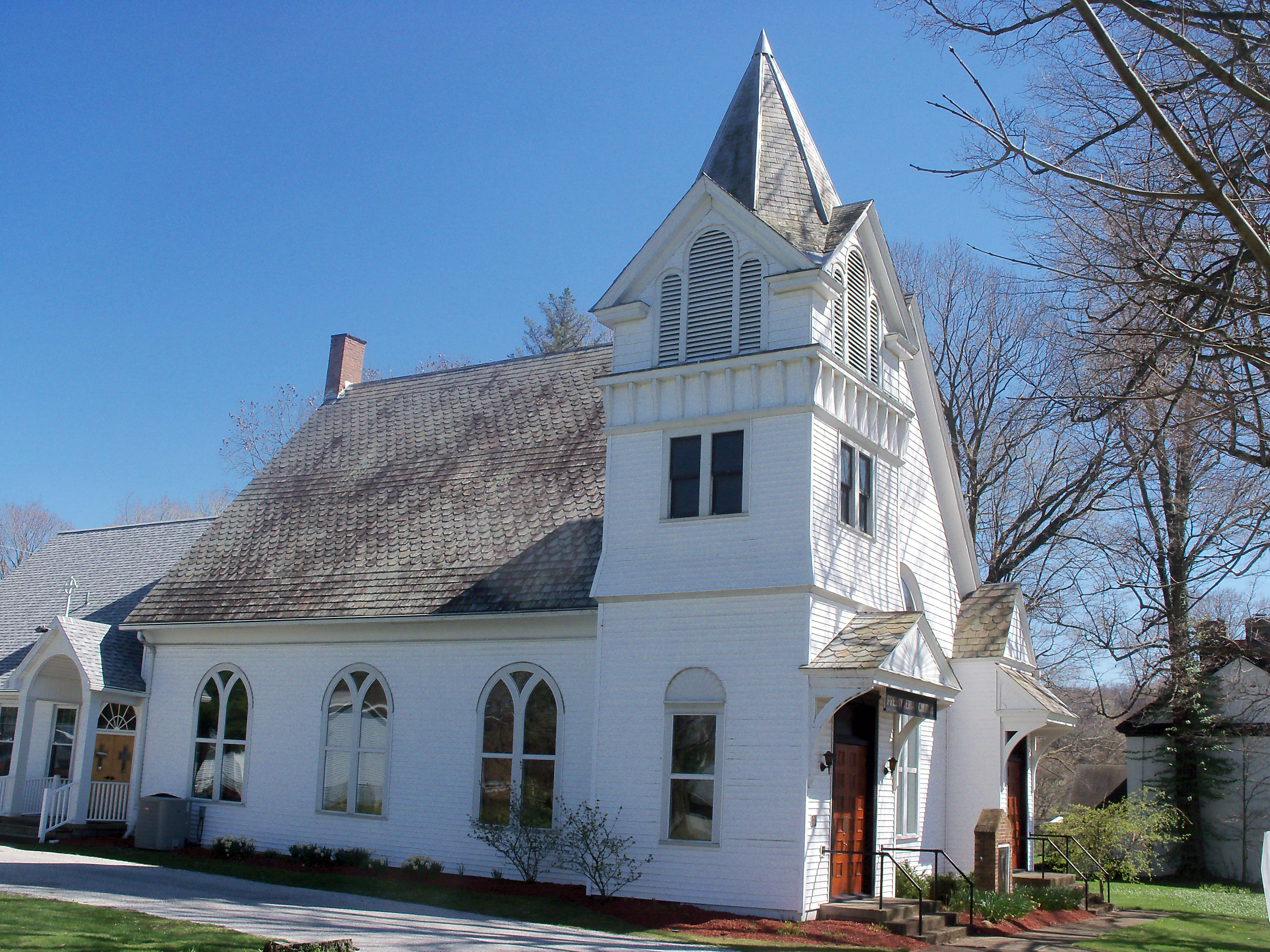
Hanoverton Presbyterian Church, April 2016

The district covers a 23-acre (9.3 ha) area along U.S. Route 30. It is characterized by examples of canal-era architecture of the early to mid-19th century. The town of Hanoverton was settled and platted in 1813.

Within the district, there are 30 brick and frame houses built between 1817 and 1874, which have remained unchanged over the years. The simple frame houses were originally built during the construction of the Hanoverton and the Sandy and Beaver Canal.

The district was listed on the NRHP August 3, 1977.

== See also ==
- National Register of Historic Places listings in Columbiana County, Ohio
