= Minerva Local School District =

School district in Ohio

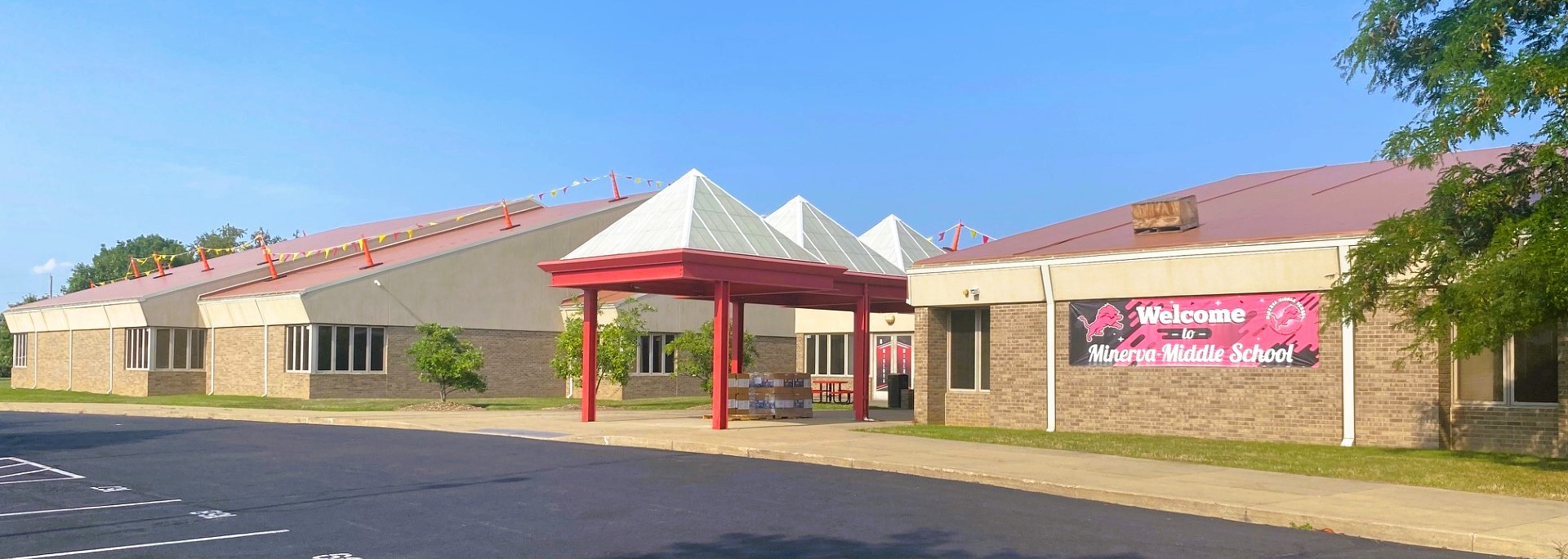

Location
- 406 East Street Minerva, Ohio

District information
- Type: Public Schools
- Motto: "Every child, Every minute, Every day"
- Grades: K-12
- Superintendent: Mark Scott
- Schools: 3
- Budget: 16 million

Students and staff
- Students: 1,800
- Student–teacher ratio: 18:1
- District mascot: Lions
- Colors: Red, Grey, and White.

Other information
- Website: https://www.mlsd.sparcc.org

Minerva Local School District is a rural public school district serving students in the tri-county area between Columbiana, Carroll, and Stark counties, and the village of Minerva, also a part of Paris township. The district is made up of 3 schools located along the bustling U.S. Route 30.

- Minerva Elementary (K-5) 850 students
- Minerva Middle (6-8) 450 students
- Minerva High (9-12) 600 students

11th and 12th grade students also have the chance to go to R. G. Drage Career Center.
