= Hanoverton, Ohio =

- Village
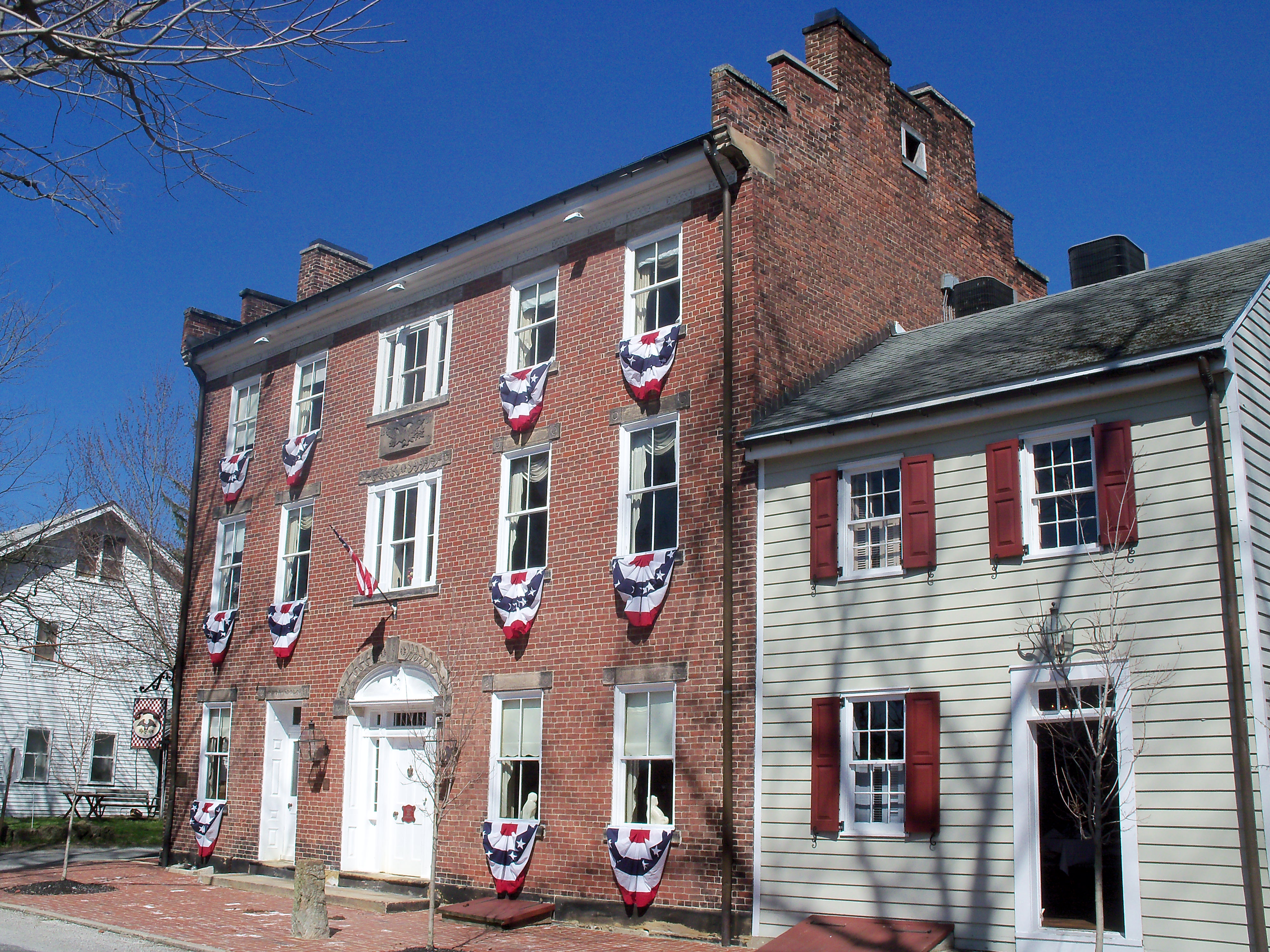
- Spread Eagle Tavern (1837) in the Hanoverton Canal Town District
- Interactive map of Hanoverton, Ohio
- Location within Ohio Location within the United States
- Coordinates: 40°45′08″N 80°56′08″W
- Country: United States
- State: Ohio
- County: Columbiana
- Founded: 1813

Government
  - Type: Mayor-Council
  - Mayor: Becky Kibler

Area
  - Total: 0.69 sq mi (1.80 km^{2})
  - Land: 0.69 sq mi (1.80 km^{2})
  - Water: 0 sq mi (0.00 km^{2})
- Elevation: 1,142 ft (348 m)

Population (2020)
  - Total: 354
  - Estimate (2023): 346
  - Density: 509.1/sq mi (196.57/km^{2})
- Time zone: UTC-5 (Eastern (EST))
  - Summer (DST): UTC-4 (EDT)
- ZIP code: 44423
- Area codes: 330, 234
- FIPS code: 39-33306
- GNIS feature ID: 2398245
- School District: United Local SD

Hanoverton is a village in Columbiana County, Ohio, United States. The population was 354 at the 2020 census.

== History ==
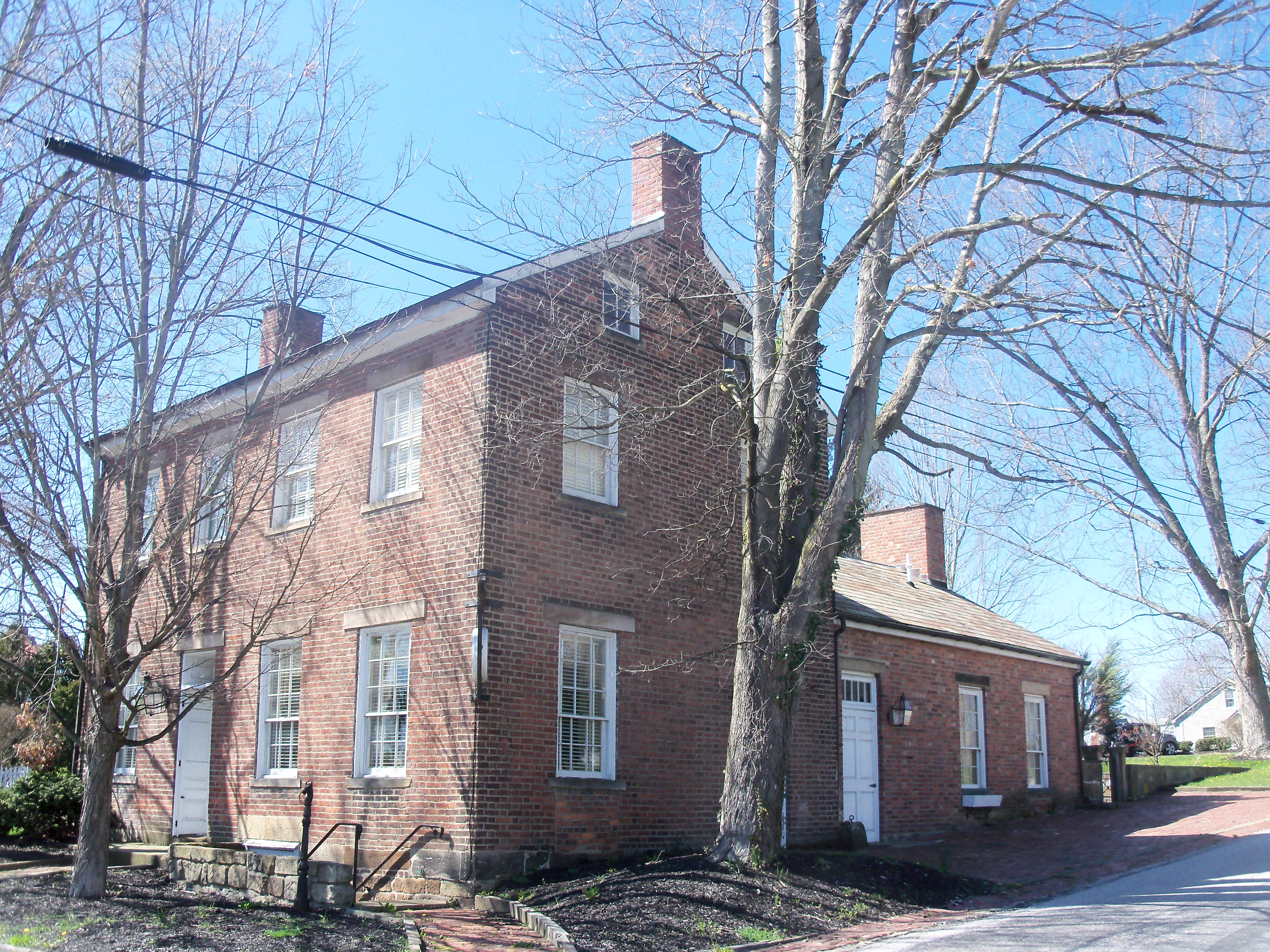
Hanover House, a saltbox house built in 1820, is part of the Hanoverton Canal Town District

Hanoverton was laid out in 1813 by Quaker abolitionist James Craig and incorporated as a village in 1836. Hanoverton experienced growth in the 1830s by the building of the Sandy and Beaver Canal through the town, reaching a peak population in the late decade of around 2,000 inhabitants. Growth slowed into the 1840s; by the 1852 completion of the Cleveland and Pittsburgh Railroad the canal was no longer profitable and the town declined.

Hanoverton played a part in the Underground Railroad. An underground passage connected George Sloan's "Brick Row" with his brother-in-law Dr. James Robertson's home across the street, where runaway slaves were taken to a secret room. The Spread Eagle Tavern also was connected to a secret tunnel. In 1977 a 23-acre area of Hanoverton was added to the National Register of Historic Places as the Hanoverton Canal Town District. The district is noted for canal-era architecture which is largely unchanged since construction in the mid-1800s.

More recently, the town has hosted various political speakers, including Dan Quayle, Newt Gingrich, Dick Cheney, John McCain, and JD Vance at the Spread Eagle Tavern.

== Geography ==
According to the United States Census Bureau, the village has a total area of 0.70 square miles (1.81 km^{2}), all land. It is approximately 25 miles (40 km) miles east of Canton and 30 miles (48 km) southwest of Youngstown.

== Demographics ==
Historical population
Census	Pop.	Note	%±
1870	481		—
1880	443		−7.9%
1890	306		−30.9%
1900	399		30.4%
1910	317		−20.6%
1920	266		−16.1%
1930	287		7.9%
1940	292		1.7%
1950	344		17.8%
1960	442		28.5%
1970	483		9.3%
1980	490		1.4%
1990	434		−11.4%
2000	387		−10.8%
2010	408		5.4%
2020	354		−13.2%
2023 (est.)	346	▼	−2.3%
U.S. Decennial Census

=== 2010 census ===
As of the census of 2010, there were 408 people, 162 households, and 115 families living in the village. The population density was 582.9 inhabitants per square mile (225.1/km^{2}). There were 175 housing units at an average density of 250.0 per square mile (96.5/km^{2}). The racial makeup of the village was 100.0% White.

There were 162 households, of which 30.9% had children under the age of 18 living with them, 53.1% were married couples living together, 9.9% had a female householder with no husband present, 8.0% had a male householder with no wife present, and 29.0% were non-families. 22.8% of all households were made up of individuals, and 10.5% had someone living alone who was 65 years of age or older. The average household size was 2.52 and the average family size was 2.97.

The median age in the village was 39.6 years. 23.8% of residents were under the age of 18; 8.1% were between the ages of 18 and 24; 25% were from 25 to 44; 27.6% were from 45 to 64; and 15.4% were 65 years of age or older. The gender makeup of the village was 47.8% male and 52.2% female.

=== 2000 census ===
As of the census of 2000, there were 387 people, 157 households, and 116 families living in the village. The population density was 547.4 inhabitants per square mile (211.4/km^{2}). There were 165 housing units at an average density of 233.4 per square mile (90.1/km^{2}). The racial makeup of the village was 98.45% White, 0.26% African American, 0.26% Native American, and 1.03% from two or more races. Hispanic or Latino of any race were 0.52% of the population.

There were 157 households, out of which 32.5% had children under the age of 18 living with them, 61.1% were married couples living together, 12.1% had a female householder with no husband present, and 26.1% were non-families. 22.9% of all households were made up of individuals, and 14.6% had someone living alone who was 65 years of age or older. The average household size was 2.46 and the average family size was 2.93.

In the village, the population was spread out, with 24.8% under the age of 18, 7.0% from 18 to 24, 27.9% from 25 to 44, 20.4% from 45 to 64, and 19.9% who were 65 years of age or older. The median age was 38 years. For every 100 females there were 87.0 males. For every 100 females age 18 and over, there were 90.2 males.

The median income for a household in the village was $36,538, and the median income for a family was $41,250. Males had a median income of $31,719 versus $20,625 for females. The per capita income for the village was $14,970. About 1.7% of families and 3.2% of the population were below the poverty line, including 4.4% of those under age 18 and 1.4% of those age 65 or over.

== Government ==
Hanoverton operates under a mayor–council government, where there are six council members elected as a legislature in addition to an independently elected mayor who serves as an executive. The current mayor is Becky Kibler.

== Education ==
Children in Hanoverton are served by the public United Local School District, which includes one elementary school, one middle school, and United High School.

== Notable people ==
- George Fries, U.S. Representative from Ohio's 17th District
- John Hastings, U.S. Representative from Ohio's 17th District
- Thomas Corwin Mendenhall, autodidact physicist and meteorologist, professor at Ohio State University
- Curtis H. Pettit, pioneer Minneapolis banker and member of the Minnesota House of Representatives and Minnesota Senate
- G. W. Temple, member of the Washington House of Representatives from the 3rd district
- Curtis C. Williams, politician and judge
