= Nimishillen Creek =

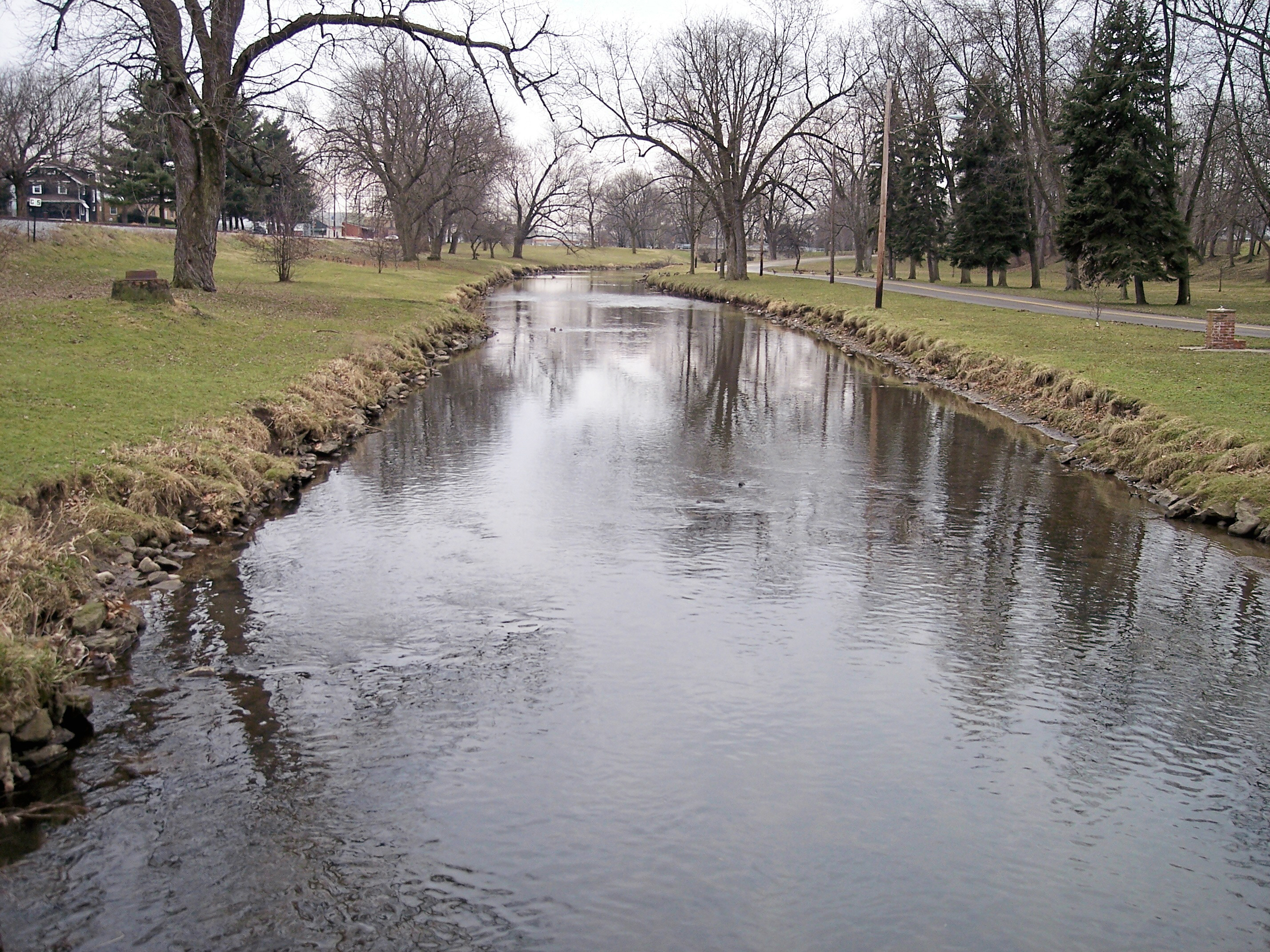
- West Branch Nimishillen Creek in a city park in Canton in 2006

Location
- Country: United States
- State: Ohio

Physical characteristics
- Source
  - location: Canton, Ohio, confluence of East and Middle Branches
  - coordinates: 40°48′24″N 81°21′14″W
- Mouth
  - location: Sandy Creek in Tuscarawas County, Ohio
  - elevation: 938 ft (286 m)
- Length: 24.5 mi (39.4 km)
- Basin size: 187 mi^{2} (480 km^{2})
- Discharge
  - location: USGS gauge at North Industry
  - average: 211.1 cu ft/s (5.98 m^{3}/s), water years 1922-2019

Nimishillen Creek is a tributary of Sandy Creek, 24.5 miles (39.4 km) long, in northeastern Ohio. Via Sandy Creek and the Tuscarawas, Muskingum and Ohio Rivers, it is part of the watershed of the Mississippi River, draining an area of 187 square miles (480 km^{2}), including the city of Canton.

== Geography ==
Nimishillen Creek flows on both glaciated (in the north) and unglaciated (in the south) portions of the Allegheny Plateau, in Stark and Tuscarawas Counties. It is formed in Canton by the confluence of the East Branch Nimishillen Creek and the Middle Branch Nimishillen Creek. The East Branch is 10.4 miles (16.7 km) long and flows through Louisville; the Middle Branch is 16.6 miles (26.7 km) long. Shortly downstream of this confluence, the stream collects the West Branch Nimishillen Creek, which is nine miles (14 km) long and flows through North Canton and Canton. From Canton, Nimishillen Creek flows generally southwardly, past East Sparta, into northern Tuscarawas County, where it flows into Sandy Creek from the north.

== Names ==
According to one tradition, the name "Nimishillen" is derived from a Native American word meaning "black alder".

According to the Geographic Names Information System, Nimishillen Creek has also been known historically as:

- Memenshehelas Creek
- Nanashehelas Creek
- Nemenshehela Creek
- Nemenshehelas Creek
- Nenenchelus Creek
- Nimishillen Run
- Nine Shilling Creek

== See also ==
- List of rivers of Ohio
