= United High School (Ohio) =

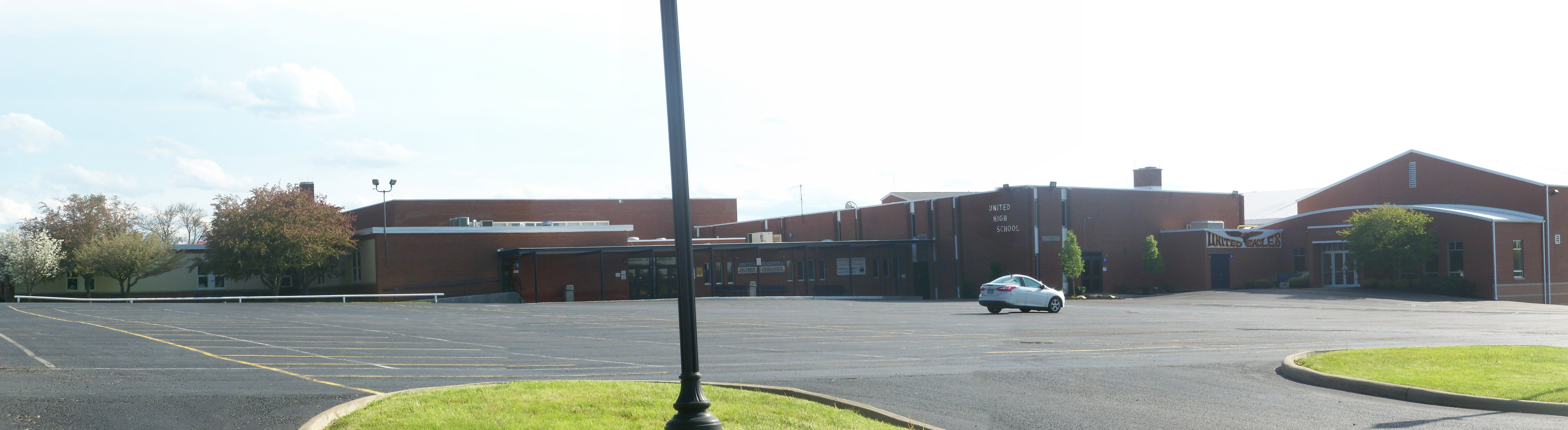

Location
- 8143 State Route 9 Hanoverton, Ohio 44423; United States
- Coordinates: 40°47′0″N 80°55′43″W

Information
- Type: Public, co-educational high school
- Opened: 1951
- School district: United Local School District
- Superintendent: Lance Hostetler
- NCES School ID: 390464502562
- Principal: Bill Young
- Faculty: 35.0 FTEs
- Grades: 7-12
- Enrollment: 541 (as of 2024–25)
- Student to teacher ratio: 15.5:1
- Campus type: Distant rural
- Colors: Navy blue and gold
- Fight song: Washington and Lee Swing
- Athletics conference: Eastern Ohio Athletic Conference
- Team name: Golden Eagles
- Newspaper: The Talon
- Yearbook: Unitas
- Website: www.united.k12.oh.us

United High School is a public high school near Hanoverton, Ohio, United States. It is the only secondary school in the United Local School District. Athletic teams compete as the United Golden Eagles in the Ohio High School Athletic Association as a member of the Eastern Ohio Athletic Conference.

As of the 2024–25 school year, the school had an enrollment of 541 students and 35.0 classroom teachers (on an FTE basis), for a student–teacher ratio of 15.5:1. There were 150 students (27.7% of enrollment) eligible for free lunch and 34 (6.3% of students) eligible for reduced-cost lunch.

The high school building closed at the end of the 2024–25 school year, to be replaced by a combined K–12 school building constructed at a cost of $59 million located next door to the previous school building.

== History ==
=== District formation ===
On July 19, 1944, the then Hanover Rural School District held a special meeting for the purpose of consolidating with two other districts formerly known as the Kensington Special School District and the Butler School District. Between the three districts, eleven one-room school houses united under one roof as the United Local School. Specifically, the first phase of this new building was the elementary building, constructed with fifteen classrooms in 1951. As the number of students grew and advanced through the grades, classes were added and the high school was completed in 1955 and the first class graduated in 1959.

=== Recent additions ===
Today, the original high school classrooms house seventh and eighth grade students. Additional classes and renovations came about in subsequent years, with the next major additions to take place in 1966. Eight years later, an elementary gymnasium was added (Brautigam Center). The elementary expanded with additional classrooms in 1984. The high school had a number of major additions in 1993 when the Brautigam Center was also renovated to accommodate kindergarten classrooms. A new auditorium and gymnasium were added in 1997, along with a third level of classrooms in the high school. In 2001, a new football stadium with a surrounding rubberized track was constructed. The newest addition, in 2004, added a wing that added six rooms to the east wing of the elementary and relocated the elementary office to the front of the building, with a parent drop-off driveway.

== Academics ==
United High School offers courses in the traditional American curriculum. Entering their third and fourth years, students can elect to attend the Columbiana County Career and Technical Center in Lisbon as either a part-time or full-time student.
