= Minerva, Ohio =

- Village
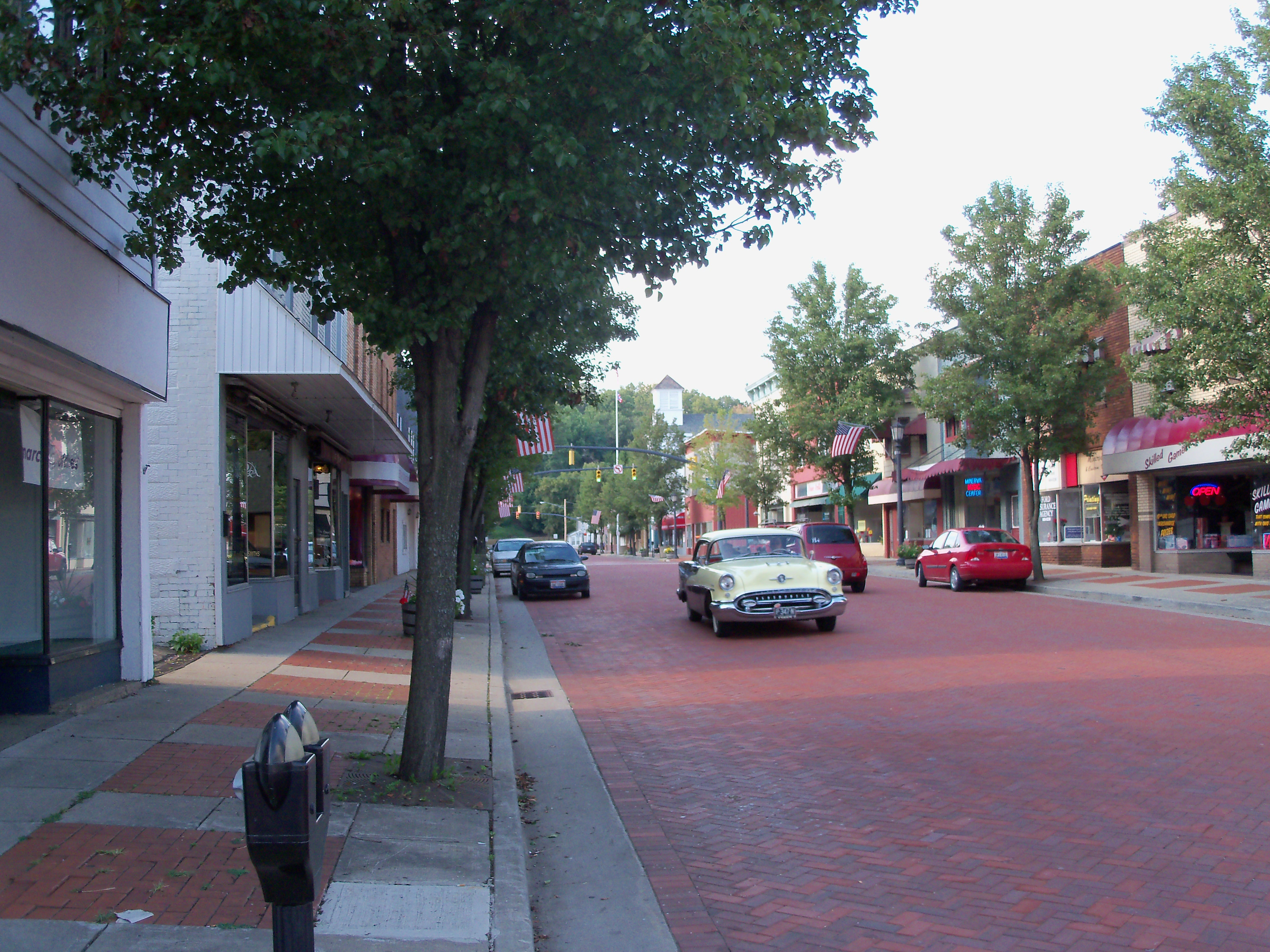
- Market Street (Ohio State Route 183)

- Flag Logo
- Motto(s): "It's more than just a Village, it's home."
- Interactive map of Minerva, Ohio
- Location within Ohio Location within the United States
- Coordinates: 40°43′44″N 81°6′7″W
- Country: United States
- State: Ohio
- Counties: Stark, Carroll, Columbiana
- Townships: Brown, Paris, West
- Established: 1833
- Incorporated: 1862
- Founder: John Whitacre
- Named for: Minerva Ann Taylor

Government
  - Type: Council–manager
  - Mayor: Mason Boldizar

Area
  - Total: 2.17 sq mi (5.61 km^{2})
  - Land: 2.17 sq mi (5.61 km^{2})
  - Water: 0 sq mi (0.00 km^{2})
- Elevation: 1,056 ft (322 m)

Population (2020)
  - Total: 3,684
  - Density: 1,699.8/sq mi (656.28/km^{2})
- Time zone: UTC-5 (Eastern (EST))
  - Summer (DST): UTC-4 (EDT)
- ZIP code: 44657
- Area codes: 330, 234
- FIPS code: 39-50834
- GNIS feature ID: 1056427
- School District: Minerva Local SD
- Website: minerva.oh.us

Minerva is a village primarily in Stark and Carroll counties in the U.S. state of Ohio, with a small district in Columbiana County. The population was 3,684 at the 2020 census. It is part of the Canton–Massillon metropolitan area.

== History ==
Minerva began when a surveyor named John Whitacre purchased 125 acres of land from Isaac Craig in 1818 for the construction of a log mill. The town, named for his niece, Minerva Ann Taylor, grew up around the mill. Minerva was established in 1833 and incorporated in 1862. Its first schoolhouse was built in 1846.

The Sandy and Beaver Canal helped drive Minerva's early economy, to be replaced in importance by the Pennsylvania Railroad in the 1840s. Minerva manufacturers Willard and Isaac Pennock patented the United States' first steel railroad car in the nineteenth century. In 1915, the town's weekly newspaper, The Minerva News, charged one dollar for an annual subscription.

== Geography ==
Minerva is located along Sandy Creek. According to the United States Census Bureau, the village has a total area of 2.23 square miles (5.78 km^{2}), all land.

== Demographics ==
Historical population
Census	Pop.	Note	%±
1870	210		—
1880	565		169.0%
1890	1,139		101.6%
1900	1,200		5.4%
1910	1,396		16.3%
1920	2,261		62.0%
1930	2,675		18.3%
1940	2,937		9.8%
1950	3,280		11.7%
1960	3,833		16.9%
1970	4,359		13.7%
1980	4,549		4.4%
1990	4,318		−5.1%
2000	3,934		−8.9%
2010	3,720		−5.4%
2020	3,684		−1.0%

=== 2020 census ===
As of the 2020 census, Minerva had a population of 3,684. The median age was 41.6 years. 22.1% of residents were under the age of 18 and 21.0% of residents were 65 years of age or older. For every 100 females there were 91.6 males, and for every 100 females age 18 and over there were 90.9 males age 18 and over.

0.0% of residents lived in urban areas, while 100.0% lived in rural areas.

There were 1,601 households in Minerva, of which 28.0% had children under the age of 18 living in them. Of all households, 41.0% were married-couple households, 20.3% were households with a male householder and no spouse or partner present, and 29.6% were households with a female householder and no spouse or partner present. About 33.7% of all households were made up of individuals and 15.9% had someone living alone who was 65 years of age or older.

There were 1,741 housing units, of which 8.0% were vacant. The homeowner vacancy rate was 1.0% and the rental vacancy rate was 9.2%.

Racial composition as of the 2020 census
Race	Number	Percent
White	3,426	93.0%
Black or African American	20	0.5%
American Indian and Alaska Native	12	0.3%
Asian	12	0.3%
Native Hawaiian and Other Pacific Islander	2	0.1%
Some other race	16	0.4%
Two or more races	196	5.3%
Hispanic or Latino (of any race)	56	1.5%

=== 2010 census ===
As of the census of 2010, there were 3,720 people, 1,580 households, and 1,009 families living in the village. The population density was 1,668.2 inhabitants per square mile (644.1/km^{2}). There were 1,762 housing units at an average density of 790.1 units per square mile (305.1 units/km^{2}). The racial makeup of the village was 97.7% White, 0.3% African American, 0.1% Native American, 0.3% Asian, 0.3% from other races, and 1.3% from two or more races. Hispanic or Latino of any race were 0.7% of the population.

There were 1,580 households, of which 29.9% had children under the age of 18 living with them, 45.4% were married couples living together, 13.6% had a female householder with no husband present, 4.9% had a male householder with no wife present, and 36.1% were non-families. 32.3% of all households were made up of individuals, and 16.6% had someone living alone who was 65 years of age or older. The average household size was 2.34 and the average family size was 2.93.

The median age in the village was 41.2 years. 23.6% of residents were under the age of 18; 7.9% were between the ages of 18 and 24; 22.8% were from 25 to 44; 25.9% were from 45 to 64; and 19.9% were 65 years of age or older. The gender makeup of the village was 47.4% male and 52.6% female.

=== 2000 census ===
As of the census of 2000, there were 3,934 people, 1,603 households, and 1,082 families living in the village. The population density was 1,840.3 inhabitants per square mile (710.5/km^{2}). There were 1,718 housing units at an average density of 803.7 units per square mile (310.3 units/km^{2}). The racial makeup of the village was 99.03% White, 0.05% African American, 0.08% Native American, 0.13% Asian, 0.05% from other races, and 0.66% from two or more races. Hispanic or Latino of any race were 0.48% of the population.

There were 1,603.5 households, out of which 30.31% had children under the age of 18 living with them, 51.1% were married couples living together, 12.9% had a female householder with no husband present, and 32.56% were non-families. 28.41% of all households were made up of individuals, and 13.1% had someone living alone who was 65 years of age or older. The average household size was 2.38 and the average family size was 2.91.

In the village, the population was spread out, with 23.6% under the age of 18, 8.8% from 18 to 24, 25.7% from 25 to 44, 23.5% from 45 to 64, and 18.5% who were 65 years of age or older. The median age was 40 years. For every 100 females there were 89.4 males. For every 100 females age 18 and over, there were 86.2 males.

The median income for a household in the village was $33,468, and the median income for a family was $39,669. Males had a median income of $30,477 versus $21,156 for females. The per capita income for the village was $116,853. About 6.3% of families and 9.8% of the population were below the poverty line, including 15.2% of those under age 18 and 7.3% of those age 65 or over.

== Government ==
Minerva operates under a chartered council–manager government, where there are four council members elected as a legislature for 4-year terms in addition to a mayor, who serves as an executive. The council employs a village manager for administration. The current mayor is Mason Boldizar, and the current village administrator is Diane Ruff.

== Education ==
Children in Minerva are served by the public Minerva Local School District, which includes one elementary school, one middle school, and Minerva High School.

== Notable people ==
- Carol Costello, television commentator, former host of CNN Newsroom
- John Cowan, soul music and progressive bluegrass musician; bassist for The Doobie Brothers
- Phil Davison, local politician and internet personality
- Oscar Grimes, professional baseball player; son of Ray Grimes and nephew of Roy Grimes, twin brothers who were also major league players
- Ralph Hodgson, poet
- Bill Powell, owner and designer of Clearview Golf Club
- A. J. Trauth, actor and musician, known for playing Alan Twitty on TV series Even Stevens
- Theodore Newton Vail, telephone industrialist
- Charles Erwin Wilson, former U.S. Secretary of Defense and CEO for General Motors
