= Sandy and Beaver Canal =

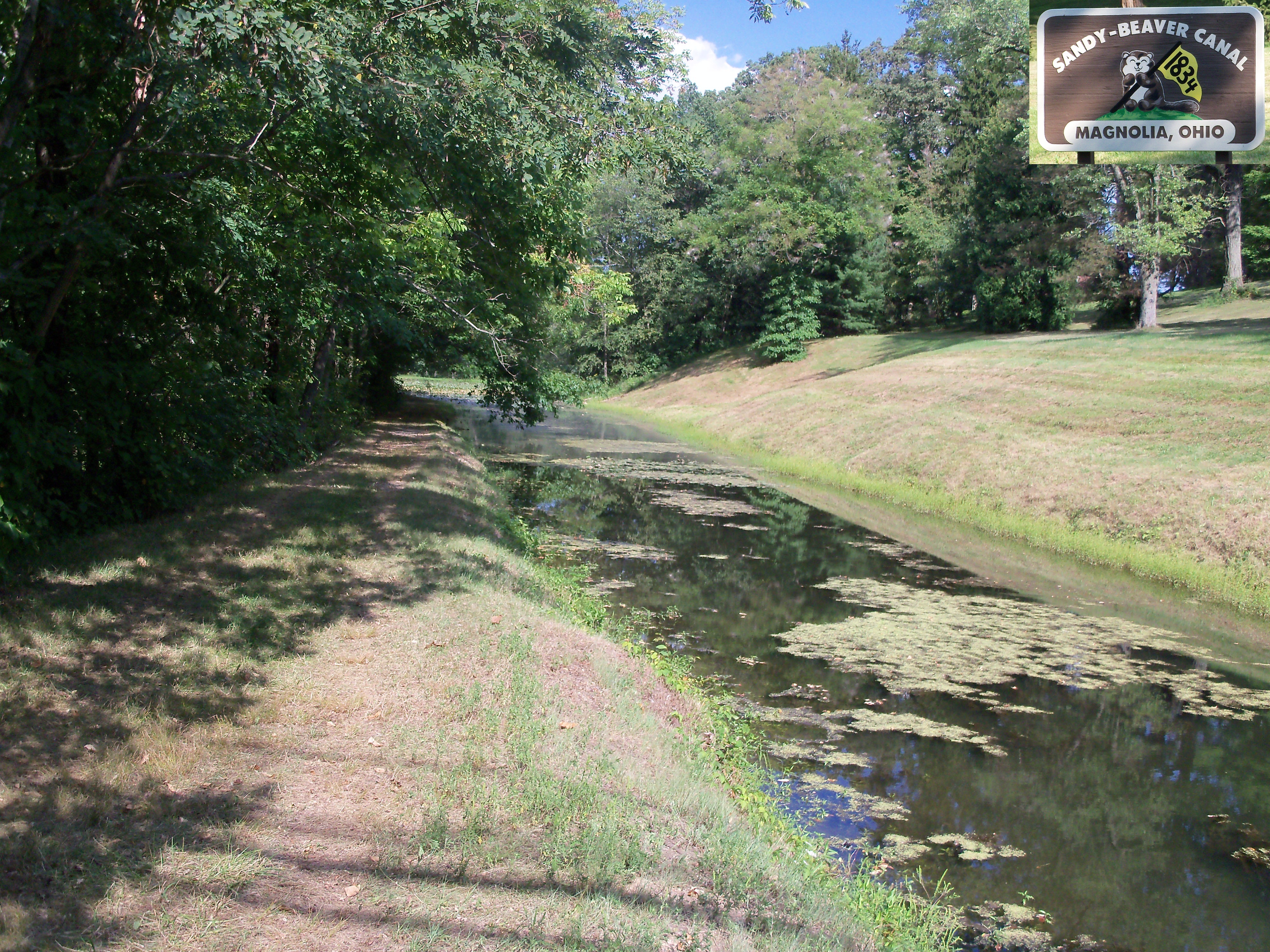
Near Magnolia

The Sandy and Beaver Canal was a canal and lock transportation system which ran seventy-three miles from the Ohio and Erie Canal at Bolivar, Ohio, to the Ohio River at Glasgow, Pennsylvania.

It was chartered in 1828 and completed twenty years later. It ceased operations in 1852.

== History and features ==
In 1828, Major D.B. Douglas of the United States Military Academy surveyed potential new canal routes, including the site that would ultimately be chosen as the location for the Sandy and Beaver Canal. The canal was then chartered later that year.

Completed in 1848, it had ninety locks. From the time of its opening, however, its middle section had repeated problems and ultimately fell into disrepair.

The canal ceased to operate in 1852, when the Cold Run Reservoir Dam outside of Lisbon, Ohio failed, ruining a large section of the canal.

This route was 90.5 miles (145.6 km), with seven aqueducts, 100 locks and a 2,700-foot (820 m) tunnel. The west division would rise for 33.5 miles (53.9 km), the middle division would be 14 miles (23 km), with tunnel, at summit elevation, and the east division would fall over 43 miles (69 km). The Douglas plan was rejected, and the Philadelphia Board of Trade decided that the Pennsylvania and Ohio Canal would be a better option to join the canal systems of Ohio to those of Pennsylvania.

At a meeting in Waynesburg, Ohio, in 1834, the canal promoters decided to go ahead without the Philadelphia backing. Hother Hage and Edward H. Gill were hired to engineer the project, and made changes to the Douglas plan. The 73-mile (117 km) canal, as constructed, consisted of the western division with a 400-foot (120 m) long aqueduct 28 feet (8.5 m) above the Tuscarawas River to connect to the Ohio and Erie Canal, thirty-three locks, five miles (8 km) of slackwater, two reservoirs, and a rise from 900 feet (270 m) at Bolivar to 1,120 feet (340 m) at Kensington. The middle division from Kensington to Lockbridge had two tunnels, and two reservoirs and was 14 miles (23 km), all at 1120 feet. The big tunnel was 900 yards or 1060 yards long. The little tunnel was about 1,000 feet (300 m) long. The tunnels were about 17 feet (5.2 m) high, and the big tunnel was about 80 feet (24 m) below the highest elevation of the hill it penetrated. The Eastern division was 27 miles (43 km) from Lockbridge to Glasgow, lowering from 1,120 feet (340 m) to 665 feet (203 m), with fifty-seven locks, twenty dams, and 17 miles (27 km) of slackwater.

Construction progressed until being interrupted by financial difficulties of the Panic of 1837. The number of workmen decreased from 2000 to 200. Little was done for seven years, and the tunnels were finally completed in 1848. Aside from the reservoir collapse in 1852, the Cleveland and Pittsburgh Railroad was built that year, taking business away. Six miles on the west end of the canal were used as a feeder of the Ohio and Erie Canal until 1884, when the aqueduct was lost in a flood.

A company called the “Nimishillen and Sandy Slackwater Navigation” was established to investigate a connector along the Nimishillen Creek from Sandyville, Ohio to Canton, Ohio in 1834–35. It was determined there was not enough water flow along this route to build a canal. A similar stillborn plan called the “Still Fork of Sandy Navigation Company” was incorporated in 1837 by some Carroll County, Ohio men to build a connector from Pekin up the Still Fork to near Carrollton, Ohio.

An original dam near Waynesburg, 40°40′02″N 81°16′29″W, still impounds a slackwater on the Sandy Creek, and feeds a section of canal downstream to Magnolia, Ohio.

Only 0.75 miles (1 km) of this privately funded canal lay in Pennsylvania; the rest was in Ohio.

== See also ==
- Hanoverton Canal Town District
- List of canals in the United States
- Elson Mill is fed by the canal.
