= Braceville Airport =

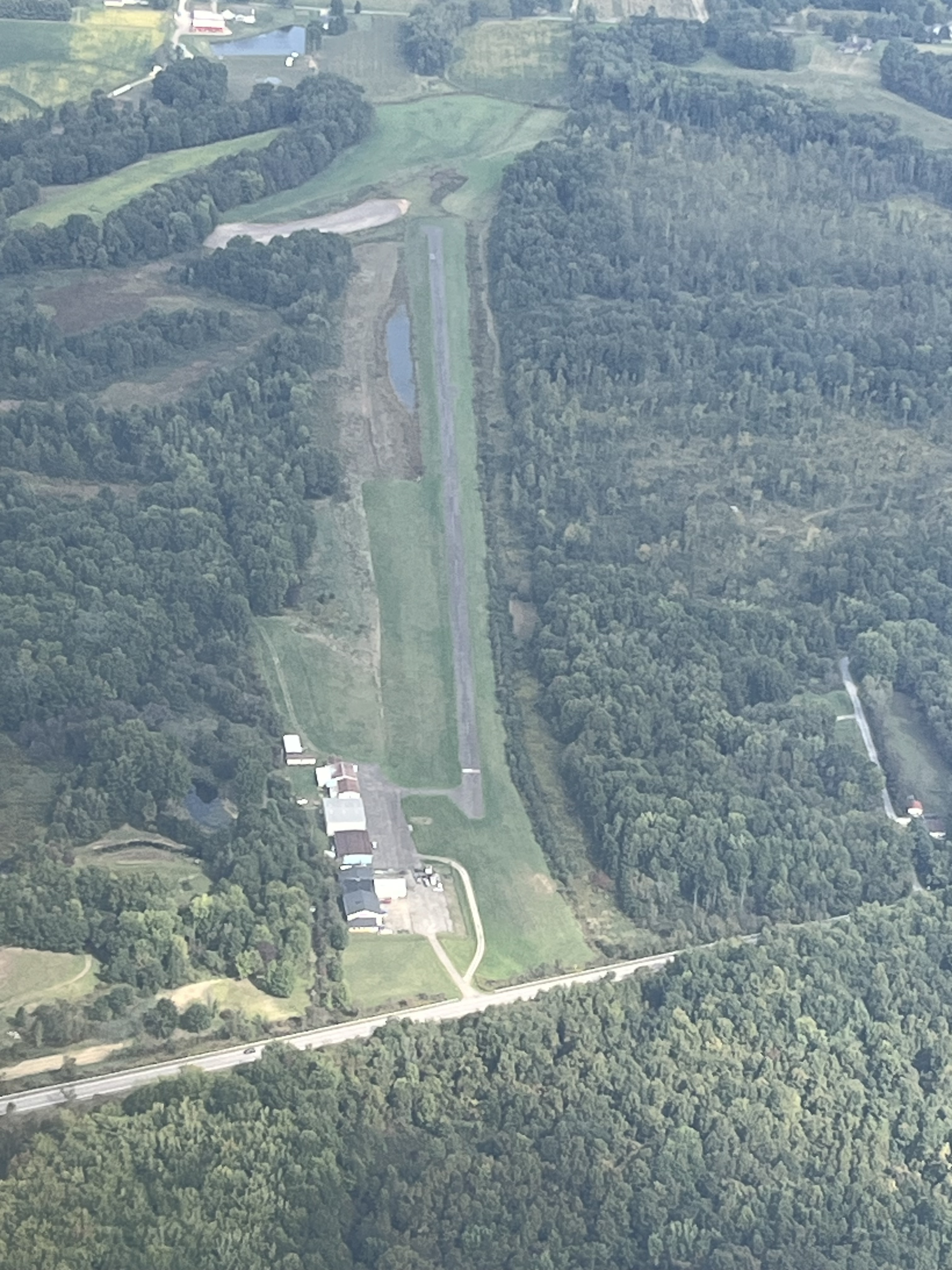
- Braceville Airport from the air, September 2024
- IATA: none; ICAO: none; FAA LID: 41N

Summary
- Airport type: Privately owned, publicly used
- Owner: Braceville Airport LLC
- Serves: Youngstown, Ohio
- Location: Newton Falls, Ohio
- Elevation AMSL: 900 ft (270 m)
- Coordinates: 41°12′40″N 080°58′09″W

Map
- Location of airport in Ohio 41N (the United States)

Runways
Direction	Length		Surface
Direction	ft	m	Surface
01/19	3,000	915	Asphalt
- Source: Federal Aviation Administration

Braceville Airport (FAA LID: 41N) is a public use airport in Trumbull County, Ohio, United States. It is located two miles north of the town of Newton Falls, Ohio.

Braceville Airport was originally certified as an airport in 1969. It is at an elevation of approximately 900 feet above mean sea level.

== Facilities and aircraft ==
The Braceville Airport has one runway: 01/19 which is 3,000 by 30 feet with an asphalt pavement. As of 2025, the runway is in poor condition.

The airport does not have a fixed-base operator, and no fuel is available.

There are 7 aircraft based at the Braceville Airport, all single engine airplanes.

== Accidents and incidents ==
- On September 4, 2021, an ultralight aircraft crashed while operating at the Braceville Airport.

== See also ==
- Lansdowne Airport
- Salem Airpark
- List of airports in Ohio
- Youngstown Elser Metro Airport
- Youngstown Executive Airport
- Youngstown-Warren Regional Airport
