= List of airports in Ohio =

This is a list of airports in Ohio (a U.S. state), grouped by type and sorted by location. It contains all public-use and military airports in the state. Some private-use and former airports may be included where notable, such as airports that were previously public-use, those with commercial enplanements recorded by the FAA or airports assigned an IATA airport code.

Note: Cincinnati is served by the Cincinnati/Northern Kentucky International Airport located in Hebron, Kentucky, and Marietta is served by the Mid-Ohio Valley Regional Airport located in Wood County, West Virginia.

== Airports ==
This list contains the following information:

- **City served** – The city generally associated with the airport, as per the airport's master record with the Federal Aviation Administration. This is not always the actual location since some airports are located in smaller towns outside of the city they serve. It is not meant to be a complete list of cities served, which can be found in or added to each airport's Wikipedia article.
- **FAA** – The location identifier assigned by the Federal Aviation Administration (FAA).
- **IATA** – The airport code assigned by the International Air Transport Association (IATA). Those that do not match the FAA code are shown in bold.
- **ICAO** – The location indicator assigned by the International Civil Aviation Organization (ICAO).
- **Airport name** – The official airport name. Those shown in **bold** indicate the airport has scheduled passenger service on commercial airlines.
- **Role** – One of four FAA airport categories, as per the 2021–2025 National Plan of Integrated Airport Systems (NPIAS) report released September 2020:
  - P-s: Commercial service – primary are publicly owned airports that receive scheduled passenger service and have more than 10,000 passenger boardings (enplanements) each year. Each primary airport is sub-classified by the FAA as one of the following four "hub" types (s):
    - L: Large hub that accounts for at least 1% of total U.S. passenger enplanements.
    - M: Medium hub that accounts for between 0.25% and 1% of total U.S. passenger enplanements.
    - S: Small hub that accounts for between 0.05% and 0.25% of total U.S. passenger enplanements.
    - N: Nonhub that accounts for less than 0.05% of total U.S. passenger enplanements, but more than 10,000 annual enplanements.
  - CS: Commercial service – nonprimary are publicly owned airports that receive scheduled passenger service and have at least 2,500 passenger boardings each year.
  - R: Reliever airports are designated by the FAA to relieve congestion at a large commercial service airport and to provide more general aviation access to the overall community.
  - GA: General aviation airports are the largest single group of airports in the U.S. airport system. They are public-use airports that do not have scheduled service or have scheduled service with less than 2,500 passenger boardings each year.
- **Enplanements** – The number of enplanements (commercial passenger boardings) that occurred at the airport in calendar year 2024, as per FAA records released October 2025.

City served	FAA	IATA	ICAO	Airport name	Role	Enplanements (2024)
				**Commercial service – primary airports**		
Akron / Canton	CAK	CAK	KCAK	**Akron–Canton Airport**	P-N	380,232
Cleveland	CLE	CLE	KCLE	**Cleveland Hopkins International Airport**	P-M	4,950,345
Columbus	CMH	CMH	KCMH	**John Glenn Columbus International Airport**	P-M	4,387,395
Columbus	LCK	LCK	KLCK	**Rickenbacker International Airport**	P-N	143,035
Dayton	DAY	DAY	KDAY	**James M. Cox Dayton International Airport**	P-S	624,995
Toledo	TOL	TOL	KTOL	**Eugene F. Kranz Toledo Express Airport**	P-N	66,614
				**Reliever airports**		
Cleveland	CGF	CGF	KCGF	Cuyahoga County Airport (Robert D. Shea Field)	R	77
Columbus	TZR		KTZR	Bolton Field	R	0
Columbus	OSU	OSU	KOSU	Ohio State University Airport	R	85
Dayton	MGY	MGY	KMGY	Dayton–Wright Brothers Airport	R	57
Hamilton	HAO	HAO	KHAO	Butler County Regional Airport (Hogan Field)	R	5
Lorain / Elyria	LPR	LPR	KLPR	Lorain County Regional Airport	R	10
Medina	1G5			Medina Municipal Airport	R	13
Willoughby	LNN	LNN	KLNN	Lake County Executive Airport	R	0
				**General aviation airports**		
Akron	AKR	AKC	KAKR	Akron Fulton International Airport	GA	35
Alliance	2D1			Barber Airport	GA	0
Ashland	3G4			Ashland County Airport	GA	0
Ashtabula	HZY	JFN	KHZY	Northeast Ohio Regional Airport	GA	0
Athens / Albany	UNI	ATO	KUNI	Ohio University Airport (Snyder Field)	GA	0
Barnesville	6G5			Barnesville-Bradfield Airport	GA	0
Batavia	I69			Clermont County Airport	GA	0
Bellefontaine	EDJ		KEDJ	Bellefontaine Regional Airport	GA	0
Bluffton	5G7			Bluffton Airport	GA	0
Bowling Green	1G0			Wood County Airport	GA	0
Bryan	0G6			Williams County Airport	GA	0
Bucyrus	17G			Port Bucyrus–Crawford County Airport	GA	0
Cadiz	8G6			Harrison County Airport	GA	0
Cambridge	CDI		KCDI	Cambridge Municipal Airport	GA	0
Carrollton	TSO		KTSO	Carroll County-Tolson Airport	GA	0
Celina	CQA		KCQA	Lakefield Airport	GA	3
Chesapeake / Huntington, WV	HTW	HTW	KHTW	Lawrence County Airpark	GA	0
Chillicothe	RZT		KRZT	Ross County Airport	GA	0
Cincinnati	LUK	LUK	KLUK	Cincinnati Municipal Airport (Lunken Field)	GA	1,470
Circleville	CYO		KCYO	Pickaway County Memorial Airport	GA	0
Cleveland	BKL	BKL	KBKL	Burke Lakefront Airport	GA	1,668
Coshocton	I40			Richard Downing Airport	GA	0
Dayton	I19			Greene County–Lewis A. Jackson Regional Airport	GA	0
Defiance	DFI	DFI	KDFI	Defiance Memorial Airport	GA	3
Delaware	DLZ		KDLZ	Delaware Municipal Airport (Jim Moore Field)	GA	16
East Liverpool	02G			Columbiana County Airport	GA	0
Findlay	FDY	FDY	KFDY	Findlay Airport	GA	6
Fostoria	FZI		KFZI	Fostoria Metropolitan Airport	GA	0
Fremont	S24			Sandusky County Regional Airport	GA	0
Galion	GQQ	GQQ	KGQQ	Galion Municipal Airport	GA	1
Gallipolis	GAS		KGAS	Gallia–Meigs Regional Airport	GA	0
Georgetown	GEO		KGEO	Brown County Airport	GA	0
Harrison	I67			Cincinnati West Airport	GA	0
Hillsboro	HOC		KHOC	Highland County Airport	GA	0
Jackson	I43			James A. Rhodes Airport	GA	0
Kelleys Island	89D			Kelleys Island Land Field	GA	0
Kent	1G3			Kent State University Airport	GA	0
Kenton	I95			Hardin County Airport	GA	0
Lancaster	LHQ		KLHQ	Fairfield County Airport	GA	0
Lebanon	I68			Warren County Airport (John Lane Field)	GA	19
Lima	AOH	AOH	KAOH	Lima Allen County Airport	GA	0
London	UYF		KUYF	Madison County Airport	GA	0
Mansfield	MFD	MFD	KMFD	Mansfield Lahm Regional Airport	GA	5
Marion	MNN	MNN	KMNN	Marion Municipal Airport	GA	10
Marysville	MRT		KMRT	Union County Airport	GA	0
McArthur	22I			Vinton County Airport	GA	0
Middle Bass Island	3T7			Middle Bass Island Airport	GA	0
Middlefield	7G8			Geauga County Airport	GA	0
Middletown	MWO	MWO	KMWO	Middletown Regional Airport (Hook Field)	GA	0
Millersburg	10G			Holmes County Airport	GA	0
Mount Gilead	4I9			Morrow County Airport	GA	0
Mount Vernon	4I3			Knox County Airport	GA	9
Napoleon	7W5			Henry County Airport	GA	0
New Lexington	I86			Perry County Airport	GA	0
New Philadelphia	PHD	PHD	KPHD	Harry Clever Field	GA	0
Newark	VTA		KVTA	Newark-Heath Airport	GA	0
North Bass Island	3X5			North Bass Island Airport	GA	0
Norwalk	5A1			Norwalk-Huron County Airport	GA	0
Ottawa	OWX		KOWX	Putnam County Airport	GA	0
Oxford	OXD	OXD	KOXD	Miami University Airport	GA	5
Port Clinton	PCW		KPCW	Erie–Ottawa International Airport (Carl R. Keller Field)	CS	14
Portsmouth / Minford	PMH	PMH	KPMH	Greater Portsmouth Regional Airport	GA	0
Put-in-Bay	3W2			Put in Bay Airport	GA	0
Ravenna	POV			Portage County Airport	GA	8
Sidney	SCA			Sidney City Airport	GA	1
Springfield	SGH	SGH	KSGH	Springfield–Beckley Municipal Airport	GA	2
Steubenville	2G2			Jefferson County Airpark (Geary A. Bates Airport)	GA	0
Tiffin	16G			Seneca County Airport	GA	5
Toledo	TDZ	TDZ	KTDZ	Toledo Executive Airport	GA	0
Upper Sandusky	56D			Wyandot County Airport	GA	0
Urbana	I74			Grimes Field	GA	0
Van Wert	VNW		KVNW	Van Wert County Airport	GA	16
Versailles	VES		KVES	Darke County Airport	GA	0
Wadsworth	3G3			Wadsworth Municipal Airport	GA	0
Wapakoneta	AXV	AXV	KAXV	Neil Armstrong Airport	GA	0
Warren	62D			Warren Airport	GA	0
Washington Court House	I23			Fayette County Airport	GA	0
Wauseon	USE		KUSE	Fulton County Airport	GA	0
Waverly	EOP		KEOP	Pike County Airport	GA	0
West Union	AMT		KAMT	Alexander Salamon Airport	GA	0
Wilmington	I66			Clinton Field	GA	0
Woodsfield	4G5			Monroe County Airport	GA	0
Wooster	BJJ	BJJ	KBJJ	Wayne County Airport	GA	2
Youngstown	YNG	YNG	KYNG	Youngstown–Warren Regional Airport / Youngstown ARS	GA	523
Zanesville	ZZV	ZZV	KZZV	Zanesville Municipal Airport	GA	1
				**Other public-use airports** (not listed in NPIAS)		
Ada	0D7			Ada Airport		
Akron	1D4			Mayfield Airport		
Alliance	4G3			Miller Airport		
Baltimore	7B4			Miller Farm Landing Strip		
Beach City	2D7			Beach City Airport		
Bowling Green	3D8			Bordner Airport		
Caldwell	I10			Noble County Airport		
Carrollton	5D6			Parsons Airport		
Centerburg	6CM			Chapman Memorial Field		
Clyde	5D9			Bandit Field Airdrome		
Columbia Station	4G8			Columbia Airport		
Dayton	I73			Moraine Air Park		
Dayton	I44			Dahio Trotwood Airport (Dayton-New Lebanon Airport)		
Dayton / Phillipsburg	3I7			Dayton/Phillipsburg Airport		
Deshler	6D7			Deshler Municipal Landing Strip		
Elyria	1G1			Elyria Airport		
Fremont	14G			Fremont Airport		
Garrettsville	7D8			Gates Airport		
Geneva	7D9			Germack Airport		
Huron	88D			Hinde Airport		
Leipsic	R47			Ruhe's Airport		
McConnelsville	I71			Morgan County Airport		
Middle Bass Island	3W9			Middle Bass-East Point Airport		
Mount Vernon	6G4			Wynkoop Airport		
Mount Victory	O74			Elliot's Landing Airport		
Newton Falls	41N			Braceville Airport		
Painesville	2G1			Concord Airpark		
Piqua	I17			Piqua Airport (Hartzell Field)		
Radnor	5E9			Packer Airport		
St. Clairsville	2P7			Alderman Airport		
St. Marys	O12			Grand Lake St. Marys Seaplane Base		
Salem	38D			Salem Airpark		
Salem	8G8			Koons Airport		
Sebring	3G6			Tri-City Airport		
Shelby	12G			Shelby Community Airport		
Toronto	1G8			Eddie Dew Memorial Airpark		
Tremont City	I54			Mad River Airpark		
Troy	1WF			Waco Field		
Urbana	38I			Weller Airport		
Wadsworth	15G			Weltzien Skypark		
Wakeman	I64			Ortner Airport (formerly Wakeman Airport)		
Waynesville	40I			Red Stewart Airfield		
West Lafayette	80G			Tri-City Airport		
Willard	8G1			Willard Municipal Airport		
Wilmington	ILN	ILN	KILN	Wilmington Air Park		16
Wilmington	2B6			Hollister Field		
Youngstown	4G4			Youngstown Elser Metro Airport		6
Youngstown	04G			Lansdowne Airport		
Zanesville	42I			Parr Airport		
				**Other military airports**		
Dayton	FFO	FFO	KFFO	Wright-Patterson Air Force Base		347
				**Notable private-use airports**		
Columbus	75OA			Darby Dan Airport		
Hiram	OI41			Far View Airport		
Troy	OH71			Troy Skypark		
				**Notable former airports**		
Bellefontaine	~~7I7~~			Bellefontaine Municipal Airport (replacement opened 2002)		
Brookville	~~I62~~			Brookville Air-Park		
Canton	~~5D4~~			Martin Airport (closed 1997)		
Chagrin Falls	~~5G1~~			Chagrin Falls Airport (closed 1979)		
Chardon	~~4D6~~			Chardon Airfield (closed 1987–1994)		
Cincinnati	~~ISZ~~		~~KISZ~~	Cincinnati-Blue Ash Airport (closed 2012)		
Circleville	~~03I~~			Clarks Dream Strip (closed 2016?)		
Columbus	~~04I~~			Columbus Southwest Airport (closed 2020)		
Columbus	~~4I2~~			South Columbus Airport (closed 1994–2000)		
Crooksville	~~I84~~			Crooksville Airport		
Findlay	~~7D5~~			Priebe Airport (closed 2010?)		
Freedom	~~7D6~~			Freedom Air Field (closed 2006/2007?)		
Green Springs	~~82D~~			Weiker Airport		
Jamestown	~~14I~~			Bloom Airport		
LaGrange	~~92D~~			Harlan Airfield		
Mantua	~~7E3~~			Mills Airport (closed 2015/2016?)		
Orwell	~~9B9~~			Champion Executive Airport (closed 2006/2007?)		
Painesville	~~PVZ~~			Casement Airport (closed 2000)		
Pandora	~~6C2~~			Ohio Dusting Company Airport		
Paulding	~~2H8~~			Paulding Airport (closed 2017-2018?)		
Sandusky	~~SKY~~	~~SKY~~	~~KSKY~~	Griffing Sandusky Airport (closed 2013)		
Smithfield	~~44D~~			Jefferson County Airport		
Strongsville	~~1G6~~			Strongsville Airpark (closed 1987)		
Wellington	~~67D~~			Reader-Botsford Airport (closed 2016-2017?)		
Youngstown	~~06G~~			Youngstown Executive Airport (closed 1994–2002)		

== See also ==
- List of defunct airports in the United States
- Ohio World War II Army Airfields
- Wikipedia:WikiProject Aviation/Airline destination lists: North America#Ohio
