= Ashland County Airport =

- IATA: none; ICAO: none; FAA LID: 3G4

Summary
- Airport type: Public
- Owner: Ashland County Airport Authority
- Operator: Tailwinds Air Service
- Serves: City of Ashland, Ohio
- Location: Ashland County, Ohio
- Time zone: UTC−05:00 (-5)
  - Summer (DST): UTC−04:00 (-4)
- Elevation AMSL: 1,206 ft (368 m)
- Coordinates: 40°54′11″N 082°15′20″W

Map
- Location of airport in Ohio 3G4 (the United States)

Runways
Direction	Length		Surface
Direction	ft	m	Surface
1/19	3,502	1,067	Asphalt

Statistics (2021)
- Aircraft operations: 8,395
- Based aircraft: 36
- Source: Federal Aviation Administration

The Ashland County Airport (FAA LID: 3G4) is a public-use airport in Ashland County, Ohio, United States. It is located three nautical miles (3.5 mi; 5.6 km) northeast of the central business district of the City of Ashland. It is included in the FAA's National Plan of Integrated Airport Systems for 2011–2015, which categorized it as a general aviation facility.

== History ==
Plans for a new airport were announced in March 1967 after a lease was signed for 100 acres (40 ha) of a 172 acres (70 ha) site. A lawsuit attempting to invalidate the contract, which was signed with a limited partnership, was filed two months later. Construction on the airport started in mid-summer 1967. By late November 1968, a ten unit t-hangar had been built. Construction of an additional ten t-hangars was approved in May 1969. By mid-June 1969, a fixed-base operated called Hausserman Aviation was in operation at the airport. The airport was dedicated on 5 July 1970.

Heck Flying Service became airport manager in April 1977. By late August 1979 the runway had been repaved and a taxiway extension was being considered.

The airport asked for $572,000 to build a new 2,200-square-foot (200 m^{2}) terminal in 2021. A $75,000 grant to build an access road from Ohio Route 42 to the airport was approved in 2022. A new terminal was dedicated in December 2025.

== Facilities and aircraft ==
Ashland County Airport covers an area of 45 acres (18 ha) at an elevation of 1,206 feet (368 m) above mean sea level. It has one runway, designated as runway 1/19. It has an asphalt surface and measures 3,501 by 75 feet (1,067 by 23 m).

For the 12-month period ending April 30, 2021, the airport had 8,395 aircraft operations, an average of 23 per day: 98% general aviation, 2% military, and <1% air taxi. At that time there were 36 aircraft based at this airport: 34 single-engine and 2 multi-engine airplanes. This is down from 49,240 annual operations and 37 based aircraft in 2010.

The airport has a fixed-base operator that sells fuel, both avgas and jet fuel, and offers amenities such as general aircraft maintenance, catering, courtesy transportation, conference rooms, a crew lounge, and more.

== Accidents and incidents ==
- On July 7, 2003, an experimentally-built Wohlers Falco F.8L aircraft was substantially damaged during a forced landing following a total loss of power while departing from the Ashland County Airport. According to the pilot, as the airplane was climbing at about 100 feet above the ground, the engine suddenly lost all power. The pilot performed a forced landing to a grass field with the landing gear retracted. Upon touchdown, the airplane slid to a stop and came to rest upright. The probable cause of the accident was found to be a loss of engine power due to the failure of the engine air intake duct tubing, which resulted in a total blockage of the induction inlet duct, with a contributing factor being an inadequate 100-hour inspection by maintenance personnel.
- On August 12, 2017, a North American SNJ-4 crashed while landing at the Ashland County Airport. The pilot was attempting a "wheel landing" when the aircraft bounced twice and veered off the runway into a grass area. Despite adding rudder to correct the overrun, the aircraft slipped in the grass and could not return to the paved runway surface. The aircraft subsequently came to rest inverted after stopping. The probable cause of the accident was found to be the pilot's improper recovery from a bounced landing, which resulted in a loss of directional control.
- On February 18, 2018, a tailwheel-equipped Piper PA-22 was damaged during landing at the Ashland County Airport. The pilot reported that the airplane bounced on touchdown before settling on all three landing gear and immediately veering to the left. The pilot attempted to correct with right aileron and right rudder application, then the airplane veered to the right. The airplane exited the right side of the runway and rotated about 180° before it came to rest. The probable cause of the accident was found to be the pilot's failure to maintain directional control during the landing roll resulting in a ground loop.
- On August 6, 2022, a man was injured by fireworks at the Ashland County Airport. The man was an employee preparing the fireworks display. The incident is under investigation.

== See also ==
- List of airports in Ohio
