= DLZ =

DLZ may refer to:

- "DLZ", a 2008 song by TV on the Radio from Dear Science
- DLZ, the FAA LID code for Delaware Municipal Airport, Ohio, United States
- DLZ, the IATA code for Dalanzadgad Airport, Ömnögovi Province, Mongolia
