= Willard Municipal Airport =

Public use airport in Willard, Ohio

Willard Airport
- IATA: none; ICAO: none; FAA LID: 8G1

Summary
- Airport type: Public
- Owner: City of Willard
- Location: Willard, Ohio
- Time zone: UTC−05:00 (-5)
  - Summer (DST): UTC−04:00 (-4)
- Elevation AMSL: 967 ft / 295 m
- Coordinates: 41°02′19″N 082°43′28″W

Map
- Location of airport in Ohio 8G1 (the United States)

Runways
Direction	Length		Surface
Direction	ft	m	Surface
10/28	4,028	1,228	Asphalt

Statistics (2021)
- Aircraft Operations: 515
- Based aircraft: 0
- Sources: Federal Aviation Administration, AirNav, SkyVector

Willard Airport (FAA LID: 8G1) is a public use airport located 1 nautical mile south of Willard, Ohio.

== History ==
The airport, owned by Lee Wilcox and Kenneth Heiser began operations in August 1944 with a class of 50 student pilots. Runway lighting was added in November 1947. Construction of a prefabricated hangar was announced in August 1948. A flying cub was established at the airport in June 1951.

The airport was purchased by Art Heck, the owner of a local dry cleaners, in 1958.

The city council stated Willard did not want to financially support a proposed Huron County Airport in 1965 due to the existence of the airport. However, at the same time, the airport owner offered to donate the land to the county if the county airport would be located there.

The airport was struck by a tornado on 10 May 1973, destroying a hangar and damaging several aircraft.

Eventually, R.R. Donnelley & Sons Company stated that it would expand its factory in the city if improvements were made to the airport. Heck donated the airport to the city which then applied for and received a grant from the state to lengthen the runway to 4,025 feet (1,227 m) in January 1978. The extension was dedicated on 31 October 1980. However, a subsequent request for a federal grant for preparatory work to expand the airport was turned down March 1984 due to a lack of funds. When the city applied for the grant the following year, the federal government again refused to provide funding, although this time it was due to a requirement for the airport to be relocated.

== Facilities and aircraft ==
=== Facilities ===
Willard Airport has one runway, designated 10/28 with an asphalt surface measuring 4,028 by 65 feet (1,228 x 20 m).

The airport does not have a fixed-base operator. Parking includes tie-downs for visiting aircraft. Fuel service offers 100LL.

=== Aircraft ===
Based on the 12-month period ending 28 July 2021, the airport had 515 aircraft operations, an average of 43 per month. This includes 97% general aviation, and 3% military.

For the same time period, no aircraft were based on the field.

== See also ==
- List of airports in Ohio
