= KAMT =

KAMT may refer to:

- KAMT (FM), a radio station (105.1 FM) licensed to serve Channing, Texas, United States
- KAMT-LP, a defunct television station (channel 50) formerly licensed to serve Amarillo, Texas
- KKMO, a radio station (1360 AM) licensed to serve Tacoma, Washington, United States, which held the call sign KAMT from 1983 to 1997
- Alexander Salamon Airport (ICAO code KAMT)
