= Hardin County Airport =

- IATA: none; ICAO: none; FAA LID: I95

Summary
- Airport type: Public
- Owner: Hardin County Airport Authority
- Location: Kenton, Ohio
- Time zone: UTC−05:00 (-5)
  - Summer (DST): UTC−04:00 (-4)
- Elevation AMSL: 1,029 ft (314 m)
- Coordinates: 40°36′38″N 083°38′38″W

Map
- Location of airport in Ohio I95 (the United States)

Runways
Direction	Length		Surface
Direction	ft	m	Surface
04/22	4,797	1,462	Asphalt

Statistics (2022)
- Aircraft operations (year ending 6/22/2022): 7,342
- Based aircraft: 18
- Source: Federal Aviation Administration

Hardin County Airport (FAA LID: I95) is a public airport located three miles southwest of Kenton, Ohio, United States. It is owned and operated by the Hardin County Airport Authority.

== History ==
Fundraising for an airport in Hardin County began in late September 1965 and within a month, $20,000 had been collected. By mid January 1966, just under 68 acres (28 ha) of land had been purchased for the airport. That March, the county hired a contractor to design the airport. By the end of the month, a $25,000 donation by Rockwell-Standard had brought the total within to just under $11,000 of the $75,000 goal. Funding for the airport was approved by the state in mid June 1966. An additional approximately 42 acres (17 ha) was purchased for the airport in mid October. Land was swapped in December to permit the construction of a township road. A six unit t-hangar with an administration section was ordered in late March 1967. The airport was dedicated on 1 October 1968.

In 2021, the airport received a federal grant from the bipartisan infrastructure act to upgrade its facilities.

== Facilities and aircraft ==
Hardin County Airport covers an area of 110 acres (45 ha) which contains one runway designated 04/22 with a 4,797 ft × 75 ft (1,462 m × 23 m) asphalt pavement.

For the 12-month period ending June 22, 2022, the airport had 7,342 aircraft operations, average 20 per day: 91% general aviation, 9% air taxi, and <1% military.

The airport has a fixed-base operator that sells fuel and offers basic amenities.

== Accidents and incidents ==
- On 30 January 1970, a twin engine airplane was destroyed by fire at the airport.
- On September 22, 2001, a Piper PA-22 was damaged during a precautionary landing at the Hardin County Airport. The plane was being ferried from the Huntington Municipal Airport in Indiana to the Valley Point Airport in West Virginia when it diverted to Hardin for weather. The plane touched down normally, but the pilot applied the handbrake while decelerating, causing the airplane to pull from side to side. For fear of overrunning the runway, the pilot decided to force the airplane to a grassy area to the right of the runway, where the nose wheel struck a culvert. The nose wheel collapsed and the airplane nosed over. The pilot reported that the brakes were functioning but seemed to be activating from side to side; a mechanic reported that, while the airplane was in a hangar waiting transportation, he applied the handbrake and then tried to push the airplane, which did not move. The probable cause of the accident was found to be the pilot's failure to stop the airplane within the available runway. Factors included the uneven braking and the pilot's lack of experience in airplane make and model.

== See also ==
- List of airports in Ohio
