= Troy Airport (disambiguation) =

Troy Airport may refer to:

- Troy Airport in Troy, Montana, United States (FAA: 57S)
- Troy Municipal Airport in Troy, Alabama, United States (FAA/IATA: TOI)
- Troy Skypark in Troy, Ohio, United States (FAA: 37I)
- Oakland/Troy Airport in Troy, Michigan, United States (FAA: VLL)
