= Warren Airport (Ohio) =

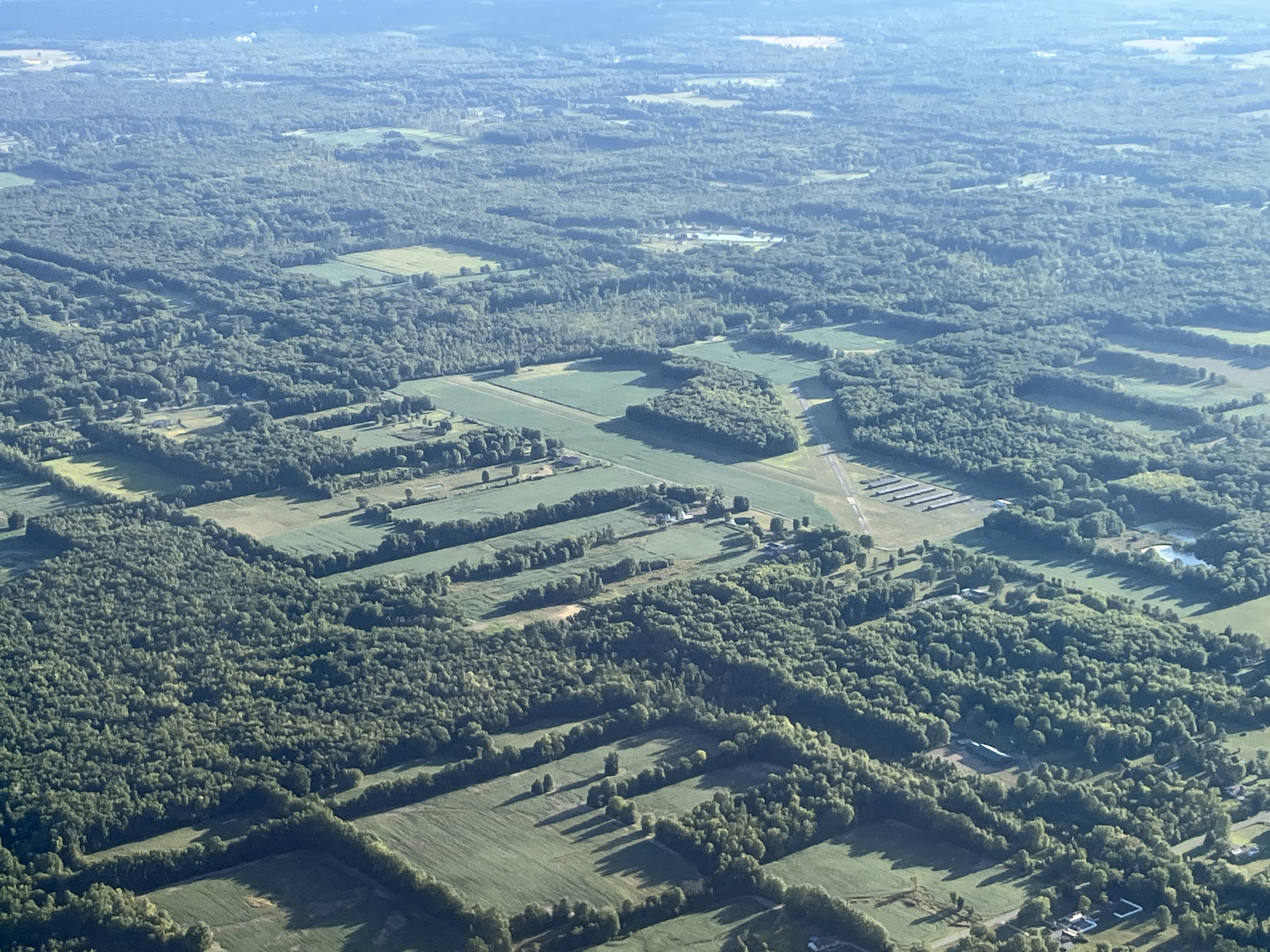
- View of 900m above the airport
- IATA: none; ICAO: none; FAA LID: 62D

Summary
- Airport type: Public use
- Owner: Skeets Airport Inc.
- Serves: Warren, Ohio
- Elevation AMSL: 905 ft / 276 m
- Coordinates: 41°16′01″N 080°55′38″W

Map
- Location of airport in Ohio 62D (the United States)

Runways
Direction	Length		Surface
Direction	ft	m	Surface
4/22	2,907	886	Asphalt
18/36	2,700	823	Turf

Statistics (2021)
- Aircraft operations (year ending 7/10/2021): 7,300
- Based aircraft: 0
- Source: Federal Aviation Administration

Warren Airport (FAA LID: 62D) is a privately owned, public use airport located five nautical miles (6 mi, 9 km) northwest of the central business district of Warren, a city in Trumbull County, Ohio, United States. It is included in the National Plan of Integrated Airport Systems for 2011–2015, which categorized it as a general aviation facility.

== Facilities and aircraft ==
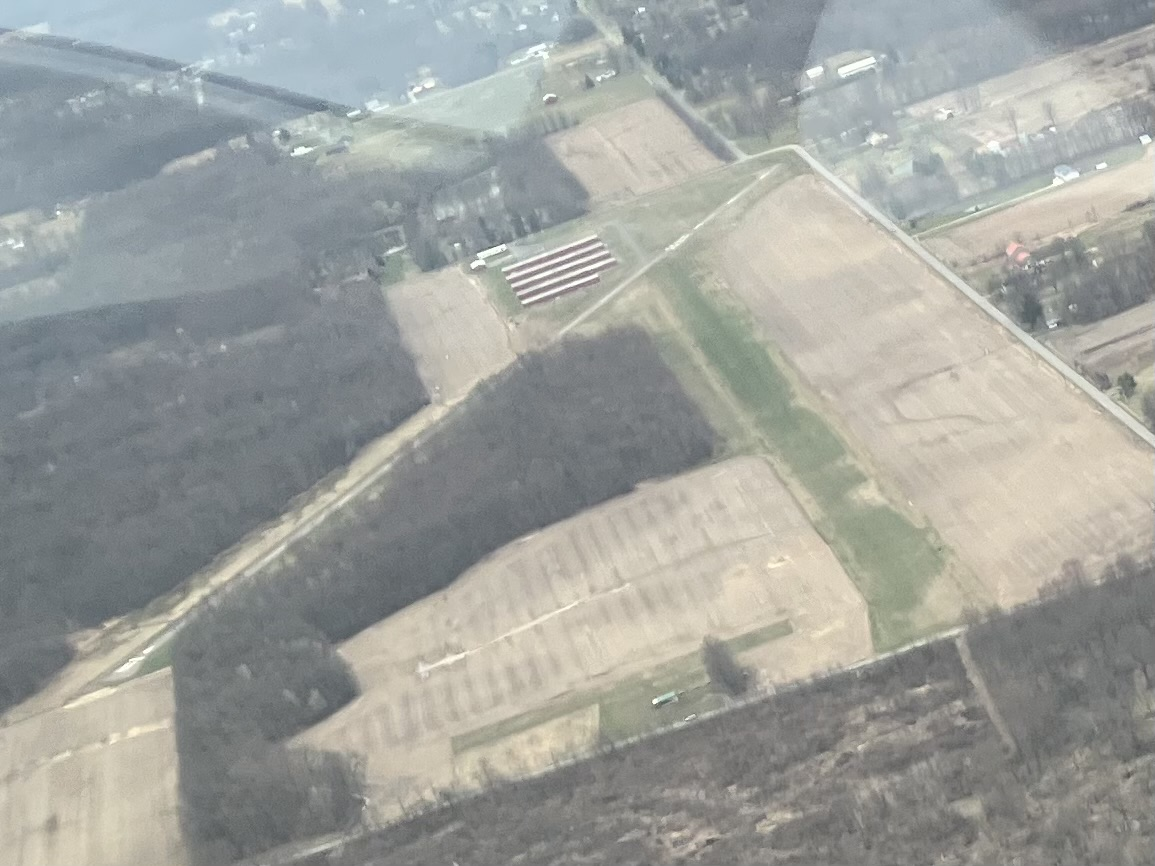
Airport from 2,500 ft above the ground

Warren Airport covers an area of 135 acres (55 ha) at an elevation of 905 feet (276 m) above mean sea level. It has two runways: 4/22 is 2,907 by 30 feet (886 x 9 m) with an asphalt surface and 18/36 is 2,700 by 140 feet (823 x 43 m) with a turf surface.

The airport has a fixed-base operator that sells fuel.

For the 12-month period ending July 10, 2021, the airport had 7,300 general aviation aircraft operations, an average of 20 per day.

== See also ==
- List of airports in Ohio
