= Gates Airport =

- IATA: none; ICAO: none; FAA LID: 7D8

Summary
- Airport type: Public use
- Owner: Cleveland Parachute Center
- Serves: Garrettsville, Ohio
- Elevation AMSL: 1,110 ft (340 m)
- Coordinates: 41°21′04″N 081°05′58″W

Map
- Location of airport in Ohio 7D8 (the United States)

Runways
Direction	Length		Surface
Direction	ft	m	Surface
8/26	2,800	853	Turf/gravel

Statistics (2010)
- Aircraft operations: 4,200
- Source: Federal Aviation Administration

Gates Airport (FAA LID: 7D8) is a public use airport in Geauga County, Ohio, United States. It is located four nautical miles (5 mi, 7 km) north of the central business district of Garrettsville, a village in Portage County, Ohio. The airport is privately owned by the Cleveland Parachute Center and managed by Robert Gates.

== Facilities and aircraft ==
Gates Airport covers an area of 146 acres (59 ha) at an elevation of 1,110 feet (338 m) above mean sea level. It has one runway designated 8/26 with a turf and gravel surface measuring 2,800 by 100 feet (853 x 30 m).

The airport does not have a fixed-base operator.

For the 12-month period ending September 9, 2010, the airport had 4,200 general aviation aircraft operations, an average of 11 per day.

== See also ==
- List of airports in Ohio
