= Weltzien Skypark =

Public use airport in Medina County, Ohio

Weltzien Skypark Airport
- IATA: none; ICAO: none; FAA LID: 15G

Summary
- Owner/Operator: Joel Kull
- Serves: Wadsworth, Ohio
- Location: Medina County, Ohio
- Opened: 1965
- Time zone: UTC−05:00 (-5)
  - Summer (DST): UTC−04:00 (-4)
- Elevation AMSL: 1,210 ft (370 m)
- Coordinates: 41°01′42″N 081°47′53″W
- Website: https://www.flyskypark.com/

Map
- Location of airport in Ohio 15G (the United States)

Runways
Direction	Length		Surface
Direction	ft	m	Surface
3/21	2,410	735	Asphalt

Statistics (2020)
- Aircraft movements: 74,460

Weltzien Skypark (FAA LID: 15G) is a privately owned, public use airport located 3 miles west of Wadsworth, Ohio, United States, in Medina County. The airpark sits on 26 acres at an elevation of 1210 feet.

The airport is denoted as an Ohio Historical Site.

It is home to a chapter of the Experimental Aircraft Association. Besides hosting regular meetings, the chapter and its members build and restore aircraft; provide flight training scholarships; offer free airplane rides; and hold events such as workshops, seminars, cookouts, and fly-ins. The chapter has a dedicated hangar at the Skypark and two vintage airplanes.

== History ==
The airpark was founded in 1965, when the Williams Farm on Acme Hill built a runway with taxiways extending to each house.

== Facilities and aircraft ==
The airport has one runway, designated as runway 3/21. It measures 2410 x 37 feet (735 x 11 m). For the 12-month period ending July 21, 2020, the airport has 74,460 aircraft operations per year, an average of 204 per day. This includes nearly 100% general aviation, <1% air taxi, and <1% military. For the same time period, 107 aircraft were based at the airport: 105 single-engine and 2 multi-engine airplanes.

The airport has a fixed-base operator that sells fuel and has limited amenities.

== Accidents and incidents ==
- On May 30, 1998, a Cessna 170B was substantially damaged during an intentional ground loop during the landing roll at the Weltzien Skypark. After two unsuccessful power-off landing attempts at a short field, the certified flight instructor took control of the tail wheel airplane to demonstrate the proper technique. The airplane drifted right on touchdown, and the CFI responded with left rudder. The CFI reported that the rudder would move only about 1 inch, when it suddenly 'let go,' and full left rudder was applied. The airplane immediately went left, and with little remaining runway, the CFI kicked 'full right rudder to intentionally ground loop the airplane.' The probable cause of the accident was found to be the flight instructor's failure to maintain control of the airplane which resulted in his intentional ground loop.
- On July 12, 2002, a homebuilt Zodiac CH 601-H was substantially damaged when it collided with terrain during a takeoff at Weltzien Skypark. The preflight runup was reportedly normal, and the aircraft accelerated and lifted off as normal during takeoff. However, after liftoff and acceleration in ground effect, the airplane would not climb. The airplane sank, struck the tail, continued off the departure end of the runway, crossed a road, and came to rest between trees. An instructor pilot in another aircraft stated that, though the runway used by the accident airplane had been in use most of the day, winds had started heavily favoring the opposite runway as the accident aircraft taxied for departure. The probable cause of the accident was found to be the pilot's overrotation after takeoff, which resulted in an inadvertent stall/mush. A factor was the pilot's decision to take off with a tailwind.
- On June 7, 2005, a Piper PA-44 Seminole was substantially damaged during an aborted takeoff from the Weltzien Skypark Airport. The student pilot was attempting a short-field takeoff. As the student pilot began the takeoff roll, the flight instructor reduced the right engine throttle to simulate an engine failure. The student pilot reduced the left engine throttle and began braking. The flight instructor then instructed the student pilot to resume the takeoff, and the student pilot advanced both throttles forward. The airplane accelerated normally but would not lift off, and the flight instructor elected to abort the takeoff. The airplane was about halfway down the runway when the flight instructor retarded the throttle, propeller, and mixture controls, and began braking. The instructor then realized the engines were still producing power, and by the time he reached for the throttles, the aircraft could not stop on remaining runway. The probable cause of the accident was found to be the flight instructor's failure to verify that the engine controls were completely retarded during an aborted takeoff, which resulted in a runway overrun.
- On July 26, 2006, a Cessna 172 Skyhawk collided with a guard rail and an embankment during an aborted takeoff at the Weltzien Skypark. Winds heavily favored the opposite runway, so the student pilot was departing with a tailwind even though no other planes were in the pattern. The pilot's instructor made a radio call during the plane's takeoff roll to inform the pilot she was using the wrong runway. Though the student attempted to abort the takeoff, she later said it was the wrong decision, as she would have been able to take off in the runway remaining. Regardless, the student hit the brakes but forgot to retard the throttle or lean the mixture. The airplane continued off the end of the runway where it contacted a guard rail at full power. The airplane then nosed over and came to rest approximately 25 feet down an embankment. The probable cause of the accident was found to be the student pilot's improper aborted takeoff procedure.
- On September 4, 2008, a Cessna 150L collided with a truck while landing at the Weltzien Skypark. The aircraft was returning from a local instructional flight when the truck entered the runway while the Cessna was finishing its landing roll. The plane's wing impacted the truck while the pilots were attempting a go-around to avoid a collision. The truck driver did not have an available radio to receive and provide traffic advisories. The probable cause of the accident was found to be the lack of radio communication with the airplane and the inadequate visual lookout by the driver of the vehicle.
- On September 19, 2008, a Cessna 172 Skyhawk was damaged while landing at the Weltzien Skypark. The approach was fast, the aircraft touched down past the midfield yellow marking. The pilot reported that as he passed the yellow line, he was concerned that if he performed a go-around, he would not be able to clear the trees at the end of the runway so he elected to continue the landing. The airplane traveled off the end of the runway, through a barricade, and down sloping terrain where it nosed over. The probable cause of the accident was found to be the pilot's excessive airspeed during the approach and landing and failure to perform a go-around.
- On September 22, 2011, a Cessna 172N Skyhawk was damaged while landing at the Weltzien Skypark. The aircraft bounched after touchdown and began to veer to the left. The pilot released the left brake and applied more right brake to straighten the airplane. The airplane continued off the end of the runway where it contacted a ditch. The probable cause of the accident was found to be the pilot's misjudgment of his speed and distance, which resulted in an overrun.
- On October 8, 2011, a Piper PA-28 impacted the visual approach slope indicator equipment while landing at the Weltzien Skypark. After touchdown, the pilot applied the brakes to slow the airplane to exit the runway and "nothing happened." The airplane departed the runway surface, and the right wing contacted the visual approach slope indicator (VASI) system. The airplane came to rest upright adjacent to the runway. The probable cause of the accident was found to be the failure of the brake system during the landing roll, which was caused by a loss of hydraulic fluid as a result of a leak in the piston seal due to brake plates worn beyond their service limits.
- On September 24, 2013, a Cessna 152 crashed during an attempted go-around at the Weltzien Skypark. The pilot did not feel in a position to land and initiated the go-around but was unable to climb or maintain altitude. The airplane settled to the ground 200 yards past the runway's departure end. The probable cause of the accident was found to be the pilot's failure to adequately maintain airspeed during a go-around.
- On May 27, 2014, a Cessna 120 was damaged while landing at the Weltzien Skypark. During rollout, the instructor advised the student to lower the tail to eliminate tail rudder effectiveness. At that time, the student applied brakes causing the airplane to skid off the right side of the runway. The airplane overturned and came to rest inverted approximately 4 feet of the runway edge. The probable cause was found to be the pilot's failure to maintain directional control of the airplane during landing, which resulted in a runway excursion.
- On July 28, 2018, a Cessna 172 Skyhawk crashed while landing at Weltzien Skypark. The pilot reported his approach speed was fast and that, during the landing roll, the wind pushed the airplane off the runway to the right. He added that he did not apply full braking action. The probable cause of the accident was found to be the pilot's failure to maintain directional control during landing.
- On October 14, 2020, a Cessna 152 made an emergency landing after departing the Weltzien Skypark.
- On August 11, 2021, a Cessna 150M sustained substantial damage after takeoff from Weltzien Skypark. After a normal run-up, a pilot performed a short-field takeoff by holding the brakes and applying full power before beginning the takeoff roll. Shortly after takeoff, the airplane was not climbing normally, the stall horn activated, and engine RPMs significantly decreased. The pilot established best glide speed and attempted a soft-field landing to a corn field. After touchdown, the airplane nosed over, and the fuselage, vertical stabilizer, and rudder sustained substantial damage. The probable cause of the accident was found to be a partial loss of engine power due to carburetor icing and the pilot's failure to apply carburetor heat when the power loss occurred.
- On April 28, 2022, a Cessna 152 flipped over in the grass between Weltzien Skypark's runway and a taxiway. The pilot was reportedly trying to land the plane when it went off the left side of the runway and flipped.
- On June 29, 2022, a 2018 Vans aircraft overran the runway while landing at Weltzien Skypark. The aircraft had a mechanical issue while landing and continued off the north end of the runway, struck a guard rail, and overturned.

== See also ==
- List of airports in Ohio
