= Eddie Dew Memorial Airpark =

Privately owned airport near Toronto, Ohio, U.S.

- IATA: none; ICAO: none; FAA LID: 1G8

Summary
- Airport type: Public
- Owner: Private
- Operator: Rich Jeffers
- Serves: Toronto, Ohio
- Location: Knox Township, Ohio
- Elevation AMSL: 1,084 ft (330 m)
- Coordinates: 40°28′33.2″N 080°37′41.3″W

Map
- Location of airport in Ohio 1G8 (the United States)

Runways
Direction	Length		Surface
Direction	ft	m	Surface
16/34	2,268	691	Turf

Statistics (2008)
- Aircraft operations: 26,280
- Based aircraft: 22
- Source: Federal Aviation Administration

Eddie Dew Memorial Airpark (FAA LID: 1G8), is a privately owned airport near Toronto, Ohio, U.S., part of the Pittsburgh Combined Statistical Area. The airport opened in December 1937.

In 2009, flight restrictions were imposed at the airport due to the 2009 G-20 Pittsburgh summit.

== Facilities and aircraft ==
The airport has one runway. Designated as Runway 17/35, it measures 2268 x 145 ft (691 x 44 m) and is turf.

Twenty-two aircraft are reported as being based at the airport; approximately 2,850 aircraft movements per year take place.

== Accidents and incidents ==
- On December 17, 2005, a Piper PA-22 crashed during takeoff from the Eddie Dew Memorial Airpark. The airplane swerved during takeoff roll on a snow-covered runway and subsequently nosed over after dragging its left wingtip. The pilot stated that during the takeoff roll he attempted to follow the tire tracks left in the snow by a previous airplane. The pilot decided during the takeoff roll that the airplane could not take off, and he attempted to abort. However, during that process, the airplane swerved left, dragged its left wing tip, and nosed over. The probable cause of the accident was found to be the pilot's decision to depart from the snow-covered runway, which resulted in the swerve during takeoff roll and subsequent nose over.
- On July 18, 2009, a Foglio Tiger Cup crashed after takeoff from the Eddie Dew Memorial Airpark. On his second takeoff of the day, the pilot reported the airplane was not climbing, and engine power was low. The aircraft clipped a tree, and the pilot elected to land in a nearby field. The probable cause of the accident was found to be the pilot's failure to turn off carburetor heat prior to takeoff, resulting in reduced engine performance.

== See also ==
- List of airports in Ohio
