= Delaware Municipal Airport =

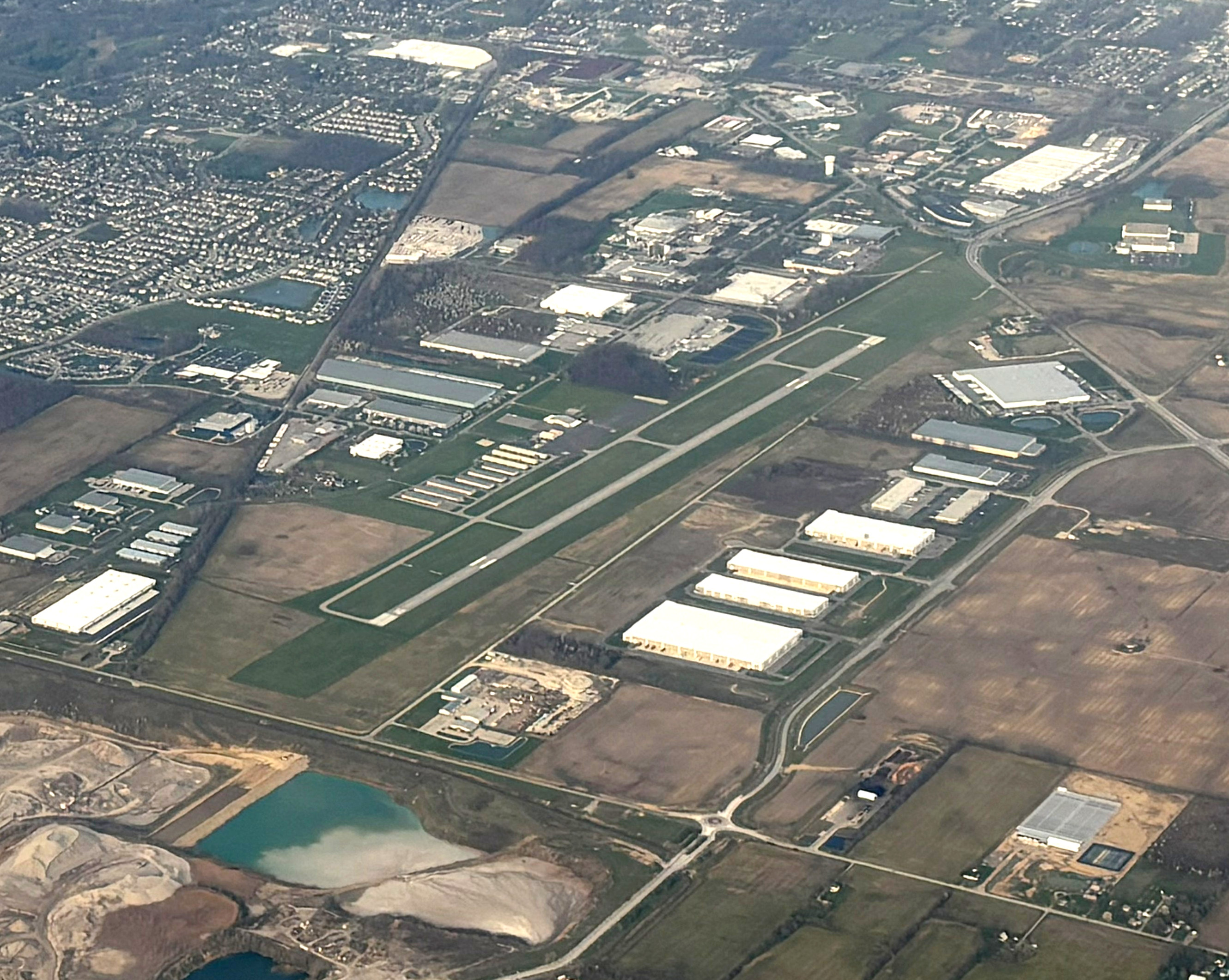
- IATA: none; ICAO: KDLZ; FAA LID: DLZ

Summary
- Airport type: Public
- Owner: City of Delaware
- Location: Delaware, Ohio
- Elevation AMSL: 945 ft (288 m)
- Coordinates: 40.27991°N 83.11195°W
- Website: www.delawareohio.net/government/departments/airport

Map
- Location of airport in Ohio DLZ (the United States)

Runways
| Direction | Length | | Surface |
| Direction | ft | m | Surface |
|---|---|---|---|
| 10/28 | 5,800 | 1,768 | Asphalt |

Statistics (2020)
- Aircraft operations (year ending 9/22/2020): 39,300
- Based aircraft: 93
- Source: Federal Aviation Administration

Delaware Municipal Airport, also known as Jim Moore Field, (ICAO: KDLZ, FAA LID: DLZ) is a public airport located three miles (5 km) southwest of downtown Delaware, Ohio, United States. It is owned and operated by the City of Delaware.

== History ==
The airport was originally built by E. J. Fitchhorn in the 1940s. The city purchased 225 acres (91 ha) in May 1945 and began construction on the airport that fall. A new east-west paved runway was closed in April 1952 due to its unfinished condition. A new airport manager, Henry Miller, took over operation of the airport in August 1952.

The city approved the sale of 179 acres (72 ha) airport land in mid May 1967 to help finance improvements at the airport. It received approval for a state grant in mid June. Ground was broken on a project to extend the runway from 2,000 feet (610 m) to 4,100 feet (1,200 m) in July. The airport was dedicated on 1 October 1967.

In August 1974, Flxible announced plans to move its headquarters to land adjacent to the airport and suggested that it might use the runway to bring in material.

The airport manager and four employees were laid off in May 1976. Construction of t-hangars and a maintenance building were still not complete by late August 1977. By mid October 1977, the fixed-base operator was behind in payments to the city. A new fixed-base operator, Flyers Service Corporation, took over management of the airport in May 1978. The airport submitted a request for a state grant to repave the runway in June 1980.

By early June 1981, the airport began considering future plans to attract commuter and freight flights. Work on a proper master plan had started by mid July 1983. Four months later, five options were ready to be presented to the public. However, the plan, originally intended to be completed by October 1984, eventually ended up being delayed until at least February 1986. Meanwhile, by early June 1985, the city warned the fixed-base operator that it might be evicted after it failed to pay rent for three years. In October, a local resident began collecting signatures to put an issue related to the funding of airport expansion before the city council.

A plan to expand the airport northward was met with opposition by three nearby businesses when it was revealed in February 1987 that they would be forced to sell parts of their properties. The city met with the companies the following month. As a result of the meeting three new plans were proposed. Eventually, a plan to shift the entire runway 230 feet (70 m) south and an additional distance west was selected. Other changes included moving three hangars and two buildings were to the north side of the runway and lengthening a nearby road westward by 1,100 feet (340 m) to provide access to the new location. The new plan was submitted to the FAA for approval in late July. After a few minor changes, including shifting the proposed runway slightly farther south, the city council voted to approve the plan in late September. A prospective FM radio tower east of the airport raised concerns in December that it would pose an obstruction to aircraft. Ground was broken on the project in July 1988. The airport manager alleged that the airport was trying to remove him in March 1990.

The first half of a hangar was towed across the airport in late May 1996. A new airport manager, the first one to be paid, was hired in August 1994. Two months later, Delo Scew Products donated its 4,000 sq ft (370 m^{2}) hangar to the airport and it was moved across the runway. CMH Aviation assumed maintenance for the airport in November 1995. The airport received a federal grant for a new 5,000 feet (1,500 m) runway in May 1997.

Less than two years after one consultant proposed privatizing the airport in 1999, a second advocated against it. A plan to share joint ownership of the airport with the county was rejected in March 2003. A proposal was made to build a 22,000 sq ft (2,000 m^{2}) hangar at the airport that July. The following February an arbitrator ruled against the city after it failed to provide space for a leaseholder.

The subtitle Jim Moore Field had been added to the airport's name by late January 2012.

A contract to extend the runway to 5,800 feet (1,800 m) had been signed by late January 2016. The project had been delayed due to a misunderstanding over the permissible width of the taxiways.

== Facilities and aircraft ==
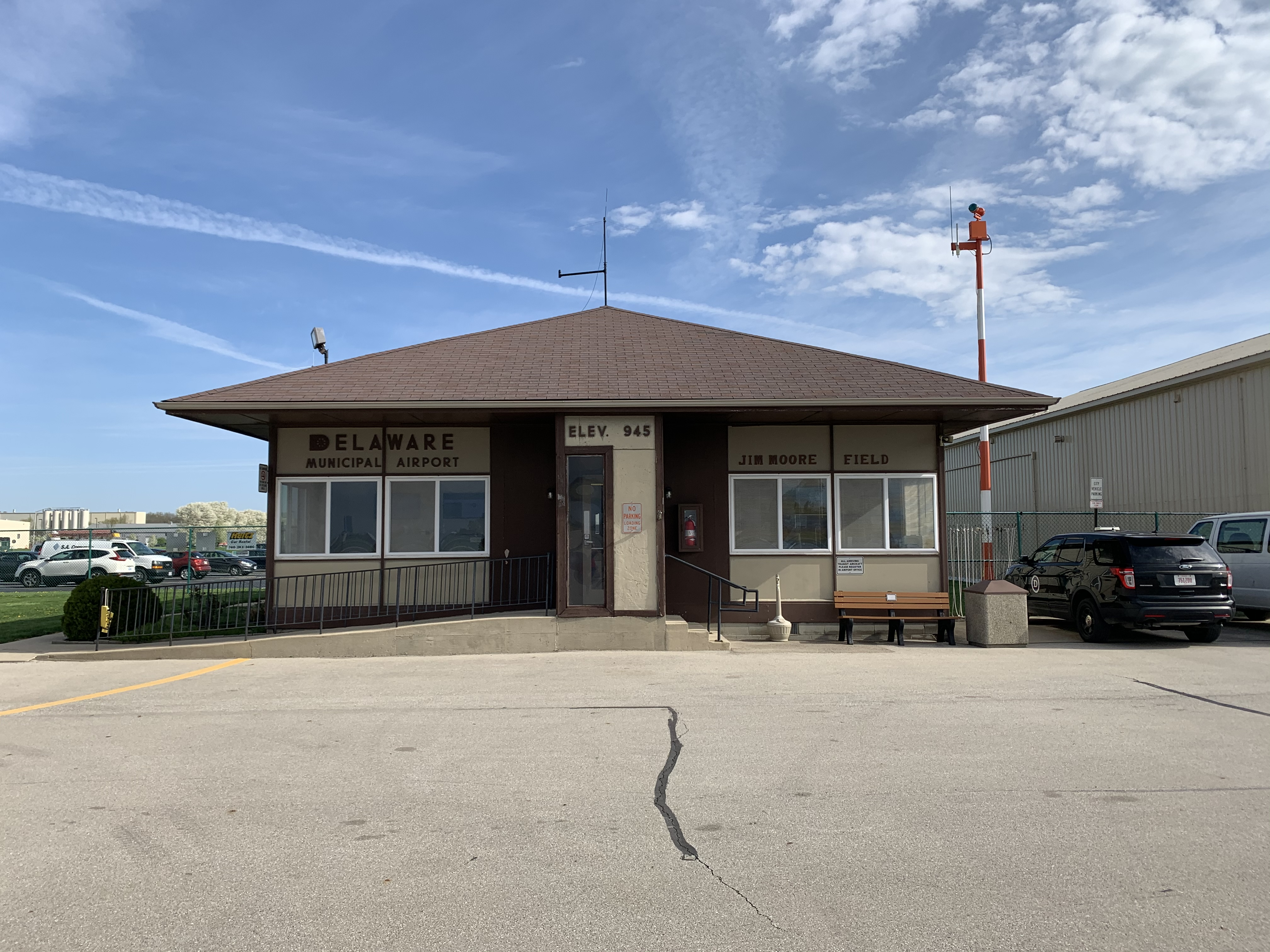
Main building, airside

Delaware Municipal Airport covers an area of 325 acres (132 ha) which contains one runway designated 10/28 with a 5,800 ft × 100 ft (1,768 m × 30 m) asphalt pavement.

For the 12-month period ending September 22, 2020, the airport had 39,300 aircraft operations, an average of 108 per day: 92% general aviation and 8% air taxi.

The airport has a fixed-base operator that sells fuel, both avgas and jetfuel, and offers amenities such as catering, hangars, internet, a crew lounge, snooze rooms, rental cars, and more.

== Accidents and incidents ==
- On 26 March 1961, a Ryan Navion operated by the Ohio Wing of the Civil Air Patrol crashed shortly after taking off from the airport due to engine failure, injuring two passengers.
- On December 20, 2019, a Flight Design CTSW Light Sport aircraft crashed at the Delaware Municipal Airport. The pilot was on his first solo.

== See also ==
- List of airports in Ohio
