= Salem Airpark =

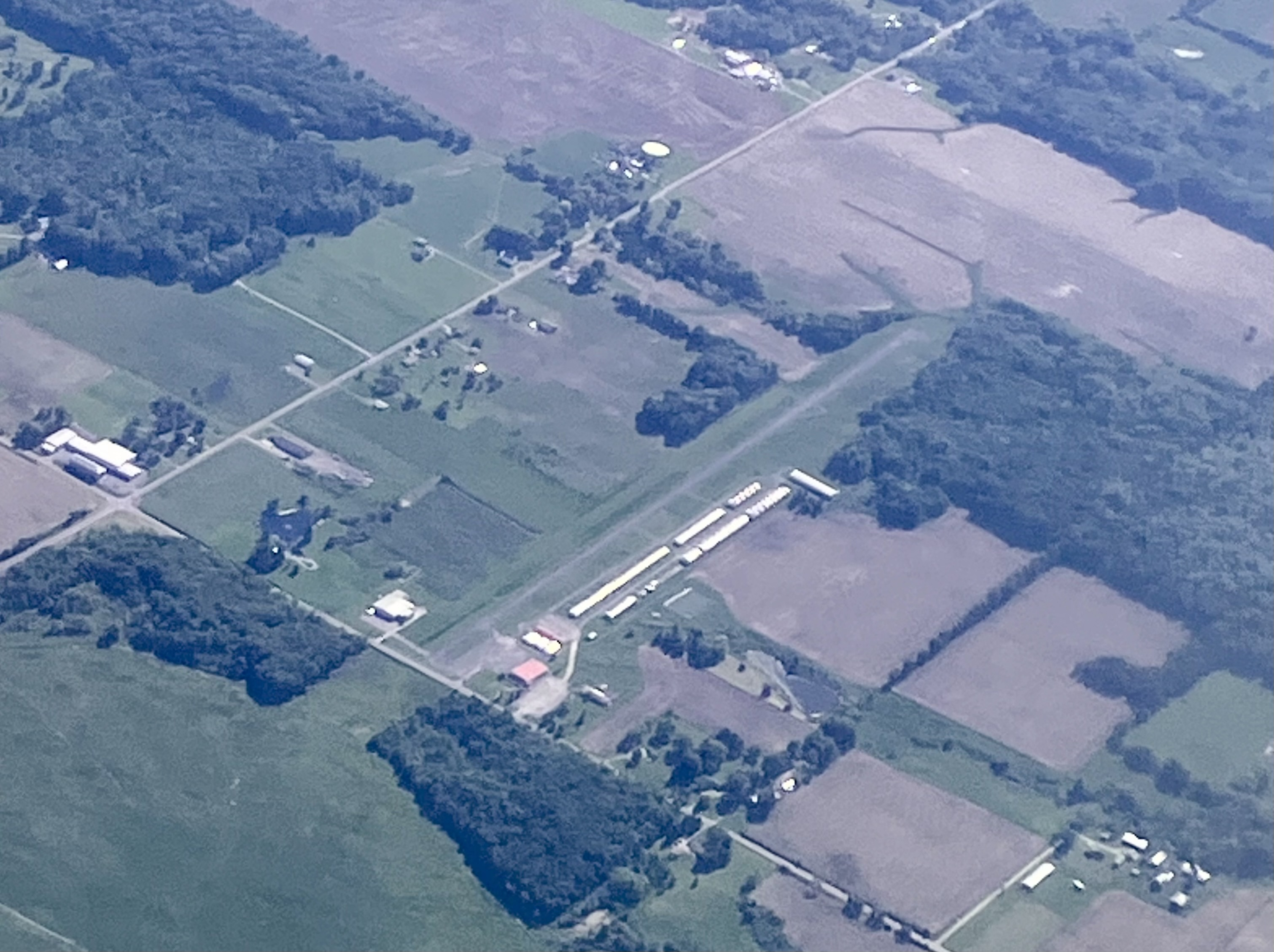
- IATA: none; ICAO: none; FAA LID: 38D

Summary
- Airport type: privately owned, publicly used
- Owner: SALEM AIRPARK LLC
- Serves: Salem, Ohio
- Elevation AMSL: 1,162 ft (354 m)
- Coordinates: 40°56′53″N 080°51′44″W

Map
- Location of airport in Ohio 38D (the United States)

Runways
Direction	Length		Surface
Direction	ft	m	Surface
10L/28R	3,404	1,038	Asphalt
10R/28L	2,593	790	Turf

Statistics (2024)
- Aircraft operations: 5,800
- Based aircraft: 58
- Source: Federal Aviation Administration

Salem Airpark or Salem Air Park (FAA LID: 38D) is a public use airport in Mahoning County, Ohio, United States. It is located three nautical miles (6 km) north of the central business district of Salem, Ohio.

== History ==
Between 2005 and 2022, the Salem Airport was owned and operated by Salem Air Park Ltd and Michael and Brenda Pigeon, who purchased it at $529,000. On September 2, 2022, the airport was purchased by Salem Airpark LLC. At $1.43 million.

== Facilities and aircraft ==
Salem Airpark covers an area of 35 acres (14 ha) at an elevation of 1,162 feet (354 m) above mean sea level. It has two runways: 10L/28R is 3,404 by 50 feet (1,038 x 15 m) with an asphalt pavement and 10R/28L is 2,593 by 85 feet (790 x 26 m) with a turf surface.

The airport has a fixed-base operator offering limited amenities.

For the 12-month period ending July 9, 2008, the airport had 16,920 aircraft operations, an average of 46 per day: 95% general aviation, 5% air taxi, and <1% military. At that time there were 78 aircraft based at this airport: 90% single-engine and 10% multi-engine.

For the 12-month period ending October 25, 2023, the airport had 5,800 aircraft operations, an average of 16 per day, all of which were general aviation. There are 58 aircraft based at the airport, all of which are single-engine airplanes.

== Accidents and incidents ==
- On June 9, 2022, a North American T-6 Texan was damaged while landing at the Salem Airpark. The airplane touched down, and about one-third of the way down the runway, it veered sharply to the right, and onto the grass. It continued across the grass and struck an elevated taxiway. A ground loop subsequently occurred. The probable cause of the accident was found to be the pilot's failure to maintain directional control during the landing roll, which resulted in an inadvertent ground loop.
- On September 13, 2007, a Vans RV6 struck a parked truck while landing at the Salem Airpark. The pilot forgot to remove his cowl covers on the preflight inspection, causing an oil temperature increase inflight. After the pilot-rated passenger attempted a landing at Salem, he attempted a go-around; however, the engine did not respond, and the aircraft impacted a truck off the end of the runway. The probable cause of the accident was found to be a loss of engine power due to the blocked cooling and induction systems because of the pilot in command's failure to remove the cowling covers before the flight.
- On May 19, 2011, a Socata TBM850 landed short of the runway at the Salem Airpark after an instrument approach. The pilot reported he thought the airplane was too high about 1/2 mile from the runway but that the aircraft developed a high rate of descent soon after. The pilot was unable to arrest the descent, and the left main landing gear struck the ground about 120 feet prior to the runway threshold. The probable cause of the incident was found to be the pilot's failure to maintain a stabilized glide path which resulted in the airplane touching down short of the runway.

== See also ==
- Lansdowne Airport
- List of airports in Ohio
- Youngstown Elser Metro Airport
- Youngstown Executive Airport
- Youngstown-Warren Regional Airport
