= Lansdowne Airport =

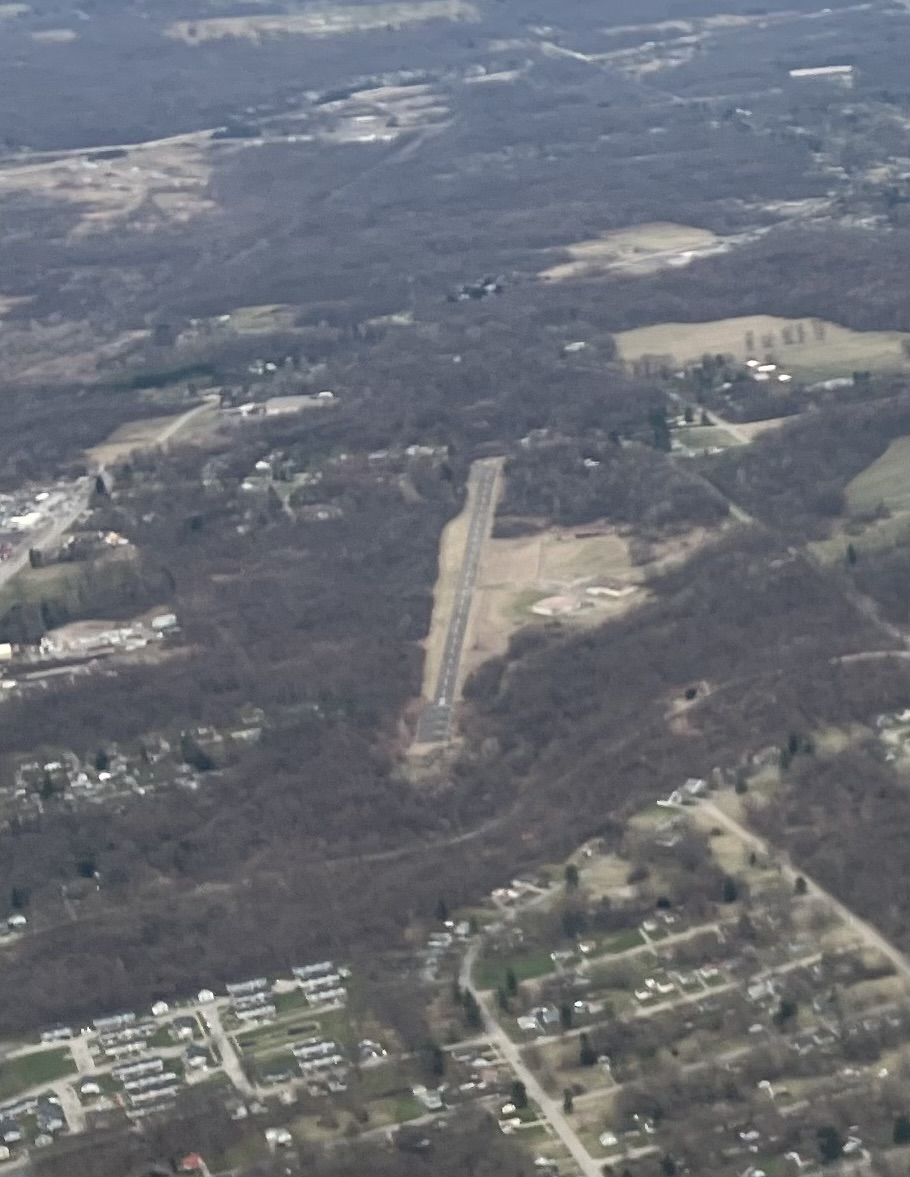
- IATA: none; ICAO: none; FAA LID: 04G

Summary
- Airport type: Public
- Operator: Lansdowne Land Associates
- Location: Youngstown, Ohio
- Time zone: UTC−05:00 (-5)
  - Summer (DST): UTC−04:00 (-4)
- Elevation AMSL: 1,044 ft / 318 m
- Coordinates: 41°07′50″N 080°37′11″W

Map
- Location of airport in Ohio 04G (the United States)

Runways
Direction	Length		Surface
Direction	ft	m	Surface
2/20	3,073	937	Asphalt

Statistics (2021)
- Aircraft Movements: 1,040
- Based Aircraft: 4

Lansdowne Airport (FAA LID: 04G) is a small, local airport on the East Side of Youngstown, Ohio, US near the Pennsylvania state line. Lansdowne Airport is a privately owned airport, located in an area known as the "Sharon Line" to locals, due to its proximity to a defunct train line that once ran from Youngstown to Sharon, right across the state line through the Steel Valleys.

== History ==
The airport was dedicated as Lansdowne Field in late October 1926. It was named for Lieutenant Commander Zachary Lansdowne, an Ohio native and commander of the US Navy airship USS Shenandoah (ZR-1), which crashed in Ava, Ohio, in 1925. Rear Admiral William A. Moffett, then the head of the Navy's Bureau of Aeronautics and champion of airships, was in attendance.

Lansdowne Airport was the first airport in Youngstown and was the first in the region to see airmail service. In 1933, it was the landing point for the Taylor Cub aircraft that held the world endurance record for a light aircraft at the time: 12 hours and 27 minutes.

Lansdowne was Youngstown's only city-operated airport until 1940. Because of the increasing size in airplanes and the lack of a suitable amount of land in the vicinity of Lansdowne, a decision was made to build Youngstown Municipal Airport eleven miles away in Vienna, Ohio.

== Facilities and aircraft ==
The airport has one runway, designated as runway 2/20. It measures 3073 x 50 ft (937 x 15 m). It is paved with asphalt.

The airport does not have a fixed-base operator.

For the 12-month period ending September 24, 2021, the airport had 1,040 aircraft operations, an average of 20 per week. It included 99% general aviation and 1% military. For the same time period, 4 aircraft were based at the airport, all single engine airplanes.

== Accidents and incidents ==
- On August 31, 1996, a Cessna 177 collided with terrain during an aborted landing at Lansdowne Airport. The pilot reported that the approach was normal but fast and that the aircraft bounced three times on the runway. There was not enough time to land after the third bounce, so he applied power to go around. The pilot tried to keep the nose low to gain speed, but it failed to climb and crashed over a cliff. The probable cause of the accident was found to be the pilot's delay in aborting the landing, and his failure to attain adequate airspeed to fly out of ground effect, which resulted in a stall/mush and collision with the ground.

== See also ==
- List of airports in Ohio
- Salem Airpark
- Youngstown Elser Metro Airport
- Youngstown Executive Airport
- Youngstown-Warren Regional Airport
