= Youngstown Elser Metro Airport =

Public use airport in Youngstown, Ohio

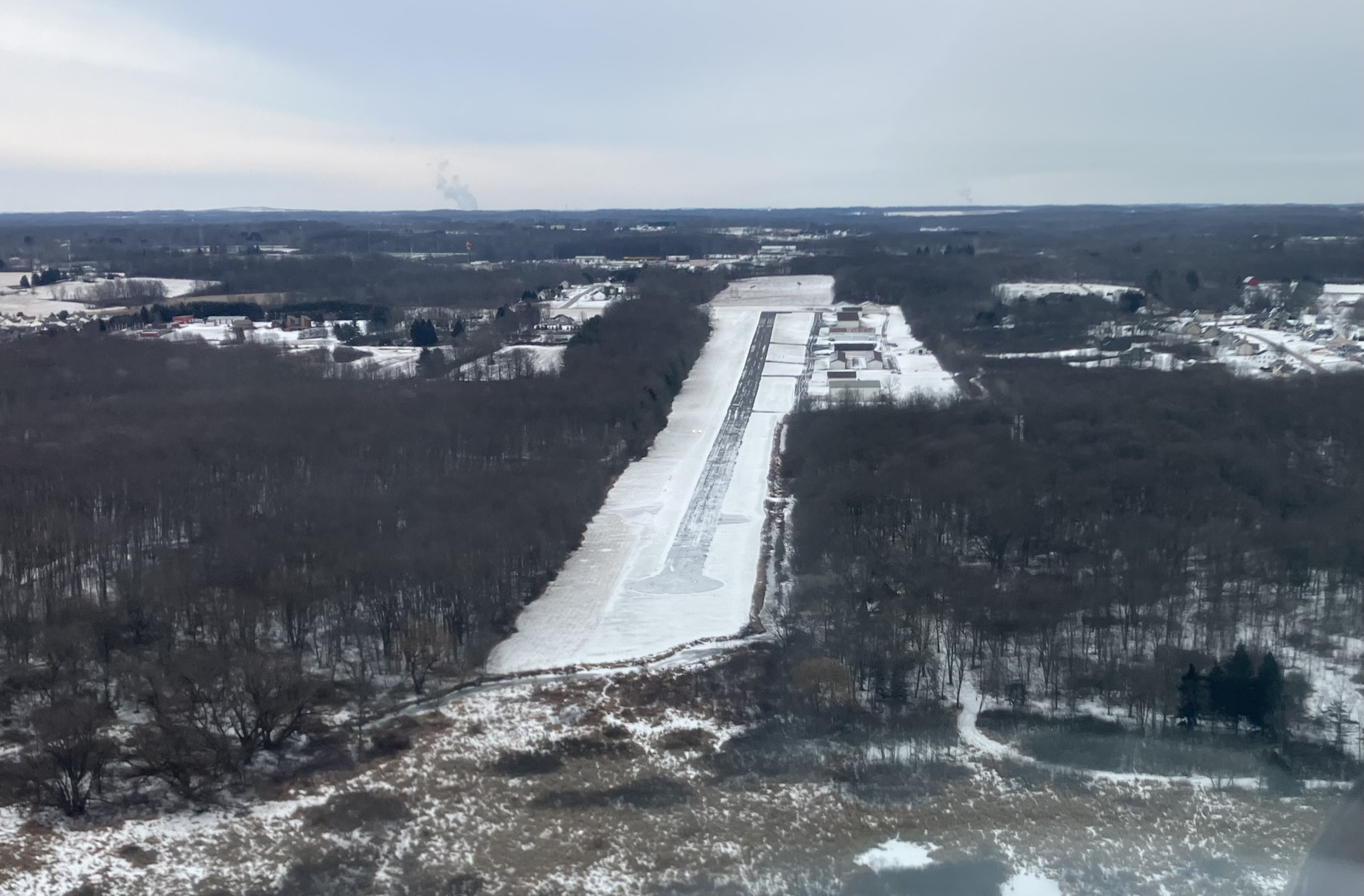
- IATA: none; ICAO: none; FAA LID: 4G4

Summary
- Owner/Operator: Michael E Stanko
- Location: Beaver Township, Mahoning County, Ohio
- Time zone: UTC−05:00 (-5)
  - Summer (DST): UTC−04:00 (-4)
- Elevation AMSL: 1,069.6 ft (326.0 m)
- Coordinates: 40°57′42″N 80°40′38″W

Maps
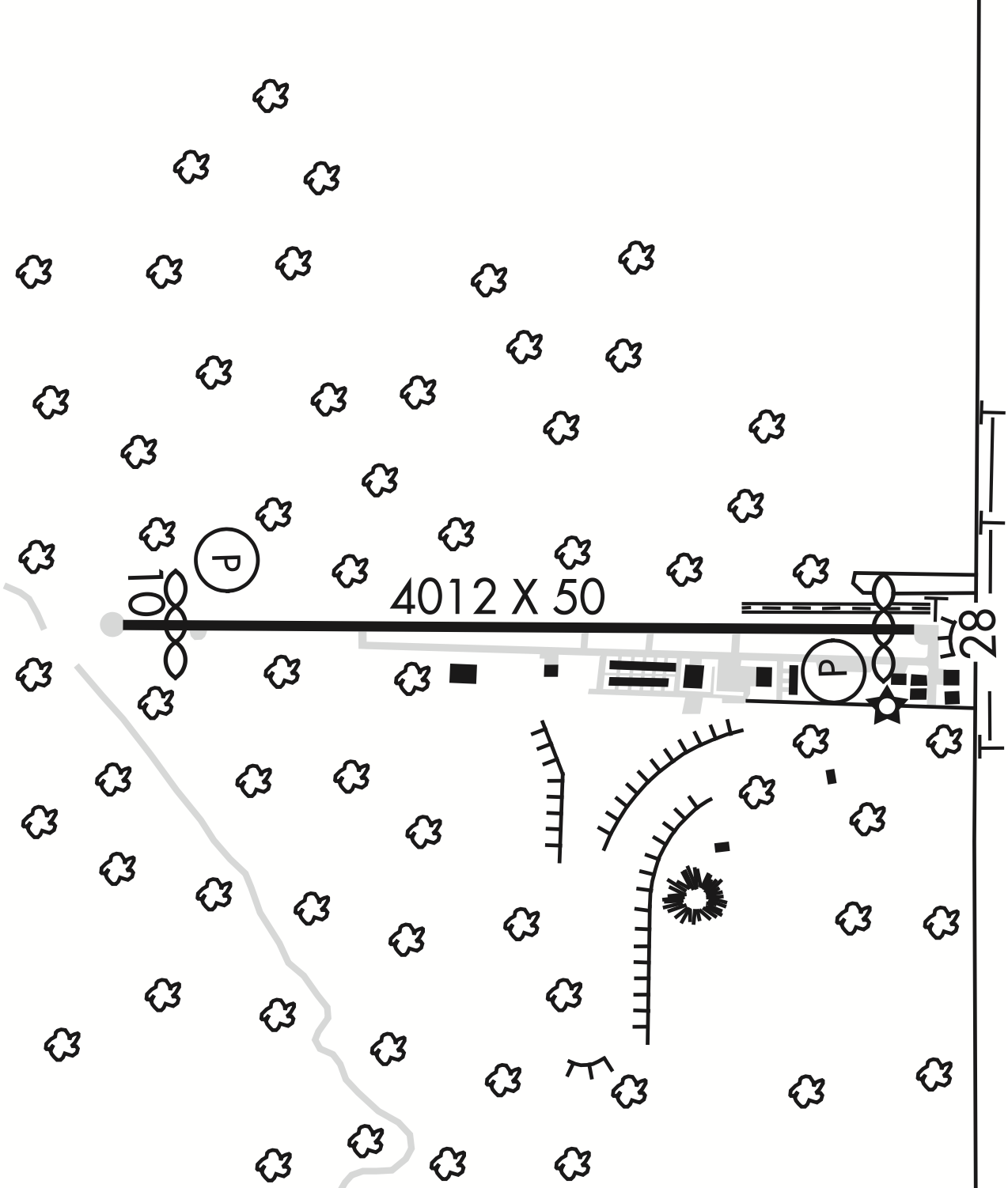

- Location of airport in Ohio 4G4 (the United States)

Runways
Direction	Length		Surface
Direction	ft	m	Surface
10/28	4,012	1,223	Asphalt

Statistics (2021)
- Aircraft Movements: 4,784

The Youngstown Elser Metro Airport (FAA LID: 4G4) is a privately owned, public use general aviation airport located 7 miles southwest of Youngstown in Beaver Township, Mahoning County, Ohio, United States. It has a 10/28 asphalt runway of 4,012 ft × 50 ft (1,223 m × 15 m) in dimension.

== Facilities and aircraft ==
The airport has one runway, designated as runway 10/28. It measures 4012 x 50 ft (1223 x 15 m) and is paved with asphalt.

The airport has a fixed-base operator that sells fuel and offers amenities such as general maintenance, hangars, courtesy transportation, pilot supplies, a crew lounge, snooze rooms, showers, and more.

For the 12-month period ending September 24, 2021, the airport had 4,784 aircraft operations, an average of 92 per week. This included 95% general aviation, 2% air taxi, and 2% military. For the same time period, 72 aircraft were based at the airport: 46 single-engine and 5 multi-engine airplanes, 20 helicopters, and 1 jet.

== Accidents and incidents ==
- On August 1, 1999, a Piper PA-32 Cherokee Six impacted terrain shortly after takeoff from Youngstown Elser Metro Airport. According to the sole surviving passenger, the aircraft had landed at Youngstown to refuel after a long trip in from Wittman Regional Airport in Oshkosh, Wisconsin. The passenger also reported the plane's tail was almost touching the ground while on the ramp with its nose high. After takeoff, the airplane was struggling to climb out, and witnesses report seeing the aircraft attempt a nose-high 180 degree turn back to the airport. The plane lost altitude throughout the turn, and the passenger reported that the aircraft was side slipping as it was descending. The probable cause of the accident was found to be the pilot's loss of control of the airplane during a turn.
- On April 18, 2004, a Piper PA-24 Comanche impacted trees while on approach to the Youngstown Elser Metro Airport. Witnesses the pilot was practicing takeoffs and landings at dusk. The engine reportedly sounded normal the takeoffs before the accident, but the landings preceding the accident appeared low and required the pilot to climb to avoid trees. On the second landing, witnesses reported hearing a sound similar to an impact. The aircraft subsequently entered a steep climb so that witnesses on the ground saw its undercarriage; upon reaching the vertical position, the airplane the cartwheeled and burst into a fireball. The probable cause of the accident was found to be the pilot's failure to maintain a safe altitude clearance from trees.
- On December 21, 2005, a Cessna T210 Centurion sustained substantial damage while landing at the Youngstown Elser Metro Airport. The pilot reported hearing reports of icing nearby and picked up ice on the windshield on approach to land. Thus, the pilot could not see the runway out the front window for much of the approach and only visually identified it when entering the terminal environment. Upon landing, the pilot felt a crosswind hit the airplane and change its direction by 10-15 degrees. The plane was pushed to one side of the runway and touched down on the snow off one edge. The probable cause of the accident was found to be the pilot's failure to maintaining airspeed and directional control during the landing.
- On December 29, 2010, a Rockwell International 114A was substantially damaged after landing at the Youngstown Elser Metro Airport. The pilot stated that the airplane "veered immediately to the left" after touchdown. He applied right rudder and brake, but the aircraft departed the left side of the runway. The pilot continued applying right brake to put the plane into a groundloop to avoid impacting oncoming buildings. The probable cause of the accident was found to be the pilot’s failure to maintain directional control during the landing touchdown.

== See also ==
- Lansdowne Airport
- List of airports in Ohio
- Salem Airpark
- Youngstown Executive Airport
- Youngstown-Warren Regional Airport
