= Greene County–Lewis A. Jackson Regional Airport =

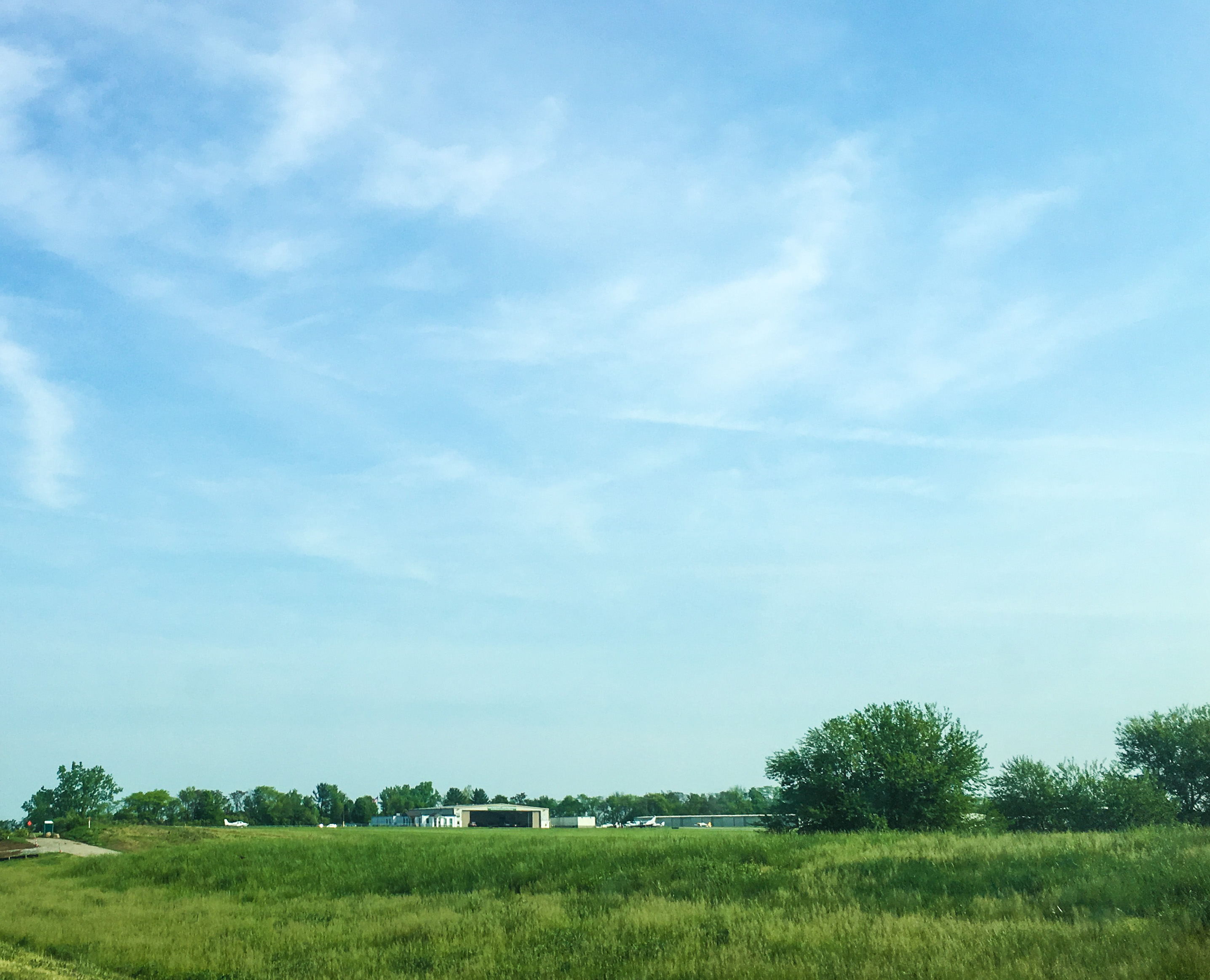
- Greene County–Lewis A. Jackson Regional Airport, May 2018
- IATA: none; ICAO: none; FAA LID: GDK

Summary
- Airport type: Public
- Owner: Greene County Regional Airport Authority
- Serves: Dayton, Ohio
- Location: Xenia, Ohio
- Time zone: UTC−05:00 (-5)
  - Summer (DST): UTC−04:00 (-4)
- Elevation AMSL: 949 ft (289 m)
- Coordinates: 39°41′28″N 083°59′31″W
- Website: www.greenecountyairport.com

Map
- Location of airport in Ohio GDK (the United States)

Runways
Direction	Length		Surface
Direction	ft	m	Surface
7/25	5,004	1,372	Asphalt

Statistics (2006)
- Aircraft operations: 38,900
- Based aircraft: 70
- Sources: FAA and airport website

Greene County–Lewis A. Jackson Regional Airport (FAA LID: GDK) is a public use airport located in Xenia, a city in Greene County, Ohio, United States. It is 10 nautical miles (19 km) east of the central business district of the city of Dayton.

The airport is owned by the Greene County Regional Airport Authority.

== History ==
Efforts to build an airport in Greene County began as early as late November 1966, when an airport authority was created. The county purchased 38 acres (15 ha) for the facility in mid March 1967 and a state grant was approved in late April. A lawsuit was filed in early May by a local resident to prevent the construction of the airport. However, the case was dismissed 18 days later. On June 28th, contracts for general contracting and electrical work were awarded. This was followed two days later by the letting of a contract for runway construction. The day after that, the state authorized the plans. While airplanes were using the airport by mid April 1968, it was still not officially open as lights had not been installed. The airport and its 4,000 ft (1,200 m) runway were dedicated on 6 October 1968. By early June 1969 a 12,000 sq ft (1,100 m^{2}) hangar and 2,400 sq ft (220 m^{2}) terminal had been built. The fixed base operator at the airport ended its contract in 1971 due to financial difficulties.

The airport was renamed Lewis A. Jackson – Greene County Regional Airport in 1994. It updated its master plan in 1997. Commander-Aero, a service center for Aero Commander aircraft, was located at the airport until later that year.

It underwent a significant expansion in 2005, adding runway and taxi length as well as service buildings and roads. The airport underwent significant improvements again in 2016, including runway resurfacing, a new run-up apron for runway 25, new 75,000 sq/ft ramp, and new corporate box hangars. A proposal to add a water line to connect to the airport was approved in September 2017. In 2018, the runway length was increased from 4,500 to 5,004 feet. In 2020, the Greene County Career Center opened their new A&P training facility/hangar on the airport. The airport received funding to renovate its terminal building in 2022. 60 acres of adjacent land were acquired for the airport in September 2024. Four acres of airport land were transferred to the local township in November 2025 to build a fire station.

== Educational uses ==
The Wright-Patterson Air Force Base has historically used the airport to train medical personnel. The airport also hosts the Air Camp, which teaches students about aviation technology through STEM-focused activities.

The main training provider at the airport partnered with Sinclair Community College to provide the college's aviation students with training. Programming started in January 2022 and will run through at least 2024.

== Facilities and aircraft ==
=== Facilities ===
Greene County–Lewis A. Jackson Regional Airport covers an area of 277 acres (112 ha) at an elevation of 949 feet (289 m) above mean sea level. It has one runway designated 7/25 with a 5,004 by 75 ft (1,525 x 23 m) asphalt pavement.

The airport has a fixed-base operator that sells fuel, both avgas and jet fuel, and offers services such as general maintenance, courtesy transportation, and more.

In 2022, the airport received a $400,000 grant to upgrade its terminal, including expanding the lobby, updating the pilots lounge, and renovating the HVAC system. The airport had several upgrades active throughout 2023, including expanding airport parking.

=== Aircraft ===
For the 12-month period ending September 9, 2021, the airport had 50,800 aircraft operations, an average of 139 per day, all of which were general aviation. At that time there were 85 aircraft based at this airport: 92% single-engine and 8% multi-engine airplanes.

== Accidents and incidents ==
The airport suffered seven crashes from 1998 to 2016.

- On October 19, 2014, a Cessna 172 Skyhawk operated by a local flying club crashed while flying touch-and-gos and the airport.
- On January 26, 2016, a small plane crashed in a wooded area while on approach to the airport.

== See also ==
- List of airports in Ohio
