= Koons Airport =

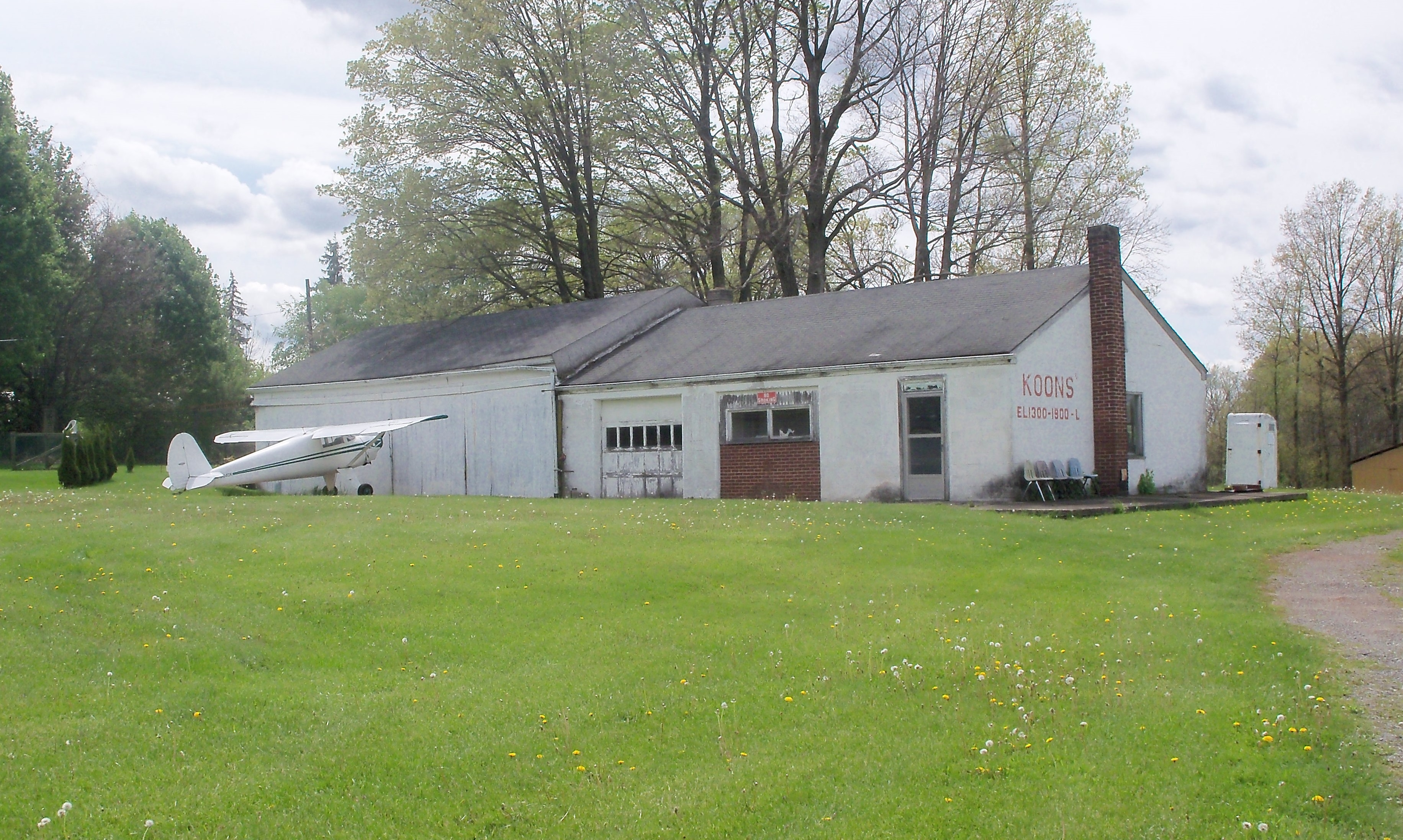
- IATA: none; ICAO: none; FAA LID: 8G8

Summary
- Airport type: Public use
- Owner: Koons Family
- Serves: Salem, Ohio
- Elevation AMSL: 1,327 ft (404 m)
- Coordinates: 40°52′58″N 080°52′50″W

Map
- Location of airport in Ohio 8G8 (the United States)

Runways
Direction	Length		Surface
Direction	ft	m	Surface
9/27	1,850	564	Turf

Statistics (2011)
- Aircraft operations: 2,546
- Based aircraft: 8
- Source: Federal Aviation Administration

Koons Airport (FAA LID: 8G8) is a privately owned, public use airport located two nautical miles (4 km) southwest of the central business district of Salem, in Columbiana County, Ohio, United States

== Facilities and aircraft ==
Koons Airport covers an area of 23 acres (9 ha) at an elevation of 1,327 feet (404 m) above mean sea level. It has one runway designated 9/27 with a turf surface measuring 1,850 by 100 feet (564 x 30 m).

The airport does not have a fixed-base operator and no fuel is available.

For the 12-month period ending August 12, 2011, the airport had 2,546 aircraft operations, an average of 212 per month: 99.8% general aviation and 0.2% military. At that time there were eight aircraft based at this airport: 87.5% single-engine and 12.5% ultralight.

== See also ==
- List of airports in Ohio
