= Piqua Airport =

Public use airport in Piqua, Ohio

- IATA: none; ICAO: none; FAA LID: I17

Summary
- Airport type: Public
- Owner: City of Piqua
- Serves: Piqua, Ohio
- Time zone: UTC−05:00 (-5)
  - Summer (DST): UTC−04:00 (-4)
- Elevation AMSL: 993 ft / 303 m
- Coordinates: 40°09′52″N 084°18′30″W

Map
- Location of airport in Ohio I17 (the United States)

Runways
Direction	Length		Surface
Direction	ft	m	Surface
8/26	3,998	1,219	Asphalt

Statistics (2021)
- Aircraft Operations: 12,000
- Based aircraft: 28
- Sources: Federal Aviation Administration, AirNav, SkyVector

Piqua Airport, also known as Hartzell Field, (FAA LID: I17) is a public use airport located 3 nautical miles northwest of Piqua, Ohio.

== History ==
Plans for an airport in Piqua were announced in early October 1944 after two residents, Dr. M. S. Seiler and Parvin S. Brown, purchased the 120-acre (49 ha) Denman farm west of the city. In June 1950, it was announced Paul E. Clark would become airport manager at the start of the following month.

Dr. Seiler offered to donate additional land to allow the construction of a third runway by late June 1955. In early 1957, Hartzell Industries gave the city $15,000 to allow it buy the land to the west of the runway, while the company acquired another portion with the runway itself. Construction on a 2,850-foot (870 m) paved runway began in early May 1958 and was dedicated five months later on October 12th. Hartzell took over operation of the airport in June 1960 and began making improvements to the facilities. These included repainting hangars, renovating a waiting room, adding runway lighting, installing a VOR beacon and buying additional land adjacent to the runway. A tornado struck the airport in mid June 1964, lifting a 3,750-square-foot (348 m^{2}) hangar off its foundation and destroying the beacon tower.

In 1965, Miami County was one of many in Ohio to request a grant from the state to build a county airport. Officials from Piqua recommended that it be used to expand the city's airport. However, the plan faced competition from other interested parties. One proposal, promoted by a group of Troy businessmen, suggested building a new airport from scratch on an experimental farm northwest of that city. They argued that the site was closer to the center of the county. Ultimately, in December 1966, the county commissioners voted to recommend that Piqua receive the funds. The decision was motivated in part due to the city offering to contribute some of its own money to the project. In February 1967, a board was appointed to create zoning regulations for the airport. A state grant for the airport was approved in early September 1967. An extension of the runway to 4,000 feet (1,200 m) was dedicated on 22 October 1967. However, only two days later, a storm collapsed a portion of one hangar, damaged the roof of a second and blew down fourteen doors on a third.

The airport received a state grant to build a taxiway and ramp in March 1970. Paving of the taxiway was completed in November 1971.

Hartzell established a service center at the airport in 1979.

As a result of the passage of amendments to the Resource Conservation and Recovery Act, the airport operator elected to remove two underground fuel tanks by late April 1986.

By mid February 1992, the propeller overhaul shop was 40,000-square-foot (3,700 m^{2}) in size.

Air Combat Enterprises, or ACES, a company that held mock dogfights with laser equipped aircraft, was established at the airport in summer 1994. The city began soliciting bids to widen the taxiway in March 1995. Construction on a 12,000-square-foot (1,100 m^{2}) expansion to the service center was due to begin the following month.

A proposal to add the subtitle Hartzell Field to the airport's name was made in May 2002.

The city agreed to purchase 2 acres (0.81 ha) of land for a medical helicopter landing pad in March 2020.

== Facilities and aircraft ==
=== Facilities ===
Piqua Airport has one runway, designated 8/26 with an asphalt surface measuring 3,998 by 75 feet (1,219 x 23 m).

The airport has a fixed-base operator that offers limited services. Parking includes hangars and tie-downs for visiting aircraft. Fuel service offers 100LL and Jet-A.

=== Aircraft ===
Based on the 12-month period ending 30 September 2021, the airport had 12,000 aircraft operations, an average of 33 per day. This includes 98% general aviation, and 2% air taxi.

For the same time period, 28 aircraft are based on the field: 27 single-engine airplanes and 1 ultralight.

== Accidents and incidents ==
- On 14 July 1946, a woman was struck by the propeller of a runaway airplane and died four days later.
- On 31 July 1977, a Piper Cherokee crashed after taking off from the airport, injuring the pilot and a passenger.
- On 7 May 1991, a twin-engine airplane made an emergency landing in a nearby field after suffering a dual engine failure while attempting to land at the airport.
- On 2 November 1994, a single-engine airplane struck power lines while landing at the airport. It was the second time such a collision had occurred that year.
- On 18 July 1992, a Cessna 172 crashed while attempting to land at the airport.
- On 24 August 2001, a Beechcraft Super King Air 200 crashed while attempting to land at the airport, killing the pilot.

== See also ==
- List of airports in Ohio
