= Miller Airport (Ohio) =

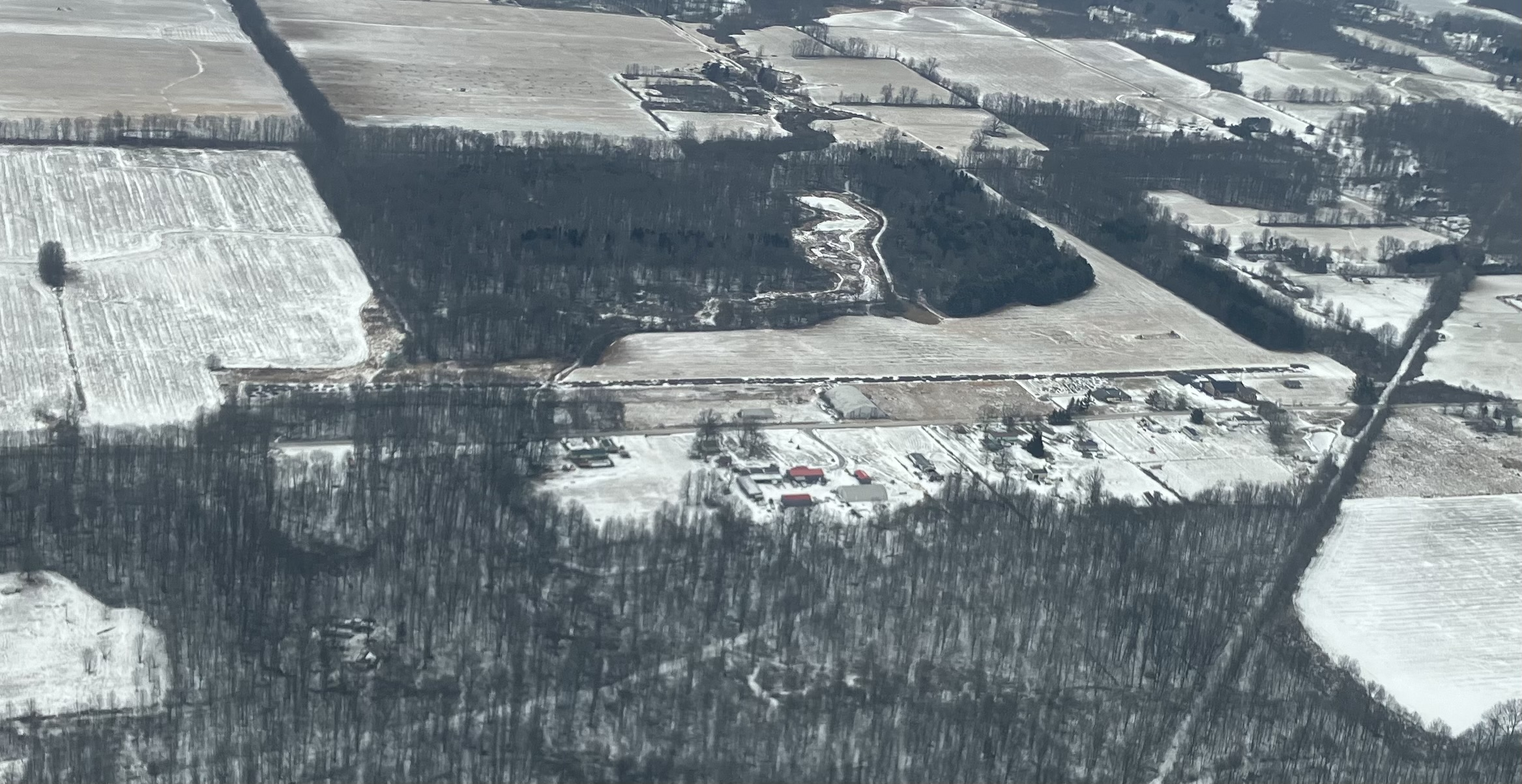
- IATA: none; ICAO: none; FAA LID: 4G3

Summary
- Airport type: Public, Closed indefinitely
- Owner: Bill & Nancy Barrett
- Serves: Alliance, Ohio
- Elevation AMSL: 1,071 ft (326 m)
- Coordinates: 40°58′54″N 081°02′32″W

Map
- Location of airport in Ohio 4G3 (the United States)

Runways
Direction	Length		Surface
Direction	ft	m	Surface
9/27	2,912	888	Asphalt

Statistics (2011)
- Aircraft operations: 3484
- Source: Federal Aviation Administration

Miller Airport (FAA LID: 4G3) is a privately owned, public-use airport six miles northeast of Alliance, in Mahoning County, Ohio. It is closed indefinitely.

== Facilities ==
Miller Airport covers 225 acres (91 ha); its one asphalt runway, 9/27, is 2,912 x 50 ft (888 x 15 m).

There is no fixed-base operator, but 100LL avgas is available. Tie-down and hangars are accessible, and glider service, flight instruction, aircraft rental, and glider towing services are all offered.

In the year ending June 24, 2011 the airport had 3,484 aircraft operations, average 67 per week: 71% local general aviation and 29% transient general aviation.

== Incidents and accidents ==
- On 1 September 2007, a Schweizer SGS 2-33A glider was damaged beyond repair due to its pilot's inattentiveness during preflight. This caused the altimeter to be incorrectly reset, causing the pilot to release tow 1,000 feet lower than he planned. The glider struck the tops of trees on final approach.

== See also ==
- List of airports in Ohio
