= Ross County Airport =

Public use airport in Chillicothe, Ohio

- IATA: none; ICAO: KRZT; FAA LID: RZT

Summary
- Owner: Ross County Board of Commissioners
- Operator: TRM Aviation
- Serves: Chillicothe, Ohio
- Location: Ross County, Ohio
- Opened: 1960s
- Time zone: UTC−05:00 (-5)
  - Summer (DST): UTC−04:00 (-4)
- Elevation AMSL: 725 ft (221 m)
- Coordinates: 39°26′25″N 83°1′24″W

Map
- Location of airport in Ohio RZT (the United States)

Runways
| Direction | Length | | Surface |
| Direction | ft | m | Surface |
|---|---|---|---|
| 5/23 | 5,405 | 1,647 | Asphalt |

Statistics (2021)
- Aircraft movements: 53,655
- Source: Federal Aviation Administration

The Ross County Airport (ICAO: KRZT, FAA LID: RZT) (Note: The airport formerly used the FAA location identifier 3I8.) is a publicly owned, public use airport located 6 miles northwest of Chillicothe in Ross County, Ohio, United States. The airport sits on 350 acres at an elevation of 725 feet.

The airport has a number of attractions for local aviation enthusiasts. A local chapter of the Experimental Aircraft Association is based at the airport and holds events for locals. One event involves a local Ford Tri-Motor aircraft, which is made available for rides.

== History ==
The airport was built in the 1960s when Ohio Governor Jim Rhodes declared each county in Ohio should have an airport. Planning for the airport began as early as May 1964, when the county planning commission proposed the creation of an airport authority. By mid January 1966, a joint airport with Pickaway County had been proposed. Plans for the airport were accepted by the state in early June 1967. The county purchased about 92 acres (37 ha) of land – a portion of which included an existing 2,800-foot (850 m) grass runway – in mid May 1968. Ten days later, a state grant was approved. The airport and its 4,000-foot (1,200 m) runway were certified on 21 November 1968, aircraft began using them by at least April 1969 and they were dedicated on 17 May 1970. An additional state grant was approved before the end of the month.

The airport received a state grant in April 2011 to extend is main taxiway. The taxiway surface was also to be repaved, its design changed to meet FAA standards, and trees and buildings removed.

The airport received over $100,000 to rehabilitate a taxiway to maintain the structural integrity of the pavement as well as to acquire additional land to enhance protection for the airport's approaches.

== Facilities and aircraft ==
The airport has one runway, designated as runway 5/23. It measures 5,405 x 100 ft (1,647 x 30 m) and is paved with asphalt.

For the 12-month period ending September 7, 2021, the airport had 53,655 aircraft operations, an average of 147 per day. This included 92% general aviation, 7% military, and 1% air taxi. For the same time period, 25 aircraft were based at the airport: 24 single-engine airplanes and 1 jet airplane.

The airport has a fixed-base operator that sells fuel – both avgas and jet fuel – and offers services such as catering, deicing, aircraft detailing, rest rooms, showers, a pilot lounge, and snooze rooms.

== Accidents and incidents ==
- On September 28, 1996, a Mitsubishi MU-2B was substantially damaged during a precautionary landing at the Ross County Airport. During climbout from the airport, one of the aircraft's engines lost power. The pilot shut down the engine but was unable to maintain altitude afterward and had difficulty maintaining directional control. After touchdown at the airport during the precautionary landing, the aircraft veered off the runway and came to rest in a ditch. An examination of the left engine revealed that the torque sensor housing had failed due to fatigue, resulting in a loss of drive to the fuel pump. The investigation also found that the pilot did not comply with engine failure procedures and required air speeds. Factors relating to the accident were fatigue failure of the left torque sensor and gear assembly, which resulted in the loss of engine power; a failure of the manufacturer to comply a respective service bulletin; and the pilot's improper use of the flaps and reverse (single-engine) thrust.
- On January 19, 2001, a Piper PA-46 was substantially damaged during an aborted take-off from Ross County Airport. The pilot aboard said that it took an atypically long time to reach rotation speed. When he attempted to rotate the aircraft, it did not lift normally, and his copilot reported the plane did not feel right. As he was only three to four feet off the ground with little runway remaining, the pilot turned to avoid trees and retarded the throttle. The aircraft touched down, slid, turned, and came to rest upright facing the runway. The probable cause of the accident was found to be the pilot's improper pre-flight planning and failure to follow the published checklist procedures, which resulted in ice and snow not being removed from the wings prior to take-off.

== See also ==
- List of airports in Ohio
