= Columbia Airport (Ohio) =

- IATA: none; ICAO: none; FAA LID: 4G8

Summary
- Airport type: Public use
- Owner: Columbia Enterprises Inc
- Serves: Columbia Station, Ohio
- Elevation AMSL: 813 ft (248 m)
- Coordinates: 41°19′08″N 081°57′37″W

Map
- Location of airport in Ohio

Runways
Direction	Length		Surface
Direction	ft	m	Surface
18R/36L	3,152	961	Asphalt
18L/36R	2,947	898	Turf
2/20	2,580	786	Turf

Statistics (2010)
- Aircraft operations: 5,150
- Based aircraft: 44
- Source: Federal Aviation Administration

Columbia Airport (FAA LID: 4G8) is a privately owned, public use airport in Lorain County, Ohio, United States. It is located one nautical mile (2 km) northwest of the central business district of Columbia Station, Ohio.

== Facilities and aircraft ==
Columbia Airport covers an area of 87 acres (35 ha) at an elevation of 813 feet (248 m) above mean sea level. It has one asphalt paved runway, designated as runway 18R/36L, which measures 3,152 by 40 feet (961 x 12 m). There are also two turf runways: 18L/36R is 2,947 by 65 feet (898 x 20 m) and 2/20 is 2,580 by 85 feet (786 x 26 m).

The airport has a fixed-base operator with limited amenities.

For the 12-month period ending June 17, 2010, the airport had 5,150 general aviation aircraft operations, an average of 14 per day. At that time there were 44 aircraft based at this airport: 95.5% single-engine and 4.5% multi-engine.

== Accidents and incidents ==
- On December 7, 2013, a Cessna 152 struck a soft spot while landing on Runway 36R. The aircraft subsequently nosed over, causing substantial damage to the wings and tail. The probable cause of the accident was found to be the pilot's inadequate flight planning and decision to land on the soft grass/turf runway which resulted in a nose over.

== See also ==
- List of airports in Ohio
