= Far View Airport =

Airport in Hiram, Ohio, U.S.

- IATA: none; ICAO: none; FAA LID: OI41

Summary
- Airport type: Private
- Owner: Clarence Moore
- Location: Hiram, Ohio
- Time zone: UTC−05:00 (-5)
  - Summer (DST): UTC−04:00 (-4)
- Elevation AMSL: 1,300 ft (400 m)
- Coordinates: 41°17′45″N 081°09′29″W

Map
- Location of airport in Ohio OI41 (the United States)

Runways
Direction	Length		Surface
Direction	ft	m	Surface
9/27	2,170	661	Turf

Statistics (2006)
- Aircraft operations: 3,334
- Source: Federal Aviation Administration

Far View Airport (FAA LID: 86D) is a privately owned, private use airport located one nautical mile (2 km) south of the central business district of Hiram, a village in Portage County, Ohio, United States.

== Facilities and aircraft ==
Far View Airport covers an area of 4 acres (1.6 ha) at an elevation of 1,300 feet (396 m) above mean sea level. It has one runway designated as runway 9/27 with a 2,170 by 80 ft (661 x 24 m) turf surface.

The airport does not have a fixed-base operator, and no fuel is available.

For the 12-month period ending December 11, 2006, the airport had 3,334 aircraft operations, an average of 277 per month, all of which were general aviation. For the same time period, there were 4 aircraft based at the airport, all ultralights.

== See also ==
- List of airports in Ohio
