= Elyria Airport =

Public use airport in Elyria, Ohio

- IATA: none; ICAO: none; FAA LID: 1G1

Summary
- Airport type: Public
- Owner: Elyria Airport Limited
- Location: Elyria, Ohio
- Time zone: UTC−05:00 (-5)
  - Summer (DST): UTC−04:00 (-4)
- Elevation AMSL: 758 ft (231 m)
- Coordinates: 41°19′53″N 082°06′00″W

Map
- Location of airport in Ohio 1G1 (the United States)

Runways
Direction	Length		Surface
Direction	ft	m	Surface
09/27	3,053	931	Asphalt

Statistics (2021)
- Aircraft Operations: 14,300
- Based aircraft: 67
- Sources: Federal Aviation Administration, AirNav, SkyVector

Elyria Airport (FAA LID: 1G1) is a public use airport located 2 nautical miles south of Elyria, Ohio.

== History ==
The airport was built in 1963 by Howard M. Saddler, a lawyer and real estate developer.

The 35-acre (14 ha) airport was listed for sale in May 1974. It was purchased by Angelo and George Gousios in 1980.

EAA Chapter 255 was located at the airport in June 1995.

Following a crash nearby, in December 1996 local residents created a petition to close or change the flight pattern of the airport.

== Facilities and aircraft ==
=== Facilities ===
Elyria Airport has one runway, designated 09/27 with an asphalt surface measuring 3,053 by 48 feet (931 x 15 m).

The airport does not have a fixed-base operator. Fuel service offers 100LL.

=== Aircraft ===
Based on the 12-month period ending 14 July 2021, the airport had 14,300 aircraft operations, an average of 39 per day. This includes 94% general aviation, and 6% air taxi.

For the same time period, 67 aircraft are based on the field: 66 single-engine airplanes and 1 multi-engine airplane.

== Accidents and incidents ==
- On 7 December 1996, a twin-engine Piper airplane crashed near the airport.
- On 30 June 2019, a Piper Cub crashed near the airport, killing the pilot.

== See also ==
- List of airports in Ohio
