= Chapman Memorial Field =

Airport in Ohio, United States

- IATA: none; ICAO: none; FAA LID: 6CM

Summary
- Airport type: Public
- Owner: William See
- Serves: Centerburg, Ohio
- Elevation AMSL: 1,180 ft (360 m)
- Coordinates: 40°17′44″N 082°43′48″W

Map
- Location of airport in Ohio 6CM (the United States)

Runways
Direction	Length		Surface
Direction	ft	m	Surface
9/27	3,200	975	Turf

Statistics (2010)
- Aircraft operations: 4,000
- Based aircraft: 32
- Source: Federal Aviation Administration

Chapman Memorial Field (FAA LID: 6CM) is a privately owned public-use airport located two nautical miles (4 km) southwest of the central business district of Centerburg, in Knox County, Ohio, United States.

== Facilities and aircraft ==
Chapman Memorial Field covers an area of 40 acres (16 ha) at an elevation of 1,180 feet (360 m) above mean sea level. It has one runway designated 9/27 with a turf surface measuring 3,200 by 80 feet (975 x 24 m).

There is no fixed-base operator at the airport.

For the 12-month period ending April 8, 2010, the airport had 4,000 general aviation aircraft operations, an average of 10 per day. At that time there were 32 aircraft based at this airport: 75% single-engine and 6% multi-engine airplanes as well as 19% ultralight.

== Accidents and incidents ==
- On July 14, 2009, an experimental Antares MA-33 sustained substantial damage when it impacted terrain after departure from the Chapman Field. A witness reported that the weight-shift controlled aircraft departed from the grass airstrip when the plane seemed to go up and then the left wing dipped, and then the airplane spiraled to the ground. The probable cause of the accident was found to be the pilot's failure to maintain adequate airspeed resulting in an aerodynamic stall.
- On June 29, 2012, a Zenith STOL CH 701 crashed during an attempted go-around at the Chapman Memorial Airport. While flying to warm the engine prior to an oil change, the pilot added power to attempt the go-around. The airplane yawed left. Though the pilot attempted to correct with right rudder, the pedal was ineffectual. Upon realizing the aircraft was headed for trees, the pilot added additional power to outclimb them; however, the airplane struck the trees' upper branches, at which point the pilot reduced power and performed a forced landing in a nearby shallow pond. There were found to be no preimpact anomalies that would preclude normal operations. The probable cause of the accident was found to be the pilot’s inability to actuate the airplane’s rudder during an attempted go-around for reasons that could not be determined.

== See also ==
- List of airports in Ohio
