= Troy Skypark =

- IATA: none; ICAO: none; FAA LID: 37I

Summary
- Airport type: Public use
- Owner: David R. & Helen D. Zelnick
- Serves: Troy, Ohio
- Elevation AMSL: 930 ft / 283 m
- Coordinates: 39°59′27″N 084°16′14″W

Map
- Location of airport in Ohio 37I (the United States)

Runways
Direction	Length		Surface
Direction	ft	m	Surface
5/23	3,450	1,052	Turf

Statistics (2020)
- Aircraft operations: 1,508
- Based aircraft: 12
- Source: Federal Aviation Administration

Troy Skypark (FAA LID: 37I) is a privately owned, public use airport located four nautical miles (5 mi, 7 km) southwest of the central business district of Troy, a city in Miami County, Ohio, United States.

== Facilities and aircraft ==
Troy Skypark covers an area of 72 acres (29 ha) at an elevation of 930 feet (283 m) above mean sea level. It has one runway designated 5/23 with a turf surface measuring 3,450 by 100 feet (1,052 x 30 m).

The airport does not have a fixed-base operator, and no fuel is available.

For the 12-month period ending May 21, 2020, the airport had 1,508 aircraft operations, an average of 29 per week. It is entirely general aviation. At that time there were 12 aircraft based at this airport, all single-engine.

== See also ==
- List of airports in Ohio
