= Parr Airport =

Public use airport in Zanesville, Ohio

- IATA: none; ICAO: none; LID: 42I

Summary
- Owner/Operator: C E Norman
- Serves: Zanesville, Ohio
- Built: 1971
- Time zone: UTC−06:00 (-6)
  - Summer (DST): UTC−05:00 (-5)
- Elevation AMSL: 790 ft / 241 m
- Coordinates: 40°00′26″N 82°00′47″W

Map
- Location of airport in Ohio 42I (the United States)

Runways
Direction	Length		Surface
Direction	ft	m	Surface
10/28	3,100	945	Asphalt

The Parr Airport (FAA LID: 42I) is a privately owned, public use airport located 5 miles north of Zanesville in Muskingum County, Ohio.

== History ==
The airport was dedicated in 1971. Built by a father and son, the airport is still owned and managed by the descendants of the original owners. The original runway was grass and had a phone available.

A 50th anniversary celebration was held in 2021.

The airport was damaged in a storm in 2024.

== Facilities and aircraft ==
The Parr Airport is at an elevation of 790 feet (241 m). The airport has one runway, designated as runway 10/28. It is 3100 x 26 feet (945 x 8 m) and is paved with asphalt.

The airport has a fixed-base operator that sells fuel. Limited amenities and flight training are available. An aircraft maintenance shop is also located on site.

As of 2025, no aircraft are based at the airport.

== Accidents and incidents ==
- On August 20, 2013, a Perth Amboy BIRD BK was damaged after landing at the Parr Airport. The pilot intentionally taxied the airplane off the runway after landing to preserve the tires on the antique airplane due to a rough runway surface. The airplane subsequently encountered an unmarked drainage ditch and impacted runway lights. The probable cause of the accident was found to be the pilot's loss of directional control during landing.
- On August 5, 2021, a Piper PA-28 Cherokee was damaged while landing at the Parr Airport. Aircraft nose gear and propeller were damaged during soft field operations.
