= Alexander Salamon Airport =

- IATA: none; ICAO: KAMT; FAA LID: AMT

Summary
- Airport type: Public
- Owner: Adams County Airport Authority
- Serves: West Union, Ohio
- Elevation AMSL: 896 ft (273 m)
- Coordinates: 38°51′05″N 083°33′58″W

Map
- Location of airport in Ohio AMT (the United States)

Runways
Direction	Length		Surface
Direction	ft	m	Surface
05/23	3,558	1,084	Asphalt

Statistics (2021)
- Aircraft operations (year ending 9/7/2021): 1,416
- Based aircraft: 17
- Source: Federal Aviation Administration

Alexander Salamon Airport (ICAO: KAMT, FAA LID: AMT) (Note: The airport formerly used the FAA location identifier I29.) is a public owned public use airport located four nautical miles (8 km) north of the central business district of the city of West Union, in Adams County, Ohio, United States.

Although many U.S. airports use the same three-letter location identifier for the FAA and IATA, this airport is assigned AMT by the FAA but has no designation from the IATA (which assigned AMT to Amata Airport in Amata, South Australia).

== History ==
The airport was named after Dr. Alexander Salamon, a refugee from Czechoslovakia who survived the Dachau concentration camp and immigrated to New York after the war. In 1953, he moved with his wife Lilly and daughter Suzanne to Seaman, Ohio, where another daughter Julie was born. Dr. Salamon served as a physician in Seaman and throughout Adams County until his death in 1971, at age 61. He donated the 44 acres (18 ha) of land from the family farm for the Alexander Salamon Airport because of his gratitude to the county.

Preparatory work for the runway was carried out by the 612th Engineer Battalion of the Ohio National Guard in summer 1970. A $50,000 state grant for the project was received in September. Paving of the 4,000-foot (1,200 m) runway by the L. P. Cavett Company was underway in December 1970. The airport was planned to be dedicated on 25 June 1972.

An addition to the maintenance hangar with office space was under construction in October 1979.

In 2022, the airport received funding from the US Department of Transportation to make upgrades to its facilities. Plans were made to remove a taxiway, reconstruct an existing taxiway, and reconstruct an existing apron.

== Facilities and aircraft ==
Alexander Salamon Airport covers an area of 55 acres (22 ha) at an elevation of 896 feet (273 m) above mean sea level. It has one asphalt paved runway: 5/23 is 3,558 by 65 feet (1,084 x 20 m).

The airport has a fixed-base operator that sells fuel and offers limited amenities.

For the 12-month period ending September 7, 2021, the airport had 1,416 aircraft operations, an average of 27 per week: all general aviation. At that time, there were 17 aircraft based at this airport: all single-engine airplanes.

== Accidents and incidents ==
- On June 24, 2009, an amateur-built Schendl model Mustang II airplane crashed after takeoff from the Alexandr Salamon Airport. Witnesses said the aircraft's engine began running rough on climbout, and smoke was reported coming from the aircraft's tail. The plane attempted to turn back to the runway before entering a nose-down, spiraling descent until impact with terrain. The probable cause of the accident was found to be the pilot's failure to maintain adequate airspeed after a loss of engine power for undetermined reasons, which resulted in an aerodynamic stall/spin at a low altitude.
- On March 13, 2014, a Beechcraft Debonair crashed after landing at the Alexander Salamon Airport. The pilot stated that the wheels locked up and the airplane began to skid after he applied brakes on touchdown. The airplane departed the left side of the runway and impacted runway lighting obstructions near the intersection of the runway and a taxiway.
- On November 15, 2021, a Piper PA-22 Tri Pacer crashed while on approach to the Alexander Salamon Airport. While descending from cruise flight, the pilot said the airplane began to roll to the left unless he continuously held 3/4 aileron input. The pilot diverted to AMT. During the landing flare, the aircraft continued its lefthand roll, bounced, and departed the side of the runway.

== Gallery ==
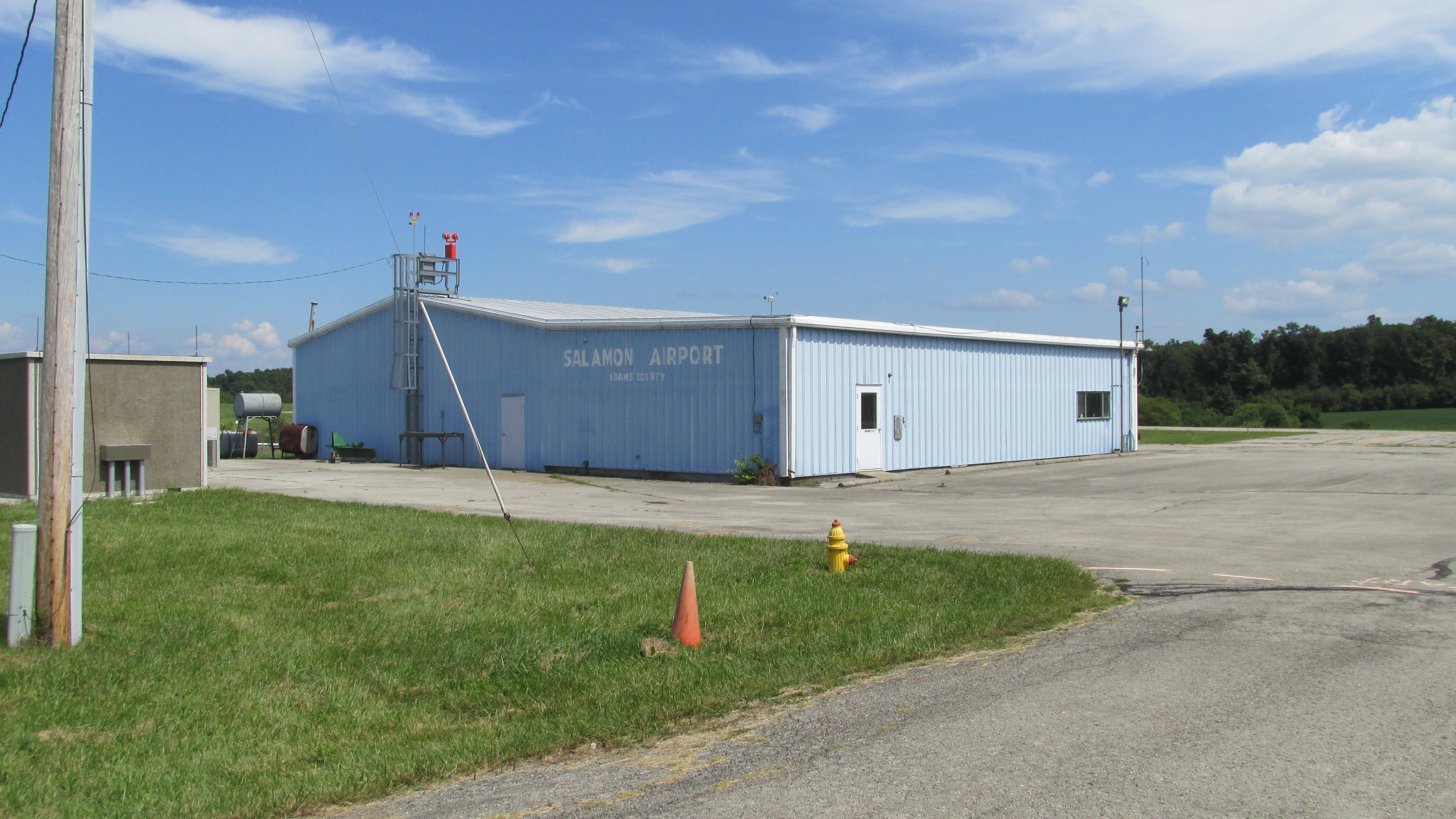
Salamon Airport

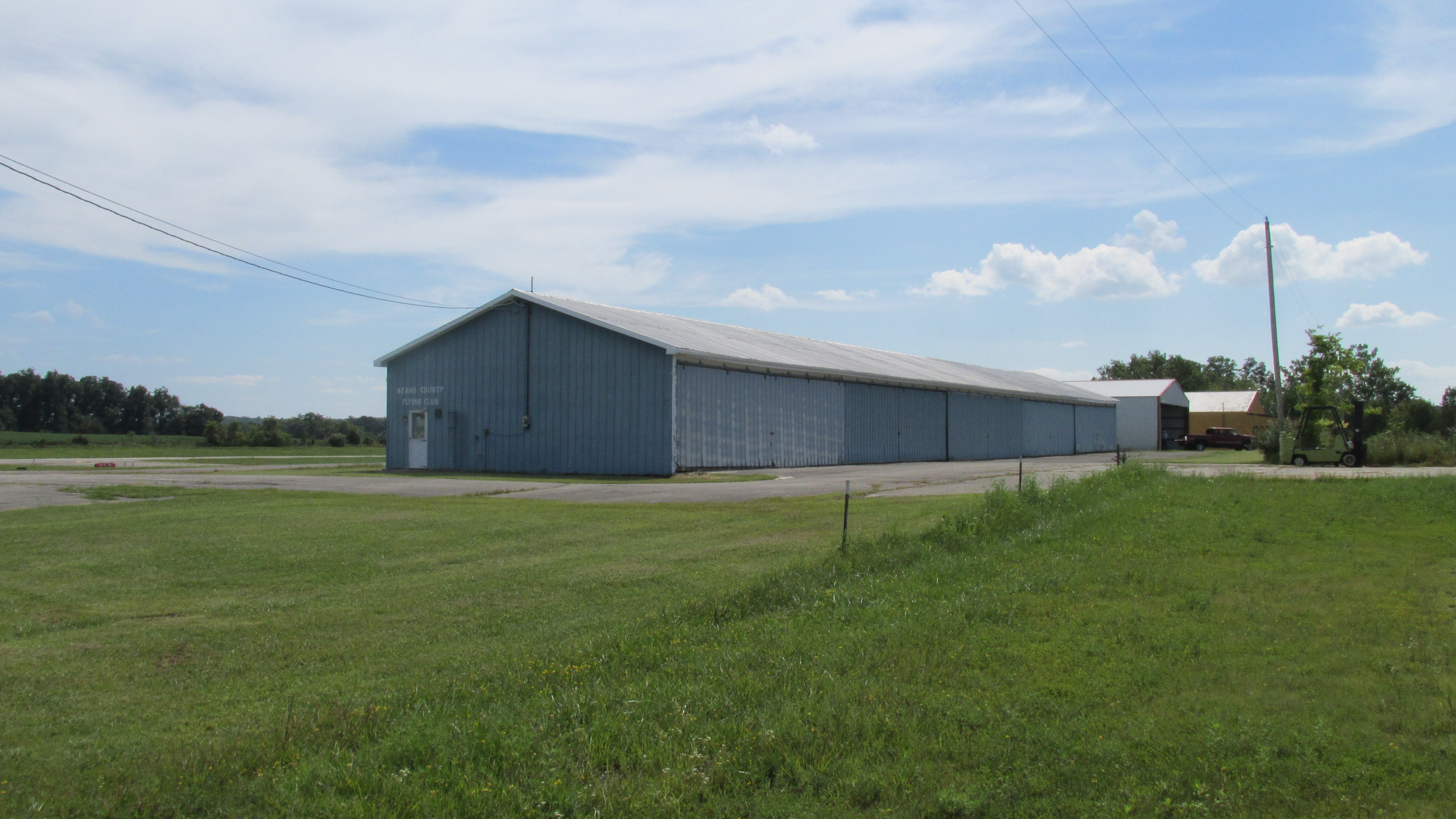
Salamon Airport

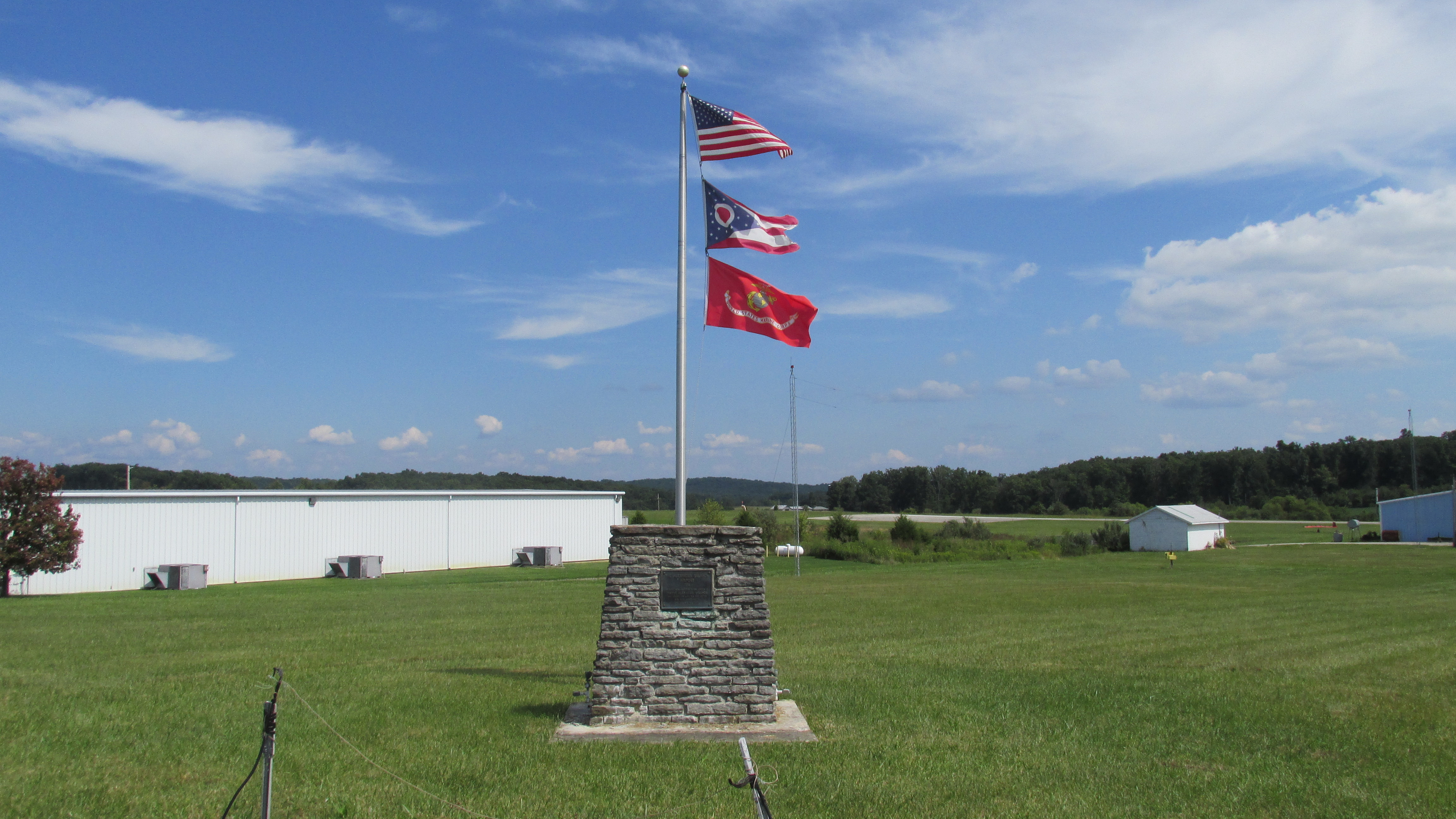
Salamon Airport

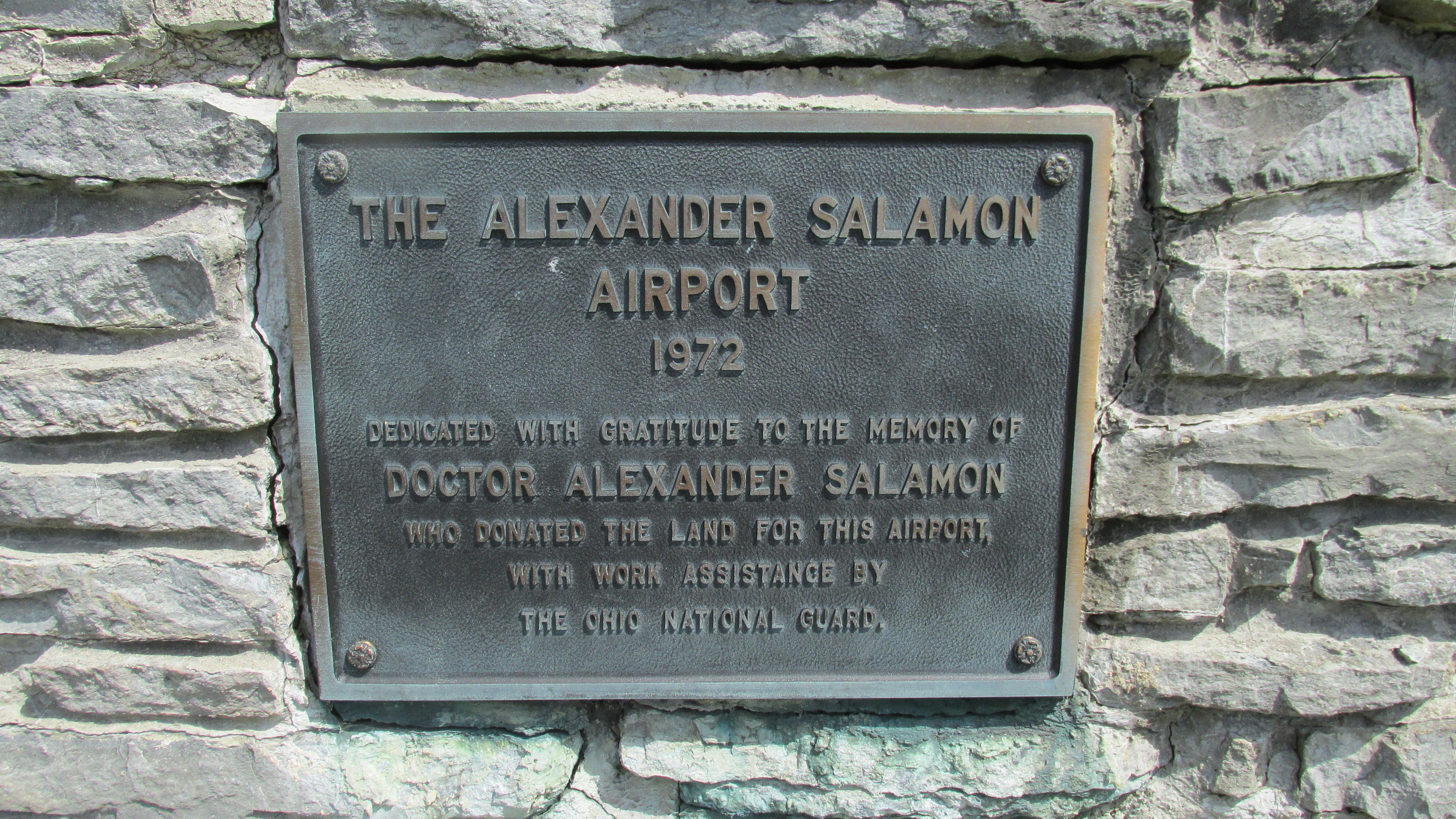
Salamon Airport

== See also ==
- List of airports in Ohio
