= Norwalk-Huron County Airport =

Public use airport in Norwalk, Ohio

- IATA: none; ICAO: none; FAA LID: 5A1

Summary
- Owner: Huron County Commissioners
- Serves: Norwalk, Ohio
- Location: Huron County, Ohio
- Time zone: UTC−05:00 (-5)
  - Summer (DST): UTC−04:00 (-4)
- Elevation AMSL: 853 ft (260 m)
- Coordinates: 41°14′41″N 082°33′04″W
- Website: airport.huroncounty-oh.gov

Map
- Location of airport in Ohio 5A1 (the United States)

Runways
| Direction | Length | | Surface |
| Direction | ft | m | Surface |
|---|---|---|---|
| 10/28 | 4,208 | 1,283 | Asphalt |

Statistics (2021)
- Aircraft movements: 10,220
- Source: Federal Aviation Administration

The Norwalk-Huron County Airport (FAA LID: 5A1) is a publicly owned, public-use airport located 3 miles east of Norwalk, Ohio.

The airport is home to a flying club, and also EAA Chapter 1723. The airport also hosts regular events such as food truck fly-ins, Young Eagles flights, and flight training. A new ground school was started in July 2026, with six students signed up.

== History ==
Planning for an airport began as early as September 1965, when the possibility was discussed before a meeting of local leaders. The airport was officially dedicated on 18 August 1968, although it had been in use by the end of July.

In January 1990, it was announced that Titan Aerospace would be moving to the airport.

Throughout the 2010s, the airport struggled with degrading facilities. The airport received a donation from the CEO of Phillips Manufacturing in July 2011 to provide the matching funds to qualify for a federal grant.

In 2023, the airport received a federal grant to upgrade its runway. The renovation project involved sealing cracks and repainting striping. Later that year, a new 10-year master plan for the Huron County Airport was approved. The plan will cost $6 million over the 10 years and includes funds to rehabilitate airport lighting; add an automatic weather reporting system; rehabilitate the runway, taxiways, and parking aprons; build new hangars; and install wildlife perimeter fencing.

== Facilities and aircraft ==
The airport has one runway, designated as Runway 10/28. The runway measures 4208 x 75 ft (1283 x 23 m) and is paved with asphalt.

The airport has a fixed-base operator that sells fuel and offers limited services and amenities. Airport leadership established a fuel price adjustment program to attract new pilots and aircraft.

For the 12-month period ending July 14, 2021, the airport had 10,220 aircraft operations, an average of 28 per day. It included 99% general aviation and 1% military. For the same time period, 22 aircraft were based at the airport: 20 single-engine and 2 multi-engine airplanes.

== Accidents and incidents ==
- On July 11, 1999, a homebuilt Pitts S-1S was destroyed when it collided with trees while maneuvering at Norwalk-Huron County Airport. A witness saw the airplane taxi out and depart, after which it began performing aerobatic maneuvers such as flying inverted. The witness did not hear any strange engine noises or notice anything "visibly wrong" with the airplane prior to its impact with trees. The probable cause of the accident was found to be the pilot's improper decision to conduct a low level aerobatic maneuver, and his subsequent loss of awareness regarding the location of trees at that level.
