= Tee hangar =

Type of structure designed to hold aircraft

A Tee hangar is a type of enclosed structure designed to hold aircraft in protective storage, and their shape takes advantage of the shape of most general aviation aircraft where the main wings are longer than the horizontal stabilizer. This type of hangar is also known as Tee-hangar, T hangar or T-hangar. Typically constructed of metal, they are primarily used for private aircraft at general aviation airports because they are more economical than rectangular hangars. There are two types of Tee hangars: standard (sometimes called stacked) and nested.

== History ==
T-shaped hangars were proposed as early as 1928. However, it was with the growth of personal aircraft after the end of World War II that they became popular. (Note: Prior to their development, the only other options were larger multi-plane hangars or outdoor tie-downs.) Designs promoted at the time included a four unit square and a version that slid closed over top of an airplane once it was parked. Unlike a single large hangar, t-hangars were found to isolate aircraft in the event of a fire and allow for greater security and smaller doors. They were also simple enough that they could be built out of store-bought materials or shipped as partially prefabricated kits and assembled by aircraft owners themselves.

== Types ==
Tee hangar layout

Standard Tee hangars provide additional storage area. In the diagram, the odd-shaped areas at the end of the hangar clusters may be omitted, may be included as part of the end hangars, or may be used as segregated storage, shop or office space.

Nested Tee hangars require less building material than standard and are wider, but shorter, thereby reducing the length of taxiway required to abut the building. The disadvantage is that if rolling doors are used, the doors will cover the neighboring hangar doors when opened, so some cooperation with neighboring users is required.
