= Youngstown Executive Airport =

- IATA: none; ICAO: none; FAA LID: ~~06G~~

Summary
- Airport type: Public
- Serves: Youngstown
- Location: North Jackson, Ohio
- Opened: Between 1960-62
- Closed: Before 2002
- Coordinates: 41°03′35.1″N 80°49′53.5″W

Map
- Location of airport in Ohio 06G (the United States)

Runways
| Direction | Length | | Surface |
| Direction | ft | m | Surface |
|---|---|---|---|
| 11/29 | 4,170 | 1,271 | Asphalt |
- source

Youngstown Executive Airport (FAA LID ~~06G~~) was a public airport in Mahoning County, Ohio, located 51 nautical miles southeast of Cleveland Hopkins International Airport.

== History ==
Opening at some point between 1960 and 1962, this airport was a multi-use public airport for charters, aircraft maintenance, flight instruction, and even regular drag racing in its later years (causing resentment by the local pilots). In the 1970s, the airport was a Cessna aircraft dealership.

In mid April 1963, the airport was struck by a storm that blew over a hangar and damaged 16 planes.

Through the 1970s, the airport would close to air traffic on Friday and Saturday nights for drag racing on the runway. Local pilots were not pleased with "their" airport being used for drag racing. Some pilots would take off before the racing started, then fly by, attempting to land and interrupting the racing. A Beechcraft 18 charter flight even blew over racing equipment with the "prop wash" from the propeller. The racing agency hired a police officer to patrol the airport during the racing due to the conflict of interest.

Today, the airfield is used by the NightHawks RC Club. The NightHawks rent it from the Allison Brothers, who currently own the airfield. A 1,200-foot portion of the former runway has been repaved for RC aircraft usage.

== Facilities and aircraft ==
The airport had two T-hangars north of the runway, along with an administration building (FBO), repair shop, and another hangar further down. Operating for their successful charter operations they had the following aircraft: a Cessna 421, multiple Cessna 310's, a Piper Navajo, and multiple Beechcraft Model 18's in passenger or cargo configurations.
