= List of wings of the United States Air Force =

This is a list of wings in the United States Air Force, focusing on AFCON wings. Air Force active duty and civilian personnel strength now must be at 1,000 or more for wings.

== AFCON versus MAJCOM Wings ==
This page currently focuses on one of the two historical categories of USAF wings: "AFCON" (Headquarters (US) Air Force CONtrolled) units or "permanent" units, which during the Cold War period were readily distinguished by having one, two or three digit designations, such as the 1st Fighter Wing, 60th Military Airlift Wing, 355th Fighter Wing, and could go through a series of inactivations and activations and still retain their lineage.

There were also MAJCOM (major air command controlled) wings, such as the Strategic Wings of the 1950s and 1960s, which, under the USAF organization and lineage system, are four-digit units, for example, the 4137th Strategic Wing, and whose lineage (histories, awards, and battle honors) ended with their discontinuance and could never be revived. MAJCOM wings are fundamentally "temporary", though many long stayed in existence, and then were revived with a different name but the same number. But under the USAF lineage system they cannot carry on the histories of the previous unit.

When the B-52 dispersal began in the fifties, the new Strategic Air Command units created to support this program were MAJCOM wings and given four-digit designations. Headquarters SAC was aware of the historical significance of records and accomplishments of the strategic wings and the need to perpetuate this lineage as well as the lineage of the units that were no longer active.

In order to retain the lineage of the combat units and to perpetuate the lineage of many currently inactive units with illustrious World War II records, Headquarters SAC received authority from Headquarters USAF to discontinue its strategic wings that were equipped with combat aircraft and to activated AFCON units, most of which were inactive at the time.

The reorganization process, which took place from January to September 1963, was applied to 22 B-52 strategic wings, three air-refueling wings, and the 4321st Strategic Wing at Offutt Air Force Base, Nebraska. "These units were discontinued and two and three-digit AFCON units were activated. In most cases, the bombardment squadron that had been assigned to the strategic wings were inactivated and bombardment squadrons that had previously been assigned to the newly-activated wings were activated. While these actions were almost tantamount to redesignation, they were not official redesignation. Therefore, the records, awards and achievements of the strategic wing could not be inherited by the bomb wings."

During the Gulf War of 1990–91 MAJCOM wings, such as the 7440th Composite Wing (Provisional) at Incirlik AB, Turkey, served alongside Provisional Wings such as the 801st Bomb Wing (Provisional) at Morón Air Base, Spain, and other AFCON wings.

In the 1990s MAJCOM wings were mostly inactivated and replaced with AFCON wings. Perhaps the most well known example was the 4404th Wing in Saudi Arabia which was replaced by a three-digit AFCON wing, the 363rd Air Expeditionary Wing.

== Active USAF Wings ==
The United States Air Force currently operates three categories of permanent wings. Combat Wings operate aircraft or missile systems in combat or combat support roles, or they are non-flying wings which perform or enable combat support functions. Institutional Wings are flying wings or non-flying wings which handle the long-term sustainability, pipeline generation, or developmental requirements of the Air Force. Air Base Wings are non-flying wings, except for one which has a specialized flying mission, that maintain and operate a physical installation; they provide infrastructure support such as security forces, logistics and civil engineering to operate a base.

=== Combat Wings ===
Combat Wings provide a combat or combat support capability to a Combatant Commander, or they perform a specialized function in support of combat operations. Combat wings are of two sub-types: Those that detach elements of the wing for deployment to Air Expeditionary Wings or Groups, or to other operational commands; and others that retain control over all elements of the wing while performing their functions from home base (including any Geographically Separated Units based at overseas locations). The first type is a Combat Generation Wing (CGW) and the second is an In-Place Combat Wing (IPCW). Many Combat Wings also perform the same installation management and protection functions at their home base through subordinate Mission Support Groups that dedicated Air Base Wings perform at the installations that they command.

Wing or independent Group	(wing type)	(CGW or IPCW)	Shield	Base	Air Force	Major Command	Aircraft/Function
1st Fighter Wing	(FW)	(CGW)		Joint Base Langley-Eustis, Virginia	Fifteenth; Air Force	ACC	F-22A, T-38 & F-22 Formal Training Unit (FTU)
1st Special Operations Wing	(SOW)	(CGW)		Hurlburt Field, Florida	(Note: There are no AFSOC Numbered Air Forces)	AFSOC	AC-130J, MC-130J, CV-22B, MQ-9, U-28A; Hurlburt Field installation management
2nd Bomb Wing	(BW)	(CGW)		Barksdale AFB, Louisiana	Eighth; Air Force	AFGSC	B-52; Barksdale AFB installation management
3rd Wing	(WG)	(CGW)		Joint Base Elmendorf-Richardson, Alaska	Eleventh; Air Force	PACAF	F-22A, C-12F, E-3 and Active Associate to 144th AS
4th Fighter Wing	(FW)	(CGW)		Seymour Johnson AFB, North Carolina	Fifteenth; Air Force	ACC	F-15E & F-15E Formal Training Units (FTU)s; Seymour Johnson AFB installation management
5th Bomb Wing	(BW)	(CGW)		Minot AFB, North Dakota	Eighth; Air Force	AFGSC	B-52; Minot AFB installation management
6th Air Refueling Wing	(ARW)	(CGW)		MacDill AFB, Florida	Twenty-First; Air Force	AMC	KC-135; MacDill AFB installation management
7th Bomb Wing	(BW)	(CGW)		Dyess AFB, Texas	Eighth; Air Force	AFGSC	B-1 & B-1 Formal Training Unit (FTU); Dyess AFB installation management
8th Fighter Wing	(FW)	(IPCW)		Kunsan Air Base, Korea	Seventh; Air Force	PACAF	F-16; Kusan AB installation management
9th Reconnaissance Wing	(RW)	(IPCW)		Beale AFB, California	Sixteenth; Air Force	ACC	U-2, TU-2, RQ-180, T-38 and U-2 and RQ-180 Formal Training Units (FTU)s; Beale AFB installation management
15th Wing	(WG)	(CGW)		Joint Base Pearl Harbor–Hickam, Hawaii	Eleventh; Air Force	PACAF	C-17, C-37A and Active Associate to 199th FS
18th Wing	(WG)	(IPCW)		Kadena Air Base, Japan	Fifth; Air Force	PACAF	F-15EX, KC-135, E-3, HH-60W; Kadena AB installation management
19th Airlift Wing	(AW)	(CGW)		Little Rock AFB, Arkansas	Twenty-First; Air Force	AMC	C-130J; Little Rock AFB installation management
20th Fighter Wing	(FW)	(CGW)		Shaw AFB, South Carolina	Fifteenth; Air Force	ACC	F-16CJ; Shaw AFB installation management
22nd Air Refueling Wing	(ARW)	(CGW)		McConnell AFB, Kansas	Eighteenth; Air Force	AMC	KC-135, KC-46; McConnell AFB installation management
23rd Wing	(WG)	(CGW)		Moody AFB, Georgia	Fifteenth; Air Force	ACC	A-10, HH-60W, HC-130J; Moody AFB installation management
25th Attack Wing	(ATKW)	(CGW)		Shaw AFB, South Carolina	Fifteenth; Air Force	ACC	MQ-9
27th Special Operations Wing	(SOW)	(CGW)		Cannon AFB, New Mexico		AFSOC	AC-130J, MC-130J, CV-22B, MQ-9, U-28A; Cannon AFB installation management
28th Bomb Wing	(BW)	(CGW)		Ellsworth AFB, South Dakota	Eighth; Air Force	AFGSC	B-1; Ellsworth AFB installation management
31st Fighter Wing	(FW)	(CGW)		Aviano Air Base, Italy	Third; Air Force	USAFE	F-16, HH-60W, Control and Reporting Center; Aviano AB installation management
35th Fighter Wing	(FW)	(CGW)		Misawa Air Base, Japan	Fifth; Air Force	PACAF	F-16; Misawa AB installation management
36th Wing	(WG)	(IPCW)		Andersen AFB, Guam	Eleventh; Air Force	PACAF	Fighter, Bomber, Reconnaissance, Refueling aircraft on rotational deployment Anderson AFB installation management
48th Fighter Wing	(FW)	(CGW)		RAF Lakenheath, England	Third; Air Force	USAFE	F-15E, F-35A; RAF Lakenheath installation management
51st Fighter Wing	(FW)	(IPCW)		Osan Air Base, Korea	Seventh; Air Force	PACAF	F-16; Osan AB installation management
52nd Fighter Wing	(FW)	(CGW)		Spangdahlem Air Base, Germany	Third; Air Force	USAFE	F-16; Spangdahlem AB installation management
53rd Wing	(WG)	(IPCW)		Eglin AFB, Florida	USAF; Warfare; Center	ACC	F-15C, F-15E, F-15EX, F/QF-16, A-10, F-22A, MQ-9A, F-35A Operational Test & Evaluation (OT&E) of USAF weapons systems
55th Wing	(WG)	(IPCW)		Offutt AFB, Nebraska	Sixteenth; Air Force	ACC	RC-135, EA-37B (Note: 55th Electronic Combat Group, Geographically separated Unit at Davis-Monthan AFB); Offutt AFB installation management
57th Wing	(WG)	(IPCW)		Nellis AFB, Nevada	USAF; Warfare; Center	ACC	MQ-9A, F-15E, F-16, F-22A, F-35A, HH-60W Weapons Schools, Aggressors and Thunderbirds
60th Air Mobility Wing	(AMW)	(CGW)		Travis AFB, California	Eighteenth; Air Force	AMC	C-5, C-17, KC-46; Travis AFB installation management
62nd Airlift Wing	(AW)	(CGW)		Joint Base Lewis-McChord, Washington	Eighteenth; Air Force	AMC	C-17
67th Cyberspace Wing	(CW)	(IPCW)		Joint Base San Antonio (Lackland AFB, Kelly Field), Texas	Sixteenth; Air Force	ACC	Global cyberspace operations in direct support of United States Cyber Command
70th Intelligence, Surveillance and Reconnaissance Wing	(ISRW)	(IPCW)		Fort George G. Meade, Maryland	Sixteenth; Air Force	ACC	Embedded in the National Security Agency, conducts global cryptologic warfare and signals intelligence
86th Airlift Wing	(AW)	(IPCW)		Ramstein Air Base, Germany	Third; Air Force	USAFE	C-21A, C-37A, C-130J; Ramstein AB installation management
89th Airlift Wing	(AW)	(IPCW)		Joint Base Andrews, Maryland	Eighteenth; Air Force	AMC	C-32A, C-37A,B, C-40B, VC-25
90th Missile Wing	(MW)	(IPCW)		Francis E. Warren AFB, Wyoming	Twentieth; Air Force	AFGSC	Minuteman III; F.E. Warren AFB installation management
91st Missile Wing	(MW)	(IPCW)		Minot AFB, North Dakota	Twentieth; Air Force	AFGSC	Minuteman III
92nd Air Refueling Wing	(ARW)	(CGW)		Fairchild AFB, Washington	Eighteenth; Air Force	AMC	KC-135; Fairchild AFB installation management
93rd Air Ground Operations Wing	(AGOW)	(CGW)		Moody AFB Georgia	Fifteenth; Air Force	ACC	3rd Air Support Operations Group (Note: Embedded with the U.S. Army's III Corps (Fort Hood, TX)); 18th Air Support Operations Group (Note: Embedded with the U.S. Army's XVIII Airborne Corps (Pope Field, NC)); 820th Base Defense Group
94th Airlift Wing	(AW)	(CGW)		Dobbins Air Reserve Base, Georgia	Twenty-Second; Air Force	AFRC	C-130; Dobbins ARB installation management
95th Wing	(WG)	(IPCW)		Offutt Air Force Base, Nebraska	Eighth; Air Force	AFGSC	E-4
100th Air Refueling Wing	(ARW)	(IPCW)		RAF Mildenhall, England	Third; Air Force	USAFE	KC-135; RAF Mildenhall installation management
301st Fighter Wing	(FW)	(CGW)		NAS Fort Worth Joint Reserve Base, Texas	Tenth; Air Force	AFRC	F-35A
302nd Airlift Wing	(AW)	(CGW)		Peterson SFB, Colorado	Twenty-Second; Air Force	AFRC	C-130
305th Air Mobility Wing	(AMW)	(CGW)		Joint Base McGuire-Dix-Lakehurst, New Jersey	Twenty-First; Air Force	AMC	C-17, KC-46
307th Bomb Wing	(BW)	(CGW)		Barksdale AFB, Louisiana	Tenth; Air Force	AFRC	B-52 Formal Training Unit (FTU) and Associate to 2nd and 7th Bomb Wings
310th Space Wing	(SW)	(IPCW)		Schriever SFB, Colorado	Tenth; Air Force	AFRC	Associate to multiple U S Space Force Deltas (the Wing is to be deactivated in FY 2027)
315th Airlift Wing	(AW)	(CGW)		Joint Base Charleston, South Carolina	Fourth; Air Force	AFRC	Associate to 437th AW
317th Airlift Wing	(AW)	(CGW)		Dyess Air Force Base, Texas	Eighteenth; Air Force	AMC	C-130J
319th Reconnaissance Wing	(RW)	(IPCW)		Grand Forks AFB, North Dakota	Sixteenth; Air Force	ACC	RQ-4, E-11A (Note: Geographically separated unit at Robbins AFB); Grand Forks AFB installation management
325th Fighter Wing	(FW)	(CGW)		Tyndall AFB, Florida	Fifteenth; Air Force	ACC	F-35A; Tyndall AFB installation management
341st Missile Wing	(MW)	(IPCW)		Malmstrom AFB, Montana	Twentieth; Air Force	AFGSC	Minuteman III; Malmstrom AFB installation management
349th Air Mobility Wing	(AMW)	(CGW)		Travis AFB, California	Fourth; Air Force	AFRC	Associate to 60th AMW
350th Spectrum Warfare Wing	(SWW)	(IPCW)		Eglin AFB, Florida	USAF; Warfare; Center	ACC	Electronic warfare reprogramming, testing, and assessment capabilities to support frontline aircraft
352nd Special Operations Wing	(SOW)	(CGW)		RAF Mildenhall, England		AFSOC	CV-22B, MC-130J
353rd Special Operations Wing	(SOW)	(CGW)		Kadena Air Base, Japan		AFSOC	CV-22B, MC-130J
354th Fighter Wing	(FW)	(CGW)		Eielson AFB, Alaska	Eleventh; Air Force	PACAF	F-16, F-35A; Eielson AFB installation management
355th Wing	(WG)	(CGW)		Davis-Monthan AFB, Arizona	Fifteenth; Air Force	ACC	HH-60W, HC-130J; Davis-Monthan AFB installation management
363rd Intelligence, Surveillance and Reconnaissance Wing	(ISRW)	(IPCW)		Joint Base Langley-Eustis, Virginia	Sixteenth; Air Force	ACC	Provides targeting and special operations intelligence directly to Air Component Commanders
366th Fighter Wing	(FW)	(CGW)		Mountain Home AFB, Idaho	Fifteenth; Air Force	ACC	F-15E & F-15SG FMS (Singapore) Formal Training Unit (FTU); Mountain Home AFB installation management
374th Airlift Wing	(AW)	(IPCW)		Yokota Air Base, Japan	Fifth; Air Force	PACAF	C-12J, C-130J; Yokota AB installation management
375th Air Mobility Wing	(AMW)	(IPCW)		Scott AFB, Illinois	Eighteenth; Air Force	AMC	C-21A and Active Associate to 126th ARW and 932nd AW; Scott AFB installation management
388th Fighter Wing	(FW)	(CGW)		Hill AFB, Utah	Fifteenth; Air Force	ACC	F-35A
403rd Wing	(WG)	(CGW)		Keesler AFB, Mississippi	Twenty-Second; Air Force	AFRC	C-130J, WC-130J
419th Fighter Wing	(FW)	(CGW)		Hill AFB, Utah	Tenth; Air Force	AFRC	Associate to 388th FW
432nd Wing	(WG)	(IPCW)		Creech Air Force Base, Nevada	Fifteenth; Air Force	ACC	MQ-9, RQ-170; Creech AFB installation management
433rd Airlift Wing	(AW)	(CGW)		Joint Base San Antonio (Lackland AFB, Kelly Field), Texas	Fourth; Air Force	AFRC	C-5
434th Air Refueling Wing	(ARW)	(CGW)		Grissom Air Reserve Base, Indiana	Fourth; Air Force	AFRC	KC-135; Grissom ARB installation management
435th Air Ground Operations Wing	(AGOW)	(CGW)		Ramstein Air Base, Germany	Third; Air Force	USAFE	4th Air Support Operations Group (Note: Embedded with U.S. Army Europe and Africa units); 435th Communications Operations Group (Note: combat communications and theater-wide information systems); 435th Contingency Response Group (Note: Functions as USAFE's specialized "open-the-base" force to build expeditionary airfields from scratch)
436th Airlift Wing	(AW)	(CGW)		Dover AFB, Delaware	Twenty-First; Air Force	AMC	C-5, C-17; Dover AFB installation management
437th Airlift Wing	(AW)	(CGW)		Joint Base Charleston, South Carolina	Twenty-First; Air Force	AMC	C-17
439th Airlift Wing	(AW)	(CGW)		Westover Air Reserve Base. Chicopee, MA	Fourth; Air Force	AFRC	C-5; Westover ARB installation management
442nd Fighter Wing	(FW)	(CGW)		Whiteman AFB, Missouri	Tenth; Air Force	AFRC	A-10
445th Airlift Wing	(AW)	(CGW)		Wright-Patterson AFB, Ohio	Fourth; Air Force	AFRC	C-17
446th Airlift Wing	(AW)	(CGW)		Joint Base Lewis-McChord, Washington	Fourth; Air Force	AFRC	Associate to 62nd AW
452nd Air Mobility Wing	(AMW)	(CGW)		March Air Reserve Base, California	Fourth; Air Force	AFRC	C-17, KC-135; March ARB installation management
459th Air Refueling Wing	(ARW)	(CGW)		Joint Base Andrews, Maryland	Fourth; Air Force	AFRC	KC-135
461st Wing	(WG)	(CGW)		Robins AFB, Georgia	Fifteenth; Air Force	ACC	Ground-based Battle Management Control, expeditionary airfield operations, and combat communications
480th Intelligence, Surveillance and Reconnaissance Wing	(ISRW)	(IPCW)		Joint Base Langley-Eustis, Virginia	Sixteenth; Air Force	ACC	Operates and maintains the Air Force Distributed Common Ground System (DCGS)
482nd Fighter Wing	(FW)	(CGW)		Homestead Air Reserve Base, Florida	Tenth; Air Force	AFRC	F-16; Homestead ARB installation management
492nd Special Operations Wing	(SOW)	(CGW)		Hurlburt Field, Florida (Note: Relocating to Davis-Monthan AFB by 2028)		AFSOC	U-28A, C-146A. Also U-28A / C-146A and OA-1K Formal Training Units (FTU) (CV-22B, OA-1K, C-146A (Note: GSUs at Duke Field, FL)) (Note: Once transition from a training wing to a power projection wing is complete)
495th Fighter Group		(CGW)		Shaw Air Force Base, South Carolina	Fifteenth; Air Force	ACC	Active Associate Fighter Squadrons
507th Air Refueling Wing	(ARW)	(CGW)		Tinker AFB, Oklahoma	Fourth; Air Force	AFRC	KC-135
509th Bomb Wing	(BW)	(CGW)		Whiteman AFB, Missouri	Eighth; Air Force	AFGSC	B-2; Whiteman AFB installation management
512th Airlift Wing	(AW)	(CGW)		Dover AFB, Delaware	Fourth; Air Force	AFRC	Associate to 436th AW
514th Air Mobility Wing	(AMW)	(CGW)		Joint Base McGuire-Dix-Lakehurst, New Jersey	Fourth; Air Force	AFRC	Associate to 305th AMW
515th Air Mobility Operations Wing	(AMOW)	(IPCW)		Joint Base Pearl Harbor–Hickam, Hawaii	Eighteenth; Air Force	AMC	Provides command & control, aerial port logistics, and maintenance for transient cargo and tanker aircraft across the Indo-Pacific theater
521st Air Mobility Operations Wing	(AMOW)	(IPCW)		Ramstein AB, Germany	Twenty-First; Air Force	AMC	Provides command & control, aerial port logistics, and maintenance for transient cargo and tanker aircraft across Europe, the Middle East and Africa
552nd Air Control Wing	(ACW)	(CGW)		Tinker AFB, Oklahoma	Fifteenth; Air Force	ACC	E-3, Control and Reporting Center
557th Weather Wing	(WW)	(IPCW)		Offutt AFB, Nebraska	Sixteenth; Air Force	ACC	Weather forecasting and reporting
582nd Helicopter Group		(IPCW)		Francis E. Warren Air Force Base, Wyoming	Twentieth; Air Force	AFGSC	Missile Field Helicopter Squadrons: UH-1N, MH-139A
621st Contingency Response Wing	(CRW)	(CGW)		Joint Base McGuire-Dix-Lakehurst, New Jersey	Twenty-First; Air Force	AMC	Opens airfields and establishes, expands, sustains, and coordinates air mobility operations (Note: The 621st Contingency Response Group (CRG) is based with the Wing headquarters at Joint Base McGuire, Dix, Lakehurst to respond to Europe, Africa and the Middle East. The 821st CRG is a Geographically Separated Unit based at Travis AFB to serve the Indo-Pacific theater)
655th Intelligence, Surveillance and Reconnaissance Wing	(ISRW)	(IPCW)		Wright-Patterson Air Force Base, Ohio	Tenth; Air Force	AFRC	Administrative command for USAFR Intelligence Squadrons associated with the 70th, 363rd and 480th ISRWs
688th Cyberspace Wing	(CW)	(IPCW)		Joint Base San Antonio (Lackland AFB, Kelly Field), Texas	Sixteenth; Air Force	ACC	Cyber security, engineering, and network operations in defense of the Air Force Information Network
910th Airlift Wing	(AW)	(CGW)		Youngstown Air Reserve Station, Ohio	Twenty-Second; Air Force	AFRC	C-130J; Youngstown ARS installation management
911th Airlift Wing	(AW)	(CGW)		Pittsburgh Joint Air Reserve Station, Pennsylvania	Fourth; Air Force	AFRC	C-17; Pittsburgh Joint ARS installation management
914th Air Refueling Wing	(ARW)	(CGW)		Niagara Falls Air Reserve Station, New York	Fourth; Air Force	AFRC	KC-135; Niagara Falls ARS installation management
916th Air Refueling Wing	(ARW)	(CGW)		Seymour Johnson AFB, North Carolina	Fourth; Air Force	AFRC	KC-46
919th Special Operations Wing	(SOW)	(CGW)		Duke Field, Florida	Tenth; Air Force	AFRC	Associate to 1st SOW; Duke Field installation Management
920th Rescue Wing	(RQW)	(CGW)		Patrick SFB, Florida	Tenth; Air Force	AFRC	HH-60W, HC-130J
926th Wing	(WG)	(IPCW)		Nellis Air Force Base, Nevada	Tenth; Air Force	AFRC	Associate to 53rd WG, 57th WG and 432nd WG
927th Air Refueling Wing	(ARW)	(CGW)		MacDill Air Force Base, Florida	Fourth; Air Force	AFRC	Associate to 6th ARW
931st Air Refueling Wing	(ARW)	(CGW)		McConnell Air Force Base, Kansas	Fourth; Air Force	AFRC	Associate to 22nd ARW
932nd Airlift Wing	(AW)	(CGW)		Scott AFB, Illinois	Twenty-Second; Air Force	AFRC	C-40C and Associate to 375th AMW
934th Airlift Wing	(AW)	(CGW)		Minneapolis-St Paul Joint Air Reserve Station, Minnesota	Twenty-Second; Air Force	AFRC	C-130; Minneapolis-St Paul Joint ARS installation management
940th Air Refueling Wing	(ARW)	(CGW)		Beale AFB, California	Fourth; Air Force	AFRC	KC-135

=== Institutional Wings ===
Institutional wings contribute to the manning, training, equipping and sustainment of the U.S Air Force. About a third of Institutional Wings also perform the same installation management and protection functions at their home base through subordinate Mission Support Groups that many Combat Wings and the dedicated Air Base Wings perform at the installations that they command.

Wing or independent Group	(wing type)	Shield	Base	Air Force	Major Command	Aircraft/Function
12th Flying Training Wing	(FTW)		Joint Base San Antonio (Randolph AFB), Texas	Nineteenth; Air Force	AETC	T-6, T-7, T-38 Pilot Instructor Training (PIT), Introduction to Fighter Fundamentals (IFF), (Note: IFF for CSOs and for international student pilots not attending ENJJPT) and Undergraduate Combat Systems Officer (UCSO) training
14th Flying Training Wing	(FTW)		Columbus AFB, Mississippi	Nineteenth; Air Force	AETC	T-6, T-38 Undergraduate Pilot Training (UPT), Fighter/Bomber Fundamentals (F/BF) and Air Mobility Fundamentals (AMF-S); Columbus AFB installation management
17th Training Wing	(TRW)		Goodfellow AFB, Texas	Second; Air Force	AETC	Technical Training; Goodfellow AFB installation management
33rd Fighter Wing	(FW)		Eglin AFB, Florida	Fifteenth; Air Force	ACC (Note: 33rd FW, 56th FW & 49th WG realigned to 15AF ACC from 19AF AETC summer 2026)	F-35A Formal Training Units (FTU)s (Note: some are Geographically Separated Units at Ebbing ANGB, AR)
37th Training Wing	(TRW)		Joint Base San Antonio (Lackland AFB), Texas	Second; Air Force	AETC	Basic Training; Technical Training
47th Flying Training Wing	(FTW)		Laughlin AFB, Texas	Nineteenth; Air Force	AETC	T-6, T-38 Undergraduate Pilot Training (UPT), Fighter/Bomber Fundamentals (F/BF) and Air Mobility Fundamentals (AMF-S); Laughlin AFB installation management
49th Wing	(WG)		Holloman AFB, New Mexico	Fifteenth; Air Force	ACC	F-16, MQ-9 Formal Training Units (FTU)s; Holloman AFB installation management
56th Fighter Wing	(FW)		Luke AFB, Arizona	Fifteenth; Air Force	ACC	F-16, F-35A, Control and Reporting Center Formal Training Units (FTU)s; Luke AFB installation management
58th Special Operations Wing	(SOW)		Kirtland AFB, New Mexico	Nineteenth; Air Force	AETC	AC-130J, HC-130J, MC-130J, CV-22B, UH-1N, HH-60W Formal Training Units (FTU)s. Also TH-1H Undergraduate Helicopter Training (UHT) at Fort Rucker, AL and a UH-1N RQS at Fairchild AFB, WA
59th Medical Wing	(MDW)		Joint Base San Antonio (Lackland AFB), Texas	Medical Readiness Command - A	AFMEDCOM (Note: A Direct Reporting Unit rather than a Major Command)	Medical Groups within Joint Base San Antonio
71st Flying Training Wing	(FTW)		Vance AFB, Oklahoma	Nineteenth; Air Force	AETC	T-6, T-38 Undergraduate Pilot Training (UPT), Fighter/Bomber Fundamentals (F/BF) and Air Mobility Fundamentals (AMF-S); Vance AFB installation management
73rd Medical Wing	(MDW)		Falls Church, Virginia	Medical Readiness Command - B	AFMEDCOM	Medical Groups at bases operated by AFSOC and AFMC wings and at the USAFA and US Space Force bases
77th Intelligence Wing	(IW)		Joint Base Anacostia-Bolling, District of Columbia		AFDW	Administrative command for USAF personnel assigned to the Defense Intelligence Agency
79th Medical Wing	(MDW)		Falls Church, Virginia	Medical Readiness Command - B	AFMEDCOM	Medical Groups within the AFDW and at bases operated by ACC wings (Note: except for Luke AFB and Holloman AFB which are supported by 359th MDW groups as those bases were AETC bases when AFMEDCOM was established)
80th Flying Training Wing	(FTW)		Sheppard AFB, Texas	Nineteenth; Air Force	AETC	T-6, T-38 Euro-NATO Joint Jet Pilot Training (ENJJPT)
81st Training Wing	(TRW)		Keesler AFB, Mississippi	Second; Air Force	AETC	Technical Training; Keesler AFB installation management
82nd Training Wing	(TRW)		Sheppard AFB, Texas	Second; Air Force	AETC	Technical Training; Sheppard AFB installation management
96th Test Wing	(TW)		Eglin AFB, Florida	Air Force; Test Center	AFMC	F-15C, F-15E, F-15EX, F-16, C-32B, C-130J, UH-1N Developmental Test & Evaluation (DT&E) of USAF airborne weapons and platform related systems. Eglin AFB installation management
97th Air Mobility Wing	(AMW)		Altus AFB, Oklahoma	Nineteenth; Air Force	AETC	C-17, KC-135, KC-46 Formal Training Units (FTU)s; Altus AFB installation management
306th Flying Training Group			U.S. Air Force Academy, Colorado		USAFA	TG-15A/B, TG-16A, TG-17A, UV-18B, T-41D, T-51A, T-53A Powered flight, glider and parachute training for USAFA Cadets
314th Airlift Wing	(AW)		Little Rock AFB. Arkansas	Nineteenth; Air Force	AETC	C-130 Formal Training Unit (FTU)
329th Medical Wing	(MDW)		Joint Base San Antonio (Lackland AFB,), Texas	Medical Readiness Command - A	AFMEDCOM	Medical Groups at bases operated by AMC wings and AFRC Medical Groups
340th Flying Training Group			Joint Base San Antonio (Randolph AFB), Texas	Twenty-Second; Air Force	AFRC	Reserve Associate Flying Training Squadrons
359th Medical Wing	(MDW)		Joint Base San Antonio (Lackland AFB), Texas	Medical Readiness Command - A	AFMEDCOM	Medical Groups at bases operated by AFGSC wings and AETC wings outside of JB San Antonio (Note: plus Luke AFB and Holloman AFB which are ACC bases but were AETC bases when AFMEDCOM was established)
412th Test Wing	(TW)		Edwards AFB, California	Air Force; Test Center	AFMC	F-22, F-35, F-16, T-7, B-52, B-1, B-2, C-12, C-17, KC-46, KC-135 U.S. Air Force Test Pilot School and Developmental Test & Evaluation (DT&E) of USAF aircraft. Edwards AFB installation management
448th Supply Chain Management Wing	(SCMW)		Tinker AFB, Oklahoma	Air Force; Sustainment; Center	AFMC	Manages procurement, asset engineering, and financial budgeting for global Air Force hardware inventories
505th Command and Control Wing	(CCW)		Hurlburt Field, Florida	USAF; Warfare; Center	ACC	Command & Control Formal Training Unit (FTU), also tests command and control systems and conducts joint command & control exercises
635th Supply Chain Operations Wing	(SCOW)		Scott AFB, Illinois	Air Force; Sustainment; Center	AFMC	Executes logistics, fuels distribution, and time-critical part tracking supporting active flightlines worldwide
656th Medical Wing	(MDW)		Joint Base Pearl Harbor–Hickam, Hawaii	Medical Readiness Command - A	AFMEDCOM	Medical Groups at bases operated by PACAF wings
711th Human Performance Wing	(HPW)		Wright-Patterson AFB, Ohio	Air Force; Research; Laboratory	AFMC	Medical Research Laboratory
779th Medical Wing	(MDW)		Sembach Kaserne, Germany	Medical Readiness Command - B	AFMEDCOM	Medical Groups at bases operated by USAFE-AFAFRICA wings
908th Flying Training Wing	(FTW)		Maxwell-Gunter AFB, Alabama	Twenty-Second; Air Force	AFRC	MH-139A Formal Training Unit (FTU)
944th Fighter Wing	(FW)		Luke AFB, Arizona	Tenth; Air Force	AFRC	Associate to 56th FW

=== Air Base Wings ===
Air Base Wings are non-deployable "city management" and installation protection organizations. They command an Air Force Base but except for the 11th Wing and 316th Wing do not command any units not directly involved in the operation of the installation. Only about 15% of Air Force Bases are commanded by an Air Base Wing with the remaining 85% under the command of either a combat wing or an institutional wing through that wing's subordinate Mission Support Group. The seven Joint Bases for which the USAF has command responsibility are also commanded by Air Base Wings.

Wing	(wing type)	Shield	Base	Air Force	Major Command	Aircraft/Function
10th Air Base Wing	(ABW)		U.S. Air Force Academy, Colorado		USAFA	U.S. Air Force Academy installation management
11th Wing	(WG)		Joint Base Anacostia-Bolling, DC		AFDW	Joint Base Anacostia-Bolling installation management USAF Band, USAF Honor Guard
39th Air Base Wing	(ABW)		Incirlik AB, Turkey	Third; Air Force	USAFE	Incirlik AB installation management
42nd Air Base Wing	(ABW)		Maxwell-Gunter AFB, Alabama	Air; University	AETC	Maxwell-Gunter AFB installation management
72nd Air Base Wing	(ABW)		Tinker AFB, Oklahoma	Air Force; Sustainment; Center	AFMC	Tinker AFB installation management
75th Air Base Wing	(ABW)		Hill AFB, Utah	Air Force; Sustainment; Center	AFMC	Hill AFB installation management
78th Air Base Wing	(ABW)		Robins AFB, Georgia	Air Force; Sustainment; Center	AFMC	Robbins AFB installation management
87th Air Base Wing	(ABW)		Joint Base McGuire-Dix-Lakehurst, New Jersey	Twenty-First; Air Force	AMC	Joint Base McGuire-Dix-Lakehurst installation management
88th Air Base Wing	(ABW)		Wright-Patterson AFB, Ohio	Air Force; Life Cycle Management; Center	AFMC	Wright-Patterson AFB installation management
99th Air Base Wing	(ABW)		Nellis AFB, Nevada	USAF; Warfare; Center	ACC	Nellis AFB installation management
316th Wing	(WG)		Joint Base Andrews, Maryland		AFDW	Joint Base Andrews installation management UH-1N, HH-60W (Note: the HH-60W is in the process of replacing the UH-1N in the National Capital Region Executive Transport/continuity of government role)
377th Air Base Wing	(ABW)		Kirtland AFB, New Mexico	Twentieth; Air Force	AFGSC	Kirtland AFB installation management
501st Combat Support Wing	(CSW)		RAF Fairford, England	Third; Air Force	USAFE	Installation Management through subordinate Air Base Groups in Norway and at installations other than RAF Mildenhall and RAF Lakenheath in the U.K. (Note: The 501 CSW oversees four Air Base Groups operating a total of eleven installations in the U.K. and Norway; the 420th Air Base Group at Royal Air Force (RAF) Fairford and RAF Welford; the 421st Air Base Group at RAF Menwith Hill; the 422d Air Base Group at RAF Croughton; and the 423d Air Base Group at RAF Alconbury, including RAF Molesworth, RAF Upwood and Sola Air Station (Stavanger Air Base) in Norway.)
502nd Air Base Wing	(ABW)		Joint Base San Antonio (Fort Sam Houston), Texas	(Note: reports directly to AETC)	AETC	Joint Base San Antonio installation management
628th Air Base Wing	(ABW)		Joint Base Charleston, South Carolina	Twenty-First; Air Force	AMC	Joint Base Charleston installation management
633rd Air Base Wing	(ABW)		Joint Base Langley-Eustis, Virginia	Fifteenth; Air Force	ACC	Joint Base Langley-Eustis installation management
673rd Air Base Wing	(ABW)		Joint Base Elmendorf-Richardson, Alaska	Eleventh; Air Force	PACAF	Joint Base Elmendorf-Richardson installation management

== Inactive USAF Wings ==
Listed in date order of inactivation since the year 2000

Wing	(type)	Shield	Base	Air Force	Command	Inactivated
26th Information Operations Wing	(IOW)		Ramstein AB, Germany			5 Jul 2006
347th Rescue Wing	(RQW)		Moody AFB, Georgia			1 Oct 2006
38th Combat Support Wing	(CSW)		Ramstein AB, Germany			11 Sep 2007
939th Air Refueling Wing	(ARW)		Portland ARS, Oregon			30 Jun 2008
478th Aeronautical Systems Wing	(ASW)		Wright-Patterson AFB, Ohio			1 Jun 2009
61st Air Base Wing	(ABW)		Los Angeles AFB, California			30 Jul 2010
917th Wing	(WG)		Barksdale AFB, Louisiana			8 Jan 2011
43rd Airlift Wing	(AW)		Pope AFB, North Carolina			1 Mar 2011
615th Contingency Response Wing	(CRW)		Travis AFB, California			31 May 2012
309th Maintenance Wing	(MXW)		Hill AFB, Utah			12 Jul 2012
76th Maintenance Wing	(MXW)		Tinker AFB, Oklahoma			1 Oct 2012
402nd Maintenance Wing	(MXW)		Robins AFB, Georgia			1 Oct 2012
689th Combat Communications Wing	(CCW)		Robins AFB, Georgia			30 Sep 2013
440th Airlift Wing	(AW)		Pope Field, North Carolina			18 Sep 2016
21st Space Wing	(SW)		Peterson AFB, Colorado			24 Jul 2020
50th Space Wing	(SW)		Schriever AFB, Colorado			24 Jul 2020
460th Space Wing	(SW)		Buckley AFB, Colorado			24 Jul 2020
45th Space Wing	(SW)		Patrick AFB, Florida			11 May 2021
30th Space Wing	(SW)		Vandenberg AFB, California			14 May 2021
24th Special Operations Wing	(SOW)		Hurlburt Field, Florida			16 May 2025

== Active Air National Guard Wings ==
- List of Active Wings of the United States Air National Guard

== Air Expeditionary Wings ==
- List of Air Expeditionary units of the United States Air Force

== AFCON and MAJCOM wings ==
- List of Air Force-controlled wings of the United States Air Force
- List of MAJCOM wings of the United States Air Force

== See also ==
- List of wings of the United States Army Air Forces
- List of United States Navy aircraft wings
- List of active United States Air Force aircraft squadrons
