= Vienna Township, Trumbull County, Ohio =

Township in Ohio, US

- Township
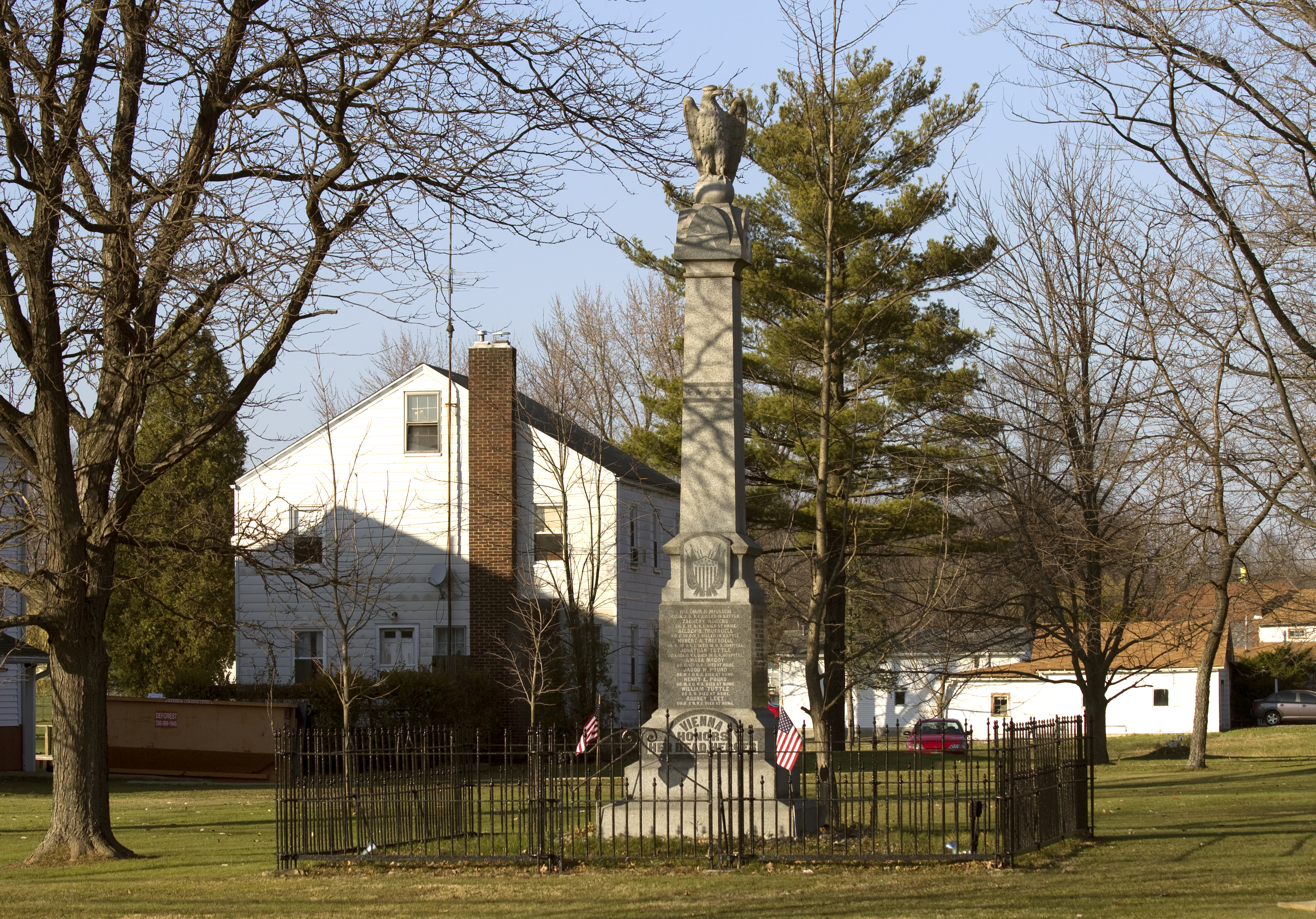
- War Memorial at Route 193 and Warren-Sharon Road

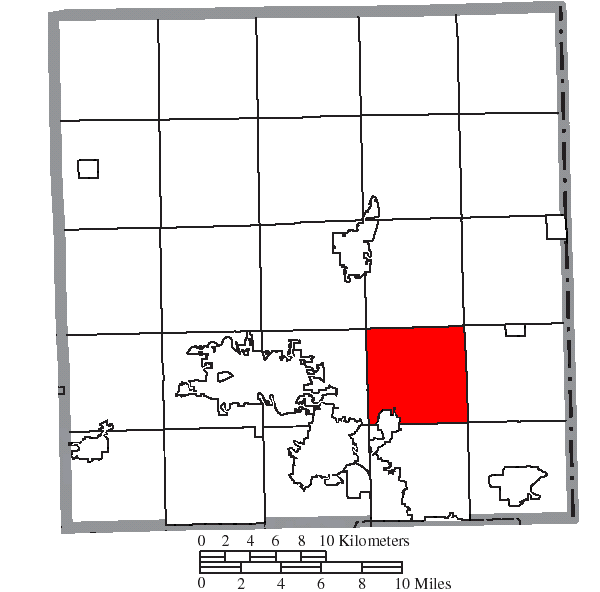
- Location of Vienna Township in Trumbull County
- Coordinates: 41°13′5″N 80°40′34″W
- Country: United States
- State: Ohio
- County: Trumbull

Area
  - Total: 23.5 sq mi (60.8 km^{2})
  - Land: 23.4 sq mi (60.6 km^{2})
  - Water: 0.12 sq mi (0.3 km^{2})
- Elevation: 1,158 ft (353 m)

Population (2020)
  - Total: 3,978
  - Density: 170/sq mi (65.6/km^{2})
- Time zone: UTC-5 (Eastern (EST))
  - Summer (DST): UTC-4 (EDT)
- ZIP code: 44473
- Area codes: 234/330
- FIPS code: 39-80052
- GNIS feature ID: 1087045
- Website: Township website

Vienna Township (/vaɪˈɛnə/ vy-EN-ə) is one of the twenty-four townships of Trumbull County, Ohio, United States. The 2020 census enumerated 3,978 people in the township.

== Geography ==
Located in the southeastern part of the county, Vienna borders the following townships:

- Fowler Township – north
- Hartford Township – northeast corner
- Brookfield Township – east
- Hubbard Township – southeast corner
- Liberty Township – south
- Weathersfield Township – southwest corner
- Howland Township – west
- Bazetta Township – northwest corner

Part of the city of Girard is located in southwestern Vienna Township. The census-designated place of Vienna Center is located in the center of the twenty-five-mile-square township.

== Name and history ==
Vienna Township is the only township so named in Ohio.

Vienna Township was established in the Connecticut Western Reserve. Under the direction of the Connecticut Land Company, this twenty-five-mile-square parcel, initially known as Township 4, Range 2, was surveyed in 1798. The Township's original proprietors were Uriel Holmes, Jr., Ephraim Root, and Timothy Burr.

Three of the Connecticut Land Company's surveyors, with their families, were among the first to settle in the Township in 1799. Dennis Clark Palmer (born 1775) was the first resident and would become Vienna's first township clerk in 1806. Fellow surveyor Samuel Hutchins, who was raised by Uriel Holmes, Jr., received 100 acres for his work. Isaac Flower, another surveyor, also owned 100 acres. Proprietor Ephraim Root visited Vienna in 1800, when he named Titus Brockway as his agent for land sales in the Township. In 1801, the resident heads of households in Vienna were “Isaac Flower, Isaac Flower, Jr., Levi Foote, James W. Foster, Samuel Hutchins, Daniel Humison [Humason], Dennis C. Palmer, Epenitus Rogers, Darius Woodford, Simon Wheeler, and Isaac Woodford."

The Connecticut Missionary Society sent 148 trained ministers to the Connecticut Western Reserve . The residents of Vienna Township were served by the reverends Joseph Badger, Thomas Robbins, and Nathan Bailey Derrow. In 1805, Robbins established Vienna's Congregational Church, which would adopt Presbyterianism in 1854, one of the earliest churches in the state.

Connecticut surrendered its sovereignty of the Western Reserve in 1800, and the land was absorbed into the Northwest Territory and as part of Ohio when that state entered the Union in 1803. The legal status of the township was ultimately settled on March 12, 1806, when Vienna Township (including until 1811 Brookfield Township) was organized and recognized by the Trumbull County Commissioners. On April 7, 1806, the Township's first government was elected:

- Trustees: Isaac Woodford, Isaac Flowers, Jr., and William Clinton
- Treasurer: Robert Hughs
- Constable: Isaac Humason
- Township Clerk: Dennis C. Palmer
- Fence Viewers: Samuel Hutchins and Robert Hughs
- Overseers of the Poor: Joseph Bartholomew and Slevin Higby
- Lister: Isaac Lloyd
- Appraiser: Isaac Lowrey
- Supervisors: Joel Humason and Jacob Middleswath

On June 20, 1810, a township green was established. Eight acres on the northwest corner of Vienna Center was purchased from proprietors Uriel Holmes and Ephraim Root by the Presbyterian Society (an ecclesiastical society formed for the purposes of non-theological business of the Vienna Presbyterian Church) for $20.00. Upon this green now stands Vienna Presbyterian Church, Vienna Methodist Church, the Copper Penny Masonic Lodge (built as the two-story Vienna School Number 1), the Soldiers and Sailors Monument, and the Bicentennial Gazebo. This parcel also contains Vienna Township Cemetery. One of the earliest buildings, constructed on the green in 1825, was used for church services and Township meetings and housed Vienna Academy, an early "English School" for boys. The building was moved in the early twentieth century to its current site on Youngstown-Kingsville Road north of Vienna Center. It serves as Vienna Township Hall.

Settlement in the Township and the Western Reserve was slow until after the War of 1812. Though primarily agricultural, Vienna Township was the home to a number of clock making factories established between 1812 and the 1830s, a frontier extension of one of Connecticut's signal industries. Vienna's clock makers, including brothers Lambert W. and Thomas Lewis, Phineas Deming, Joel J. Hummason, Jr., John C. McMaster, Ansel Merrell, and Abel Tyler, manufactured tall case and shelf wooden-work clocks, using water power supplied by the Township's streams and creeks.

An economic boom began in 1866, when the first coal mine was opened by businessman Ira B. Mackey, Jr. Vienna was inundated with men seeking work in some 20 mines opened over the next 20 years. The built environment of Vienna Center (also called Vienna Village) changed with the construction of 32 saloons, bar-rooms, and billiard parlors. Some Vienna residents responded by establishing temperance societies. Tensard Mackey (Ira B. Mackey's brother) operated a temperance hotel on the northeast corner of Vienna Center; this building stood until 1966. Temperance reform nationwide was the work of women, and in 1880 Vienna's temperance societies petitioned the state to allow women to vote on local issues.

Another outcome of Vienna's coal mining was the creation of Ohio's first mining safety law in 1874. Future State Inspector of Mines Andrew Roy was a member of a team appointed by the Ohio General Assembly to investigate and report on the working conditions of miners throughout the state. The team visited the Vienna Coal Company's mine in August 1871. Roy included in his section of the report what he saw in Vienna.

Vienna Township reverted to an agricultural community after the mining era. Not until the late 1920s did its population noticeably rise, and the increase was due in great part to immigrants from Southern and Eastern Europe who purchased farms and worked in the nearby steel and iron mills of Youngstown, Niles, and Girard in Ohio and Sharon in Pennsylvania. The construction of the Youngstown-Warren Regional Airport, one of the last Works Progress Administration projects, in 1939–40, and of the Youngstown-Warren Air Reserve Station in the 1950s, altered the Township's landscape but did not deter post-World War II population growth in the Township. With the demise of the steel and iron industries in the 1970s, Vienna Township's population has again been declining.

== Government and public safety ==
The township is governed by a three-member board of trustees. Each member is elected in November of odd-numbered years to a four-year term beginning on the following January 1. Two are elected in the year after the presidential election and one is elected in the year before it. An elected township fiscal officer serves a four-year term beginning on April 1 of the year after the election, which is held in November of the year before the presidential election. Vacancies in the fiscal officership or on the board of trustees are filled by the remaining trustees.

=== Township officials ===
Township Officials
Party	Name	Position
R	Richard Dascenzo Jr.	Trustee
R	Michael Haddle	Trustee
D	Phil M. Pegg	Trustee
R	Jason Miner	Fiscal Officer

The Vienna Volunteer Fire Department was organized in 1940, the second so organized in Trumbull County.

== Schools ==
Vienna Township and Fowler Township created a joint school district in 1961. A five-member board of education oversees what is now called the Mathews Local School District and its three schools: Baker Elementary School, Currie Elementary School, and Mathews Junior-Senior High School. Each school was named after a revered schoolteacher in the district.

== Notable people ==
- Samuel Augustus Fuller (August 8, 1837 – October 23, 1891), steel industry executive
- Alphonso Hart (July 4, 1830 – December 23, 1910), U.S. Representative, Ohio State Senator, and the 11th Lieutenant Governor of Ohio
- John Hutchins (July 25, 1812 – November 20, 1891), U.S. Representative from Ohio
