= YNG =

YNG can refer to:

- YNG, IATA code for Youngstown–Warren Regional Airport in Ohio
- Yng or Yngvi, an older name for Freyr in Norse mythology
- A US Navy hull classification symbol: Net gate craft (YNG)
