= Vienna Center, Ohio =

- Census-designated place
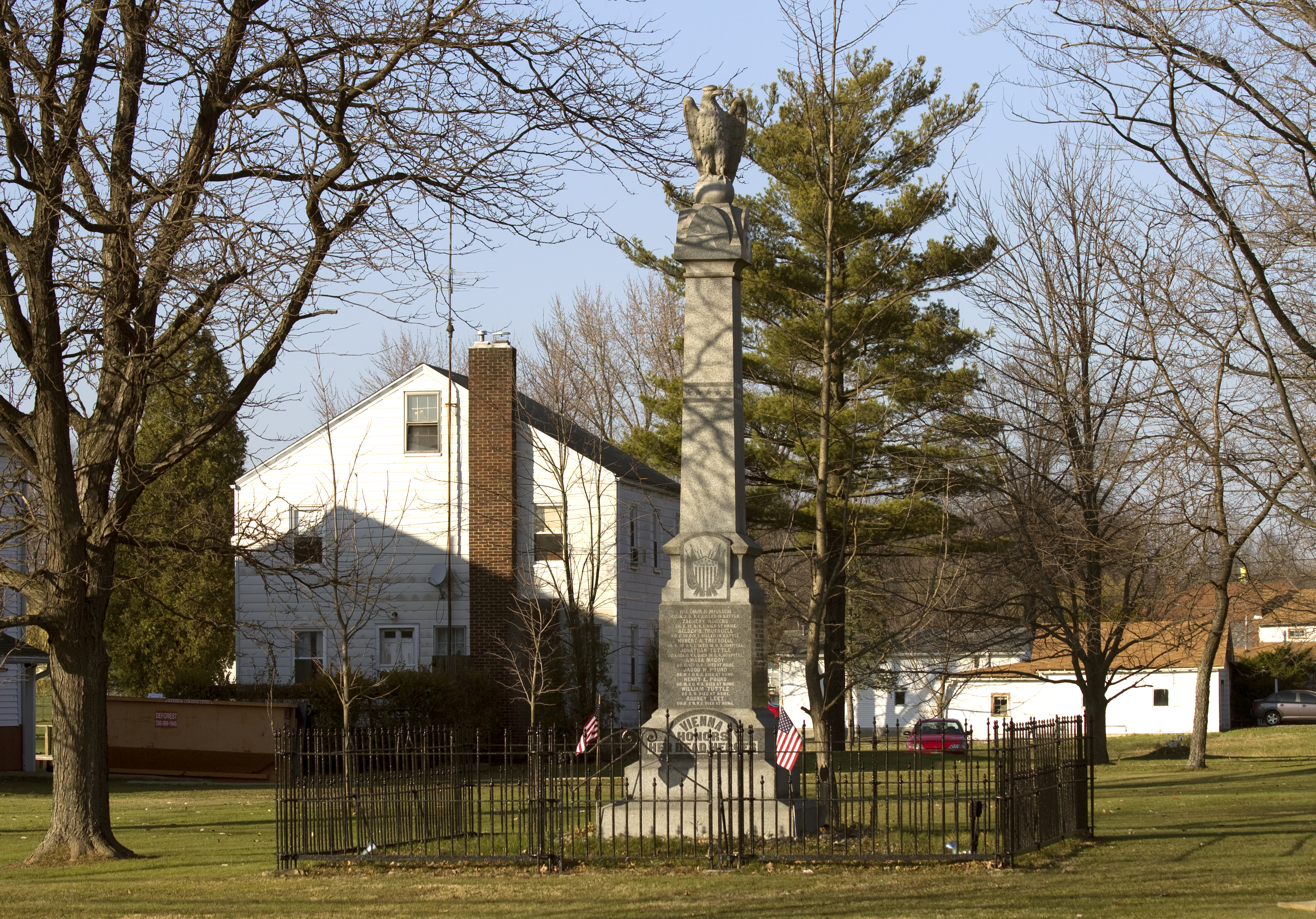
- War Memorial at State Route 193 and Warren-Sharon Road

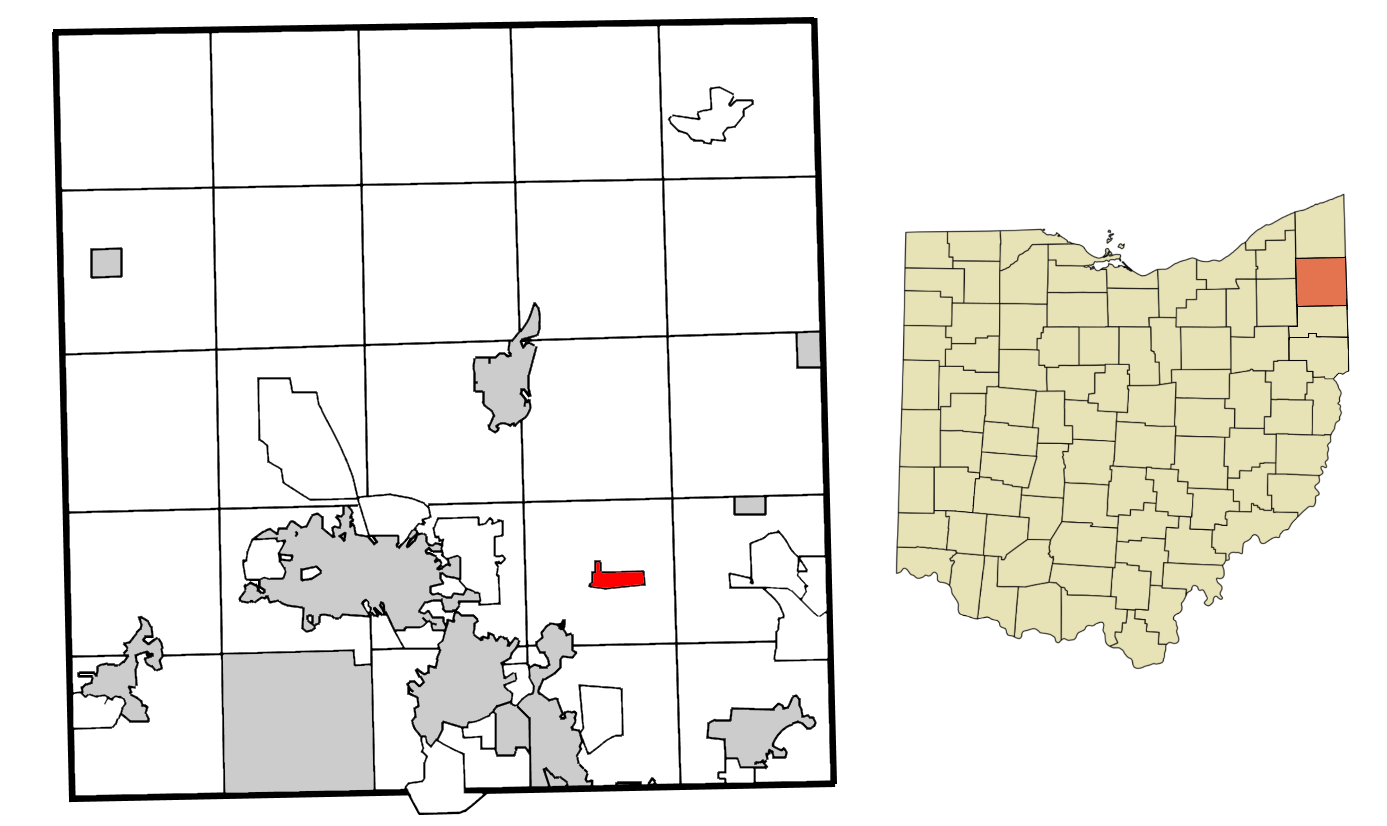
- Location of Vienna Center in Trumbull County, Ohio.
- Coordinates: 41°14′04″N 80°39′15″W
- Country: United States
- State: Ohio
- County: Trumbull

Area
  - Total: 0.96 sq mi (2.48 km^{2})
  - Land: 0.96 sq mi (2.48 km^{2})
  - Water: 0 sq mi (0.00 km^{2})
- Elevation: 1,155 ft (352 m)

Population (2020)
  - Total: 622
  - Density: 650.1/sq mi (251.02/km^{2})
- Time zone: UTC-5 (Eastern (EST))
  - Summer (DST): UTC-4 (EDT)
- FIPS code: 39-80066
- GNIS feature ID: 2393832

Vienna Center, also known as Vienna (/vaɪˈɛnə/ vy-EN-ə), is an unincorporated community and census-designated place in central Vienna Township, Trumbull County, Ohio, United States. The population was 622 at the 2020 census. It is part of the Youngstown–Warren metropolitan area.

== History ==
Vienna Township was established as Township 4, Range 2 in the Connecticut Western Reserve. It was surveyed in 1798 by a group led by Uriel Holmes under the direction of the Connecticut Land Company. The township's original settlers were Dennis Palmer and Isaac Flower. Thomas Robbins of the Connecticut Missionary Society established Vienna's Congregational Church in 1805, which would adopt Presbyterianism in 1854, one of the earliest churches in the state. The Western Reserve was absorbed into the Northwest Territory and later as part of Ohio in 1803.

On June 20, 1810, a township green was established in what would be called Vienna Center. Eight acres on the northwest corner of Vienna Center were purchased by the community's Presbyterian Society for $20.00. Upon this green now stands Vienna Presbyterian Church, Vienna Methodist Church, the Copper Penny Masonic Lodge (built as the two-story Vienna School Number 1), the Soldiers and Sailors Monument, Bicentennial Gazebo, and the Vienna Township Cemetery. One of the earliest buildings, constructed on the green in 1825, was used for church services, township meetings and housed Vienna Academy, an early "English School" for boys. The building was moved in the early 20th century to its current site on Youngstown-Kingsville Road north of Vienna Center and serves as Vienna Township Hall.

Settlement in the Township and the Western Reserve was slow until after the War of 1812. Though primarily agricultural, Vienna Township was the home to several clock-making factories established between 1812 and the 1830s, a frontier extension of one of Connecticut's signal industries. Vienna's clock makers, including brothers Lambert W. and Thomas Lewis, Phineas Deming, Joel J. Hummason, Jr., John C. McMaster, Ansel Merrell, and Abel Tyler, manufactured tall case and shelf wooden-work clocks, using water power supplied by the Township's streams and creeks.

An economic boom began in 1866, when the first coal mine was opened by businessman Ira B. Mackey, Jr. Vienna was inundated with men seeking work in some 20 mines opened over the next 20 years. The built environment of Vienna Center (also called Vienna Village) changed with the construction of 32 saloons, bar-rooms, and billiard parlors. Some Vienna residents responded by establishing temperance societies. Tensard Mackey (Ira B. Mackey's brother) operated a temperance hotel on the northeast corner of Vienna Center; this building stood until 1966. Temperance reform nationwide was the work of women, and in 1880 Vienna's temperance societies petitioned the state to allow women to vote on local issues.

Another outcome of Vienna's coal mining was the creation of Ohio's first mining safety law in 1874. Future State Inspector of Mines Andrew Roy was a member of a team appointed by the Ohio General Assembly to investigate and report on the working conditions of miners throughout the state. The team visited the Vienna Coal Company's mine in August 1871. Roy included in his section of the report what he saw in Vienna.

The Youngstown-Warren Regional Airport, one of the last Works Progress Administration projects, and the Youngstown-Warren Air Reserve Station were constructed near the community in 1939 and the 1950s.

== Geography ==
According to the United States Census Bureau, the CDP has a total area of 4.2 square miles (11 km^{2}), all land.

The ZIP code of its post office is 44473, but under the name of Vienna, rather than Vienna Center.

== Demographics ==
Historical population
Census	Pop.	Note	%±
2000	994		—
2010	650		−34.6%
2020	622		−4.3%
U.S. Decennial Census

As of the census of 2000, there were 994 people, 371 households, and 278 families residing in the CDP. The population density was 234.7 inhabitants per square mile (90.6/km^{2}). There were 383 housing units at an average density of 90.4 per square mile (34.9/km^{2}). The racial makeup of the CDP was 98.49% White, 0.91% African American, 0.10% Native American, 0.20% Asian, and 0.30% from two or more races. Hispanic or Latino of any race were 0.60% of the population.

There were 371 households, out of which 31.3% had children under the age of 18 living with them, 68.5% were married couples living together, 4.9% had a female householder with no husband present, and 24.8% were non-families. 20.2% of all households were made up of individuals, and 7.8% had someone living alone who was 65 years of age or older. The average household size was 2.67 and the average family size was 3.13.

In the CDP the population was spread out, with 24.3% under the age of 18, 7.2% from 18 to 24, 27.5% from 25 to 44, 27.6% from 45 to 64, and 13.4% who were 65 years of age or older. The median age was 40 years. For every 100 females there were 106.2 males. For every 100 females age 18 and over, there were 104.3 males.

The median income for a household in the CDP was $47,115, and the median income for a family was $51,923. Males had a median income of $35,781 versus $26,346 for females. The per capita income for the CDP was $17,943. About 1.8% of families and 3.1% of the population were below the poverty line, including 4.1% of those under age 18 and 5.8% of those age 65 or over.

== Education ==
Vienna Township and Fowler Township created a joint school district in 1961. A five-member board of education oversees what is now called the Mathews Local School District and its three schools: Baker Elementary School, Currie Elementary School, and Mathews Junior-Senior High School. Each school was named after a revered schoolteacher in the district.
