= Air Force Medical Support Agency =

- Active: 1978–2019
- Country: United States
- Branch: United States Air Force
- Role: Administrative support for Air Force medical units
- Decorations: Air Force Organizational Excellence Award

Insignia
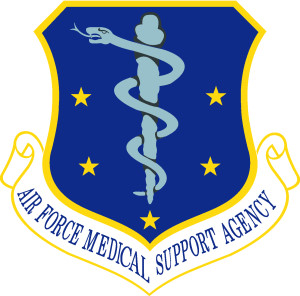
- Air Force Medical Support Agency emblem (Note: Approved 13 August 1984.)

The Air Force Medical Support Agency was an agency that provided support to the surgeon general of the United States Air Force in medical force management. It also provided operational support for medical capabilities used in global, homeland security and force health protection.

== History ==
The agency was inactivated on 28 June 2019, and its functions were consolidated into the Air Force Medical Operations Agency, which became the Air Force Medical Readiness Agency.

== Lineage ==
- Established as the Air Force Medical Service Center and activated on 1 July 1978
- Redesignated Air Force Office of Medical Support on 1 July 1985
- Redesignated Air Force Medical Support Agency on 1 July 1992

Inactivated on 28 June 2019

=== Assignments ===
- United States Air Force, 1 July 1978 – 28 June 2018

=== Status ===
- Separate Operating Agency, 1 July 1978
- Field Operating Agency, 5 February 1991 – 28 June 2019

=== Stations ===
- Brooks Air Force Base, Texas, 1 July 1978
- Arlington, Virginia, Unknown – 28 June 2019
