= Mathews High School (Ohio) =

Vienna Mathews High School
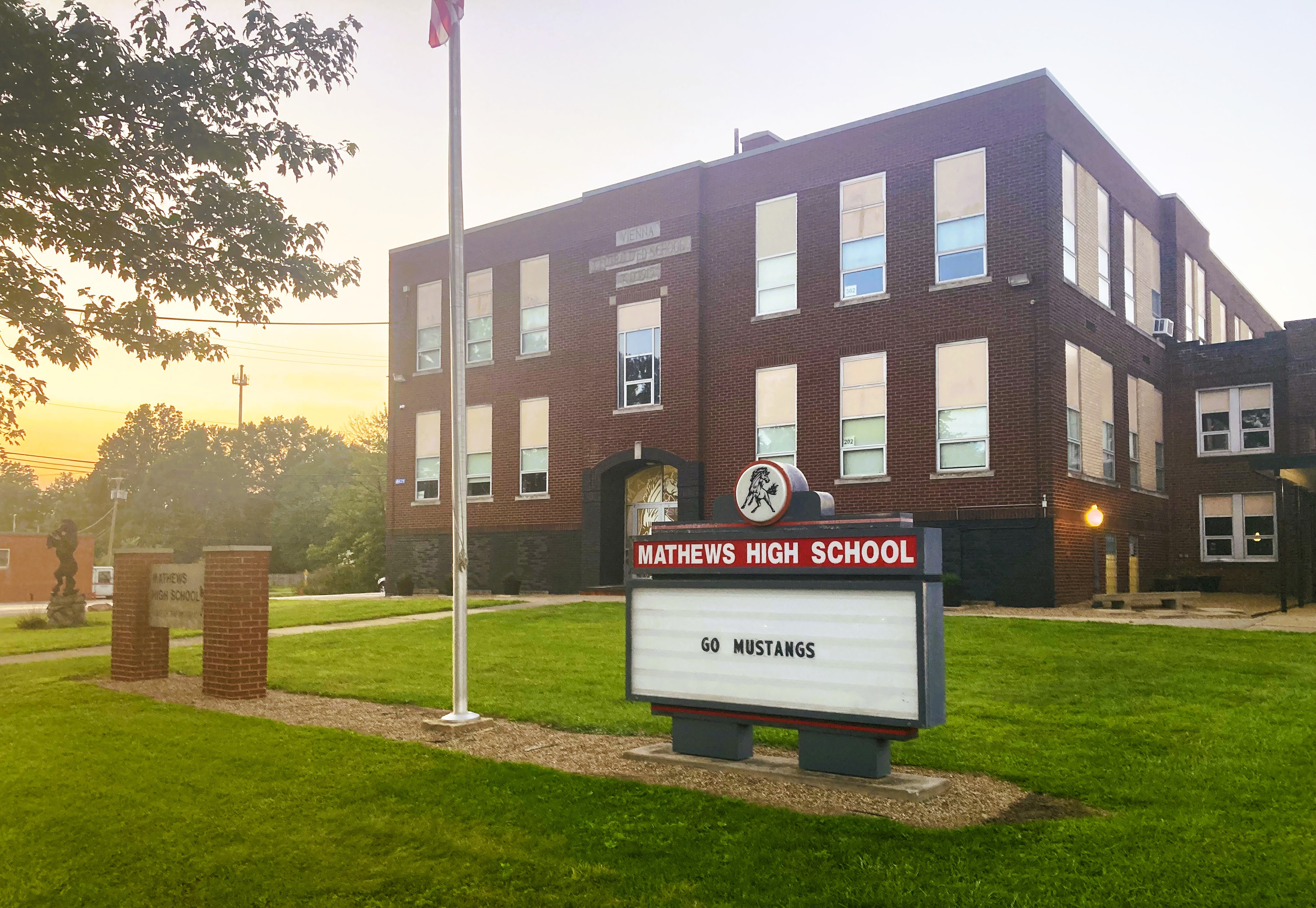

Location
- 4429 Warren-Sharon Road; Vienna, Ohio; United States; 41°14′18″N 80°39′35″W

Information
- Type: Public
- Opened: 1961
- School district: Mathews Local School District
- NCES School ID: 390501503852
- Teaching staff: 20.43 (FTE)
- Grades: 9-12
- Enrollment: 175 (2024–2025)
- Student to teacher ratio: 8.57
- Colors: Red and black
- Athletics conference: Northeastern Athletic Conference
- Nickname: Mustangs
- Website: Mathews High School

Mathews High School is a public high school in Vienna, Ohio. It is the only high school in the Mathews Local School District. Their nickname is the Mustangs and compete as a member of the Ohio High School Athletic Association and is a member of the Northeastern Athletic Conference.

== History ==
Mathews High School opened in 1961 after the consolidation of Vienna Centralized School and Fowler Township School. Mathews High School is housed at the former Vienna Centralized School, which opened in 1915, making it one of the oldest school buildings in Trumbull County. The high school campus has housed students in grades 6–12 as of 2022, following the closures of Neal Middle School in 2011, and Baker School in 2022. Currie Elementary School was closed following the 2023–24 school year, and its K–5 students are now housed at Baker School.

In 1995, a fire broke out on the 3rd floor of the high school, causing $1,000,000 in damages ($2.1-2.13 million today.) The entire 3rd floor of the building was renovated, with new computers, textbooks, walls, floors, doors, etc.

Following several failed levy's and ongoing financial crises, In March 2026, Mathews Board of Education proposed to cut several sporting programs including soccer, indoor track and esports, along with coaching salaries being frozen for two years, with the district facing a property tax decrease of between $70,000 to $250,000, with cutting the mentioned sports and freezing coaching salaries saving the school $40,000 to $45,000. Roughly a week later on March 18, Mathew's superintendent Russell McQuaide announced the school board won't cut any sporting programs at this time but did vote to freeze coaching salaries as previously mentioned. McQuaide said Mathews is facing a $574,000 deficit next school year and said that cuts will be possible in the near future.

== Athletics ==
Mathews High School currently offers:

- Baseball
- Basketball
- Cross country
- Cheerleading
- Esports
- Football
- Golf
- Soccer
- Softball
- Track and field (indoor and outdoor)
- Volleyball

=== State championships ===
- Girls basketball – 1988

=== Facilities ===
==== Vienna Memorial Gymnasium ====
Vienna Memorial Gymnasium is Mathews High School's gymnasium, the home of Rex Leach Court. On January 17, 2014, Mathew's basketball court was renamed after Rex Leach, a former all-star player for the Vienna Flyers, who actively holds numerous state records.

==== Booster Field ====
Booster Field, opened in 1967 is Mathews High School's football and soccer stadium, located at 4095 Sheridan Drive. The stadium was named in recognition of the Mathews Football Boosters Club, who helped Mathews High School open their football stadium and form their football team. The Boosters Club raised money to fund building a stadium through fundraising events, such as raffles, bake sales, benefit dinners, etc. The stadium features a seating compacity of around 2,100, a press box, grass field, electronic scoreboard, public address system, concession stands and restroom facilities, within an enclosed fence. Booster Field underwent renovations in 2022, with the stadium acquiring new bleachers, lighting, press box and sound systems, along with other electronical updates, which costed the school $800,000, paid for by an improvement levy. The project was finished in October 2022.
