= Air and Space Organizational Excellence Award =

United States Air Force and United States Space Force unit award

- Organizational Excellence Award ribbon Ribbon with "V" Device (discontinued January 1, 2014)
- Type: Military ribbon
- Presented by: the Department of the Air Force
- Eligibility: unique, unnumbered organizations or activities that perform functions normally performed by numbered air wings, groups, squadrons, etc.
- Status: Current
- Established: 26 August 1969
- Air Force Organizational Excellence Award Streamer Air Force Organizational Excellence Award Streamer for valor (discontinued January 1, 2014)

Precedence
- Next (higher): Army: Superior Unit Award; Naval Service: Navy Meritorious Unit Commendation; Air and Space Forces: Air and Space Outstanding Unit Award; Coast Guard: Meritorious Team Commendation
- Equivalent: Naval Service: Navy "E" Ribbon; Coast Guard: Coast Guard "E" Ribbon
- Next (lower): Prisoner of War Medal

The Air and Space Organizational Excellence Award (ASOEA) is a unit award of the United States Air Force and United States Space Force. It was created by the Secretary of the Air Force on 26 August 1969 as the Air Force Outstanding Unit Award. The award is presented to Air Force and Space Force internal organizations that are entities within larger organizations. Examples of eligible organizations are MAJCOM headquarters, Field Operating Agencies, Direct Reporting Units, and other unique unnumbered organizations.

On 16 November 2020, the Air Force Organizational Excellence Award was renamed the Air and Space Organizational Excellence Award by the Secretary of the Air Force.

== Award criteria ==
The Air and Space Organizational Excellence Award is awarded to recognize the achievements and accomplishments of various Air Force and Space Force activities and organizations. It is awarded to internal Air Force and Space Force organizations that are entities of larger organizations. These are unique, unnumbered organizations or activities that perform functions typically fulfilled by numbered wings, groups, or squadrons.

== Description ==
The Air and Space Organizational Excellence Award is presented as a service ribbon only. The ribbon is Old Glory Red with a 1/8 in (3.2 mm) wide Old Glory Blue as the center stripe, flanked by thin 1/16 in (1.6 mm) white stripes. At the edges are 1/8 in (3.2 mm) wide Old Glory Blue stripes bordered, on the inside, by thin 1/16 in (1.6 mm) white stripes.

Additional awards are denoted by bronze oak leaf clusters worn on the ribbon. The "V" device (discontinued January 1, 2014) was authorized to be worn for the units participating in combat operations or direct combat support.
