= Air Force Medical Command =

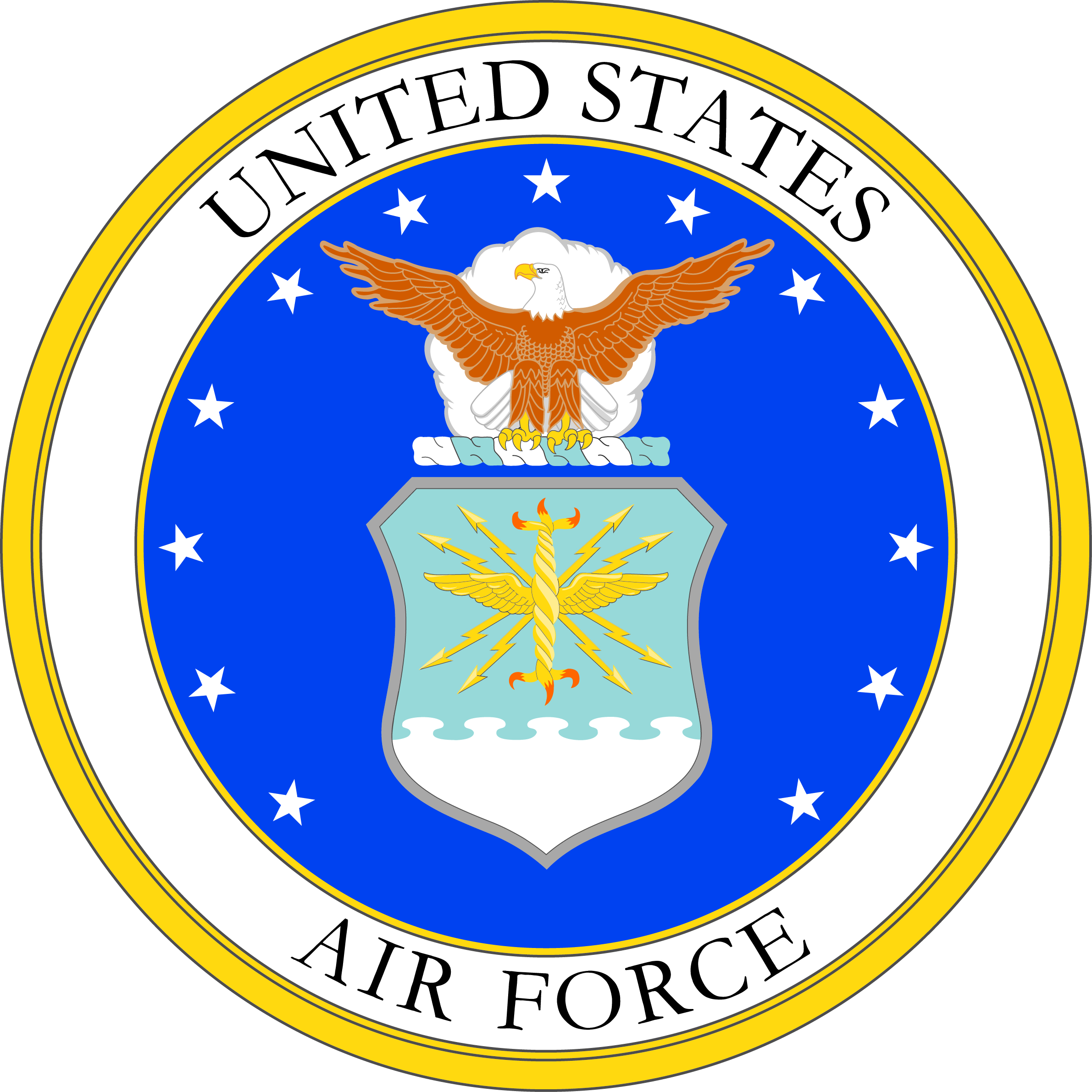
Air Force Medical Command

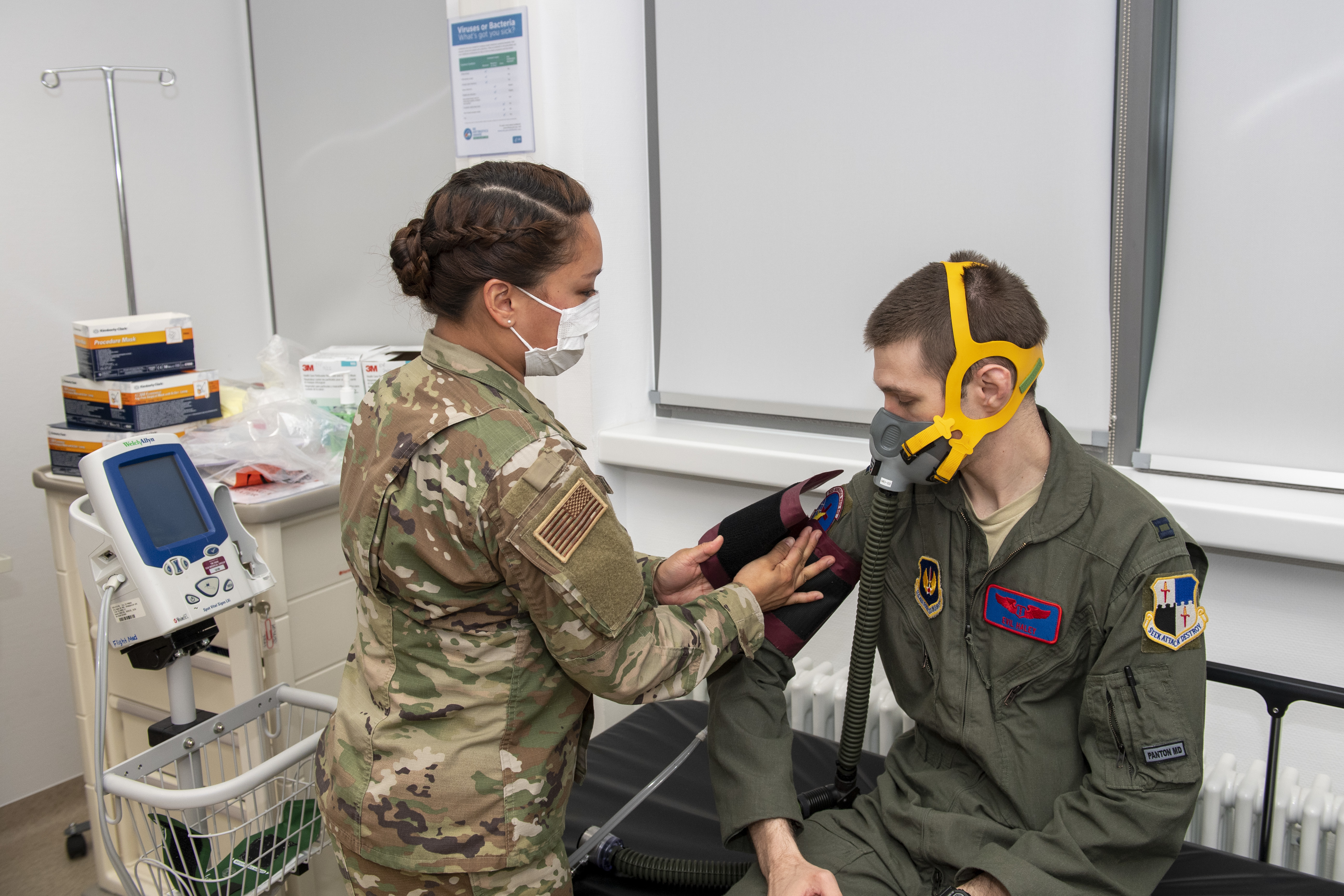
- An operational medicine technician examining an Air Force flight surgeon
- Active: 1992–present
- Country: United States
- Branch: United States Air Force
- Role: Command of United States Air Force medical units
- Part of: United States Air Force
- Garrison/HQ: Falls Church, Virginia
- Decorations: Air Force Organizational Excellence Award

Insignia
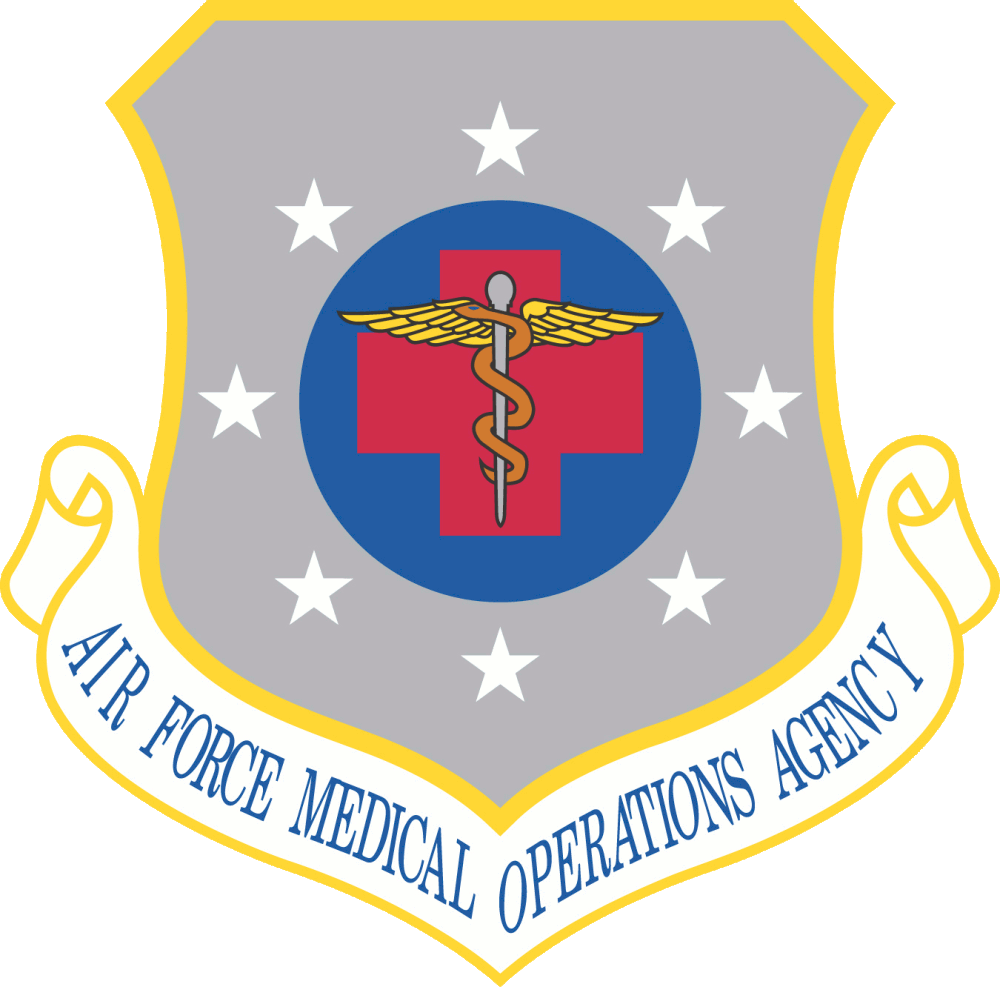
- Air Force Medical Command emblem (Note: Approved 22 May 1996.)

The Air Force Medical Command is a Direct Reporting Unit (Note: AFMEDCOM is not a Major Command, despite the naming similarity to them.) of the United States Air Force, colocated at Falls Church, Virginia, with the Defense Health Agency. It is commanded by the surgeon general of the United States Air Force and provides command and direction for Air Force medical units.

The organization was first organized as the Air Force Medical Operations Agency in July 1992, as a companion to the Air Force Medical Support Agency. This dual management continued until June 2019, when the two agencies were combined as the Air Force Medical Readiness Agency. Starting in 2023, the Air Force began combining elements of its surgeon general's staff with the agency with this agency to take full control of Air Force medical units, achieving initial operational capability in March 2025.

== Components ==
As of January 2026, the Air Force is in the process of moving all medical units into the command. Currently, the structure is as follows:

- Medical Readiness Command-Alpha
  - 59th Medical Wing, at Joint Base San Antonio-Lackland
    - Lackland Medical Group, at Joint Base San Antonio-Lackland
    - Lackland Dental Group, at Joint Base San Antonio-Lackland
    - 559th Medical Group, at Joint Base San Antonio-Lackland
    - 59th Training Group, at Joint Base San Antonio-Fort Sam Houston
    - 59th Medical Support Group, at Joint Base San Antonio-Lackland
    - Fort Sam Houston Medical Group, at Joint Base San Antonio-Fort Sam Houston
  - 329th Medical Wing, at Joint Base San Antonio-Lackland (Medical Groups formerly under the control of AMC or AFRC Wings)
    - Travis Medical Group, at Travis Air Force Base
    - Scott Medical Group, at Scott Air Force Base
    - MacDill Medical Group, at MacDill Air Force Base
    - Fairchild Medical Group, at Fairchild Air Force Base
    - McConnell Medial Group, at McConnell Air Force Base
    - Little Rock Medical Group, at Little Rock Air Force Base
    - Dover Medical Group, at Dover Air Force Base
    - McGuire Medical Group, at Joint Base McGuire-Dix-Lakehurst
    - Charleston Medical Group, at Joint Base Charleston
    - 62nd Medical Squadron, at McChord Field component of Joint Base Lewis McChord
    - AFRC medical units
  - 359th Medical Wing, at Joint Base San Antonio-Lackland (Medical Groups formerly under the control of AETC or AFGSC Wings)
    - Altus Medical Group, at Altus Air Force Base
    - Barksdale Medical Group, at Barksdale Air Force Base
    - Columbus Medical Group, at Columbus Air Force Base
    - Dyess Medical Group, at Dyess Air Force Base
    - Ellsworth Medical Group, at Ellsworth Air Force Base
    - F.E. Warren Medical Group, at F.E. Warren Air Force Base
    - Goodfellow Medical Group, at Goodfellow Air Force Base
    - Holloman Medical Group, at Holloman Air Force Base
    - Keesler Medical Group, at Keesler Air Force Base
    - Kirtland Medical Group, at Kirtland Air Force Base
    - Laughlin Medical Group, at Laughlin Air Force Base
    - Luke Medical Group, at Luke Air Force Base
    - Malmstrom Medical Group, at Malmstrom Air Force Base
    - Maxwell Medical Group, at Maxwell Air Force Base
    - Minot Medical Group, at Minot Air Force Base
    - Sheppard Group, at Sheppard Air Force Base
    - Vance Medical Group, at Vance Air Force Base
    - Whiteman Medical Group, at Whiteman Air Force Base
  - 656th Medical Wing, at Joint Base Pearl Harbor–Hickam, Hawaii (Medical Groups formerly under the control of PACAF Wings)
    - Andersen Medical Group, at Andersen Air Force Base
    - Eielson Medical Group, at Eielson Air Force Base
    - Elmendorf Medical Group, at Joint Base Elmendorf-Richardson
    - Hickam Medical Group, at Joint Base Pearl Harbor–Hickam
    - Kadena Medical Group, at Kadena Air Base
    - Kunsan Medical Group, at Kunsan Air Base
    - Misawa Medical Group, at Misawa Air Base
    - Osan Medical Group, at Osan Air Base
    - Yokota Medical Group, at Yokota Air Base
- Medical Readiness Command-Bravo
  - 73rd Medical Wing, at Falls Church, Virginia (Medical Groups at USSF Bases, the USAFA, or formerly under the control of AFSOC or AFMC Wings)
    - Air Force Academy Medical Group, at the U.S. Air Force Academy
    - Arnold Medical Squadron, at Arnold Air Force Base
    - Buckley Medical Group, at Buckley Space Force Base
    - Cannon Medical Group, at Cannon Air Force Base
    - Edwards Medical Group, at Edwards Air Force Base
    - Eglin Medical Group, at Eglin Air Force Base
    - Hanscom Medical Squadron, at Hanscom Air Force Base
    - Hill Medical Group, at Hill Air Force Base
    - Hurlburt Medical Group, at Hurlburt Field
    - Los Angeles Medical Squadron, at Los Angeles Air Force Base
    - Patrick Medical Group, at Patrick Space Force Base
    - Robins Medical Group, at Robins Air Force Base
    - Schriever Medical Group/Peterson Clinic, at Peterson Space Force Base & Schriever Space Force Base
    - Tinker Medical Group, at Tinker Air Force Base
    - Vandenberg Medical Group, at Vandenberg Space Force Base
    - Wright-Patterson Medical Group, at Wright-Patterson Air Force Base
  - 79th Medical Wing, at Falls Church, Virginia (Medical Groups formerly under the control of AFDW or ACC Wings)
    - Anacostia-Bolling Medical Squadron, at Joint Base Anacostia-Bolling
    - Andrews Medical Group, at Joint Base Andrews
    - Beale Medical Group, at Beale Air Force Base
    - Creech Medical Group, at Creech Air Force Base
    - Davis-Monthan Medical Group, at Davis-Monthan Air Force Base
    - Grand Forks Medical Group, at Grand Forks Air Force Base
    - Langley Medical Group, at Joint Base Langley-Eustis
    - Moody Medical Group, at Moody Air Force Base
    - Mountain Home Medical Group, at Mountain Home Air Force Base
    - Nellis Medical Group, at Nellis Air Force Base
    - Offutt Medical Group, at Offutt Air Force Base
    - Seymour Johnson Medical Group, at Seymour Johnson Air Force Base
    - Shaw Medical Group, at Shaw Air Force Base
  - 779th Medical Wing, at Sembach Kaserne, Germany (Medical Groups formerly under the control of USAFE-AFAFRICA Wings)
    - Aviano Medical Group, at Aviano Air Base
    - Incirlik Medical Group, at Incirlik Air Base
    - Lakenheath Medical Group, at RAF Lakenheath
    - Ramstein Medical Group, at Ramstein Air Base
    - Spangdahlem Medical Group, at Spangdahlem Air Base

== Mission ==
The Air Force Medical Command mission is to generate medically ready forces, provide installation support, and improve its partnership with the Defense Health Agency to optimize health care delivery.

== History ==
In 1992, the Air Force Medical Operations Agency was formed from the flight medicine department of the Air Force Office of Medical Support, which became the Air Force Medical Support Agency. Though it originally cared for operational matters under the direction of the Surgeon General of the United States Air Force, the agency moved to a more proactive approach, managing population health rather than episodic care to improve the health and lives of Air Force members and their families. The agency expanded to optimizing medical resources, radiation protection, aerospace medicine, and clinical service.

On 28 June 2019 the split responsibility for medical services ended, as the Air Force Medical Support Agency's functions were consolidated into the agency, which was redesignated the Air Force Medical Readiness Agency (AFMRA). The fiscal year 2017 National Defense Authorization Act required the Air Force to establish a readiness focused medical organization. Activating AFMRA streamlined Air Force medical organization from a dual focus on health benefit delivery and readiness performed by two agencies, to one focused on readiness. The organization oversaw medical readiness programs, expeditionary medical capabilities and mission support requirements. It also assisted the Air Force surgeon general in developing policy to support Air Force major commands and base-level unit missions. (Note: The Surgeon General press release characterizes this as an inactivation of the AF Medical Operations Agency and an activation of the AF Medical Readiness Agency.)

The Air Force determined to posture the Air Force Medical Service to better serve installation commanders and the medical readiness of airmen and guardians. The initial step was to reform the Air Force Medical Readiness Agency to transform elements of the office Air Force Surgeon General as Air Force Medical (Agency), which achieved initial operational capability in October 2023. This would lead to the formation of Air Force Medical Command as a Direct Reporting Unit aligned with the Secretary of the Air Force’s readiness priorities. “This alignment will improve the Air Force’s ability to generate medically ready forces, provide installation support, and improve our partnership with the Defense Health Agency to optimize health care delivery,” according to Lt Gen Robert Miller, the Air Force surgeon general. The implementation will take place in phases. The Air Force surgeon general serves as the command's commander.

In August 2024, the unit was redesignated Air Force Medical Command and two subcommands were organized the following month. With the activation of six of the planned seven medical wings in March 2025, the command reached initial operational capability. Personnel began transferring in to the new command in a process that will extend over two years as old medical units assigned to Major Air Commands are inactivated and replaced by new units assigned to AF Medical Command's new wings.

== Lineage ==
- Established as the Air Force Medical Operations Agency and activated on 1 July 1992

Redesignated Air Force Medical Readiness Agency on 28 June 2019
Redesignated Air Force Medical on 1 October 2023
Redesignated Air Force Medical Command on 15 August 2024

=== Assignments ===
- United States Air Force, 1 July 1992 – present

=== Status ===
- Field Operating Agency, 1 July 1992
- Direct Reporting Unit, 15 August 2024 – present

=== Stations ===
- Falls Church, Virginia, 1 July 1992 – present

=== Components ===
- Medical Readiness Command-Alpha, 15 September 2024 – present
- Medical Readiness Command-Bravo, 15 September 2024 – present

=== Awards ===
Award streamer	Award	Dates	Notes
	Air Force Organizational Excellence Award	1 September 2001 – 31 August 2003	Air Force Medical Operations Agency
	Air Force Organizational Excellence Award	1 January 2014 – 31 December 2015	Air Force Medical Operations Agency
	Air Force Organizational Excellence Award	1 January 2019 – 31 December 2020	Air Force Medical Operations Agency (later Air Force Medical Readiness Agency)
