= List of major commands of the United States Air Force =

This is a list of major commands (MAJCOM) of the United States Air Force.

A major command is a significant Air Force organization subordinate to Headquarters, US Air Force. Major commands have a headquarters staff and subordinate organizations, typically formed in numbered air forces, centers, wings, and groups.

Historically, a MAJCOM is the highest level of command, only below Headquarters Air Force (HAF), and directly above numbered air forces (NAFs).

The USAF is organized on a functional basis in the United States and a geographical basis overseas. A major command (MAJCOM) represents a major Air Force subdivision having a specific portion of the Air Force mission. Each MAJCOM is directly subordinate to Headquarters, Air Force. MAJCOMs are interrelated and complementary, providing offensive, defensive, and support elements. An operational command consists (in whole or in part) of strategic, tactical, or defense forces; or of flying forces that directly support such forces. A support command may provide supplies, weapon systems, support systems, operational support equipment, combat material, maintenance, surface transportation, education and training, or special services and other supported organizations.

From 1948 to 1991 MAJCOMs had the authority to form wings using manpower authorizations under their control. Each MAJCOM or other organization reporting directly to USAF was assigned a block of four digit numbers to use for units it organized. The system terminated in 1991 when USAF assumed control of all units except for provisional ones. While the majority of MAJCOM wings were support units, combat commands could (and did) create combat units on their own as shown at List of MAJCOM wings of the United States Air Force.

The USAF's last major reorganization of commands was in 1992. In July 2006, the Air Force Network Operations (AFNETOPS) command was stood up at Barksdale Air Force Base. At the time, it was anticipated that it would be transformed into a new MAJCOM: the Air Force Cyber Command. However, this did not occur, and AFNETOPS was integrated into Air Force Space Command.

On 20 December 2019, the United States Space Force became an independent military service and Air Force Space Command was transferred and redesignated as Space Operations Command.

Despite the naming similarity to other major commands, the Air Force Medical Command (AFMEDCOM) is not a MAJCOM, rather a Direct Reporting Unit (DRU).

Since its inception in 1947, a total of 27 organizations have been designated as major commands. Over time, the role of MAJCOMs have changed: some were replaced with NAFs, while some NAFs were replaced with MAJCOMs.

Currently, the USAF is organized into nine MAJCOMS (seven functional and two geographic), with the Air National Guard component reporting to Headquarters, United States Air Force (HAF). The most recent major command, Air Force Global Strike Command, was activated in August 2009. The other MAJCOMs have either inactivated or lost their command status.

== Current ==
Shield	Major Command	Headquarters	Current Commander	Mission Statement
	Air Combat Command (ACC)	Langley AFB, Joint Base Langley-Eustis, Virginia, U.S.	Gen Adrian L. Spain	"ACC organizes, trains and equips combat-ready Airmen to control and exploit the air, cyberspace and the electromagnetic spectrum in support of the Joint Force."
	Air Education and Training Command (AETC)	Randolph AFB, Joint Base San Antonio, Texas, U.S.	Lt Gen Clark J. Quinn	"Find, recruit, train and educate the Airmen the nation needs."
	Air Force Global Strike Command (AFGSC)	Barksdale AFB, Louisiana, U.S.	Gen Stephen L. Davis	"Airmen ALWAYS ready to provide long-range precision strike ... anytime, anywhere!"
	Air Force Materiel Command (AFMC)	Wright-Patterson AFB, Ohio, U.S.	Lt Gen Linda S. Hurry	"Powering the world’s greatest Air Force…we deliver readiness and war-winning capabilities for today and tomorrow."
	Air Force Reserve Command (AFRC)	Robins AFB, Georgia, U.S.	Lt Gen John P. Healy	"The mission of the Air Force Reserve Command is to provide combat ready forces to fly, fight and win."
	Air Force Special Operations Command (AFSOC)	Hurlburt Field, Florida, U.S.	Lt Gen Michael E. Conley	"Raise and Retain Disciplined Professionals; Air Commandos Ready for Any Challenge."
	Air Mobility Command (AMC)	Scott AFB, Illinois, U.S.	Lt Gen Daniel Tulley	"AMC provides unrivaled airlift, air refueling, aeromedical evacuation, global air mobility support, and global command and control to project, connect, maneuver, and sustain the Joint Force (JF) in support of national objectives. Right Effects, Right Place, Right Time!"
	Pacific Air Forces (PACAF)	Hickam AFB, Joint Base Pearl Harbor Hickam, Hawaii, U.S.	Gen Kevin B. Schneider	"PACAF, in coordination with other components, allies, and partners, provides USINDOPACOM with continuous unrivaled air, space, and cyberspace capabilities to ensure regional stability and security."
	United States Air Forces in Europe – Air Forces Africa (USAFE-AFAFRICA)	Ramstein Air Base, Germany	Lt Gen Jason T. Hinds	"Protect the U.S. homeland with our Allies and partners; Project combat-ready airpower in Europe, Africa and beyond; Deter aggression and win decisively should deterrence fail."

== Historic ==
Shield	MAJCOM	Dates Active
	Alaskan Air Command	1945–1990
	Aerospace Defense Command	1946–1950; 1951–1980
	Air Force Cyber Command (Provisional)	2007–2008
	Air Force Communications Command	1961–1991
	Air Force Intelligence Command	1948–1993
	Air Force Logistics Command	1944–1992
	Air Force Space Command	1982–2019
	Air Force Systems Command	1950–1992
	Air Proving Ground Command	1946–1957 as major command
	Air Training Command	1946–1993
	Air University	1920–1993
	Bolling Field Command	1946-1958
	Caribbean Air Command	1940–1976
	Continental Air Command	1948–1968
	Electronic Security Command	1948–1993
	Headquarters Command, USAF	1946–1976
	Military Airlift Command	1966–1992
	Northeast Air Command	1950–1957
	Pacific Air Command	1946–1949
	Special Weapons Command	1949–1952
	Strategic Air Command	1946–1992
	Tactical Air Command	1946–1992
	United States Air Forces Southern Command	1940–1976
