= Youngstown–Warren Regional Airport =

Airport in Youngstown, OH

Youngstown–Warren Regional Airport (YNG)

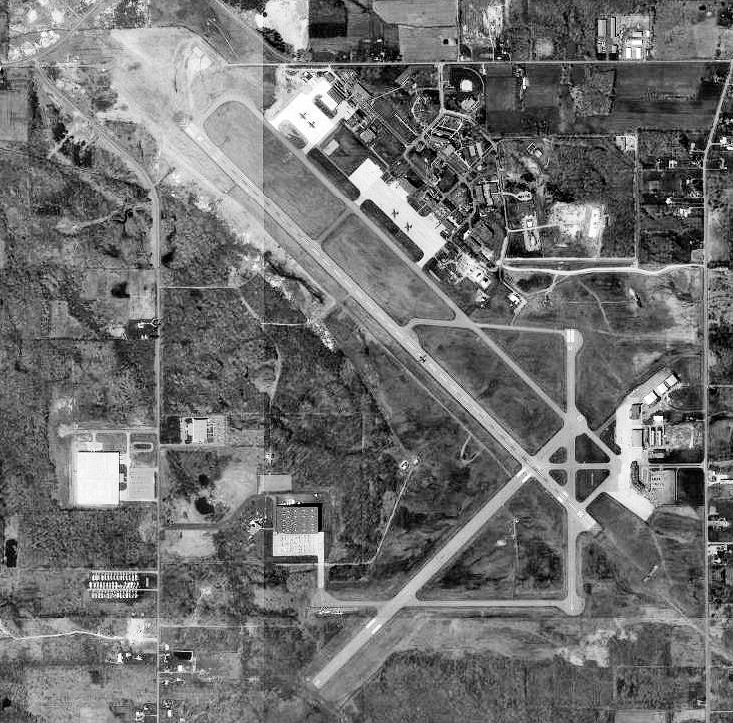
- Engineers' aerial image – 2008
- IATA: YNG; ICAO: KYNG; FAA LID: YNG

Summary
- Airport type: Public
- Owner: Western Reserve Port Authority
- Operator: Western Reserve Port Authority
- Serves: Youngstown and Warren
- Elevation AMSL: 1,196 ft (365 m)
- Coordinates: 41°15′39″N 080°40′45″W
- Website: www.yngairport.com

Maps
- Airport diagram
- Location of airport in Ohio YNG (the United States) YNG (North America) YNG (Earth)

Runways
Direction	Length		Surface
Direction	ft	m	Surface
05/23	5,002	1,525	Asphalt
14/32	9,003	2,744	Asphalt
143/323	1,196	365	Asphalt

Statistics (2019)
- Aircraft operations (year ending 9/30/2019): 25,029
- Based aircraft: 37
- Source: Federal Aviation Administration

Youngstown–Warren Regional Airport (IATA: YNG, ICAO: KYNG, FAA LID: YNG) is a public and military airport in Vienna Township, Trumbull County, Ohio, 11 miles north of Youngstown and 10 miles (16 km) east of Warren. The airport is home to the Youngstown–Warren Air Reserve Station.

The airport has been in operation for over 50 years. It is run by the Western Reserve Port Authority, made up of members appointed by the Mahoning and Trumbull County Commissioners. While there hasn't been commercial service to the airport since 2018, private jets and small charter flights continue to serve the area as of December 2023.

The airport is part of the National Plan of Integrated Airport Systems (NPIAS). In 2024, it was designated as a primary airport, allocating it an extra $1 million per year over 5 years for maintenance.

== History ==
The Youngstown–Warren Regional Airport began as the Youngstown Municipal Airport (MAP), and was one of the last Works Progress Administration projects. A groundbreaking for the project was held on 29 May 1939. The 597-acre (242 ha) airport and its 3,850-foot (1,170 m) and 3,600-foot (1,100 m) runways were dedicated on 1 July 1941. The airport is located 11 miles (18 km) north of Youngstown in Vienna Center due to limited space available within the city for the planned size. The airport that had been serving the city, Lansdowne Airport, lacked room to expand.

Construction of Youngstown Air Force Base began in June 1951, shortly before the 166th Fighter-Interceptor Squadron announced it would move from Lockbourne Air Force Base to the airport. Following a year of work, which involved lengthening the northwest-southeast runway to 7,500 feet (2,300 m), the facility was opened on 16 June 1952 and dedicated just under eight weeks later.

The city authorized the purchase of additional land for a new terminal building, parking and taxiways in August 1970. By early March 1976, the passenger terminal was considered antiquated and undersized. However, due to limited funding, a replacement was not seen as forthcoming. At the same time, a previous project to rebuild the main runway had to be redone due to heaving caused by material used in its base. The airport expressed frustration that other cities in the area benefitted from it, but did not have to provide financial support. A 11,000-square-foot (1,000 m^{2}) expansion of the terminal, along with a fifth hangar, was due to be dedicated in late September 1978.

An effort to combat unemployment from the closure of a local steel plant with federal loans in 1977, along with airline deregulation two years later, enticed a group proposing construction of a new regional airliner to the airport. In 1981, a 225,000-square-foot (20,900 m^{2}) production facility for the Commuter Aircraft Corporation was built on the west side of the airport, but the company closed down before any aircraft were built.

By late September 1993, the facility had been renamed Youngstown–Warren Regional Airport.

Plans in 1998 called for the construction of a 50,000-square-foot (4,600 m^{2}) cargo building and associated 5–10-acre (2.0–4.0 ha) ramp on the west side of the airport, a 500-acre (200 ha) industrial park west of Ridge Road and a 1,500-foot (460 m) extension to the main runway. By early November 2000, a 24,000-square-foot (2,200 m^{2}) cargo building and four new passenger gates had been built.

Northwest Airlines discontinued service to Detroit via Akron-Canton in September 2002, leaving the airport without scheduled airline service. In May 2006, Allegiant Air launched a route to Orlando/Sanford. It subsequently added flights to St. Petersburg/Clearwater and Myrtle Beach. The company ceased all of its Youngstown routes in January 2018, and the airport has lacked passenger air service. In July 2016, Aerodynamics Inc. began service to Chicago–O'Hare but that service only lasted until mid-August, less than two months after it started.

In June 2023, local city leaders filed an application with the Department of Transportation requesting a grant valued at $1.4 million (including existing aid from other sources), in order assist in returning commercial service to the airport within the next two years.

Plans for a 18,000 sq ft (1,700 m^{2}) aviation education center were announced in February 2025.

== Youngstown Air Reserve Station ==
Youngstown ARS is located at the Youngstown–Warren Regional Airport. Its primary mission is to serve as home of the 910th Airlift Wing (910 AW), an Air Force Reserve Command (AFRC) C-130J Hercules unit with two flying squadrons and a total of 16 aircraft. The 910 AW is operationally gained by the Air Mobility Command and a portion of the wing is devoted to its aerial spray mission. The 910 AW has nearly 1,450 personnel, consisting of a combination of full-time active guard and reserve, air reserve technicians, and traditional part-time drilling Air Force reservists. The installation also hosts a Navy Operational Support Center and a Marine Corps Reserve Center that is home to nearly 400 Navy and Marine Corps reservists in various units. It is also home to the Youngstown ARS Composite Squadron of the Ohio Wing of the Civil Air Patrol.

== Facilities and aircraft ==
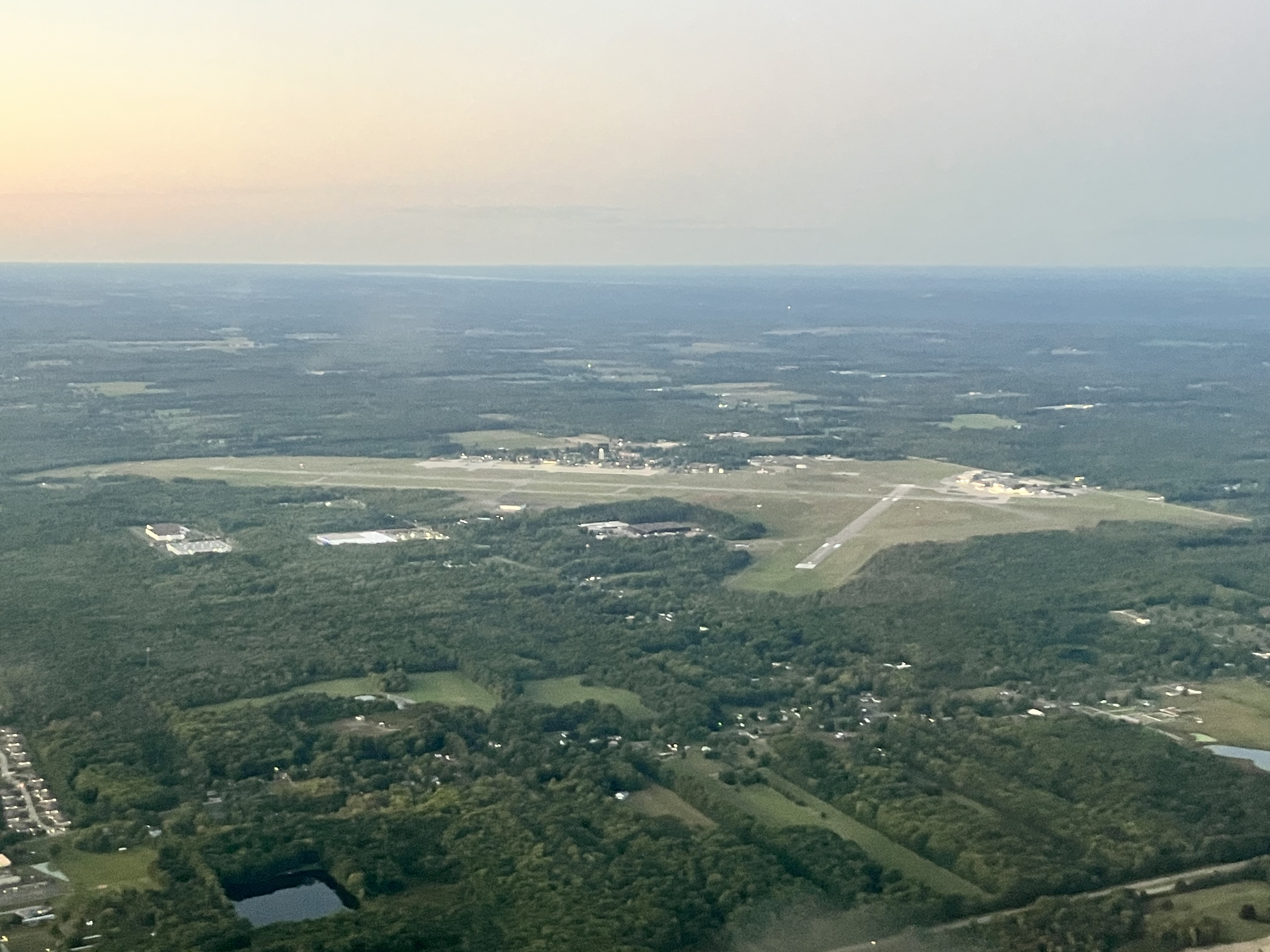
Aerial photograph of the airport

Youngstown–Warren Regional Airport covers 1,468 acres (594 ha) at an elevation of 1,196 feet (365 m) above mean sea level. It has three asphalt runways: 5/23 is 5,002 by 150 feet (1,525 x 46 m); 14/32 is 9,003 by 150 feet (2,744 x 46 m); 143/323, a military-use only runway/landing zone, is 3,501 by 60 feet (1,067 x 18 m).

The airport has a fixed base operator that sells both avgas and Jet A. Services such as catering, hangars, courtesy cars, and [rental cars are available; amenities such as internet, conference rooms, vending machines, a crew lounge, and televisions are available.

In the year ending September 30, 2019, the airport had 20,029 aircraft operations, average 69 per day: 66% general aviation, 23% military, 10% air taxi and less than 1% scheduled commercial. 37 aircraft were then based at this airport: 20 single-engine, 2 multi-engine, 7 jet and 8 military.

The former long-term parking lot is currently being used as a training location for a tractor-trailer driving school.

The Youngstown Branch Campus of the Pittsburgh Institute of Aeronautics is located at the airport.

== Passenger terminal ==
The Youngstown Warren Regional Airport terminal building sits on the southeast end of the airport.

In 2000, the Youngstown Airport renovated and expanded the boarding area. The new gate area consists of six gates (two jetways and four ground-loading gates), and can accommodate aircraft ranging up to the size of a Boeing 757. The airport is equipped to handle up to 250,000 passengers a year in the current configuration and can seat up to 400 passengers at any given time.

The airport currently has four ticket counters, one baggage claim and on-site capacity for up to five rental car companies. The airport's only on-site restaurant, Mikees II, closed shortly after Allegiant Air ceased all remaining operations to the airport in 2018. The airport offers a recently expanded parking facility with the lowest cost of parking in the area.

The airport's master plan calls for an expanded terminal to add another three gates, should air service return and spike at any time.

== Statistics ==
Top scheduled destinations (November 2016 - October 2017)
Rank	Airport	Passengers	Airline
1	St. Petersburg/Clearwater, Florida	16,000	Allegiant
2	Orlando/Sanford, Florida	13,000	Allegiant
3	Myrtle Beach, South Carolina	4,000	Allegiant

== Passenger traffic ==
Year	Total passengers
2005	13,868
2006	24,958
2007	35,144
2008	35,674
2009	34,782
2010	55,434
2011	74,096
2012	80,204
2013	95,500
2014	120,000
2015	129,000
2016	100,000
2017	60,000 (estimated)
2018	6,000 (estimated)

== Ground transportation ==
Youngstown Airport has a number of taxicab and shuttle services. Though the Youngstown/Warren area has fixed route bus services, no route serves the airport.

Avis Car Rental and Budget Rent a Car offer rental vehicles from the airport.

== Accidents and incidents ==
- On May 3, 2007, a Cessna 210 was substantially damaged following a loss of engine power while on final approach to Youngstown–Warren Regional Airport. The airplane impacted terrain about one-half mile from the approach end of runway 5. The pilot was conducting a visual approach to runway 5 when he experienced an engine failure 2–3 miles from the airport. Despite completing the appropriate memory items, he could not get the engine to restart; as he was unable to make the runway, he aimed for a landing on the least congested area adjacent to a road. Fuel was found in the fuel tanks after the accident, the fuel selector on, and the mixture control functional; all components of the engine were found to be operative. The cause of the engine failure, therefore, could not be determined.
- On July 19, 2024, a Beechcraft Duke crashed while attempting an emergency landing at the Youngstown–Warren Regional Airport, where it had a fuel stop planned. All three aboard were killed. The pilot reported he had lost his left engine and couldn't maintain altitude. Witnesses report the aircraft was higher than normal on approach and didn't touch down while it was over the runway; instead, it pitched up quickly and began to flip in a descending left turn before crashing. The cause of the crash was determined to be the pilot's loss of airplane control during a single-engine go-around. Another contributing factor was fuel system contamination, which had resulted in detonation and a total loss of left-engine power.
- On June 29, 2025, a Cessna 441 crashed after departing the Youngstown–Warren Regional Airport. The aircraft crashed two miles west of the airport minutes after departure. The two pilots and four passengers onboard were killed. The crash is under investigation.

== See also ==
- Lansdowne Airport
- List of airports in Ohio
- Salem Airpark
- Youngstown Elser Metro Airport
- Youngstown Executive Airport
