= 79th Medical Wing =

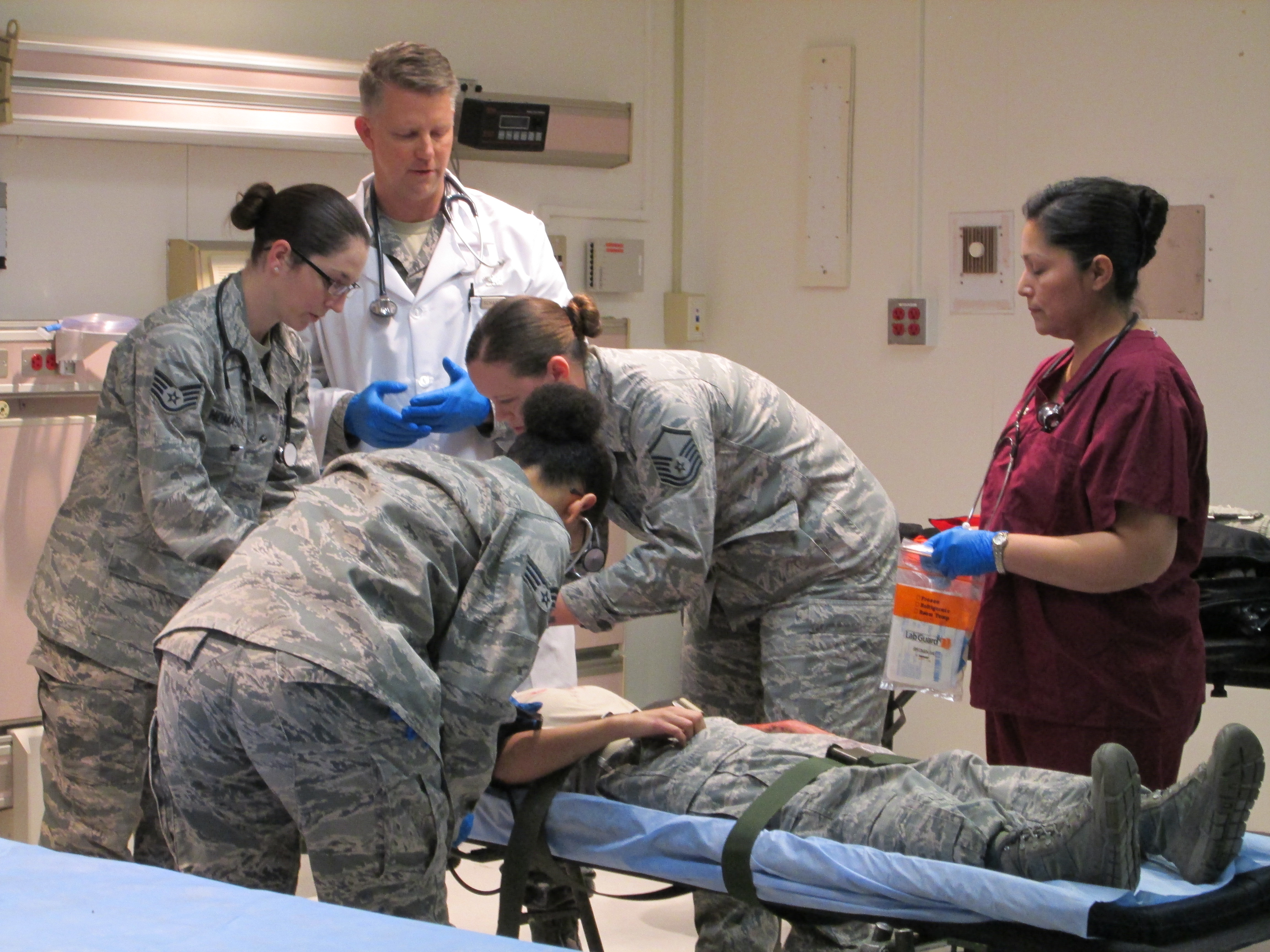
- Members of the 79th Medical Wing care for a simulated trauma victim during training at Joint Base Andrews
- Active: 1955-1960; 2006–2017; 2025–present
- Country: United States
- Branch: United States Air Force
- Role: Medical care
- Part of: Air Force Medical Command
- Garrison/HQ: Joint Base Andrews Naval Air Facility
- Decorations: Air Force Outstanding Unit Award
- Website: www.79MDW.af.mil

Commanders
- Chief Master Sergeant Lisa Thrasher-Stallard: Colonel Jeffrey S. Fewell

Insignia
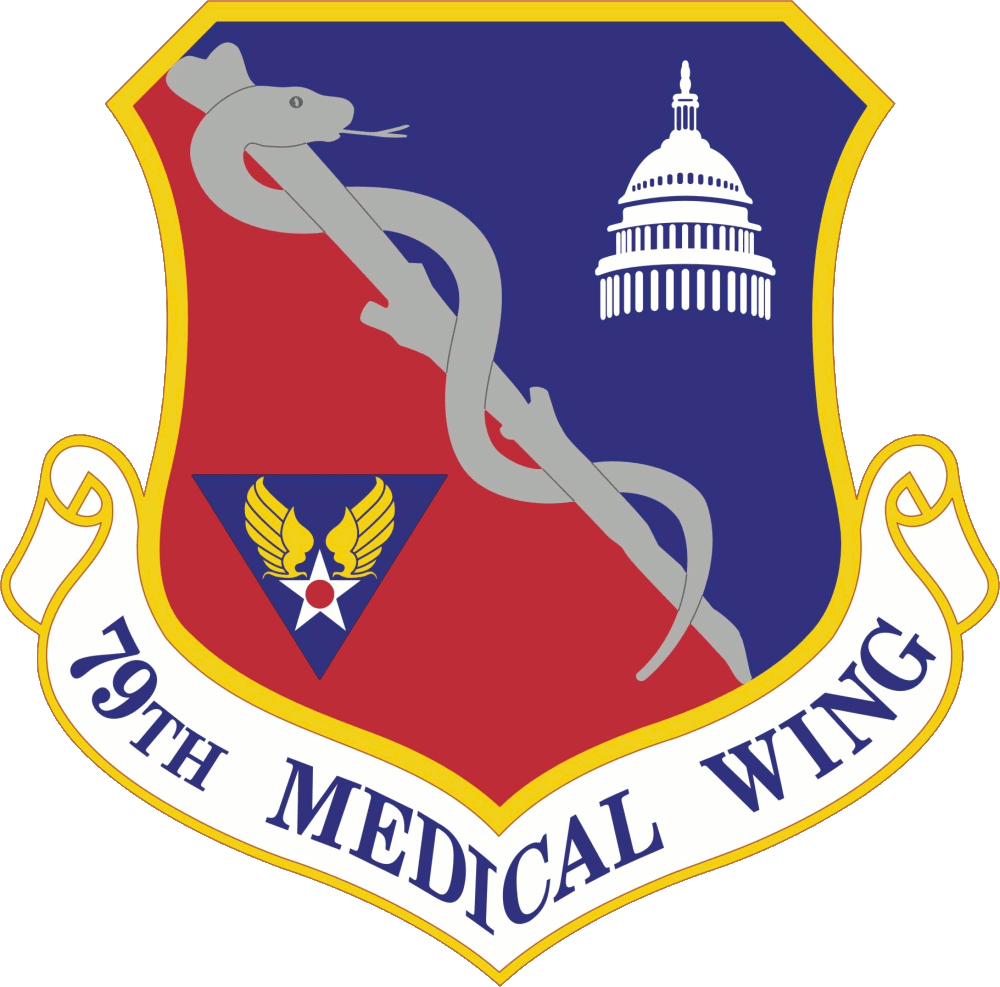
- 79th Medical Wing emblem (approved 21 November 2006.)

The 79th Medical Wing is a wing of the United States Air Force. It is located in the Defense Health Headquarters building in Falls Church, VA, where it was activated again in March 2025. From 2006 to 2017, the wing was the Air Force's agent for Air Force and joint medicine within the National Capital Region. Activated on 10 May 2006, it was the largest wing within the Air Force District of Washington, and one of two medical wings in the Air Force. The wing was originally active as an infirmary at Youngstown Municipal Airport between 1955 and 1960.

While headquartered at Andrews AFB from 2006-2016, the 79th Medical Wing organized, trained, equipped, and provided medicine for Air and Space Expeditionary Force deployment, CONUS operations, and in support of joint operations within the National Capital Region. It was the East Coast hub for aeromedical evacuation aircraft returning sick or injured patients from the Atlantic area. The wing was also responsible for providing medical support to Presidential, Congressional, Joint and Air Staff special airlift missions.

== Air Defense Command 1955-1960 ==
The wing was first organized in August 1955 as the 79th USAF Infirmary at Youngstown Municipal Airport when the 79th Fighter Group was activated to replace the 502d Air Defense Group as part of Air Defense Command's Project Arrow, a program to restore fighter units that had compiled memorable records in the two world wars. The unit absorbed the personnel and equipment of the 502d USAF Infirmary.

In May 1957, the unit became the 79th USAF Dispensary, when the Air Force renamed its small medical units. The dispensary was discontinued along with the 79th Group in March 1960, when the ADC turned its facilities at Youngstown over to Continental Air Command for use as a reserve station.

== Predecessors at Andrews ==
Medical operations at Joint Base Andrews started as a medical detachment consisting of one officer (Capt. Isadore L. Epstein) and 11 enlisted men, who reported to Camp Springs Army Air Field and set up a dispensary. The dispensary had an eight-bed ward, two private rooms, a pharmacy, a dental clinic with two chairs, an X-ray machine, a kitchenette, and offices. Five ambulances were available and Walter Reed General Hospital and Bolling Field Station Hospital were used for consultation and emergencies.

Named after Maj. Gen. (Dr.) Malcolm C. Grow in 1962, the Medical center at Andrews was dedicated to a man who served as a field doctor in both world wars, in 1949 was selected at the first Air Force surgeon general, and was active in military medicine until his death in 1960.

Originally named the USAF Hospital Andrews, construction began in June 1955 and was completed in May 1958 to the tune of $5.5 million. Staffed by Bolling and Andrews personnel, it opened 4 August 1958 and provided care to more than 75,000 military personnel and their families in the area. The 79th USAF Dispensary was redesignated the 79th Medical Wing and activated to manage the hospital in May 2006.

In 2017, more than 600,000 eligible Department of Defense beneficiaries were in the National Capital Region. On a typical day in patient care, Malcolm Grow Medical Clinics and Surgery Center doctors and other healthcare workers see 930 outpatients, 90 dental patients, and 72 emergency care patients, and conduct seven surgical procedures, take care of 30 patients transitioning at the Aeromedical Staging Facility, and fill 1,963 pharmacy prescriptions. The wing was inactivated in June 2017, and facility management was transferred to the 11th Medical Group, which was simultaneously activated.

As the Air Force began realigning its medical units to assign them to Air Force Medical Command, it reactivated the wing in March 2025 to command all 14 medical facilities in the Air Force District of Washington and Air Combat Command MAJCOMs.

== Lineage ==
- Constituted as the 79th USAF Infirmary on 20 June 1955

Activated on 18 August 1955
Redesignated 79th USAF Dispensary on 8 May 1957
Discontinued on 1 March 1960

- Redesignated 79th Medical Wing on 5 May 2006

Activated on 10 May 2006
Inactivated June 2017
Activated c. 17 March 2025

=== Assignments ===
- 79th Fighter Group, 18 August 1955 – 1 March 1960
- Air Force District of Washington, 10 May 2006 – June 2017
- Air Force Medical Command, Medical Readiness Command - Bravo, 17 March 2025 – present

=== Components ===
- 79th Medical Group, 5 May 2006 – 1 October 2008
- 579th Medical Group, 10 May 2006 – June 2017
- 779th Medical Group, 1 October 2008 – June 2017

=== Stations ===
- Youngstown Municipal Airport, Ohio 18 August 1955 – 1 March 1960
- Andrews Air Force Base (later part of Joint Base Andrews), Maryland, 10 May 2006 – June 2017
- Defense Health Headquarters, Falls Church, VA 17 March 2025 – present
