= Mathews Local School District =

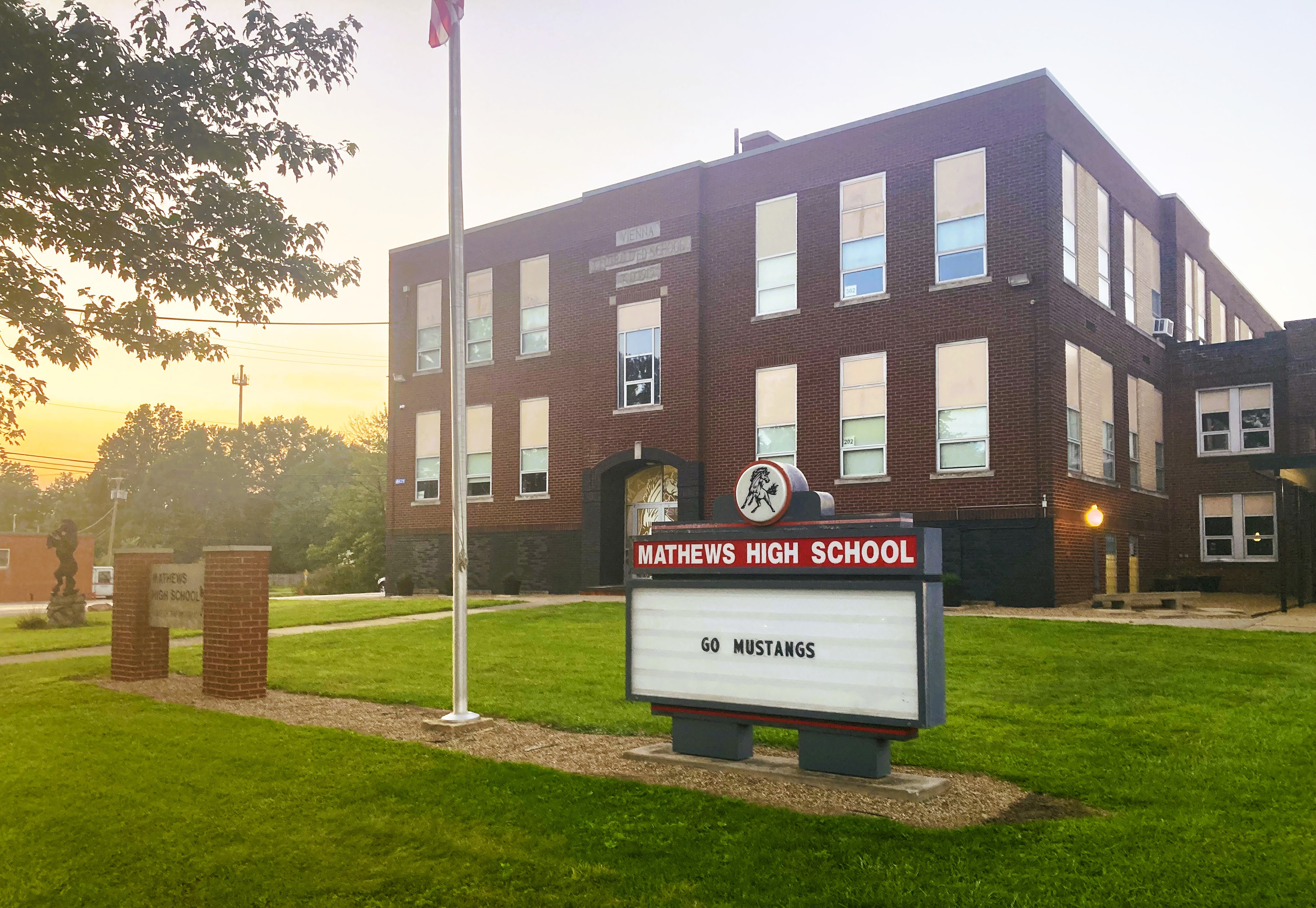
- Mathews High School located on Warren-Sharon Road in Vienna

Location
- 4096 Cadwallader Sonk Rd; Cortland, Ohio; United States

Information
- Type: Public
- Opened: 1961
- NCES District ID: 3905015
- Teaching staff: 45.39 (FTE)
- Grades: PK-12
- Enrollment: 581 (2024-2025)
- Student to teacher ratio: 8.27
- Colors: Red and Black
- Nickname: Mustangs
- Website: Mathews Local School District

The Mathews Local School District is a school district located in Vienna Township, Trumbull County, Ohio, United States. The school district serves one high school, one junior high school and two elementary schools. The school district office is located at 4096 Cadwallader Sonk Rd Cortland OH, 44410.

== History ==
Mathews Local School District was formed in 1961, following the consolidation of Vienna Centralized School, which opened in 1915, and Fowler Township School. In 1983, the school district was renamed from Fowler-Vienna Local School District to Mathews Local School District.

in 1995, a fire broke out on the 3rd floor of the high school, causing $1,000,000 in damages ($2.1-2.13 million today), the entire 3rd floor of the building was renovated, with new computers, textbooks, walls, floors, doors, etc.

This high school campus now houses students grades 6–12 as of 2022, following the closures of Neal Middle School in 2011. and Baker School in 2022. Currie Elementary School was closed following the 2023–24 school year, and its K-5 students are now housed at Baker School.

On January 17, 2014, the floor of the Vienna Memorial Auditorium was renamed "Rex Leach Court" after Rex Leach, the all-star player for the former Vienna Flyers, who actively holds numerous state records.

== Schools ==
=== High School ===
- Mathews High School

=== Middle School ===
- Mathews Junior High School

=== Elementary School ===
- Mathews Elementary School (Intermediate)
- Mathews Elementary School (Primary)

=== Former Schools ===
- Currie Elementary School
- Neal Middle School
- Baker Elementary School
