= Structure of the United States Air Force =

Organizational hierarchy of the U.S. Air Force

The structure of the United States Air Force refers to the unit designators and organizational hierarchy of the United States Air Force, which starts at the most senior commands.

The senior headquarters of the Department of the Air Force (DAF) consists of distinct staffs in the Pentagon: the Secretariat or SAF Staff and the Headquarters Air Force or HAF Staff. The Secretariat is headed by the Secretary of the Air Force (SECAF) and HAF Staff is led by the Chief of Staff of the Air Force (CSAF). Headquarters DAF also includes the Space Staff, which parallels the HAF Staff but governs the United States Space Force.

== Organizational types ==
=== Direct Reporting Unit ===
A Direct Reporting Unit (DRU) is an agency of the United States Department of the Air Force that is outside the bounds of the standard organizational hierarchy by being exclusively and uniquely under the control of Air Force headquarters alone, rather than reporting through a major command. The term "direct reporting unit" comes from the fact that the unit reports directly to the chief of staff of the Air Force or to a designated representative on the Air Staff.

A DRU has a specialized and restricted mission, meaning that it is a single purpose unit, usually to the exclusion of other duties, reporting to Air Force Air Staff alone. It is separate and independent from any organization structure or supervision: major command, numbered air force, operational command, division, wing, group, squadron, or field operating agency. It is a DRU because the unit's specific and focused duties, legal issues that necessitate the unit's independence, or other factors such as national security concerns.

The Air Force has a very limited number of direct reporting units:

DRU	Location
Air Force District of Washington (AFDW)	Joint Base Andrews Naval Air Facility, Maryland
Air Force Medical Command	Falls Church, Virginia
Air Force Operational Test and Evaluation Center (AFOTEC)	Kirtland Air Force Base, New Mexico
United States Air Force Academy (USAFA)	United States Air Force Academy, Colorado

=== Field operating agency ===
The field operating agency (FOA) is a subdivision of the Air Force, directly subordinate to an HQ USAF functional manager. A FOA performs field activities beyond the scope of any of the major commands. The activities are specialized or associated with an Air Force-wide mission, and do not include functions performed in management headquarters, unless specifically directed by a DoD authority.

=== Major Command (MAJCOM) ===
A major subdivision of the Air Force, the major command (MAJCOM) is directly subordinate to HQ USAF or the Air Staff. MAJCOM headquarters are management headquarters for a major segment of the AF and thus have the full range of functional staff. MAJCOMs are commanded by a general (O-10).

=== Numbered Air Force (NAF) ===
The numbered air force (NAF) is a tactical echelon directly under an operational MAJCOM that provide operational leadership and supervision. NAFs are structured to perform an operational or warfighting mission, often oriented to a specific geographic region. A NAF is directly assigned operational units, such as wings, groups, and squadrons. NAFs are commanded by either a major general (O-8) or lieutenant general (O-9).

=== Wing ===
Wings have a distinct mission with a specific scope, reporting to the NAF or HQ USAF. Wings are made up of one or more groups, consisting of several squadrons, and usually commanded by a colonel (O-6), but high visibility wings can have a brigadier general (O-7) in command. Second in command to the Wing Commander is the Deputy Wing Commander who is and only can be a colonel. The senior enlisted personnel of a wing can be known as the Command Chief who holds the rank of command chief master sergeant (E-9). Wings now encompass both operations and support activities (maintenance groups, mission support groups), and are usually one of three major types: operational wing, air base wing, and specialized mission wing. As of 2024 the USAF excluding the Air National Guard has 119 wings.

=== Group ===
Made up of several squadrons and typically commanded by a colonel (O-6). Second in command to the group commander is the deputy group commander, who is also a colonel or lieutenant colonel (O-5); in some cases, this role may be performed by a designated civilian, typically at the GS-15 level, with the alternative title of deputy group director. The senior enlisted member of a group is known as the group senior enlisted leader (formerly group superintendent). This position can only be held by a chief master sergeant (E-9). The group was of less visibility for some decades but came back to prominence during a transition to the "objective wing" organization in the 1990s. This reorganization changed the base command structure from the "wing commander/base commander" scheme to a single wing commander ("one base-one boss") with multiple groups under his command. There are two general types of groups: dependent (operations, logistics, support, medical, or large functional unit); and independent (a group with wing-like functions and responsibilities whose scope and size does not warrant wing-level designation). As of 30 September 2006, USAF had 17 independent groups, nine of them flying establishments.

=== Squadron ===
The squadron is considered to be the basic unit within the USAF and exists to "[provide] a specific operational or support capability." Squadrons are usually composed of two to six flights and contain from 35 to 700 people, depending upon the type. (An operational, or "flying," squadron will typically contain aircrew, organized in three or four flights, sufficient to man from eight to 24 aircraft, dependent upon the type/model/series of aircraft operated. The aircraft are "owned" by the squadron's parent wing's maintenance group, while the operational squadrons and their aircrews belong to the wing's operations group.)

A squadron is usually commanded by a major (O-4) or lieutenant colonel (O-5); however lieutenant colonel is the most common rank for the squadron commander (SQ/CC) of most types of squadrons. Alternatively, a small number of squadrons are headed by civilian commander-equivalents, known as squadron directors (abbreviated as SQ/CL for civilian leader) - typically at the GS-15 pay grade.

Second in command of a squadron is typically a squadron operations officer or director of operations (DO), who is usually a senior-ranking major (O-4). The DO may be assisted by one or two assistant operations officers, who are normally majors or senior-ranking captains (O-3).

In addition to flight subdivisions, the squadron may feature a number of "administrative" supporting elements that report directly to the commander. These may include a "command support staff" (CSS) that handles personnel records and manpower management; a "secretary" (often civilian employee) or "executive officer" directly assigned to the SQ/CC; as well as "safety" and "standardization/evaluation" functional areas.

Air Force squadrons also include enlisted senior non-commissioned officer (SNCO) leadership to advise and support the commander. The SQ/CC is assisted by a chief master sergeant (E-9) "senior enlisted leader" that handles enlisted programs and manpower within the squadron; as well as a "first sergeant" (i.e., a specially selected and trained master, senior, or chief master sergeant in pay grades "E-7," "E-8," or "E-9," respectively) that serves as "a dedicated focal point for all readiness, health, morale, welfare, and quality of life issues within their organizations."

=== Flight ===
A flight is a subdivision of the squadron. Flights range from a dozen people to over a hundred; or typically four aircraft. A flight may be either a "Numbered or Named Flight" (lowest-level recognized unit, such as "Operations Flight"), "alpha" flight (part of a squadron composed of elements performing identical missions), or a "Functional Flight" (element performing specific missions, such as a "Manpower and Organization Flight").

The flight commander, also referred to as an "Officer-In-Charge" (OIC), is a company-grade officer (CGO) typically at the rank of captain (O-3). The OIC is assisted by a senior non-commissioned officer (SNCO), typically at the rank of senior master sergeant (E-8). Unlike squadrons, flight commanders are not on "G-Series Orders" and do not hold the same command authorities as the squadron.

The primary bulk of manpower and mission accomplishment within a squadron is located within the flights of the squadron. Most flights are broken into subdivisions known as sections and elements. While these subdivisions are not normally recognized by official Air Force reporting functions, they are typically recognized by their wing. These subdivisions exist to clump together specific missions or capabilities and serve to identify their purpose to the installation.

=== Section ===
A section is an internal subdivision of a flight. It is typically staffed by a non-commissioned or senior non-commissioned officer (SNCO), typically at the rank of master sergeant (E-7); who is referred to as a "Section Chief." Some sections may also be under the command of an "Officer-In-Charge" (OIC), typically a company-grade-officer (CGO) at the rank of second lieutenant (O-1) or first lieutenant (O-2). Examples of sections include "Outbound Assignments" within the "Military Personnel Flight" of the "Force Support Squadron" and the "Avionics Intermediate Section" (AIS) within the "Avionics Flight" of the "Maintenance Squadron."

Some sections may be further subdivided into multiple elements, often referred to as "workcenters". Such elements are typically staffed by a "Non-Commissioned Officer In Charge" (NCOIC); typically at the rank of technical sergeant (E-6). One such example is the division of "Infrastructure" and "Technical Control Facility" workcenters within the "Infrastructure Section" of the "Operations Flight" of a "Communications Squadron."

== Historical organizations ==
=== Separate operating agency ===
(not in current use)

Separate operating agencies (SOA) were major Air Force subdivisions directly subordinate to HQ USAF and has all the "procedural (administrative and logistical) responsibilities" of a MAJCOM. In 1991, most active SOAs changed in status to DRUs or FOAs.

=== Air division ===
Air divisions have existed since World War II when many of the Numbered Air Divisions began as wings. There were both named and numbered divisions, mostly air divisions. Recently HQ USAF gradually inactivated or redesignated divisions in an effort to encourage rapid decision-making and to create a more flat organizational structure without "middle management" units, and as such air divisions are rarely used.

== Reserve components and auxiliary ==
=== Air National Guard ===
The Air National Guard, often referred to as the Air Guard, is the air force militia organized by each of the fifty U.S. states, the commonwealth of Puerto Rico, the territories of Guam and the U.S. Virgin Islands, and the District of Columbia of the United States. Established under Title 10 and Title 32 of the U.S. Code, the Air National Guard is part of a state's National Guard and is divided up into units stationed in each of the 50 states and U.S. territories and operates under their respective state governor or territorial government. The Air National Guard may be called up for active duty by the state governors or territorial commanding generals to help respond to domestic emergencies and disasters, such as those caused by hurricanes, floods, and earthquakes.

With the consent of state governors, members or units of the Air National Guard may be appointed, temporarily or indefinitely, to be federally recognized members of the armed forces, in the active or inactive service of the United States. If federally recognized, the member or unit becomes part of the Air National Guard of the United States, which is one of two reserve components of the United States Air Force, and part of the National Guard of the United States. Air National Guard of the United States units or members may be called up for federal active duty in times of congressionally sanctioned war or national emergency.

=== United States Air Force Reserve ===
CONUS based AFRC units are assigned to AFRC. This assignment governs command relationships within the Air Force chain of command. 10 USC § 10174 states:

(a) Establishment of Command.— The Secretary of the Air Force, with the advice and assistance of the Chief of Staff of the Air Force, shall establish an Air Force Reserve Command. The Air Force Reserve Command shall be operated as a separate command of the Air Force.

(b) Commander.— The Chief of Air Force Reserve is the Commander of the Air Force Reserve Command. The commander of the Air Force Reserve Command reports directly to the Chief of Staff of the Air Force.

(c) Assignment of Forces.— The Secretary of the Air Force—

(1) shall assign to the Air Force Reserve Command all forces of the Air Force Reserve stationed in the continental United States other than forces assigned to the unified combatant command for special operations forces established pursuant to section 167 of this title; and

(2) except as otherwise directed by the Secretary of Defense in the case of forces assigned to carry out functions of the Secretary of the Air Force specified in section 8013 of this title, shall assign to the combatant commands all such forces assigned to the Air Force Reserve Command under paragraph (1) in the manner specified by the Secretary of Defense.

=== Civil Air Patrol ===
Civil Air Patrol (CAP) is a congressionally chartered, federally supported, non-profit corporation that serves as the official auxiliary of the USAF. It performs three congressionally assigned key missions: emergency services, which includes search and rescue (by air and ground) and disaster relief operations; aerospace education for youth and the general public; and cadet programs for teenage youth. In addition, CAP has recently been tasked with homeland security and courier service missions. CAP also performs non-auxiliary missions for various governmental and private agencies, such as local law enforcement and the American Red Cross. The program is established as an organization by Title 10 of the United States Code and its purposes defined by Title 36. When conducting missions for the Air Force as the official Air Force auxiliary, CAP is now included in the Air Force's definition of the total force.

== Other generic designations ==
In addition to the aforementioned unit structures, the USAF has used, and still uses, a variety of other designations to identify organizations. These organization designations include:

- Academy
- Agency
- Area
- Band
- Battlelab
- Branch
- Center
- Central
- Clinic
- College
- Crew
- Depository
- Depot
- Detachment
- Directorate
- Dispensary
- Division
- District
- Element
- Facility
- Fire team
- Hospital
- Infirmary
- Institute
- Laboratory
- Library
- Museum
- Office
- Operating Location
- Organization
- Plant
- Range
- Region
- School
- Section
- Sector
- Squad
- Staff
- System
- Team
- Unit
- University
