= Youngstown Air Reserve Station =

Military facility in Ohio, US

- Near Warren, Ohio in the United States
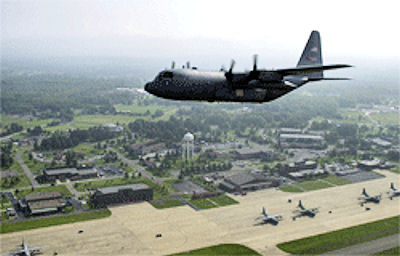
- A C-130H Hercules assigned to the 910th Airlift Wing above Youngstown ARS

Site information
- Type: Air Reserve Station
- Owner: Department of Defense
- Operator: U.S. Air Force (USAF)
- Controlled by: Air Force Reserve Command (AFRC)
- Condition: Operational
- Website: www.youngstown.afrc.af.mil

Location
- Location in the United States
- Coordinates: 41°15′38.64″N 80°40′44.74″W

Site history
- Built: 1951
- In use: 1951 – present

Garrison information
- Garrison: 910th Airlift Wing (host)

Airfield information
- Identifiers: IATA: YNG, ICAO: KYNG, FAA LID: YNG, WMO: 725250
- Elevation: 1,196 ft (365 m) AMSL
Runways
Direction	Length and surface
14/32	5,002 ft (1,525 m) Asphalt
5/23	1,525 ft (465 m) Asphalt
143/323	1,196 ft (365 m) Asphalt
- Airfield shared with Youngstown–Warren Regional Airport; Source: Federal Aviation Administration

Youngstown Air Reserve Station (sometimes abbreviated as YARS) (IATA: YNG, ICAO: KYNG) is a military facility located in Vienna Township, Trumbull County, Ohio, 11 miles north of Youngstown and 10 miles east of Warren in the United States. The installation is located at Youngstown–Warren Regional Airport. The host wing for the installation is the 910th Airlift Wing (910 AW), an Air Force Reserve Command unit operationally gained by the Air Mobility Command.

== Mission ==
Youngstown ARS is located at the Youngstown–Warren Regional Airport. Its primary mission is to serve as home of the 910 AW and its eight C-130J Hercules aircraft, operated by one C-130 squadron. The 910 AW is a unique organization in the U.S. Air Force Reserve in that a portion of the wing's mission is devoted to the Department of Defense's only fixed-wing aerial spray mission.

== Staffing ==
The 910 AW has nearly 1,450 military personnel – around 300 air reserve technician (ART) personnel, augmented by roughly 1,150 "traditional" part-time Air Force reservists - and 150 full-time civilians. The installation also hosts a Navy Operational Support Center and a collocated Marine Corps Reserve Center that are home to Navy and Marine Corps reservists.

As Youngstown–Warren ARS, the installation has 59 operational buildings, primarily aviation maintenance, training, and administrative facilities. While it has dormitories for temporary lodging, no permanent housing is available on the installation.

The current host wing, the 910 AW, traces its lineage at Youngstown to 1963, when it was established as the 910th Troop Carrier Group flying the C-119 Flying Boxcar. The group later trained as a forward air control/tactical air support group from 1970 to 1971, as an air support special operations group from 1971 to 1973, and as a fighter group from 1973 to 1981, during which time it operated the A-37 Dragonfly and U-3 Blue Canoe and was operationally gained by the TAC. It converted to an airlift mission in 1981 and received its first C-130 aircraft on 27 March 1981, when it became the 910th Tactical Airlift Group and operationally gained by the Military Airlift Command (MAC).

== History ==
=== 1950s ===
The history of Youngstown ARS dates to the early 1950s, when it was originally opened as Youngstown Air Force Base. Beginning in 1951, the Air Defense Command (ADC) began negotiations with the local community to construct an Air Force base to defend the north-central United States. Negotiations were finalized and the new base was dedicated on 11 August 1952.

The housekeeping unit of the new $10 million air defense base was the 88th Air Base Squadron, with ADC's 86th Fighter-Interceptor Squadron being the operational unit flying F-84C Thunderjets. Assigned to ADC's Central Air Defense Force, the 86th would remain at Youngstown until 1960, eventually upgrading to the F-102 Delta Dagger. On 18 August 1955, the 30th Air Division, 79th Fighter Group (Air Defense) was assigned to Youngstown AFB.

On 26 May 1952, the Air Force Reserve's 26th Fighter-Bomber Squadron was assigned to Youngstown. Formerly a troop carrier squadron, the unit had been activated during the Korean War, and after being inactivated, was assigned to Youngstown as a reserve T-33 Shooting Star squadron. The 26th FBS received F-86H Sabres in 1958, but shortly afterward was inactivated and redesignated as the 757th Troop Carrier Squadron. The F-86s had been received, but never flown while they were going through acceptance checks, and the T-33s, which were flying, were taken out and replaced by C-119 Flying Boxcars

In 1959, the need for active-duty Air Defense Command bases and regular Air Force fighter-interceptor operations were diminishing and the intent to scale back operations at Youngstown AFB was announced on 28 October 1959. The Air Force transferred command of Youngstown AFB to Continental Air Command (now the Air Force Reserve Command) on 1 March 1960 and the 79th Fighter Group was inactivated that date.

=== 1990s ===
In January 1992, the 910 TAG became the only full-time, fixed-wing aerial spray unit in the Department of Defense. In June of that year, as part of an Air Force-wide reorganization, MAC was disestablished and the unit was renamed the 910th Airlift Group, operationally-gained by the newly established Air Mobility Command (AMC).

In 1997, the Air Force Reserve became a separate major command in the Air Force organizational structure as Air Force Reserve Command (AFRC). Per AFRC direction, the unit was renamed the 910th Airlift Wing (910 AW) while still retaining its operational relationship with AMC.

=== 2020s ===
In 2022, the U.S. Air Force selected the facility as the next to receive a fleet of C-130Js. In addition to significant performance advantages, the aircraft reduces manpower requirements, lowers operating and support costs, and offers life-cycle cost savings over earlier models.

That same year, the U.S. Federal Government allocated nearly $9 million to the base to construct a tactical landing zone to help train soldiers before they experience the real thing in battle.

In 2023, state senators voted to restore a $3 million allocation to the facility as a 10% match to federal aid. Money went towards resurfacing the main runway and taxiway.

In 2024, construction began on a new main gate complex for the base's entrance. The new gate will feature facilities and technology to enhance force protection and anti-terrorism capabilities for the station. At the same time, work started on an Air Heritage Trail nearby.

== See also ==
- Aerospace Defense Command Fighter Squadrons
