= Northeast Ohio =

Place in Ohio, United States

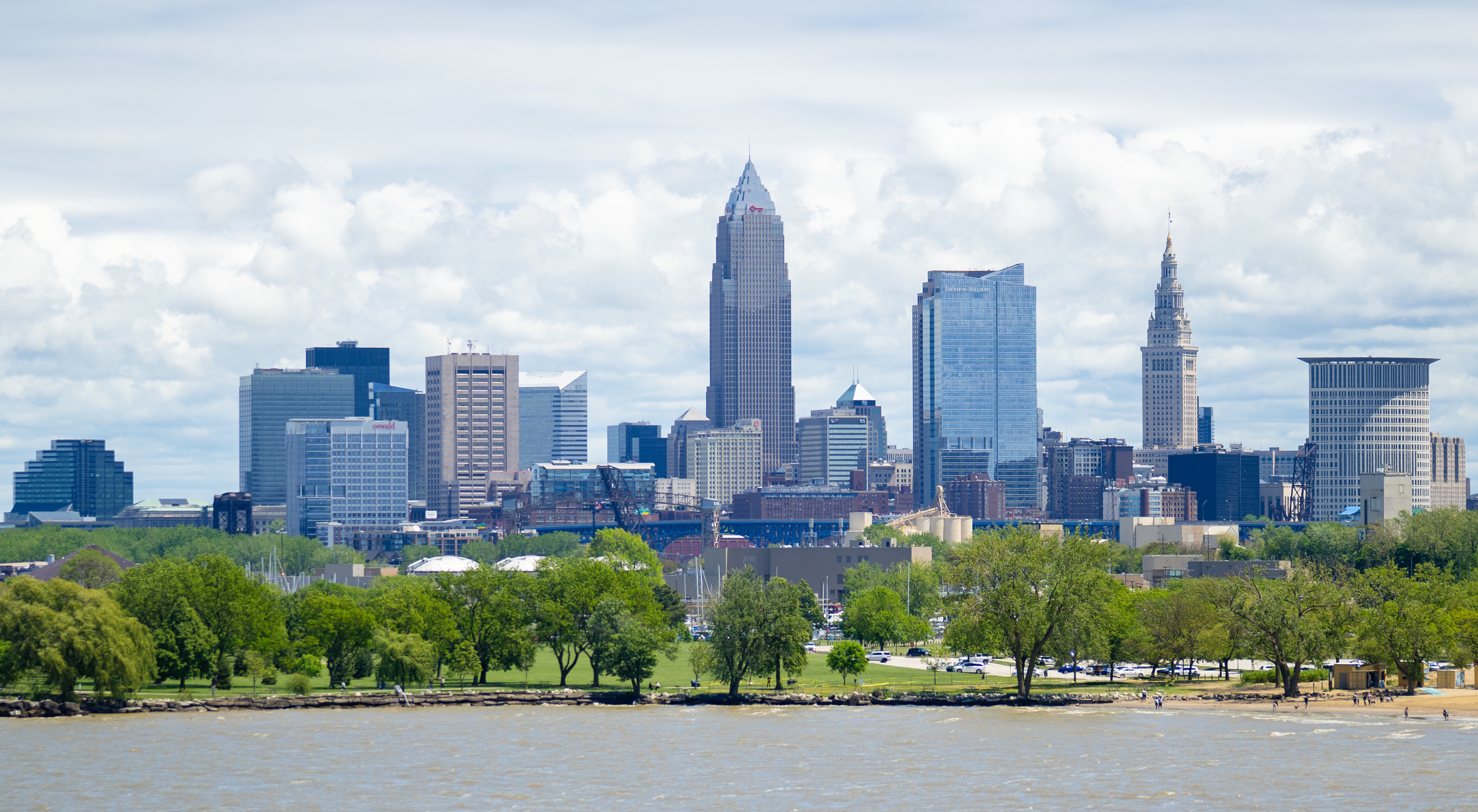
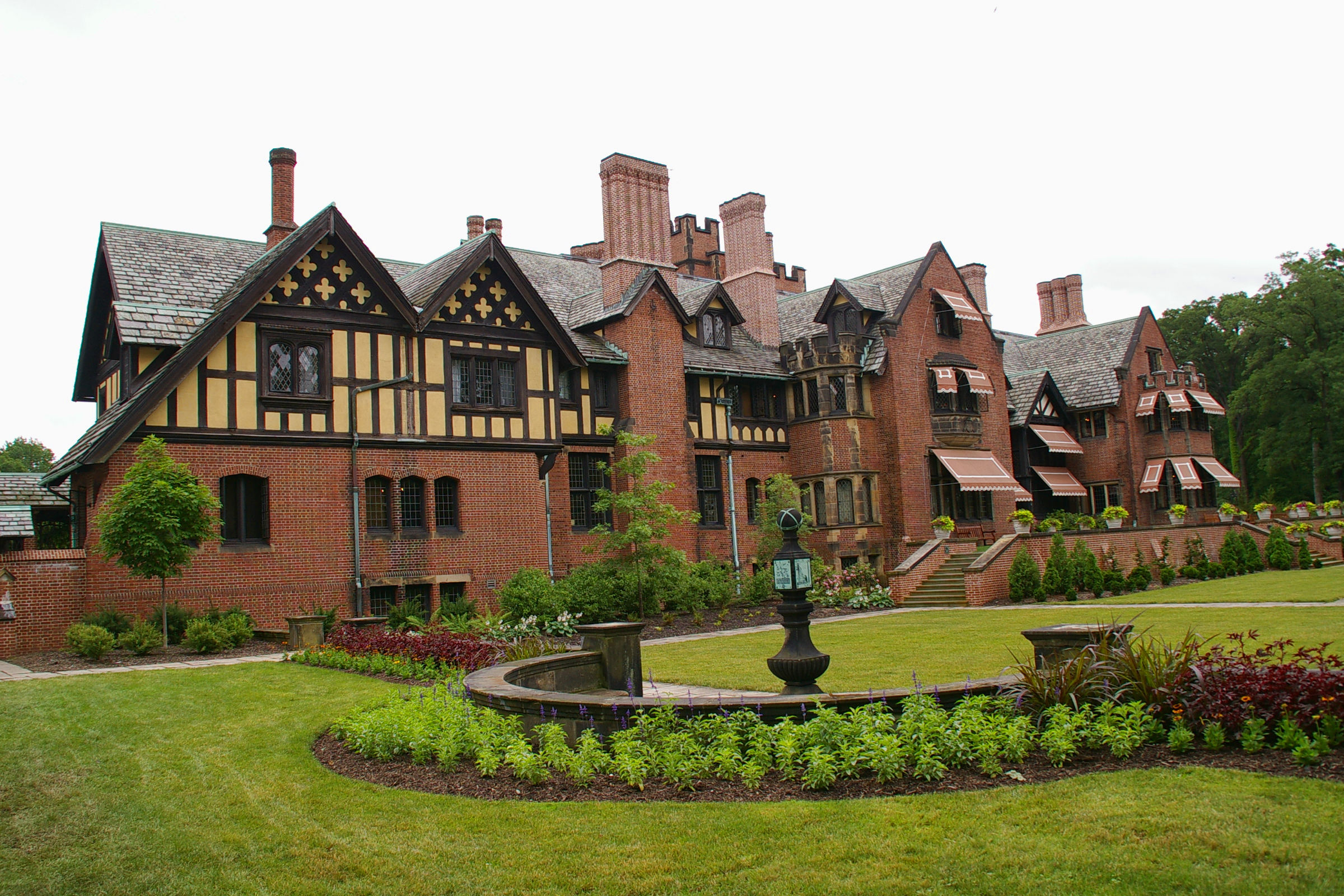
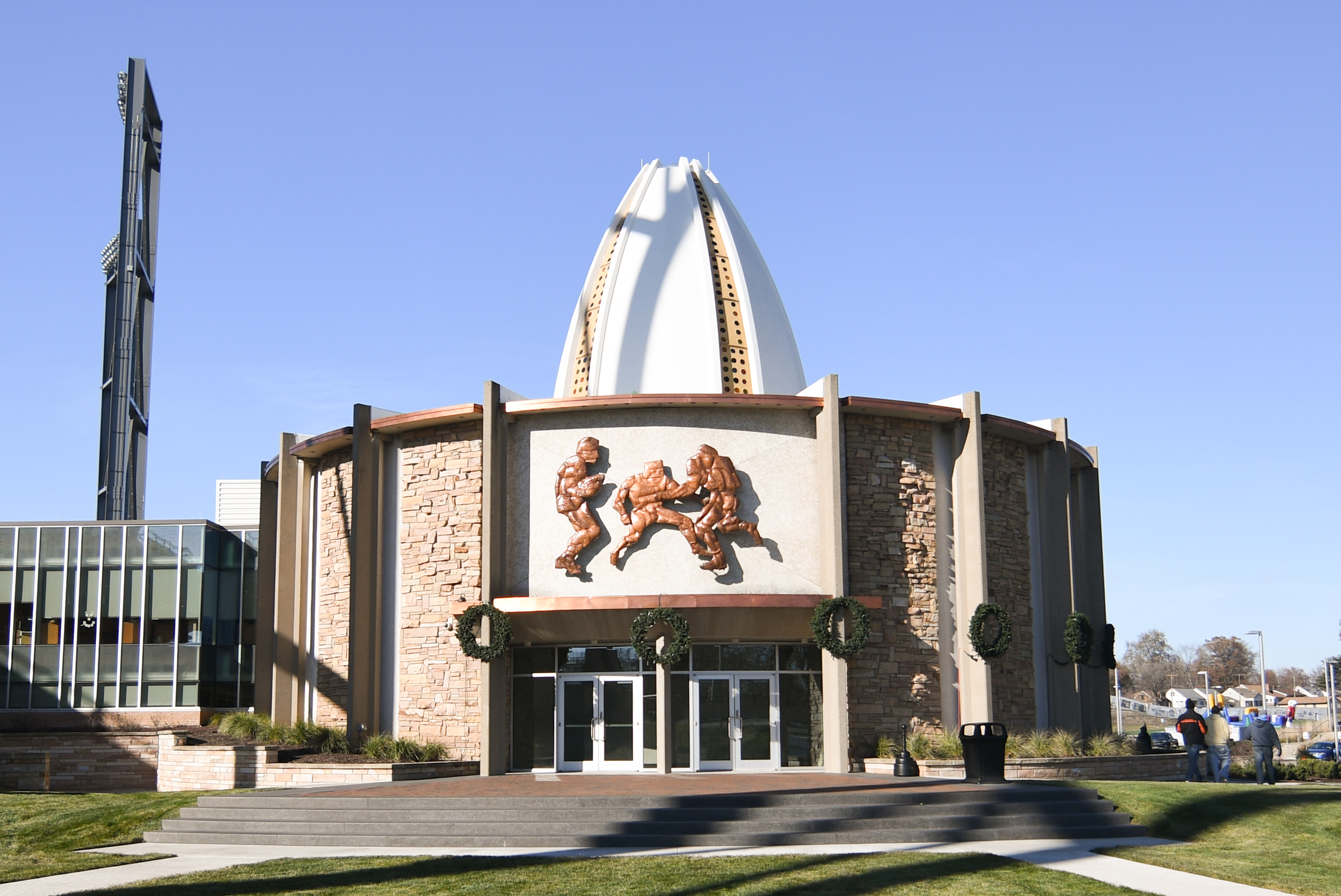
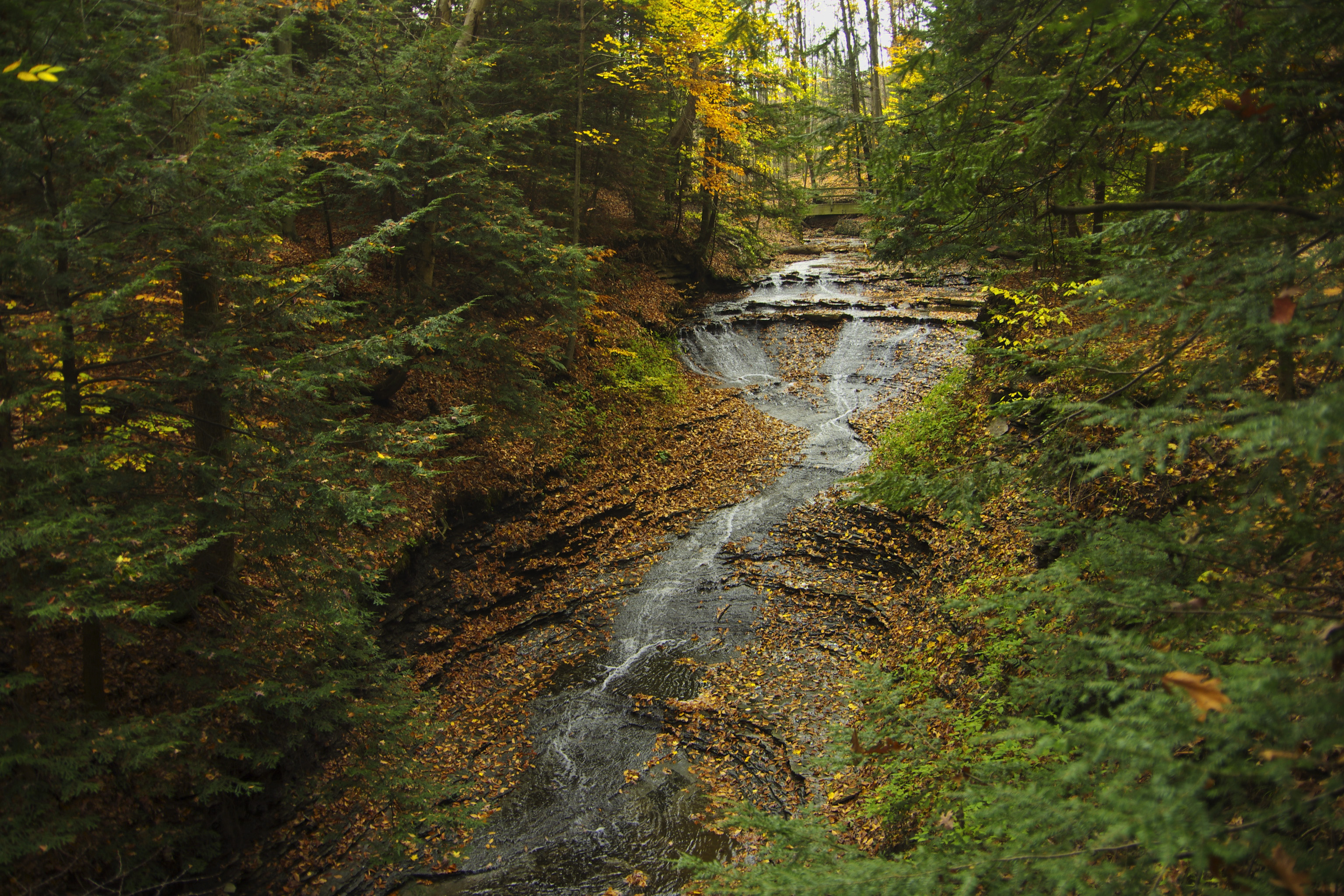
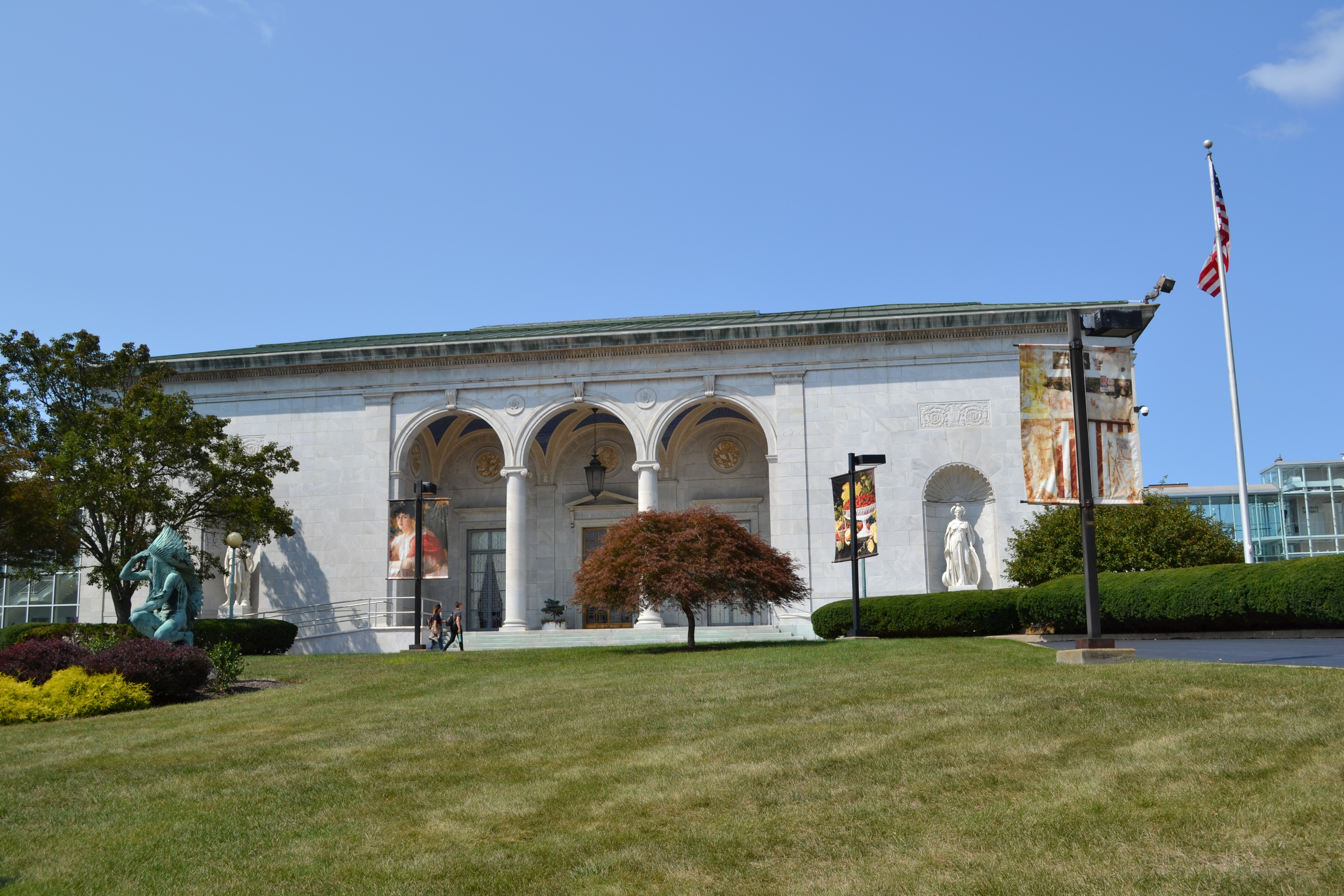
- From left to right: Downtown Cleveland, Stan Hywet Hall and Gardens in Akron, Pro Football Hall of Fame in Canton, Cuyahoga Valley National Park, and Butler Institute of American Art in Youngstown
- Map of counties in Northeast Ohio
- Coordinates: 41°N 81°W
- Country: United States
- State: Ohio
- Largest city: Cleveland
- Other cities: List: In Region: Akron; Parma; Canton; Lorain; Youngstown; Elyria; Cuyahoga Falls; Lakewood; Euclid

Area
  - Land: 8,520.29 sq mi (22,067.4 km^{2})
  - Water: 3,104.2 sq mi (8,040 km^{2})

Population (2020)
  - Total: 4,502,460
  - Density: 508.89/sq mi (196.48/km^{2})
- Time zone: UTC-5 (EST)
  - Summer (DST): UTC-4 (EDT)

Northeast Ohio is a geographic and cultural region that comprises the northeastern counties of the U.S. state of Ohio. Definitions of the region consist of 16 to 23 counties between the southern shore of Lake Erie and the foothills of the Appalachian Mountains, home to over 4.5 million people. It is anchored by the metropolitan area of Cleveland, the most populous city in the region with over 365,000 residents in 2024. Other metropolitan centers include Akron, Canton, Mansfield, and Youngstown. Northeast Ohio includes most of the area known historically as the Connecticut Western Reserve.

== Definition ==
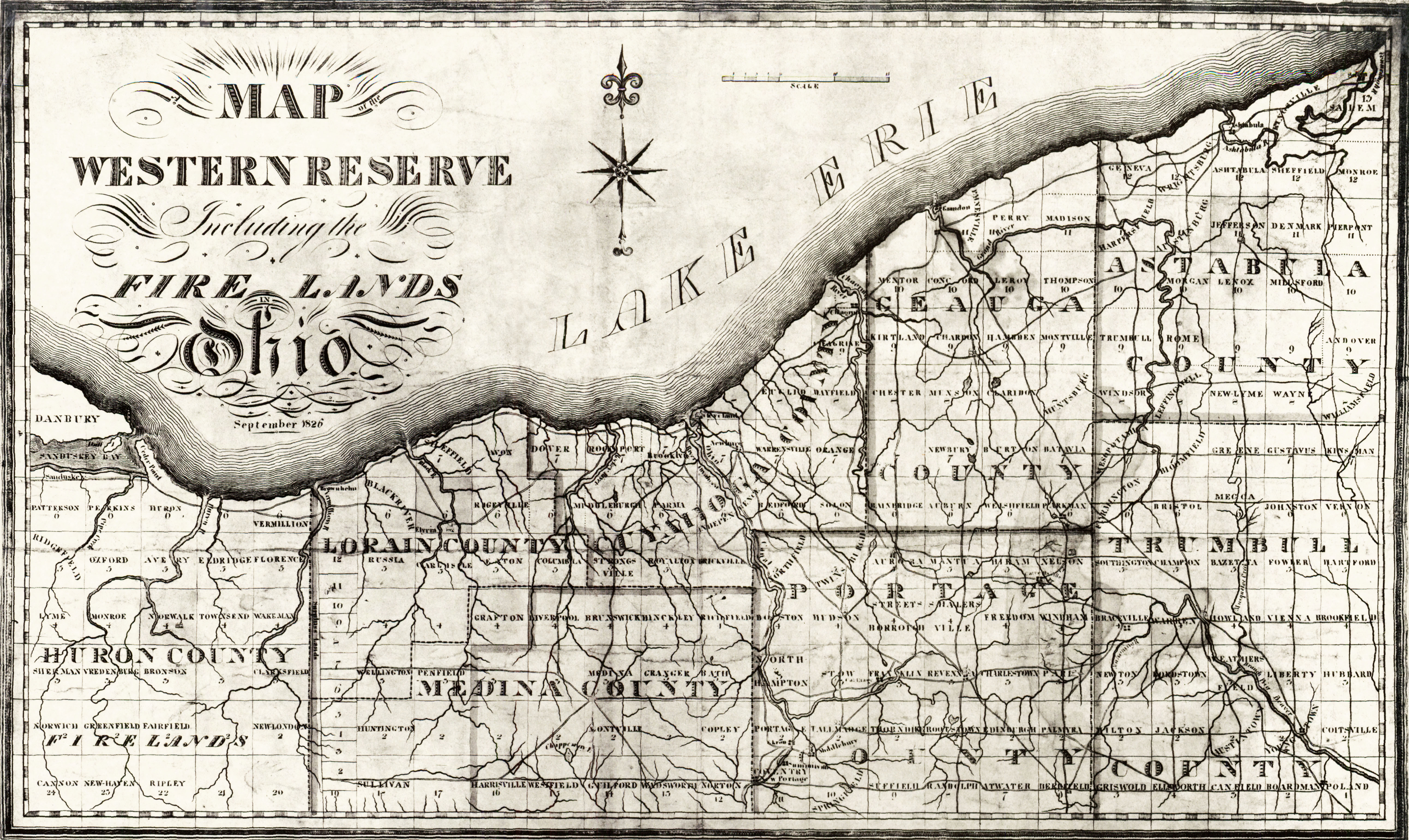
An 1826 map depicting the Connecticut Western Reserve

Different sources define the region as having various boundaries. In its most expansive usage, it contains six metropolitan statistical areas: Cleveland, Akron, Canton–Massillon, Youngstown–Warren, Mansfield, and Weirton–Steubenville along with eight micropolitan statistical areas. There are 23 counties in the region, with over 4.5 million residents and a labor force of almost 2.2 million. The GDP (nominal) of Northeast Ohio is over $195 billion, which makes it comparable to that of New Zealand or the Republic of Ireland.

=== Counties ===
- Ashland
- Ashtabula
- Carroll
- Columbiana
- Coshocton
- Cuyahoga
- Erie
- Geauga
- Harrison
- Holmes
- Huron
- Jefferson
- Lake
- Lorain
- Mahoning
- Medina
- Portage
- Richland
- Stark
- Summit
- Trumbull
- Tuscarawas
- Wayne

=== Combined statistical area ===
Most of Northeast Ohio is part of the Cleveland–Akron–Canton Combined Statistical Area, which ranked as the 17th-largest Combined Statistical Area (CSA) in the United States as of the 2020 Census with a population of 3,769,834. It includes the six counties that make up Greater Cleveland (Cuyahoga, Lake, Geauga, Lorain, Medina, and Ashtabula), the Akron metropolitan area (Portage and Summit counties), the Canton–Massillon metropolitan area (Stark and Carroll counties), and the Sandusky metropolitan areas, in addition to the Norwalk, New Philadelphia–Dover, Wooster, Fremont, and Coshocton micropolitan areas.

The Cleveland–Akron–Canton media market covers much of this area, including all of Northeast Ohio except for the Youngstown/Warren region. It is the 19th largest in the United States as of 2023, according to Nielsen Media Research. Northeast Ohio and the Cleveland CSA are also part of the larger Great Lakes Megalopolis.

== Economy ==
More than 37% of Fortune 500 companies are present in Northeast Ohio, through corporate headquarters, major divisions, subsidiaries, and sales offices. In addition, more than 150 international companies have a presence there. As of 2006, Northeast Ohio serves as the corporate headquarters of 23 Fortune 1000 firms (shown with 2017 rankings below):

- (#86) Progressive Insurance (Mayfield Village, insurance)
- (#180) Sherwin-Williams (Cleveland, paint)
- (#216) Goodyear Tire and Rubber Company (Akron, rubber)
- (#224) Parker-Hannifin (Cleveland, industrial manufacturer)
- (#294) FirstEnergy (Akron, utilities)
- (#407) J.M. Smucker Company (Orrville, food consumer products)
- (#411) KeyCorp (Cleveland, banking)
- (#421 in 2023) Avery Dennison (Mentor, adhesives)
- (#467) Cliffs Natural Resources (Cleveland, iron ore mining)/AK Steel Holdings/Mittal
- (#480) Travel Centers of America (Westlake, specialty retail)
- (#508) RPM International (Medina, chemicals)
- (#513) TransDigm Group (Cleveland, aerospace and defense)
- (#607) Diebold (North Canton, electronics)
- (#724) PolyOne Corporation (Avon Lake, chemicals)
- (#762) Medical Mutual of Ohio (Cleveland, health insurance)
- (#781) The Timken Company (North Canton, specialty steel)
- (#782) Aleris International, Inc. (Cleveland, metals)
- (#783) Lincoln Electric (Cleveland, arc welding equipment)
- (#792) Hyster-Yale Materials Handling (Cleveland, industrial machinery)
- (#806) Applied Industrial Technologies (Cleveland, bearings)
- (#811) A. Schulman (Fairlawn, chemicals)
- (#965) American Greetings (Cleveland, greeting cards)
- (#996) Nordson (Westlake, industrial machinery)

Other large employers include:

- Babcock & Wilcox (Barberton, energy technology and service provider)
- Cafaro (Niles, real estate development and property management)
- Cleveland Clinic (Cleveland, health care)
- DeBartolo Corporation (Boardman Township, real estate development and property management)
- Eaton Corporation (North American HQ - Beachwood, electrical parts manufacturing)
- Exal Corp Aluminum Production (Youngstown, metals)
- Ferro Corporation (Cleveland, advanced material manufacturing)
- Forest City Enterprises (Cleveland, real estate development)
- Gojo (Akron, chemicals)
- Home Savings and Loan (Youngstown, banking)
- IMG (Cleveland, sports marketing and management)
- Invacare (Elyria, medical products and equipment)
- Jones Day (Cleveland, legal services)
- Lubrizol Corporation (Wickliffe, lubricants and chemicals)
- Mayfran International (Cleveland, conveyors)
- Nacco Industries (Cleveland, industrial equipment)
- Nestlé USA (Solon, food processing)
- Roadway Express (Akron, logistics)
- Rockwell Automation (Mayfield Heights, industrial controls)
- SITE Centers (Beachwood, real estate development)
- Steris (Mentor, medical equipment)
- Summa Health System (Akron, health care)
- University Hospitals of Cleveland (Cleveland, health care)

== Higher education ==
Northeast Ohio is home to a number of higher education institutions, including:

- Allegheny Wesleyan College (Salem)
- Ashland University (Ashland)
- Baldwin Wallace University (Berea)
- Case Western Reserve University (Cleveland)
- Cleveland Institute of Art (Cleveland)
- Cleveland Institute of Electronics (Cleveland)
- Cleveland Institute of Music (Cleveland)
- Cleveland State University (Cleveland)
- Cuyahoga Community College (Cleveland, Highland Hills, Parma, and Westlake)
- DeVry University (Seven Hills)
- Fortis College (Cuyahoga Falls)
- Franciscan University of Steubenville (Steubenville)
- Heritage College of Osteopathic Medicine (Warrensville Heights)
- Hiram College (Hiram)
- John Carroll University (University Heights)
- Kent State University (Kent)
  - Kent State University at Ashtabula (Ashtabula)
  - Kent State University at East Liverpool (East Liverpool)
  - Kent State University at Geauga (Burton)
  - Kent State University at Salem (Salem)
  - Kent State University at Stark (Jackson Township)
  - Kent State University at Trumbull (Warren)
  - Kent State University at Tuscarawas (New Philadelphia)
  - Kent State University College of Podiatric Medicine (Independence)
- Kenyon College (Gambier)
- Lake Erie College (Painesville)
- Lakeland Community College (Kirtland)
- Lorain County Community College (Elyria)
- Malone University (Canton)
- Mount Vernon Nazarene University (Mount Vernon)
- Northeast Ohio Medical University (Rootstown)
- Oberlin College (Oberlin)
- Ohio State University, Mansfield Campus (Mansfield)
- Stark State College (Jackson Township, Ohio)
- Stautzenberger College (Brecksville)
- University of Akron (Akron)
  - Wayne College (Orrville)
  - Medina County University Center (Medina)
  - UA Lakewood (Lakewood)
- University of Mount Union, (Alliance)
- Ursuline College (Pepper Pike)
- Walsh University (North Canton)
- College of Wooster (Wooster)
- Youngstown State University (Youngstown)

== Sports and recreation ==
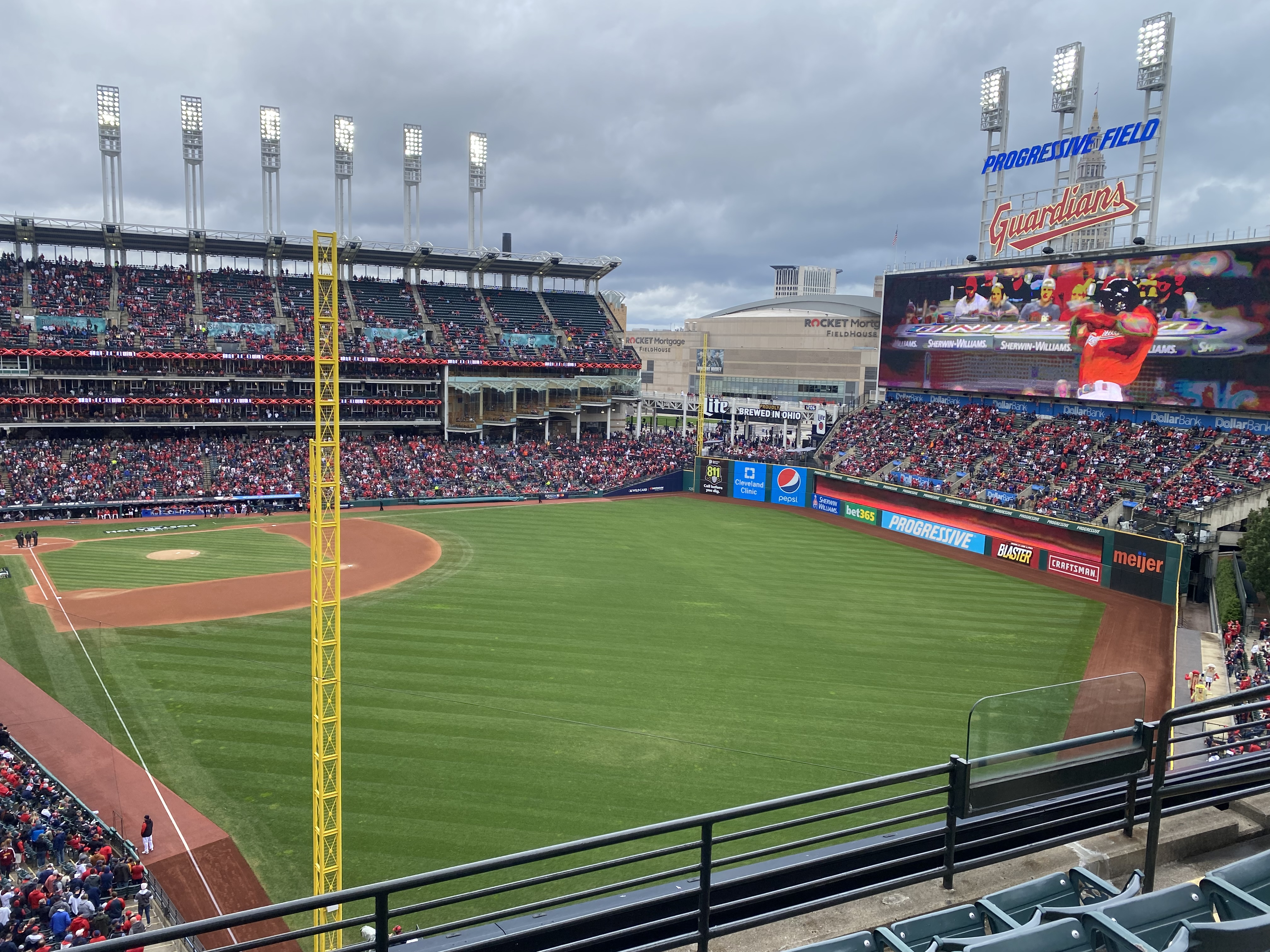
Progressive Field, home of the Cleveland Guardians

Northeast Ohio is home to a number of professional sports teams, including three from the major North American sports leagues. The Cleveland Guardians of Major League Baseball play at Progressive Field, Cleveland Browns of the National Football League (NFL) are based at Huntington Bank Field, and the Cleveland Cavaliers of the National Basketball Association (NBA) play at Rocket Arena. Rocket Arena is also home to one additional professional franchise, the Cleveland Monsters of the American Hockey League. The Monsters are the top minor league affiliate of the Columbus Blue Jackets of the National Hockey League (NHL).

There are a number of other professional sports teams in the region that play in various minor leagues. The Guardians have two minor league affiliates in the area: the AA Akron RubberDucks of the Eastern League who play at 7 17 Credit Union Park in Akron, and the High-A Lake County Captains of the Midwest League who play at Classic Park in Eastlake. The Mahoning Valley Scrappers, who play at Eastwood Field in Niles are members of the MLB Draft League since 2021. Additionally, there is an independent baseball team, the Lake Erie Crushers of the Frontier League, who play at Sprenger Stadium in Avon. The region also boasts of a lower league professional soccer team in Cleveland SC that plays at Don Shula Stadium. The Youngstown Phantoms are a junior ice hockey team in the United States Hockey League that has home games at Covelli Centre.

Motorsports venues in the region include Mid-Ohio Sports Car Course in Lexington and Summit Motorsports Park in Norwalk, a major NHRA venue.

The region is home to a number of NCAA athletic programs, including four in Division I: the Akron Zips, Cleveland State Vikings, Kent State Golden Flashes, and Youngstown State Penguins. Both Akron and Kent State are members of the Cleveland-based Mid-American Conference, while Cleveland State and Youngstown State are members of the Horizon League. Five schools compete at the NCAA Division II level: the Lake Erie Storm, Ursuline Arrows, Malone Pioneers, Ashland Eagles, and Walsh Cavaliers. There are nine schools at the Division III level: Mount Union Purple Raiders, Hiram Terriers, John Carroll Blue Streaks, Baldwin Wallace Yellow Jackets, Case Western Reserve Spartans, Kenyon Lords, Oberlin Yeomen, Wooster Scots, and Franciscan Barons. One school, the Mount Vernon Nazarene Cougars, competes in the National Association of Intercollegiate Athletics (NAIA).

The Cleveland Metroparks are a system of nature preserves that encircle the city, and the Cuyahoga Valley National Park encompasses the Cuyahoga River valley between Cleveland and Akron. The region is home to Mentor Headlands Beach, the longest natural beach on the Great Lakes.

== Transportation ==
=== Local transit ===
- Ashtabula County Transportation System
- Geauga County Transit
- Greater Cleveland Regional Transit Authority
- Laketran
- Lorain County Transit
- Medina County Transit
- METRO Regional Transit Authority
- Portage Area Regional Transportation Authority
- Richland County Transit
- Stark Area Regional Transit Authority
- Steel Valley Regional Transit Authority
- Western Reserve Transit Authority

=== Amtrak stations ===
- Alliance station
- Cleveland Lakefront Station
- Elyria station
- Sandusky station

=== Highways ===
==== Interstate highways ====
- Interstate 71
- Interstate 271
- Interstate 76
- Interstate 77
- Interstate 80
- Interstate 480
- Interstate 90
- Interstate 490
- Interstate 277
- Interstate 680

==== US highways ====
- U.S. Route 6
- U.S. Route 20
- U.S. Route 30
- U.S. Route 42
- U.S. Route 62
- U.S. Route 224
- U.S. Route 250
- U.S. Route 322
- U.S. Route 422

=== Airports ===
| City served | FAA | IATA | ICAO | Airport name | Role | Enpl. |
|---|---|---|---|---|---|---|
**Commercial service – primary airports**
| Akron / Canton | CAK | CAK | KCAK | **Akron-Canton Regional Airport** | Small hub | 265,889 |
| Cleveland | CLE | CLE | KCLE | **Cleveland-Hopkins International Airport** | Medium hub | 4,237,795 |
| Youngstown / Warren | YNG | YNG | KYNG | **Youngstown-Warren Regional Airport** / Youngstown ARS | Non-hub | 1,624 |
**Reliever airports**
| Cleveland | BKL | BKL | KBKL | Burke Lakefront Airport | | 1,764 |
| Highland Heights / Richmond Heights / Willoughby Hills | CGF | CGF | KCGF | Cuyahoga County Airport | | 45 |
| Lorain / Elyria | LPR | LPR | KLPR | Lorain County Regional Airport | | 7 |
| Medina | 1G5 | | | Medina Municipal Airport | | |
| Willoughby | LNN | LNN | KLNN | Lake County Executive Airport | | |
**General aviation airports**
| Akron | AKR | **AKC** | KAKR | Akron Fulton International Airport | | 10 |
| Alliance | 2D1 | | | Barber Airport | | |
| Ashland | 3G4 | | | Ashland County Airport | | |
| Ashtabula | HZY | **JFN** | KHZY | Northeast Ohio Regional Airport | | 2 |
| Carrollton | TSO | | KTSO | Carroll County-Tolson Airport | | |
| East Liverpool | 02G | | | Columbiana County Airport | | |
| Kent | 1G3 | | | Kent State University Airport | | |
| Middlefield | 7G8 | | | Geauga County Airport | | |
| Mansfield | MFD | KMFD | MFD | Mansfield Lahm Regional Airport | | 2 |
| Millersburg | 10G | | | Holmes County Airport | | |
| Ravenna | POV | | KPOV | Portage County Airport | | |
| Warren | 62D | | | Warren Airport | | |
| Wooster | BJJ | BJJ | KBJJ | Wayne County Airport | | 4 |
| Akron | 1D4 | | | Mayfield Airport | | |
| Alliance | 4G3 | | | Miller Airport | | |
| Carrollton | 5D6 | | | Parsons Airport | | |
| Clyde | 5D9 | | | Bandit Field Airdrome | | |
| Columbia Station | 4G8 | | | Columbia Airport | | |
| Elyria | 1G1 | | | Elyria Airport | | |
| Garrettsville | 7D8 | | | Gates Airport | | |
| Geneva | 7D9 | | | Germack Airport | | |
| Hiram | 86D | | | Far View Airport | | |
| Huron | 88D | | | Hinde Airport | | |
| Newton Falls | 41N | | | Braceville Airport | | |
| Norwalk | 5A1 | | | Norwalk-Huron County Airport | | |
| Concord Township | 2G1 | | | Concord Airpark | | |
| Youngstown | 4G4 | | | Youngstown Elser Metro Airport | | |
| Youngstown | 04G | | | Lansdowne Airport | | |

Definition of abbreviations:
- **FAA** – The location identifier assigned by the Federal Aviation Administration (FAA).
- **IATA** – The airport code assigned by the International Air Transport Association (IATA). Those that do not match the FAA code are shown in bold.
- **ICAO** – The location indicator assigned by the International Civil Aviation Organization (ICAO).
- **Enpl**. – The number of enplanements (commercial passenger boardings) that occurred at the airport in calendar year 2022, as per FAA records.

== Area codes ==
Area code map of Ohio and surrounding states

In the 1950s, AT&T assigned most of Northeast Ohio area code 216. The western half of the region, including Ashland and Richland counties, and parts of Huron, Wayne and Erie counties, was assigned area code 419. In 1996, area code 216 was reduced in size to cover the northern half of its prior area, centering on Cleveland. Area code 330 was introduced for the southern half of Northeast Ohio, including Summit, Portage, Medina, Stark, Columbiana and Mahoning counties, and much of Wayne, Trumbull and Tuscarawas counties.

Area code 216 was further split in 1997 as the need for additional phone numbers grew. Area code 440 was introduced to cover the remainder of was what previously area code 216, including all of Lake, Lorain, Ashtabula and Geauga counties, and parts of Trumbull, Huron, Erie and Cuyahoga counties, while Area code 216 was again reduced in geographical area to cover the city of Cleveland and its inner ring suburbs. Some communities, such as Parma and Parma Heights, were divided into multiple area codes. In 1999, Congressman Dennis Kucinich introduced federal legislation to protect small and medium-sized cities from being split into two or more area codes.

In 2000, it was anticipated that the available phone numbers in area code 330 would be exhausted, and an overlay area code was introduced. Area code 234 was assigned to overlap existing area code 330. With the creation of area code 234, any new phone number in the geographical area formerly covered by area code 330 could be assigned a phone number in either the 234 or 330 area codes, with no change in local or long distance toll status. This made necessary the use of ten-digit dialing within the 330/234 area code region. After the introduction of area code 234, assignments of new telephone numbers in the area did not continue at an accelerated pace, and new phone numbers for area code 234 were not assigned until 2003.

It was announced in 2023 that by the third quarter of 2024, area code 440 would be exhausted. Area code 436 was assigned to overlap the existing area code 440. Any new phone number in the geographical area formerly covered by area code 440 could be assigned a phone number in either the 436 or 440 area codes.

== See also ==
- Ohio statistical areas
