= Ken Hammond =

Ken Hammond may refer to:

- Ken Hammond (historian), professor of history at New Mexico State University
- Ken Hammond (ice hockey) (born 1963), Canadian ice hockey player
- Ken Hammond (newsreader), Irish newsreader.
