= Kent State University at Ashtabula =

Satellite campus in Ashtabula, Ohio, US

- Type: Public satellite campus
- Established: 1958; 68 years ago
- Parent institution: Kent State University
- Dean: Susan Stocker
- Students: 1,128
- Location: Ashtabula, Ohio, United States; 41°53′19″N 80°49′55″W
- Campus: Suburban 125 acres (51 ha)
- Website: www.kent.edu/ashtabula

Kent State University at Ashtabula is a satellite campus of Kent State University. The campus is located in Ashtabula, Ohio, United States, and was established in 1958. It is the northernmost of Kent State's seven satellite campuses in Northeast Ohio, known as regional campuses, approximately 60 miles (97 km) northeast of the main campus in Kent. Students can begin any of Kent State's nearly 300 undergraduate majors, and can complete several bachelor's degrees as well as more than 20 associate programs entirely at the Ashtabula campus. Classes have been held at the present campus since 1967.

== Academics ==
=== Nursing ===
Kent State Ashtabula is known locally for its nursing program, which accounts for nearly 75 percent of registered nurses in Ashtabula County.

=== Wine ===
Kent State University at Ashtabula established a wine program in the fall of 2011, offering two-year associate degrees in viticulture and oenology. In November 2017, the university partnered with a local vineyard to purvey its wine. As of February 2019, these wine degree programs are the sole ones of their type available in the entire state of Ohio.
