= Kent State University =

Public university in Kent, Ohio, US

- Former names: Ohio State Normal College At Kent (1910–1911); Kent State Normal School (1911–1915); Kent State Normal College (1915–1929); Kent State College (1929–1935)
- Type: Public research university
- Established: September 27, 1910; 116 years ago
- Parent institution: University System of Ohio
- Academic affiliations: Northeast Ohio Medical University; Space-grant
- Endowment: $218.5 million (2025)
- President: Todd Diacon
- Provost: Melody Tankersley
- Students: 25,830 (Kent); 33,319 (all campuses)
- Undergraduates: 22,563 (Kent); 28,628 (all campuses)
- Postgraduates: 4,473 (Kent); 4,480 (all campuses)
- Location: Kent, Ohio, United States; 41°08′49″N 81°20′36″W
- Campus: Suburban college town 953 acres (386 ha) (Main campus)
- Colors: Blue and gold
- Nickname: Golden Flashes
- Sporting affiliations: NCAA Division I – MAC
- Mascot: Flash the Golden Eagle
- Website: kent.edu

Kent State University (KSU) is a public research university in Kent, Ohio, United States. The university includes seven regional campuses in Northeast Ohio located in Ashtabula, Burton, East Liverpool, Jackson Township, New Philadelphia, Salem, and Warren, along with additional regional and international facilities in Cleveland, Independence, and Twinsburg, Ohio; New York City; and Florence, Italy.

The university was established in 1910 as a normal school. The first classes were held in 1912 at various locations and in temporary buildings in Kent and the first buildings of the original campus opened the following year. Since that time the university has grown to include many additional baccalaureate and graduate programs of study in the arts and sciences, research opportunities, as well as over 1,000 acres (405 ha) and 119 buildings on the Kent campus. During the late 1960s and early 1970s the university was known internationally for its student activism in opposition to U.S. involvement in the Vietnam War, due mainly to the Kent State shootings in 1970.

As of 2025, Kent State was the third-largest university in Ohio with an enrollment of over 33,000 students in the eight-campus system and over 25,000 students at the main campus in Kent. Kent State offers over 300 degree programs, among them 250 baccalaureate, 40 associate, 50 master's, and 23 doctoral programs of study. It is a member of the University System of Ohio and is classified by the Carnegie Classification of Institutions of Higher Education among "R1: Doctoral Universities – very high research activity".

== History ==
=== Early history ===
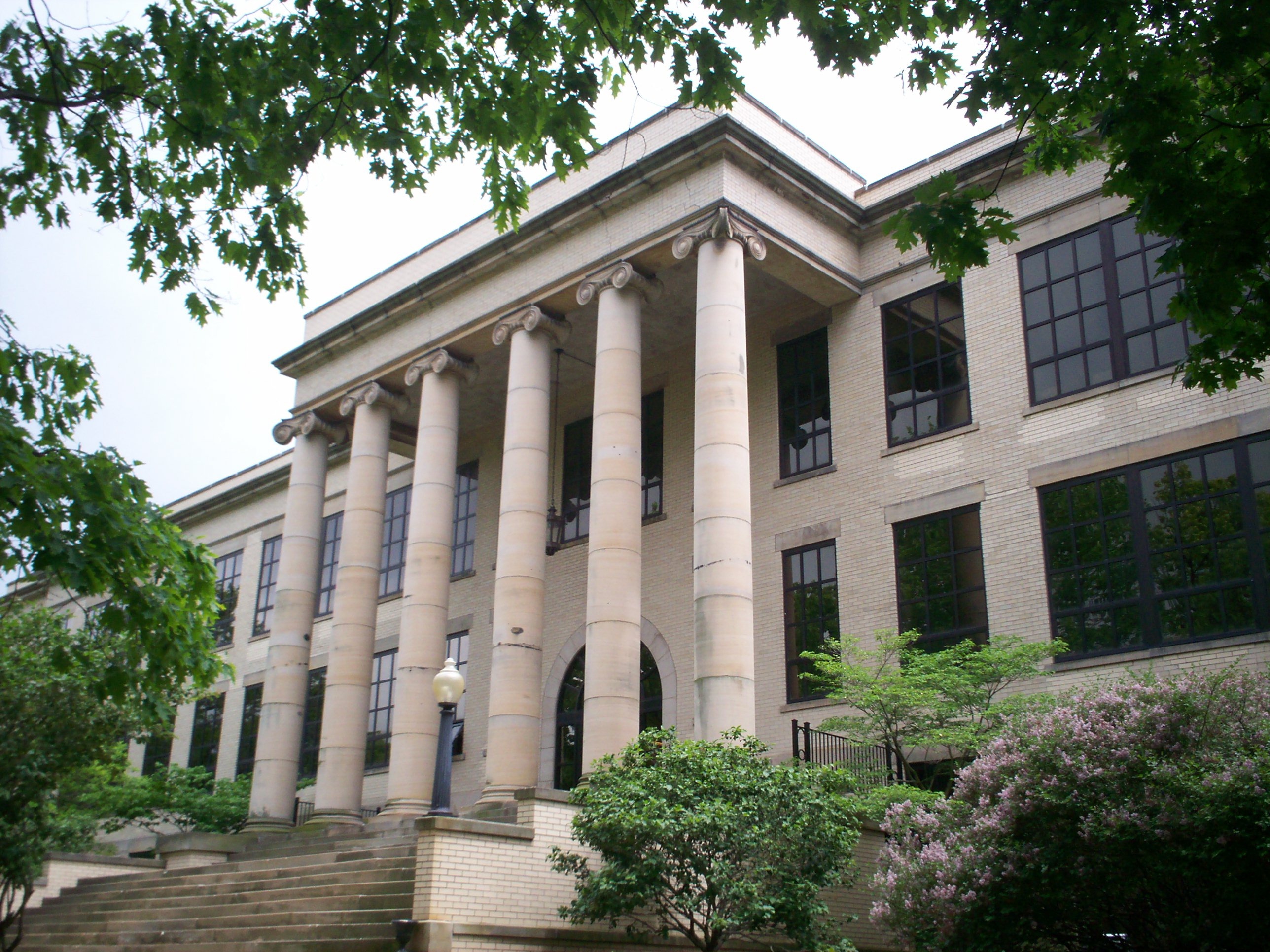
Front of Merrill Hall, completed in 1913 as the first building on campus

Kent State University was established in 1910 as an institution for training public school teachers. It was part of the Lowry Bill, which also created a sister school in Bowling Green, Ohio – now known as Bowling Green State University. It was initially known under the working name of the Ohio State Normal College At Kent, but was named Kent State Normal School in honor of William S. Kent, son of the city’s namesake, who donated significant portions of land to the school. The first president was John Edward McGilvrey, who served from 1912 to 1926. McGilvrey had an ambitious vision for the school as a large university, instructing architect George F. Hammond, who designed the original campus buildings, to produce a master plan. Classes began in 1912 before any buildings had been completed at the campus in Kent. These classes were held at extension centers in 25 cities around the region. By May 1913, classes were being held on the campus in Kent with the opening of Merrill Hall. The school graduated 34 students in its first commencement on July 29, 1914. In 1915, the school was renamed Kent State Normal College due to the addition of four-year degrees. By then additional buildings had been added or were under construction. Kent State's enrollment growth was particularly notable during its summer terms. In 1924, the school's registration for summer classes was the largest of any teacher-training school in the United States. In 1929, the state of Ohio changed the name to Kent State College as it allowed the school to establish a college of arts and sciences.

McGilvrey's vision for Kent was not shared by many others outside the school, particularly at the state level and at other state schools. His efforts to have the state funding formula changed created opposition, particularly from Ohio State University and its president William Oxley Thompson. This resulted in a 1923 "credit war" where Ohio State refused Kent transfer credits and spread to several other schools taking similar action. It was this development – along with several other factors – which led to the firing of McGilvrey in January 1926. McGilvrey was succeeded first by David Allen Anderson (1926–1928) and James Ozro Engleman from 1928 to 1938, though he continued to be involved with the school for several years as president emeritus and as head of alumni relations from 1934 to 1945. He was present in Columbus on May 17, 1935, when Kent native Governor Martin L. Davey signed a bill that allowed Kent State and Bowling Green to add schools of business administration and graduate programs, giving them each university status; the college's name was thus changed to Kent State University.

=== 1940s to 1960s ===
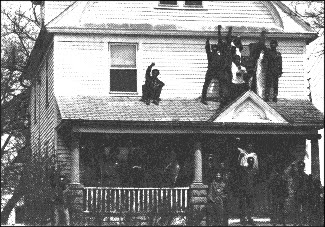
Kuumba House in 1969

From 1944 to 1963, the university was led by President George Bowman. During his tenure, the student senate, faculty senate and graduate council were organized. Although it had served Stark County from the 1920s, in 1946, the university's first regional campus, the Stark Campus, was established in Canton, Ohio. In the fall of 1947, Bowman appointed Oscar W. Ritchie as a full-time faculty member. Ritchie's appointment to the faculty made him the first African American to serve on the faculty at Kent State and also made him the first African American professor to serve on the faculty of any state university in Ohio. In 1977, the former Student Union, which had been built in 1949, was rededicated as Oscar Ritchie Hall in his honor. Recently renovated, Oscar Ritchie Hall currently houses the department of Pan-African Studies the Center of Pan-African Culture, the Henry Dumas Library, the Institute for African American Affairs, the Garrett Morgan Computer Lab and the African Community Theatre.

The 1950s and 1960s saw continued growth in both enrollment and in the physical size of the campus. Several new dorms and academic buildings were built during this time, including the establishment of additional regional campuses in Warren (1954), Ashtabula (1957), New Philadelphia (1962), Salem (1962), Burton (1964), and East Liverpool, Ohio (1965). In 1961, grounds superintendent Larry Wooddell and Biff Staples of the Davey Tree Expert Company released ten cages of black squirrels obtained from Victoria Park in London, Ontario, Canada, onto the Kent State campus. By 1964 their estimated population was around 150 and today they have spread in and around Kent and have become unofficial mascots of both the city and university. Since 1981, the annual Black Squirrel Festival is held every fall on campus.

In 1965, chemistry professor Glenn H. Brown established the Liquid Crystal Institute, a world leader in the research and development of the multibillion-dollar liquid crystal industry. James Fergason invented and patented the basic TN LCD in 1969 and ten liquid crystal companies have been spun off from the institute.

In 1967, Kent State became the first university to run an independent, student-operated Campus Bus Service. It was unique in that it provided jobs for students, receiving funding from student fees rather than bus fares. Campus Bus Service was the largest such operation in the country until it merged with the Portage Area Regional Transportation Authority in 2004. 1969 saw the opening of a new Memorial Stadium on the far eastern edge of campus and the closure and dismantling of the old Memorial Stadium.

=== Kent State shootings ===
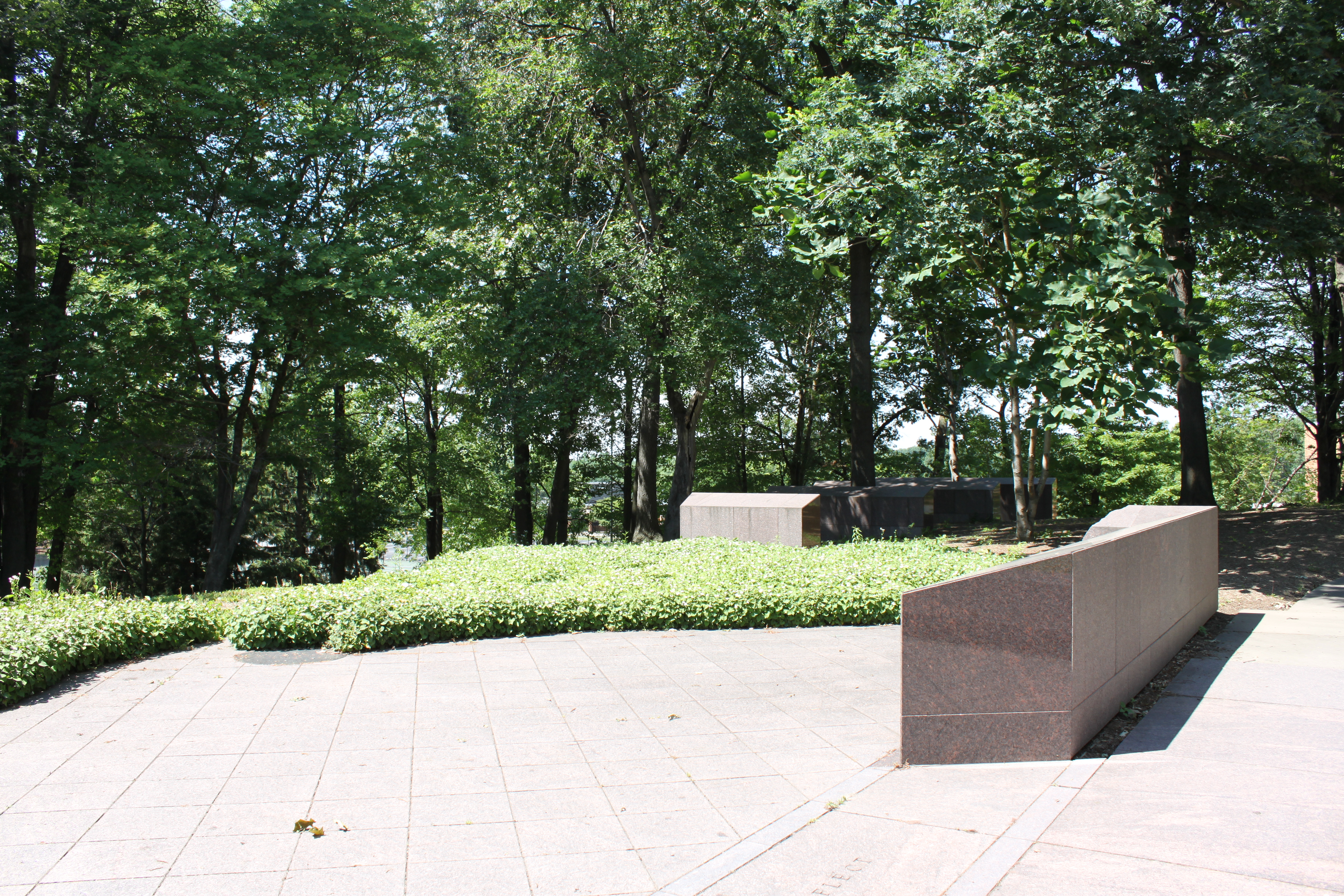
The May 4 Memorial commemorating the Kent State shootings

Kent State gained international attention on May 4, 1970, when an Ohio Army National Guard unit fired at students during an anti-war protest on campus, killing four and wounding nine. The Guard had been called into Kent after several protests in and around campus had become violent, including a riot in downtown Kent and the burning of the ROTC building. The main cause of the protests was the United States' invasion of Cambodia during the Vietnam War. The shootings caused an immediate closure of the campus with students and faculty given just 60 minutes to pack belongings. Around the country, many college campuses canceled classes or closed for fear of similar violent protests. In Kent, schools were closed and the National Guard restricted entry into the city limits, patrolling the area until May 8. With the campus closed, faculty members came up with a variety of solutions—including holding classes in their homes, at public buildings and places, via telephone, or through the mail—to allow their students to complete the term, which was only a few weeks away at the time.

In 1971, the university established the Center for Peaceful Change, now known as the Center for Applied Conflict Management, as a "living memorial" to the students who had died. It offers degree programs in Peace and Conflict Studies and Conflict Resolution and is one of the earliest such programs in the United States.

In response to, and protest of, the Kent State shootings, Neil Young wrote the song "Ohio" which was performed by the folk rock group Crosby, Stills, Nash & Young. In remembrance of the tragedy, a group of professors and students created a website that features a map with oral histories and eyewitness accounts of the event.

=== 1970s to 1980s ===
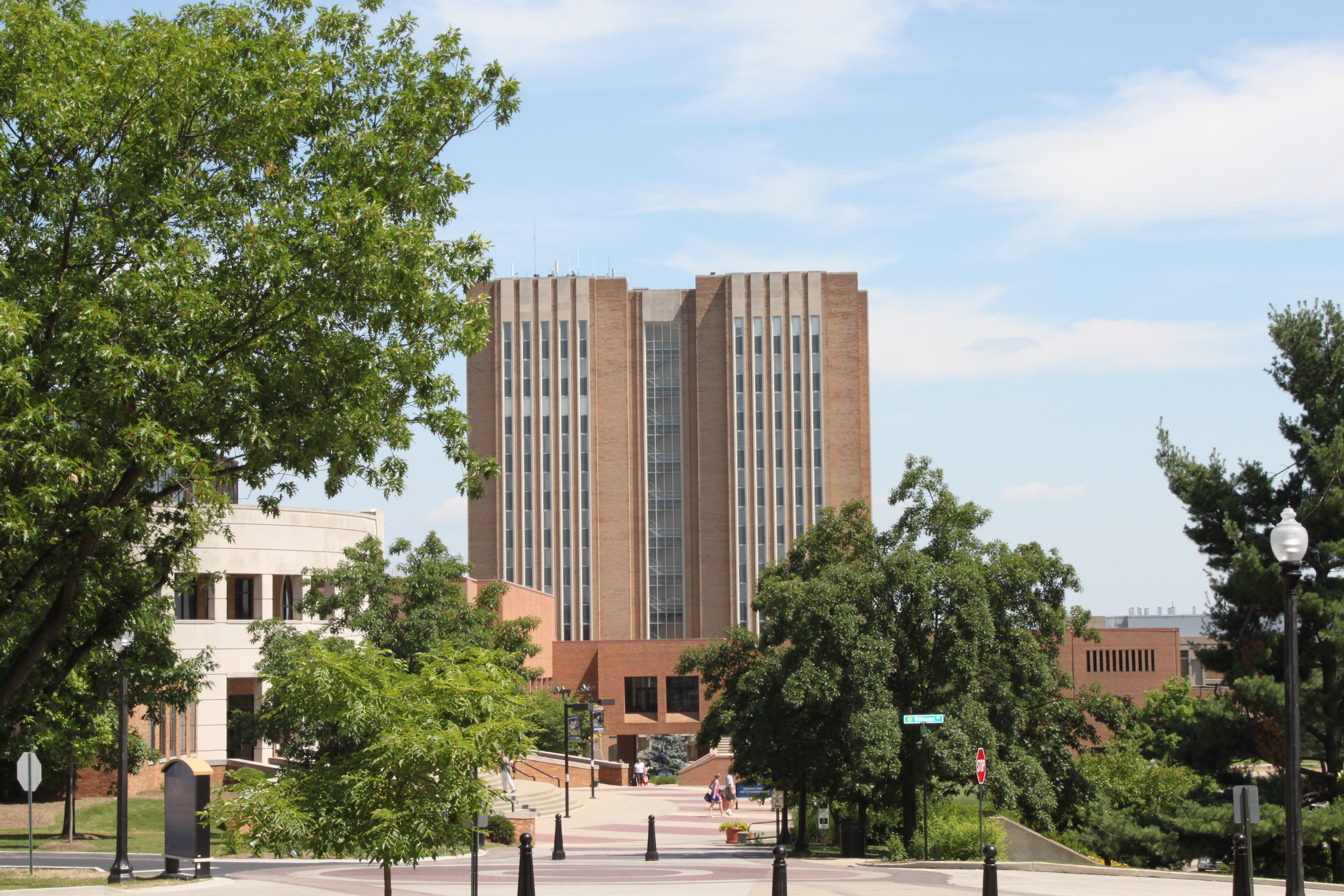
Kent State University Library via Esplanade, which extends from College Towers Apartments to the downtown area of Kent

Also in 1970, the university opened its 12-story library, moving from the previous home of Rockwell Hall to the tallest building in Portage County. Dedicated in 1971, the library became a member of the Association of Research Libraries in 1973. Kent State joined with the University of Akron and Youngstown State University in establishing the Northeastern Ohio Universities College of Medicine in 1973. It was the world's first medical consortium. Today it includes a college of pharmacy and Cleveland State University as an additional consortium member.

Kent State was again in the national spotlight in 1977 when construction was set to begin on the Memorial Gym Annex, adjacent to the area where the Kent State shootings had occurred in 1970. Protesters organized a tent city in May, which lasted into July. Several attempts were made to block construction even after the end of the tent city, including an appeal to the United States Congress and the Department of the Interior to have the area declared a National Historic Landmark, which ended up being unsuccessful. Additional rallies were held that year, including one attended by Joan Baez on August 20. After several additional unsuccessful legal challenges, construction finally began on September 19 and was finished in 1979.

=== 1990–present ===
In March 1991, Kent State once again made history by appointing Carol Cartwright as president of the university, the first female to hold such a position at any state university in Ohio. In 1994, Kent State was named a "Research University II" by the Carnegie Foundation. Beginning in the late 1990s, the university began a series of building renovations and construction, which included the complete renovation of the historic original campus, the construction of several new residence halls, a student recreation center, and additional academic buildings on the Kent Campus and at the regional campuses. In September 2010, the university announced its largest student body ever, with a total enrollment of 41,365. U.S. News & World Report's 2017 rankings put Kent State as tied for #188 for National Universities and tied for #101 in Top Public Schools. Kent State had a Fall 2015 acceptance rate of 85%.

== Campuses ==
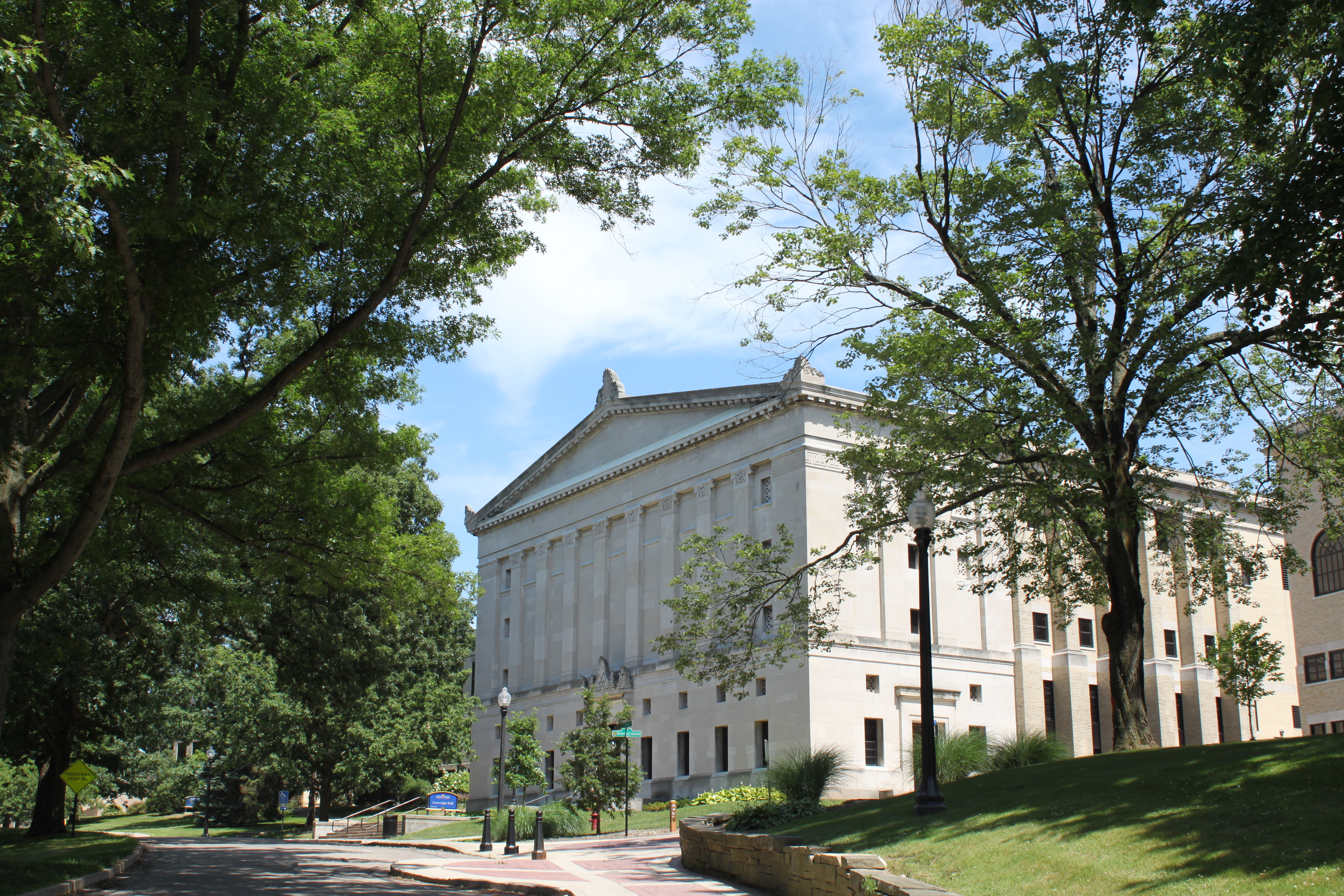
Cartwright Hall

Kent State University is an eight-campus system in Northeast Ohio, with the main administrative center and largest campus in Kent.

=== Kent ===
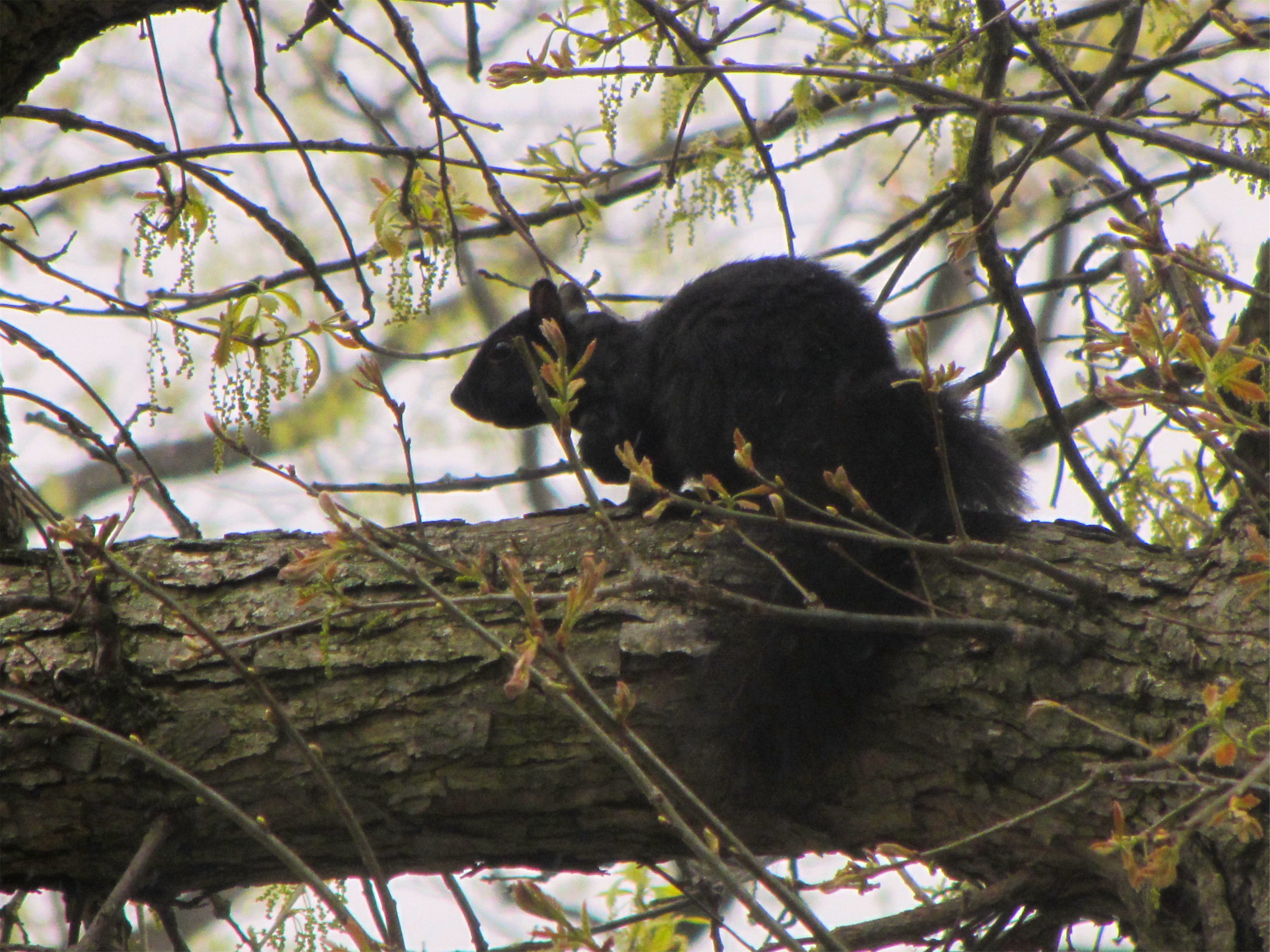
A black squirrel on the Kent Campus

Within the Kent State University system, the main campus is officially referred to as the "Kent Campus". The Kent Campus is a landscaped suburban environment in the Greater Akron area. It covers approximately 866 acres (3.5 km^{2}), which house over 100 buildings, gardens, bike trails, and open greenery. There are also thousands of additional acres of bogs, marshes, and wildlife refuges adjacent to or near the campus.

While the university's official mascot is Flash the golden eagle, the campus also has an unofficial mascot in the squirrels, which were brought to Kent in 1961 and can be found on and around the campus. The campus is divided into North, South, and East sections but many areas have come to be referred to as Front Campus, Residential Campus, and Science Row. The main hub of activity and central point is the Student Center and Risman Plaza, which is adjacent to the twelve-story main library. The university also operated the 18-hole Kent State Golf Course until 2017, and currently operates Centennial Research Park just east of campus in Franklin Township and the 219-acre (0.9 km^{2}) Kent State University Airport in Stow.

=== Regional campuses ===
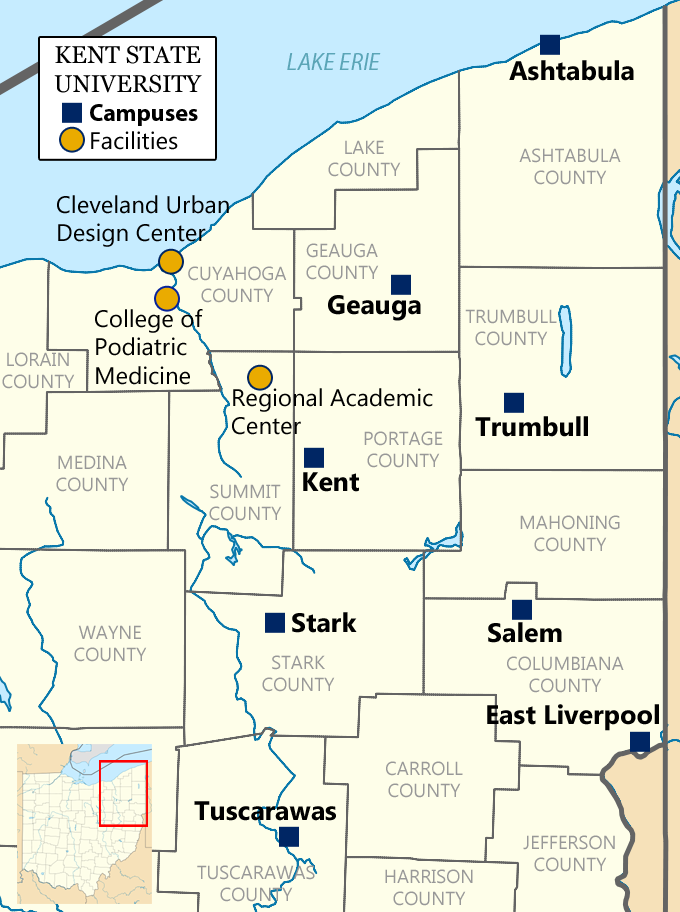
Map of KSU campuses and facilities in Northeast Ohio

In addition to the Kent Campus, there are seven regional campuses. The regional campuses provide open enrollment and are generally treated as in-house community colleges as opposed to the large university feel of the Kent Campus. Students at the regional campuses can begin any of Kent State's majors at their respective campus and each campus offers its own unique programs and opportunities that may or may not be available in Kent. Regional campuses include:

==== Ashtabula ====
The Ashtabula Campus was established in 1958 and is made up of four buildings: Main Hall, a library, the Bookstore Building, and the Robert S. Morrison Health and Science Building. It is on a 125-acre (51 ha) site in Ashtabula, just south of Lake Erie. The campus offers 27 associate and bachelor's degree programs of its own, with the nursing program being the largest. Approximately 75% of registered nurses working in Ashtabula County graduated with an associate degree in nursing from Kent State at Ashtabula.

==== East Liverpool ====
The East Liverpool Campus was established in 1965 from facilities formerly owned by the East Liverpool City School District, occupying a downtown site overlooking the Ohio River. It is composed of the Main Building, Memorial Auditorium, Mary Patterson Building, and a Commons area.

==== Geauga ====
The Geauga Campus is located on an 87-acre (35 ha) campus in Burton Township, just north of the village of Burton in Geauga County. It was established in 1964 and, as of 2021, has an enrollment of 1,276 students. Six associate degree and seven baccalaureate degree programs can be taken in their entirety at the campus. The Geauga Campus also administers the Regional Academic Center, a facility located in Twinsburg, Ohio.

==== Salem ====
Kent State at Salem is located in Salem Township, just south of the city of Salem. The 100-acre (40 ha) campus features a lake, outdoor classroom, and nature walk. Kent State University at Salem also owns and operates the "City Center" facility in the former home of Salem Middle School and Salem High School, in which administrative offices, classes, and student services are located.

==== Stark ====
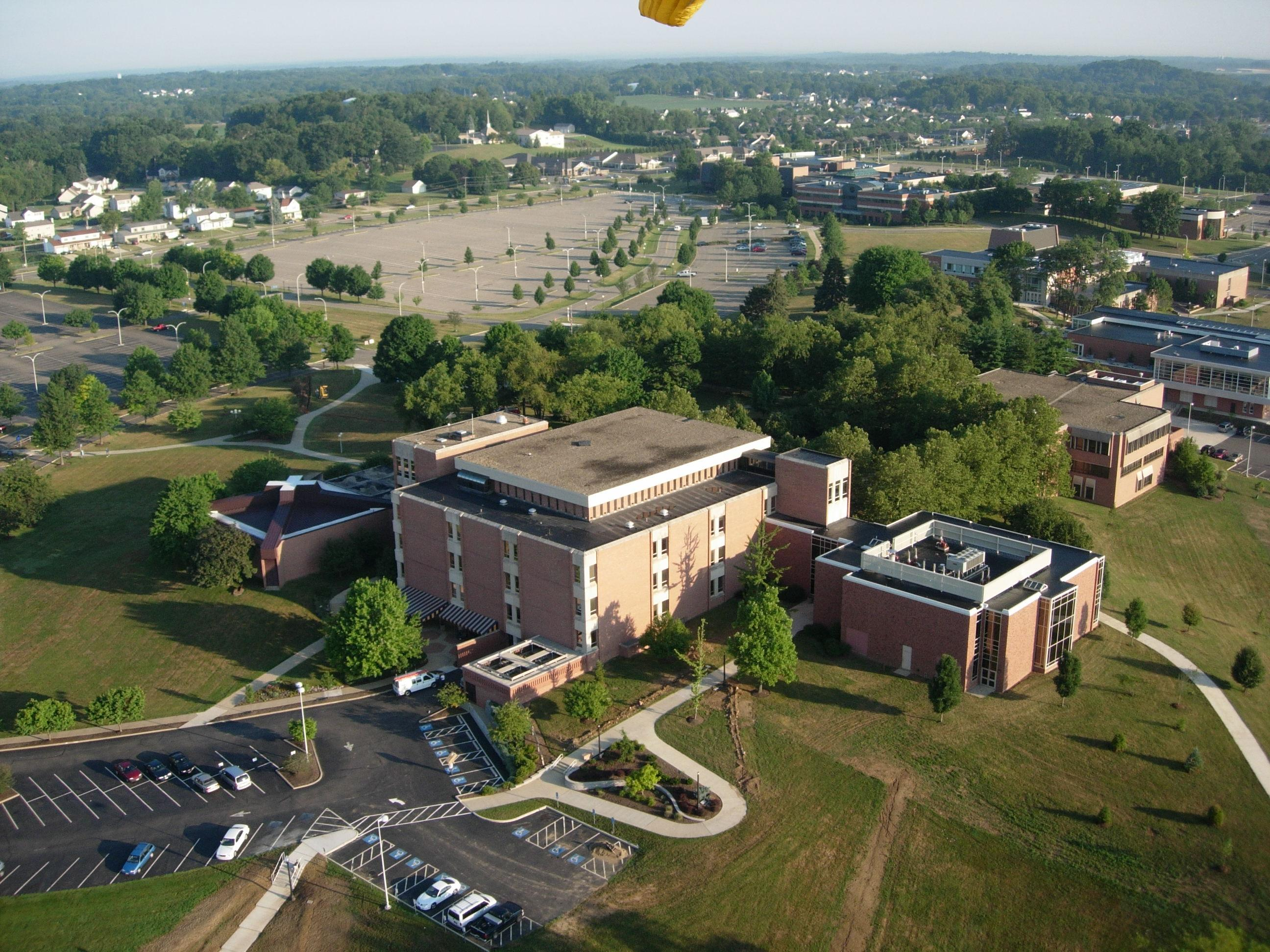
Kent State University at Stark

The Stark Campus is the largest regional campus of Kent State University, with an enrollment of over 2,900 students as of 2021. The campus serves around 11,000 students total each year through professional development and other academic coursework classes. It is located on 200-acre (81 ha) in Jackson Township in Stark County. The campus includes seven major buildings and a natural pond. Additionally, the Stark Campus includes the Corporate University and Conference Center, an advanced meeting, training, and events facility that is one of only ten such centers in the state of Ohio affiliated with the International Association of Conference Centers. The center also serves as a home to the Corporate University, which provides training and learning exercises for area businesses and organizations. Kent State University at Stark offers 24 complete degree programs, including three associate degree, 18 bachelor's degree, and three master's degree programs.

==== Trumbull ====
Kent State's Trumbull Campus is located just north of Warren in Champion Heights, Ohio, on SR 45 near the SR 5–SR 82 bypass. As of 2021, it has an enrollment of 1,158 students. It offers programs in 170 majors at the freshman and sophomore level, as well as 18 certificates and 15 associate degree programs. In addition, there is upper division coursework for baccalaureate degree completion in nursing, justice studies, technology, business management, Theatre, and English, as well as general studies and psychology degrees. In 2004 the campus opened a 68,000-square-foot (6,300 m^{2}) Technology Building that includes the Workforce Development and Continuing Studies Center.

==== Tuscarawas ====
The Tuscarawas Campus in New Philadelphia, Ohio offers 19 associate degrees, six bachelor's degrees, and the Master of Technology Degree. Bachelor's degrees are offered in business management, general studies, justice studies, industrial technology, nursing and technology 2+2. As of 2021, it has an enrollment of 1,245 students. The Science and Advanced Technology Center provides 50,000 square feet (5,000 m^{2}) of laboratory and classroom space for science, nursing and workforce development. The Tuscarawas Campus has constructed a 55,000-square-foot (5,100 m^{2}), $13.5 million Fine and Performing Arts center that will enable the campus to expand academic and cultural programming.

=== Additional facilities ===
In addition to the eight campuses in northeast Ohio, Kent State operates additional facilities for programs in Cleveland, New York City, Florence, and Shanghai.

==== Florence Center ====
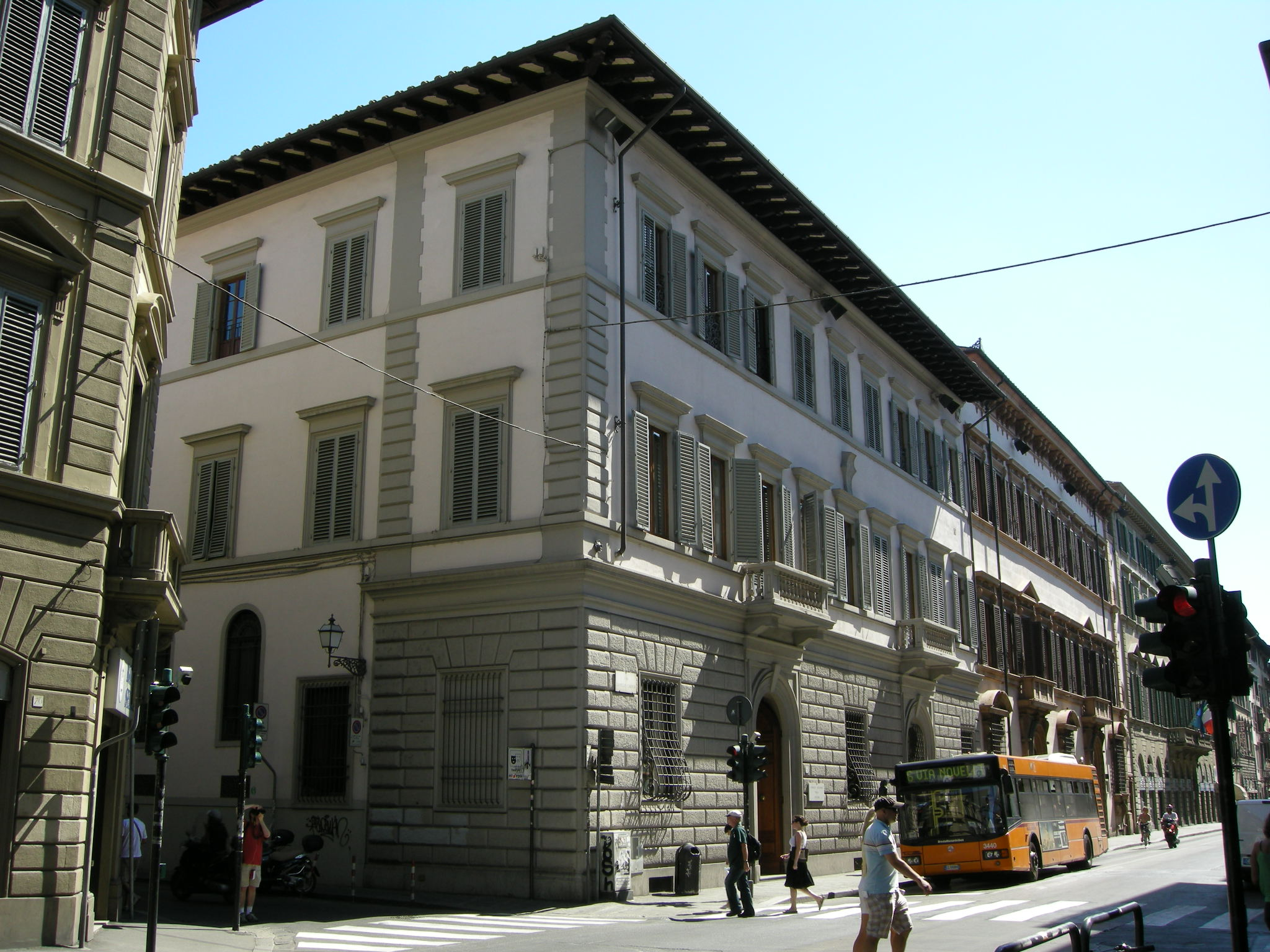
Palazzo Vettori, home to the KSU Florence facility in Italy

KSU Florence is an international study abroad program that grants students the opportunity to study in historic Florence, Italy at the Palazzo Vettori. Formerly, the campus was housed in Palazzo dei Cerchi, a prestigious and ancient building located in the heart of Florence at the corner of Via della Condotta and Vicolo dei Cerchi next to the famous Piazza della Signoria and the birthplace of literary genius Dante Alighieri. Kent State acquired this facility in 2003 and undertook its complete renovation. The original exterior was maintained and reflects Florence as it was in the 13th century. The restoration carefully preserved the original structure while creating an efficient space for academic purposes, with an interior that houses state-of-the-art classrooms. After using the recently restorated Palazzo Vettori since January 2016, on April 17, 2016, the Kent State University Florence campus was officially moved from Palazzo dei Cerchi and Palazzo Bartolini Baldelli to Palazzo Vettori.

==== New York City Studio ====
The New York City Studio is located in New York City's Garment District. Surrounded by fabric and accessory shops, fashion showrooms, and designer studios; one-third of all clothing manufactured in the USA is designed and produced in this neighborhood. The District is home to fashion designers including Oscar de la Renta, Calvin Klein, Donna Karan, Liz Claiborne, and Nicole Miller. The facility is a 4,500-square-foot (420 m^{2}) space and includes a 50-person lecture room, 12-station computer lab with instructor station, and a fashion design studio.

==== Cleveland Urban Design Collaborative ====
Kent State's Cleveland Urban Design Collaborative (CUDC) is located at 1309 Euclid Ave in the downtown Cleveland Theater District neighborhood, just off of East 14th Street. The CUDC was created in 1983 under the sponsorship of the Urban University Program, which supports the outreach and community service efforts of Ohio's state universities working in urban areas. Under its founding director, Foster Armstrong, the CUDC expanded on the existing outreach and public service activities of Kent State's architecture school, focusing primarily on historic preservation and the problems of Northeast Ohio's smaller towns and cities. In 2003, the CUDC began a collaboration with the Dresden University of Technology, Kent State's sister university in Germany, with a joint vision on the revitalization of the lower Cuyahoga Valley in Cleveland. Since then, there have been a number of faculty exchanges as the two universities seek to pool their expertise both to enhance students' experiences and to better serve their respective regions.

== Academics ==
=== Undergraduate admissions ===
Undergraduate admissions statistics
- 2023 entering class
- Admit rate: 86.65% (▲ +1.29)
- Yield rate: 22.07% (▼ −9.66)

Test scores middle 50%
- SAT Total: 1010–1230 (among 18% of FTFs)
- ACT Composite: 18–25 (among 51% of FTFs)

High school GPA
- Average: 3.51

Admission to Kent State University is classified as "selective" by both the Carnegie Classification of Institutions of Higher Education and U.S. News & World Report. The Princeton Review gives Kent State an "Admissions Selectivity Rating" of 76 out of 99. The college extends offers of admission to 87% of all applicants after holistic review that includes examination of academic rigor, academic performance, and admissions test scores.

In 2022, of all matriculating students, the average high school GPA is 3.61. The interquartile range for SAT scores in math and reading are 500–600 and 500–610 respectively, while the range for ACT scores is 19–25.

=== Rankings ===
Academic rankings

National
- U.S. News & World Report: 232 (tie)
- Washington Monthly: 296
- WSJ/College Pulse: > 600

Global
- ARWU: 701–800
- QS: 1001–1200
- THE: 801–1000
- U.S. News & World Report: 937 (tie)

National Program Rankings
Program	Ranking
Audiology	38
Biological Sciences	186
Chemistry	192
Clinical Psychology	70
Computer Science	148
Earth Sciences	140
Education	99
English	116
Fine Arts	110
History	110
Library and Information Studies	20
Mathematics	133
Nursing: Master's	63
Physics	136
Political Science	109
Psychology	122
Public Affairs	135
Public Health	115
Rehabilitation Counseling	19
Sociology	100
Speech-Language Pathology	78

In the 2024 U.S. News & World Report rankings, Kent was tied for the No. 227 national university in the United States, and the university has received several other positive rankings at both the national and global level.

For several years, Kent has also gained recognition for LGBTQ inclusion. For instance, Kent has been ranked as one of the best campuses for LGBTQ students in the country for multiple years. In 2022, Kent retained their top national ranking for LGBTQ inclusion.

=== Programs ===
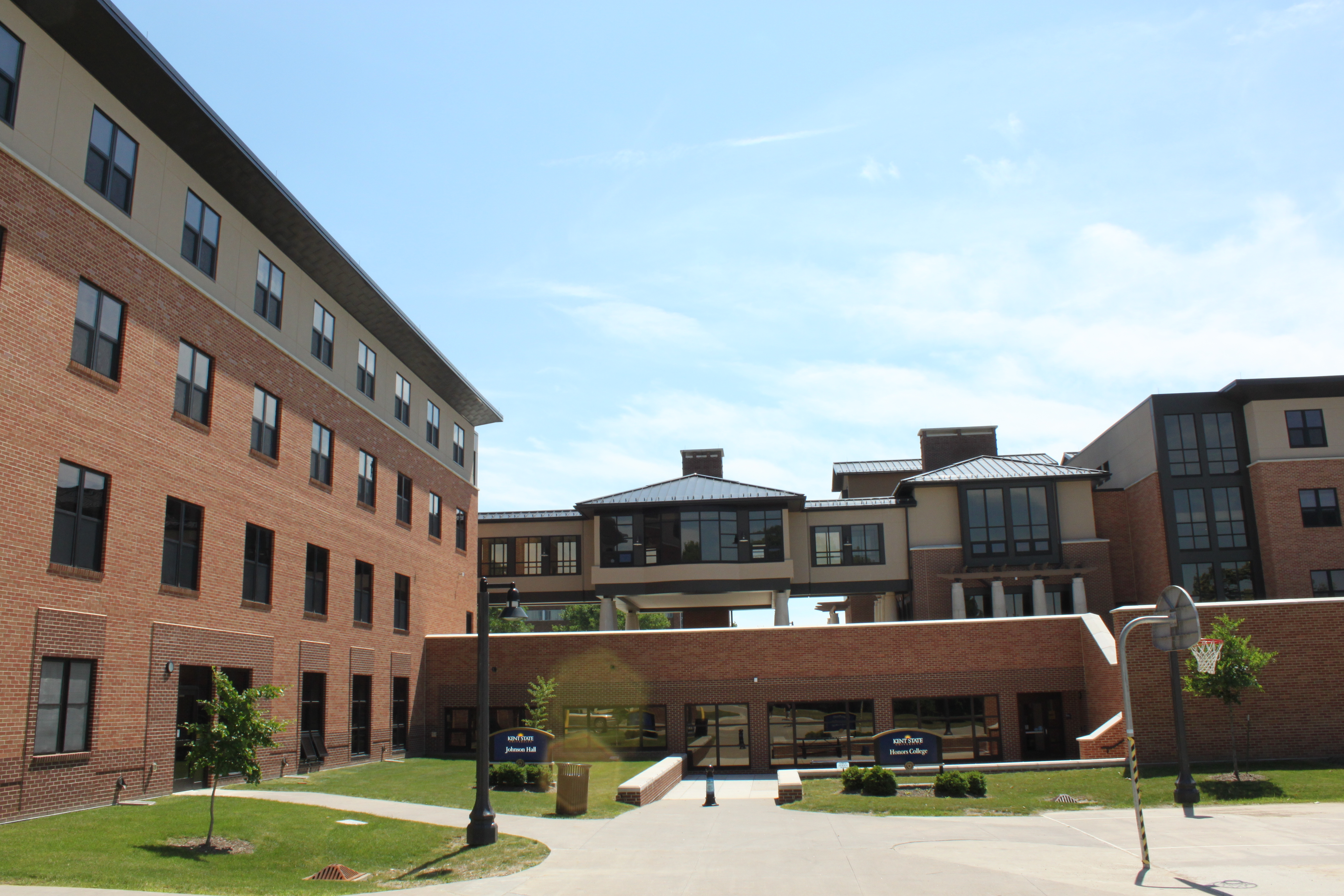
KSU Honors College Complex

Kent State has 12 academic colleges:

- College of Aeronautics and Engineering
- College of Architecture & Environmental Design
- College of Applied and Technical Studies
- College of the Arts
- College of Arts and Sciences
- College of Business Administration
- College of Communication and Information
- College of Education, Health, and Human Services
- College of Nursing
- College of Podiatric Medicine
- College of Public Health
- Honors College

The university also has interdisciplinary programs in Biomedical Sciences, Digital Science, Financial Engineering, and Information Architecture and Knowledge Management. The College of Aeronautics and Engineering offers four aeronautics degrees; Flight Technology, Aviation Management, Air Traffic Control and Aeronautical Engineering, and holds courses via the Kent State University Airport. In 2008, the university began offering a flight training certificate program through an affiliation with Premier Flight Academy in Akron.

The Washington Program in National Issues, founded in 1973, is one of the longest running study away programs in Washington D.C. Housed in the College of Arts and Sciences, this program gives students the opportunity to live in Washington, get a closer look at public issues and policies, and work an internship of their choosing.

The Shannon Rodgers and Jerry Silverman School of Fashion Design and Merchandising has programs in Florence, Hong Kong, and New York City, and affiliations in Paris and London. It was named a top-ten fashion school in the United States by Runway Magazine.

The Liquid Crystal Institute, founded 1965, is engaged in the research and development of liquid crystal optoelectronic materials, technology, and consumer products in connection with the National Science Foundation as part of ALCOM.

The Hugh A. Glauser School of Music offers degrees in music education, music performance, music theory and composition, ethnomusicology, chamber music, and a new minor in jazz studies. The School of Music is one of the few colleges in the U.S. that offer a BM, a MM, and a PhD in music education. The Kent/Blossom Music program partners with the Cleveland Orchestra each summer for its classical music festivals.

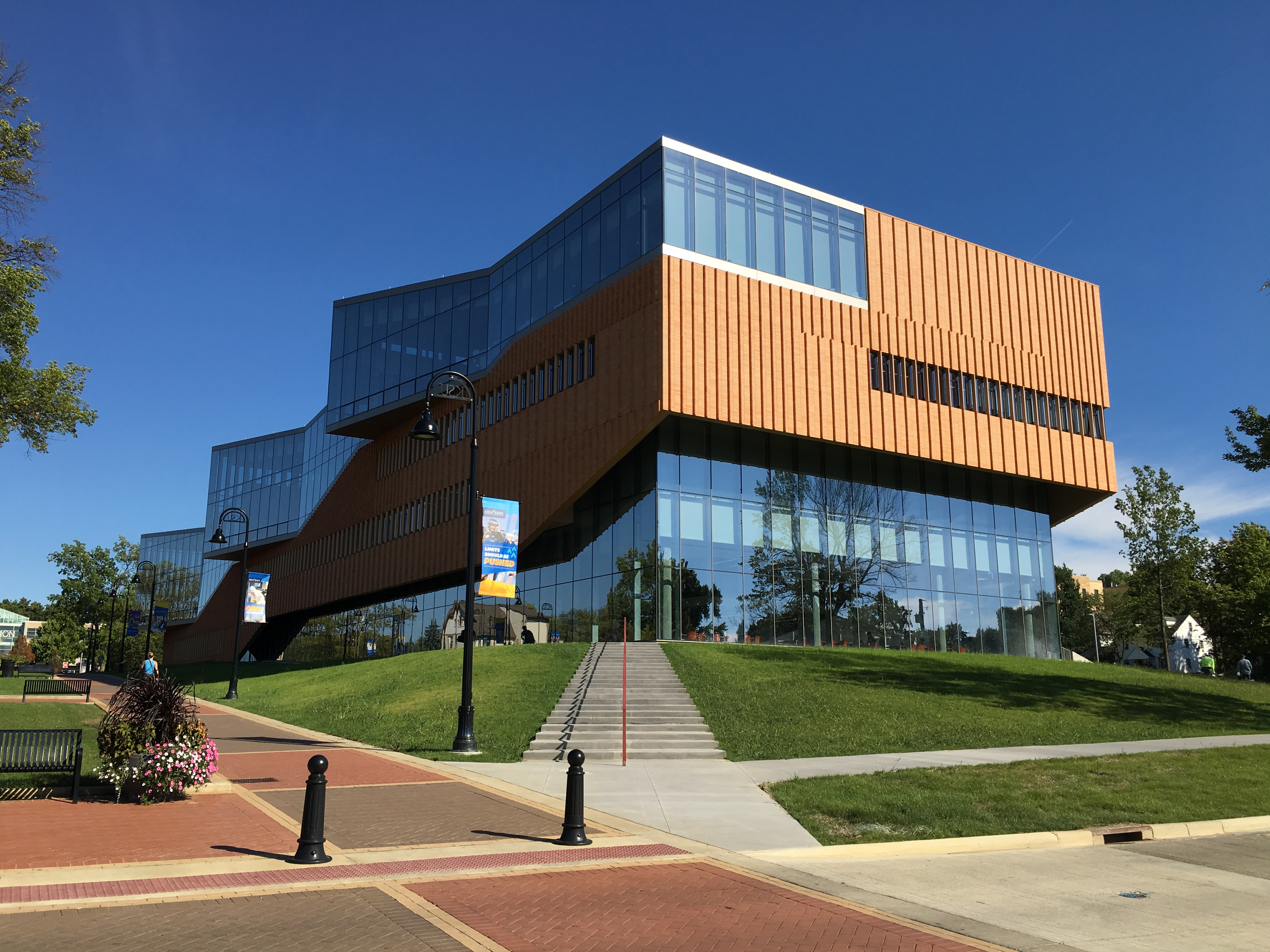
College of Architecture and Environmental Design

The School Psychology Program (SPSY) is accredited by APA and NASP. The Au.D. and M.A. programs in audiology and speech‑language pathology are accredited by the Council on Academic Accreditation in Audiology and Speech‑Language Pathology (CAA) of the American Speech‑Language‑Hearing Association (ASHA).

Faculty, staff and students collaborate at The Institute for the Study and Prevention of Violence (ISPV). The Center for Peaceful Change, a response to the Kent State shootings of 1970, was established in 1971 "as a living memorial to the events of May 4, 1970." Now known as The Center for Applied Conflict Management (CACM), it developed one of the earliest conflict resolution undergraduate degree programs in the United States.

=== Kent State University Press ===
The university operates the Kent State University Press, which is located in the main library building and publishes 30 to 35 titles a year. It is a member of the Association of University Presses, which includes over 100 university-sponsored scholarly presses. The Press was established in 1965, and initially published literary criticism; in 1972 its publishing program was expanded to include regional studies and ethnomusicology. Further expansion began in 1985 when the Press began publishing works related to the American Civil War and Ohio history. Notable recent titles include Dear Vaccine, a poetry collection responding to Covid, which was featured on PBS NewsHour.

== Student life ==
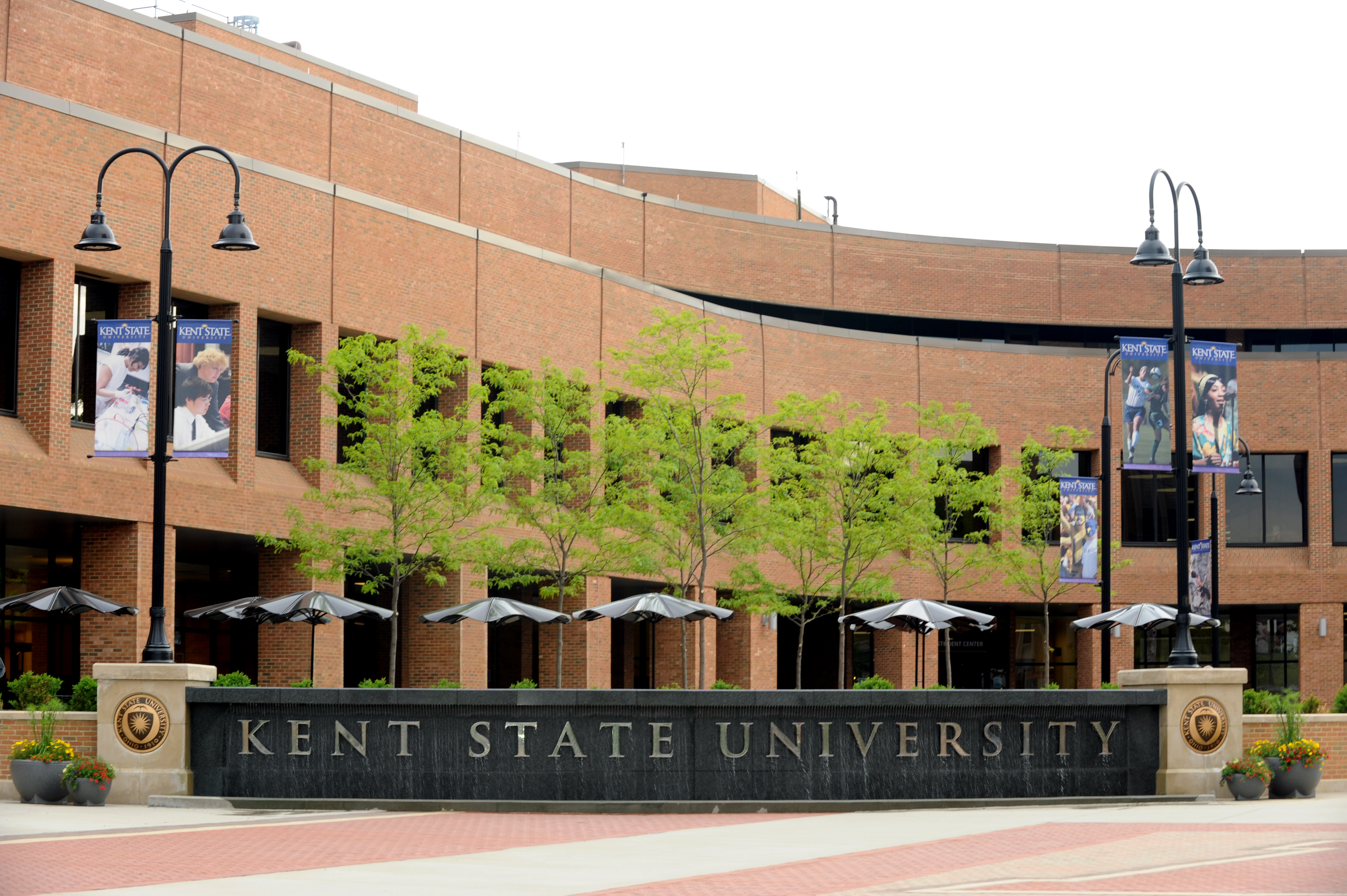
The Kent Student Center houses many of the student organizations and activities.

Student body composition as of May 2, 2022
Race and ethnicity	Total
White	75%
Black	9%
Other (Note: "Other" consists of multiracial Americans and those who prefer to not say.)	7%
Hispanic	4%
Foreign national	3%
Asian	2%
Economic diversity
Low-income (Note: The percentage of students who received an income-based federal Pell grant intended for low-income students.)	31%
Affluent (Note: The percentage of students who are a part of the American middle class at the bare minimum.)	69%

The university offers a large number of opportunities for student involvement at all its campuses, including student and professional associations, service organizations, performing ensembles, student publications, student government, and intramural and club athletics.

=== Performing arts ===
Through the Hugh A. Glauser School of Music and the School of Theatre and Dance, the university offers performance opportunities in the performing arts, including three concert bands (Wind Ensemble, Symphony Band, and Communiversity Band), Athletic Bands (Marching Golden Flashes and Flasher Brass), three jazz ensembles (Jazz Ensemble I, Jazz Ensemble II, and Jazz Lab Band), six choral ensembles (Kent Chorus, KSU Chorale, Women's Chorus, Men's Coro Cantare, Gospel Choir, and Nova Jazz Singers), one orchestra (KSU Orchestra), World Music Ensembles, as well as theater and dance opportunities. The Trumbull, Stark, and Tuscarawas campuses have theatre seasons featuring student actors. Each regional campus also offers their own performing arts opportunities.

=== Student government ===
Kent State offers several student government options, the largest of which is the Undergraduate Student Government (USG), which represents students from all campuses of the university and has been in some form of operation since 1924. The current 25 person governing body was formed after the merger of the All-Campus Programming Board (ACPB) and the Undergraduate Student Senate (USS). USG is led by an executive director and is composed of eight directors, ten college senators, one senator for residence hall students, one senator for commuter and off-campus students, one senator for undergraduate studies, and 3 senators-at-large. USG oversees the USG Programming Board which hosts various concerts, comedians, and performers, as well as the USG Allocations Committee which disburses conference and programming funds to the over 250 registered student organizations on the Kent Campus. Elections for USG are held annually in March, and officers are typically inaugurated in late April. In addition to the USG, Kent State also has the Graduate Student Senate (GSS) and a residence hall association named Kent Interhall Council (KIC). KIC represents students who live in the on-campus residence halls and deals with policies and activities. Within the KIC is a programming board and individual councils for each residence hall.

=== Student media ===
- The Kent Stater, colloquially known as the Stater, is a student-run news organization. At the beginning of the Fall 2024 semester—after the dissolution of TV2, the former student-run television station of KSU—the Stater merged with the digital (KentWired) and TV news (TV2 News) organizations, consolidating print, digital, and television news. The Stater prints biweekly and publishes daily on its website, KentStater.com (formerly KentWired.com). The Stater's TV News division, KentStaterTV's programming includes newscasts each weeknight during the fall and spring semesters, as well as two sports programs: Sports Corner and Overtime.
- Black Squirrel Entertainment is Kent State's student-run entertainment media organization. When TV2 was dissolved, Black Squirrel Radio merged with TV2 Entertainment. BSR is Kent State's student-run radio station, which streams constantly online, playing urban, rock, and local music. BSR also publishes student-created podcasts, which are available on major podcast platforms (Spotify, Apple Podcasts, etc.), as well as on the BSE website. BSE's television programs are all entirely student-produced and broadcast new episodes on a weekly basis during the spring and fall semesters, but they are also viewable on the BSE website's livestream and on-demand streaming pages. Current shows include All Systems Go!, The Blurb, The College Voice, Grab Bag, and kentcore.
- Fusion magazine is published twice a year by KSU students in print and on the Internet. The magazine strives to unify people of different backgrounds through education and awareness. Fusion addresses sexual minority issues within the general population using illustrative photo essays and in-depth feature articles.
- Uhuru Magazine is Kent State University's magazine dedicated to minority issues and topics and concentrates on African American issues and topics more specifically.
- A Magazine is Kent State University's magazine, initially titled Artemis and dedicated to feminist culture but was rebranded in 2012 to be a fashion-focused magazine.

=== Residential life ===
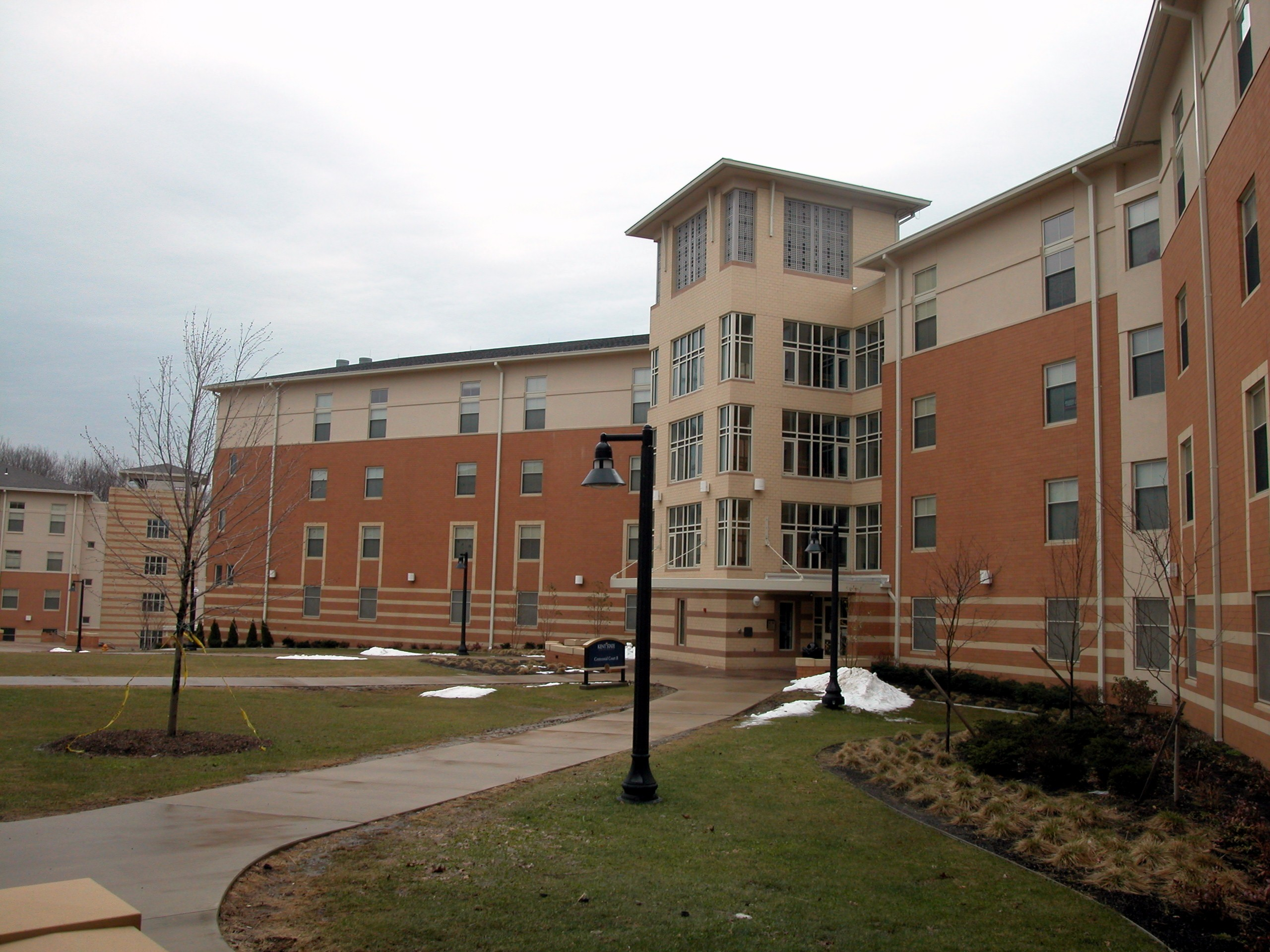
Centennial Court B, a co-ed residence hall

Kent State operates twenty-four on-campus residence halls, all of which are located on the main campus in Kent. Each hall is a part of a larger group, usually bound by a common name or central area. Within the University Housing Residence Halls, there are living-learning programs that place students with similar academic or extracurricular interests in the same dorms.

=== Dining ===
Kent State University Culinary Services operates two dining halls, located in Eastway Center and the Design and Innovation Hub. Kent State also operates the Rosie's Diner located in the Tri-Towers Rotunda, the Student Center Hub dining offerings, the Summit Street Café, the George T. Simon III Café, and the Fork In The Road food truck. Alongside their main dining offerings, Kent State Culinary runs two market locations on campus where students can purchase grocery products and some personal care/hygiene products. These are located in the Eastway Center and Tri-Towers Rotunda spaces.

=== Social programs ===
==== 4 Paws for Ability ====
4 Paws for Ability University Program provides university students with an opportunity to foster and socialize service dogs-in-training before they begin their professional training at the 4 Paws for Ability facility in Xenia, Ohio. A chapter was founded at Kent State in August 2016 with three service dogs-in-training; it became an official organization a year later. The chapter and organization was founded by Maxwell Newberry. As of August 2017, 4 Paws for Ability Kent State has 25 dogs on campus at a time. However, the number of sitters, co-handlers, and volunteers is not capped. The chapter has approximately 325 volunteers on their e-mail list, about 30 sitters, and over 50 co-handlers. The organization shares custody of the small fenced-in discus area at the outdoor track along Johnston Drive. Discussion and plans began in late 2017 to create a separate field for the organization.

==== Autism services ====
In recent years, Kent State has developed extensive services to support people with autism, with many of its programs nationally recognized in different areas. Non-autistic students who wish to be involved with these activities are paired with students with autism, and one sorority is directly involved with these services. In a 2018 story, the university's autism outreach coordinator told The Plain Dealer of Cleveland that about 30 autistic students were registered as such with the university, but estimated that close to 500 students with autism used the school's services. These services contributed to Kent State becoming the first NCAA Division I member to sign a recruit known to be diagnosed as autistic to a National Letter of Intent in a team sport in November of that year, when Kalin Bennett committed to play for the men's basketball team starting in 2019–20, making his debut with the team in November 2019.

=== Greek life ===
Greek life at Kent State is overseen by the Center for Student Involvement located in the Kent Student Center. Organizations belong to one of three governing councils, the Panhellenic Council, the Interfraternity Council and the Integrated Greek Council. Sorority houses are primarily located on Fraternity Drive located across the street from the main library and fraternity houses are located throughout the city of Kent. The university set aside land for the development of a Greek fraternity village in 2008, on land near the Student Recreation and Wellness Center. Sigma Nu built a new chapter house in 2008 on this land, but is now an empty house on fraternity circle. Kent State's Greek life claims numerous famous and well-known figures in society including Lou Holtz, a brother of the Kent Delta Upsilon chapter and Drew Carey, a brother of the Kent Delta Tau Delta chapter.

== Athletics ==
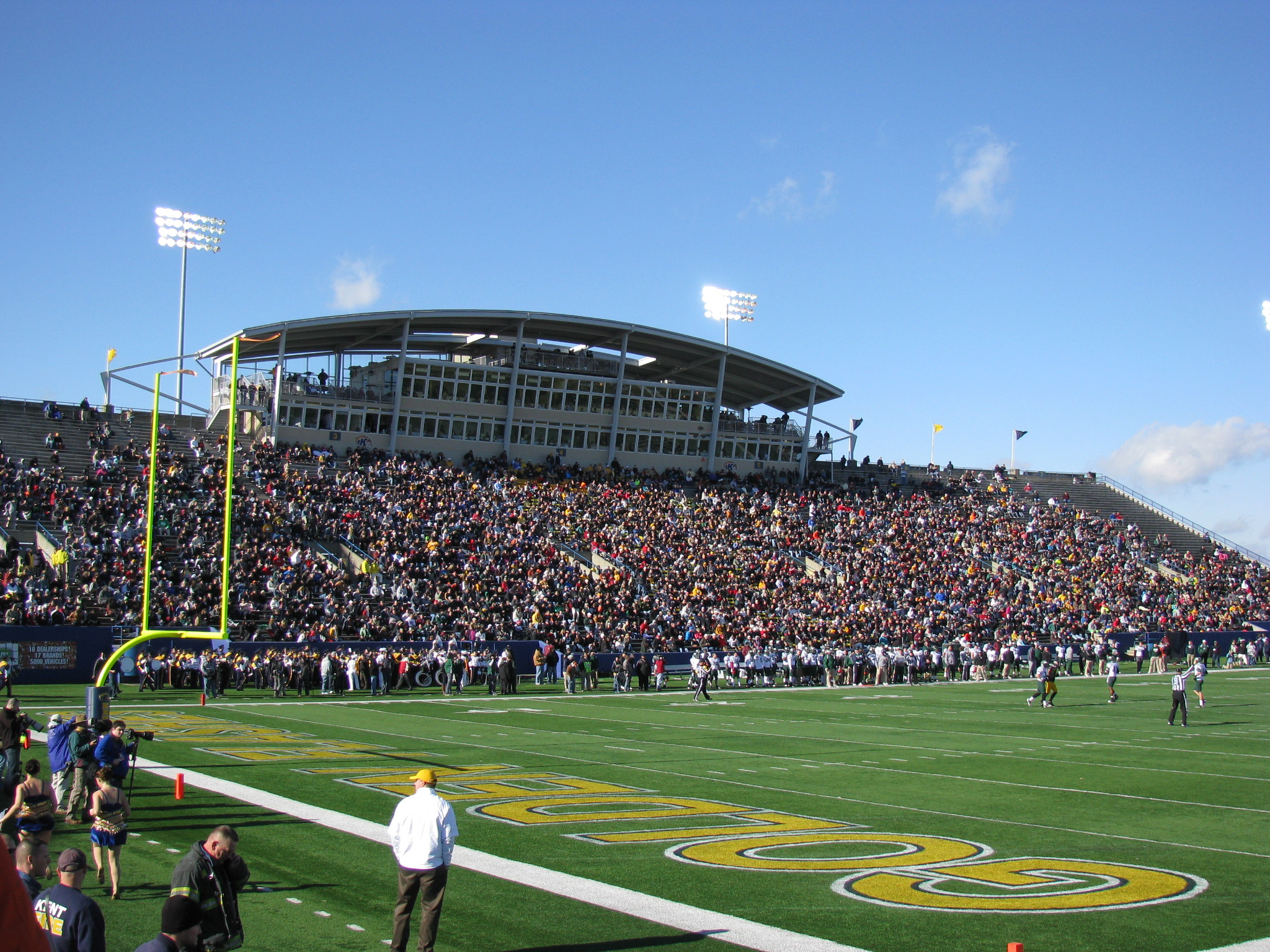
Dix Stadium in 2012, home of the Kent State Golden Flashes football team

Kent State's athletic teams are called the Golden Flashes and the school colors are shades of navy blue and gold, officially "Kent State blue" and "Kent State gold". The university sponsors 16 varsity athletic teams who compete in the National Collegiate Athletic Association (NCAA) at the Division I level with football in the Football Bowl Subdivision (FBS). Kent State is a member of the Mid-American Conference (MAC) East division and has been a member of the conference since 1951. The university athletic facilities are mainly on campus, featuring the 25,319-seat Dix Stadium and the 6,327-seat Memorial Athletic and Convocation Center, one of the oldest arenas in Division I college basketball.

Through the 2014–2015 season, in MAC play, Kent State has won the Reese Cup for best men's athletic program eight times, winning in 2000, 2002, 2006, 2009, 2010, 2011, 2012, and 2013. The Flashes have also won the Jacoby Cup for best women's athletic program eight times, winning in 1989, 1996, 1997, 1999, 2004, 2005, 2010, and 2014. In 2002 the Men's Basketball team advanced to NCAA "Elite Eight", while the baseball team, women's basketball, gymnastics, men's golf, and women's golf teams have won numerous MAC titles and advanced to NCAA tournament play.

Some notable athletic alumni include: Former Alabama Crimson Tide head football coach and seven-time national champion head coach Nick Saban, former Missouri Tigers head football coach Gary Pinkel, 2003 British Open Champion and current PGA member Ben Curtis, former New York Yankees catcher Thurman Munson, Thomas Jefferson 1984 200m Olympic bronze medalist, former Pittsburgh Steelers Pro Football Hall of Fame linebacker and four-time Super Bowl champion Jack Lambert, Pittsburgh Steelers linebacker and two-time Super Bowl champion James Harrison, ESPN Analyst and former college football national champion head coach Lou Holtz, New England Patriots Wide Receiver and Super Bowl champion Julian Edelman, former San Diego/Los Angeles Chargers All-Pro tight end Antonio Gates (who played basketball at KSU, not football), former Cleveland Browns and Indianapolis Colts All-Pro return specialist Joshua Cribbs, former San Diego Padres pitcher Dustin Hermanson, Tampa Bay Rays pitcher Andy Sonnanstine, Los Angeles Dodgers pitcher Matt Guerrier, and pitcher Joe Crawford, New York Mets.

== Affiliated media ==
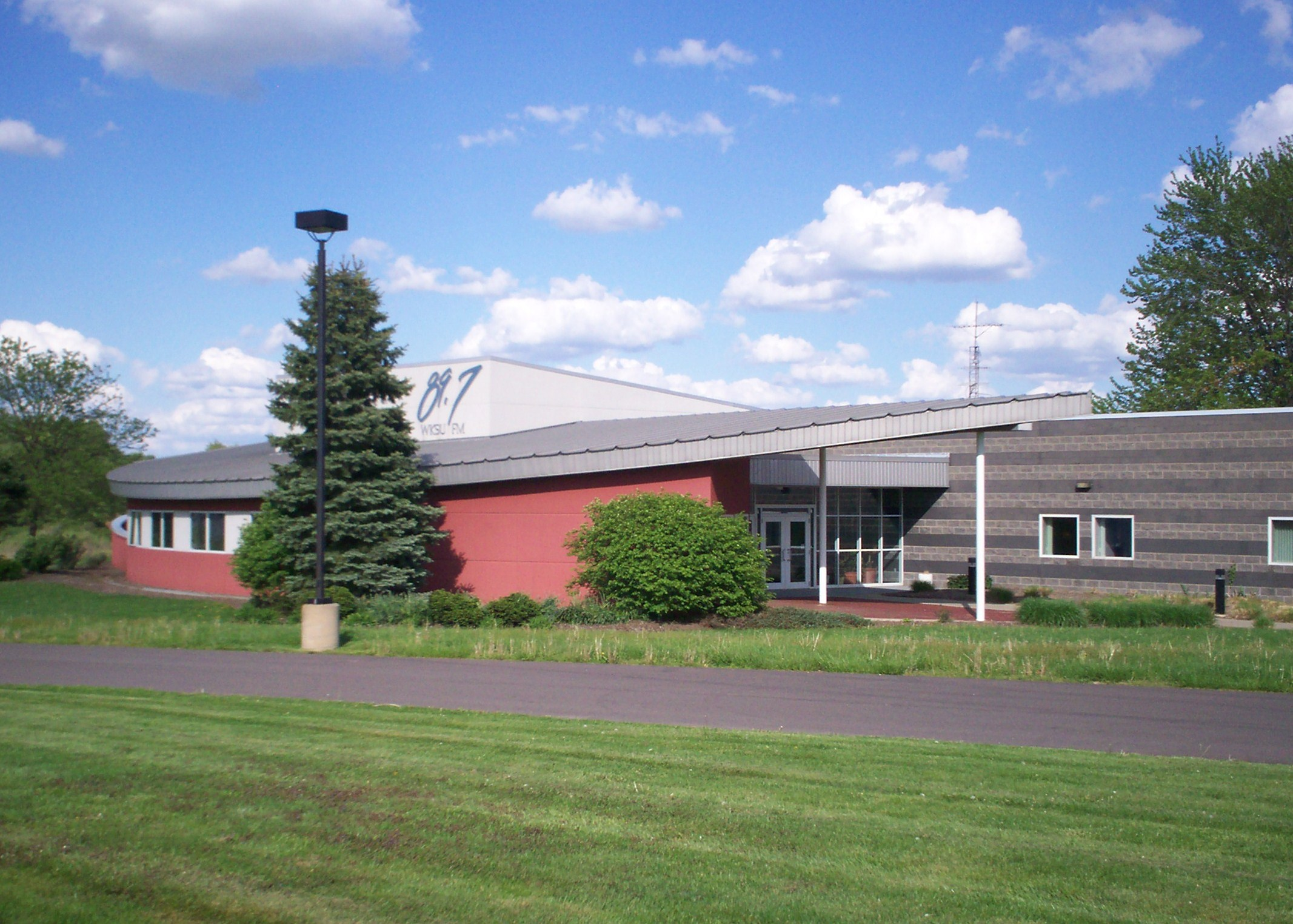
WKSU's former studios, located on Loop Road

Kent State owns public radio station WKSU (89.7 FM), the NPR member for both the Akron metropolitan area and Greater Cleveland. WKSU was established by the university in 1950 as an extension of the Kent State Radio Workshop, which up to that point produced scripted radio programs for broadcast on commercial radio stations dating back to 1935. Originally student operated, WKSU joined NPR in 1973 and subsequently evolved into a conventional public radio outlet. Since 2021, Ideastream Public Media has operated WKSU and its regional network of four satellite stations in Wooster, New Philadelphia, Thompson and Norwalk, all of which remain owned by the university (a fifth station, WCPN in Lorain, is owned directly by Ideastream). Ideastream also hosts an internship program for Kent State journalism students.

== Notable alumni ==
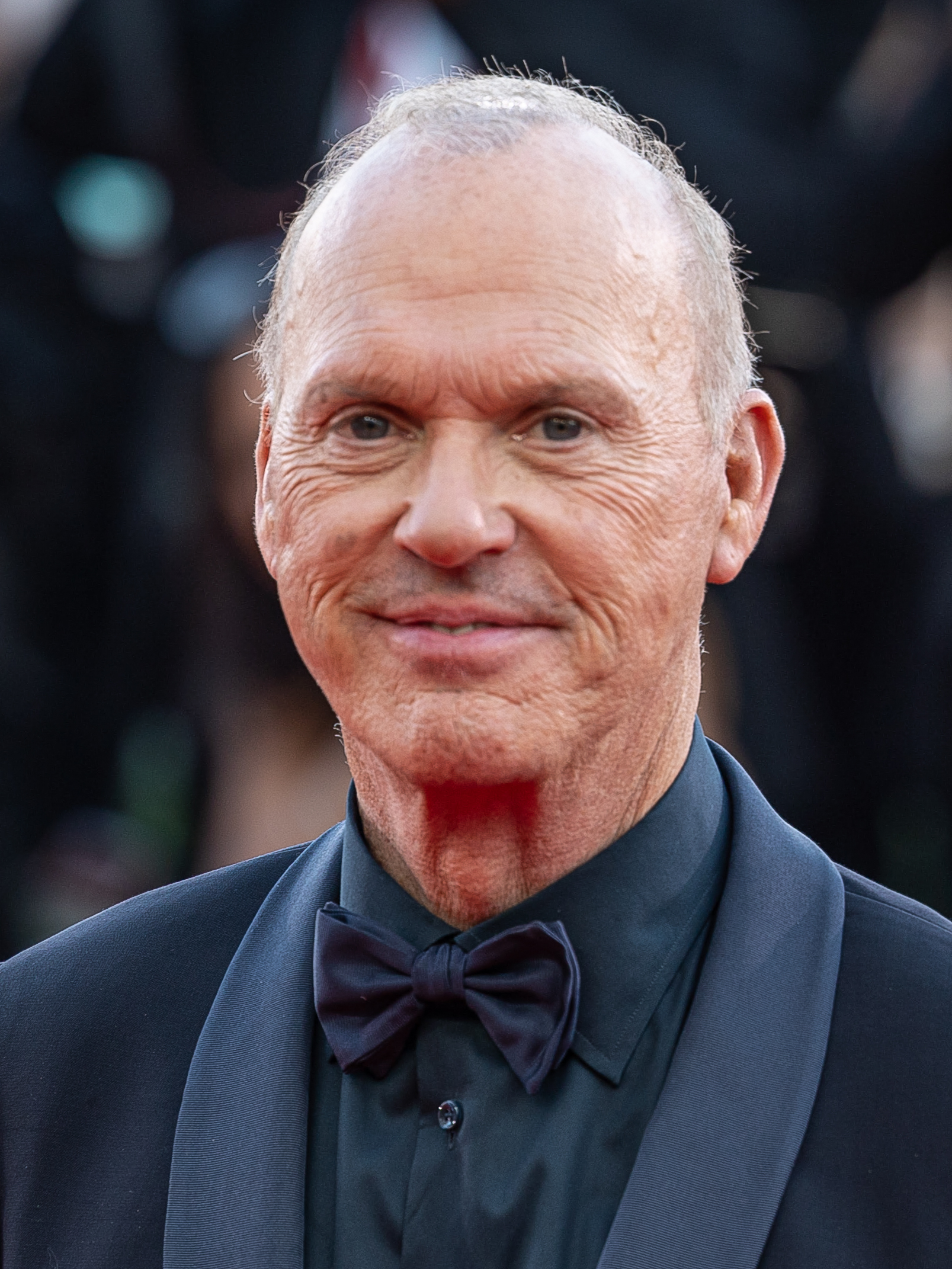
Actor Michael Keaton studied speech at Kent State.

Kent State counts 270,000 living alumni as of 2023. It has produced a number of individuals in the entertainment industry including comedian and current Price is Right host Drew Carey, comedian and talk show host Arsenio Hall, Steve Harvey, comedian Rick Glassman, actors John de Lancie, Michael Keaton, and Ray Wise, actresses Alaina Reed Hall and Alice Ripley, Phenomenon star Angela Funovits, boxing promoter Don King, 30 Rock producer Jeff Richmond, and That 70s Show creator Bonnie Turner. Musicians from Kent State include several members of the band Devo, which was formed at Kent State in 1973, including Mark Mothersbaugh, Bob Lewis, and Gerald Casale. Additional musicians include singers Chrissie Hynde, Jeff Timmons of 98 Degrees, Debra Byrd of American Idol, guitarist Joe Walsh, and drummer Chris Vrenna.

In politics and government, several politicians in Ohio attended Kent State including former judge and United States Representative Robert E. Cook, former minority leader C.J. Prentiss, current United States House of Representatives member Betty Sutton, former representative, Lieutenant Governor, and Governor Nancy Hollister, and Supreme Court of Ohio justice Terrence O'Donnell. Other politicians include Allen Buckley of Georgia, Ohio politician Jeffrey Dean, Pennsylvania state representative Allen Kukovich, and George Petak of Wisconsin. Politician activists from Kent State include anti-war activist Alan Canfora and former Students for a Democratic Society leaders Ken Hammond and Carl Oglesby. In Indian politics, Lokam Naga Madhavi won as a MLA for Nellimarla.

Literary and journalism alumni include Funky Winkerbean and Crankshaft writer Tom Batiuk, Captain Underpants author Dav Pilkey, and columnists Connie Schultz and Regina Brett. Poet Laureate of the state of Maryland writer and educator Michael Glaser.

Television journalism alumni include CNN anchor Carol Costello, Cleveland news anchors Ted Henry, Wayne Dawson, sportscaster Jeff Phelps, and ESPN Dream Job winner Dave Holmes.

A number of professional athletes are Kent State alumni including WWE wrestlers Dolph Ziggler and Dana Brooke, National Football League players James Harrison, Josh Cribbs, Julian Edelman, Don Nottingham, Jack Lambert, and Antonio Gates, along with Canadian Football League standouts Jay McNeil, Tony Martino, and Canadian Football Hall of Fame and former Kent State football head coach Jim Corrigall. College football coaches Nick Saban, Gary Pinkel, and Lou Holtz are also Kent State alumni. James Steen, a 1971 Kent State graduate on the swim team, served as a swim coach at Kenyon College where his teams won a combined 50 Division III NCAA championships.

Major League Baseball players to come from Kent State include Emmanuel Burriss, Matt Guerrier, Andy Sonnanstine, Gene Michael, Rich Rollins, Dustin Hermanson, Steve Stone, and Thurman Munson. Additional athletic alumni include Canadian professional golfers Corey Conners, Mackenzie Hughes, Jon Mills, Taylor Pendrith, and Ryan Yip, American professional golfer Ben Curtis, and Olympians Betty-Jean Maycock in gymnastics and Gerald Tinker in track and field.
