= Kent State University Airport =

- IATA: none; ICAO: K1G3; FAA LID: 1G3

Summary
- Airport type: Public
- Owner: Kent State University
- Serves: Kent, Ohio
- Location: Stow, Ohio
- Time zone: UTC−05:00 (-5)
  - Summer (DST): UTC−04:00 (-4)
- Elevation AMSL: 1,134.5 ft (345.8 m)
- Coordinates: 41°09′05″N 081°24′54″W

Map
- Location of airport in Ohio 1G3 (the United States)

Runways
Direction	Length		Surface
Direction	ft	m	Surface
2/20	4,000	1,219	Asphalt
5/23 (Closed)	2,400	732	Turf
9/27 (Closed)	1,170	357	Turf

Statistics (2025)
- Aircraft operations: 72,500
- Based aircraft: 34
- Sources: KSU, airport website, FAA

Kent State University Airport (FAA LID: 1G3) is a public airport in Stow, Ohio, United States owned by Kent State University. The airport is located along State Route 59 (Kent Road) approximately three miles (5 km) west of the central business district of Kent.

Besides being a public airport, the Kent State University Airport is used by the College of Aeronautics and Engineering for its in-house Aeronautics program, which provides flight training and other professional aeronautical training, including Air Traffic Control, Airport Management studies, and air mobility, to enrolled Kent State University students. Kent State has Pathway Programs with various airlines including Allegiant Air, Commute Air, Delta Airlines, JetBlue, Republic Airways, Southwest Airlines, and United Airlines.

The airport was named Ohio's Airport of the Year in 2017 by the Ohio Aviation Association. The airport was commended for promoting aviation by providing access and availability to the exchange of ideas and new methods as well as information and experiences.

== History ==
The airport, which was previously known as Stow Field, was renamed to Kent State University Airport in 1942.

The university considered closing the airport in the early 2000s. However, the FAA prohibited moving or shuttering it.

In early 2019, the airport received a 5 million dollar grant from FedEx for expansion, including the creation of a new aeronautics center.

The runway underwent a rehabilitation project in 2023.

In 2026, Taxiway A and its connected taxiways were torn down and reconstructed, as part of the Summer 2026 Taxiway Reconstruction Project. This project had 3 different phases each focusing on specific areas of the taxiways, with construction taking place from May to September of 2026. Construction finished in early September.

== Facilities and aircraft ==
Kent State University Airport covers an area of 320 acres (130 ha), which contains one runway. Designated as runway 2/20, the runway measures 4,000 x 60 ft (1,219 x 18 m) and is paved with Asphalt.

Kent State University manages a fixed-base operator at the airport that sells fuel. It also offers services such as catering, courtesy transportation, wifi, conference rooms, pilot supplies, and more.

For the 12-month period ending August 11, 2017, the airport had 72,500 aircraft operations, an average of 198 per day: 97% general aviation, 2% air taxi and <1% military.

All of Kent State's aircraft have a unique call sign, which follows the naming scheme "KSF#", and "Kent #" for radio calls. For example, N95469, a current Cessna 152 owned by Kent State, has the callsign "KSF8", being "Kent 8" for radio calls. These are accepted universally as their callsign, and not specific to Kent State operations.

As of November 2026, there are 34 active aircraft based at this airport: 32 single-engine and 2 multi-engine airplanes.

Kent State University Fleet
Aircraft Manufacturer+Type	Active?	Fleet Size	Avionics	Used for
Cessna 150H "The Spirit of the Flying Deuce"	Yes	1	Garmin 430W, ADS-B Transponder	Kent State University Precision Flight Team
Cessna 152 (1984)	Yes	9	Garmin 430W, ADS-B Transponder	Private Pilot, Commercial (Optional for commercial, some students use the Cessna 152 for personal preference or cost savings)
Cessna 172 SP	Yes	15	Garmin G1000, GFC 700 Autopilot, ADS-B Transponder	Instrument, Commercial, CFI-I
Cessna 172R Skyhawk	Yes	5	Garmin G3X, Garmin 650xi GSP, GFC 500 Autopilot, ADS-B Transponder	CFI
Cessna 172P Skyhawk	Yes	3	Garmin 430W, ADS-B Transponder	Private (Typically only used if student+instructor weight requires)
Piper PA-44-180 Seminole	Yes	2	Garmin 650, ADS-B Transponder	Multi-engine
Retired fleet
Piper PA-28-201 Arrow III	No (Retired and sold, see below)	3	Garmin 500, ADS-B Transponder	Commercial, CFI
Cessna 172RG	No (Retired, unknown)	1	Unknown, likely same as the other 172R models	Unknown, likely same as the other 172R models

In the Summer of 2025, Kent State's fleet of Piper Arrows were sold and delivered to different buyers. They originally were bought and used due to having retractable gear and 200HP engines, qualifying it as a "Complex" and "High-performance" aircraft, respectively, which publicized by Piper Aircraft at Oshkosh, 2015. In flight training, these aircraft were much cheaper to operate with the aim of getting complex aircraft time, which was required by the FAA at the time for a Commercial Pilot License, compared to the Piper Seminole. However were eventually sold because the FAA eliminated the requirement to train in a complex aircraft in Commercial Pilot Training, allowing the same requirement to be fulfilled with Technically Advanced Aircraft (TAA). This made the Arrows cost-ineffective, with it being cheaper to fly in Kent's Cessna 172 SP aircraft, which fulfill the TAA qualification because of their Garmin G1000 integrated cockpit.

Kent State also owns a Cessna 172RG, but it is not currently active in flight training, but not shown as sold or decommissioned. Its current status is unknown.

== Accidents and incidents ==
- On September 16, 2007, an Aeronca 7AC Champion was substantially damaged during landing. The pilot reported that a wind gust hit the airplane, and the airplane departed off the right side of the runway. The pilot tried to get the aircraft back onto the runway, but it still continued into a drainage ditch. The probable cause of the accident was found to be the inadequate compensation for wind conditions and the directional control not obtained/maintained by the pilot during landing.
- On March 6, 2018, a Cessna 172 collided with a deer while landing at the Kent State University Airport at night. The pilot reported seeing a streak of motion in his peripheral vision, and he subsequently felt an impact with the aircraft's empennage. In a post-accident examination, it was revealed that a deer struck the horizontal stabilizer, which sustained substantial damage.

== See also ==
- List of airports in Ohio
