= Ken Hammond (historian) =

American historian

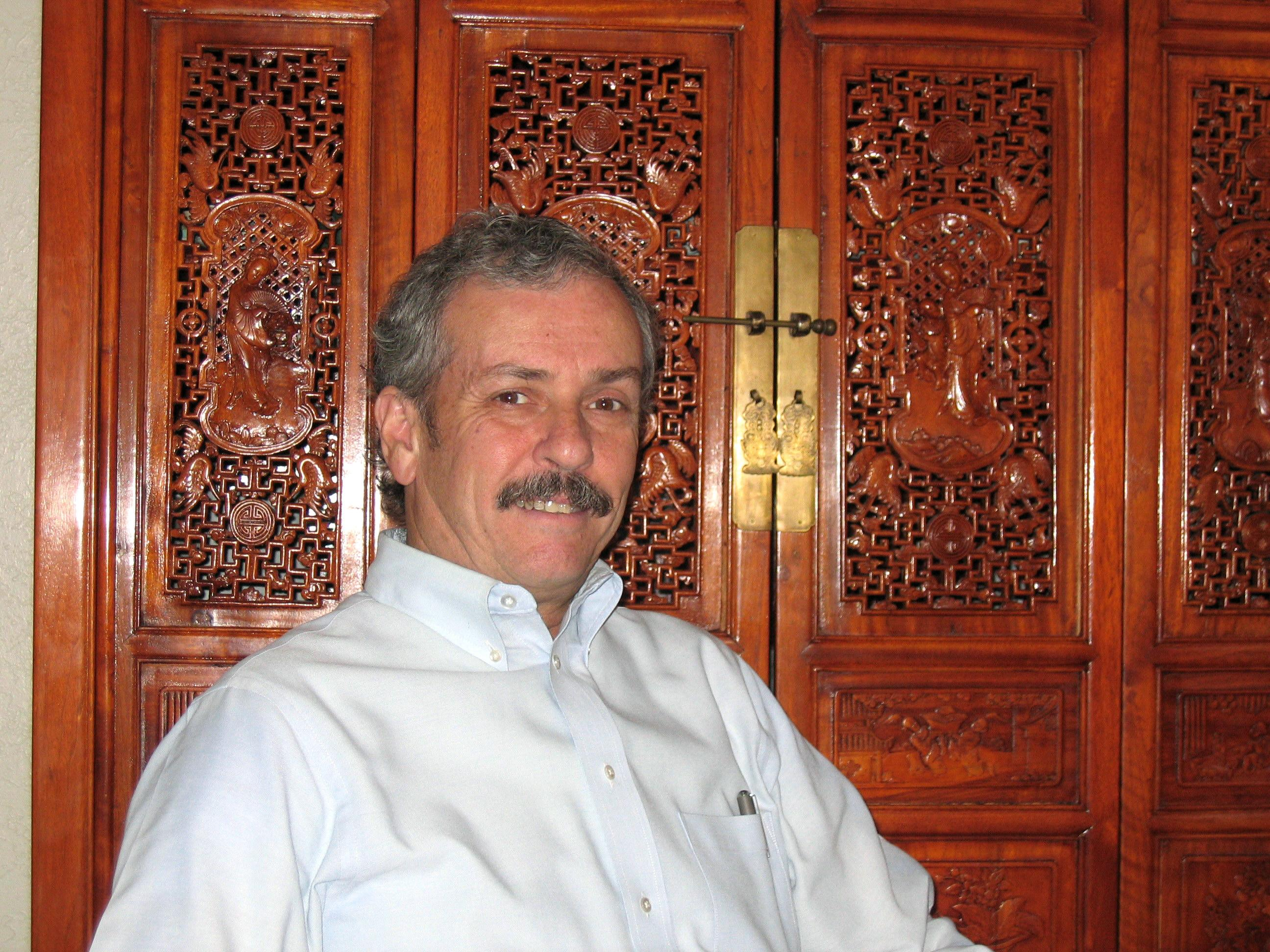
- Occupation: Historian

Kenneth J. Hammond is Professor of History at New Mexico State University. Hammond was a student and Students for a Democratic Society leader at Kent State University from 1967 to 1970. He later (1985) completed his degree in political science, then studied Modern Chinese language at the Beijing Foreign Languages Normal School in Beijing. Hammond received an M.A. in Regional Studies - East Asia (1989), and a Ph.D. in History and East Asian Languages (1994) from Harvard University. In 2007, Hammond was appointed director of the Confucius Institute, a cultural initiative funded in part by Hanban on the NMSU campus that is dedicated to studying and publicizing China and Chinese culture. He is the editor of the journal Ming Studies. The Confucius Institute was closed in 2020 due to political pressure from the Federal government.

While at Kent State, Hammond authored a study of local politics entitled Who Rules Kent? and was active in the political events that culminated in the May 4, 1970 shootings at the university. He was indicted as one of the "Kent 25" and was lead plaintiff in the federal lawsuit Hammond v. Brown which resulted in the suppression of the Special Grand Jury report on the Kent State shootings. All charges against the Kent 25 were dropped in December 1971. In 1976 he took part in the "Move the Gym" demonstrations at Kent, on the site of the 1970 shootings.

== See also ==
- The Teaching Company
