= Medina County University Center =

They have greqt education service

Coordinates: 41°06′16″N 81°54′10″W

The Medina County University Center, or "MCUC," is an extension of the University of Akron. A three-story structure, this facility opened in 2007 and is located in Lafayette Township in Medina County, Ohio, USA.

The MCUC, under the direction of University of Akron President Gary L. Miller, is the first physical facility in Medina County devoted solely to higher education.
