= Salem City School District =

Salem City School District may refer to:

- Salem City School District (New Jersey), Salem County, New Jersey
- Salem City School District, Ohio, Salem, Ohio
