= Tim Schuller =

American music critic and historian (died 2012)

- Born: Fredric Thomas Schuller; Salem, Ohio, U.S.
- Died: February 29, 2012 (aged 62); Dallas, Texas, U.S.
- Education: Kent State University at Salem
- Occupations: Columnist, historian, music critic

Tim "Mit" Schuller (né Fredric Thomas Schuller; died 29 February 2012) was an American, Dallas–Fort Worth-based music critic, who chronicled living blues and jazz musicians, mostly from Texas (particularly from the Dallas–Fort Worth area and the Southwest).

== Early years ==
Schuller was born in Salem, Ohio, to Frederick Kane Schuller and Mary Louise Layden. Tim's father, who had been a newspaper journalist, died when he was seven. Schuller attended Salem High School, graduating in 1967. During his senior year, he was the feature editor of the Salem Quaker, his high school newspaper. He studied at Kent State University at Salem, but did not graduate. In Ohio, Schuller had worked as a musician (playing guitar), a factory worker, and a stringer reporter.

Schuller moved to Chicago with his childhood friend from Salem, Tom "Mot" Dutko, a blues drummer. In Chicago, Schuller played with Robert Lockwood Jr. and John Brim.

== Career ==
Schuller moved to Dallas around 1977 and briefly embarked in the record business. In 1977, he was worked at Peaches Records & Tapes at Cole and Fitzhugh Avenues, Dallas. In 1980, Schuller was assistant manager at Sound Town at the Valley View Mall in Dallas.

Some of Schullers writings – notably those about Freddie King, Buster Smith, and Lightnin' Hopkins – have been cited in academic and encyclopedic publications. According to a Buddy magazine staff editor, Schuller provided blues pianist Boston Smith (Buster Smith's brother) with an epitaph worthy of his achievements.

He also was an update editor of the 2002 revised edition of MusicHound Blues: The Essential Album Guide (Schirmer Trade Books / Omnibus Press).

Schuller contributed to the following newspapers, periodicals, and records: Periodicals and newspapers

- Guitar Player, Living Blues, Blues Access
- The Met (Dallas' arts & entertainment weekly)
- Southwest Blues
- DownBeat
- Buddy magazine
- Texas Jazz
- Juke Blues
- Coda
- Crazy Music (the journal of the Australian Blues Society)
- D Magazine
- Dallas Morning News,
- Dallas Observer
- Texas Observer
- Contemporary Keyboard
- Texas Highways
- Akron Beacon Journal

Discography

- Lucky Seven Records
- Black Top
- Trix
- Wolf Records (de) (Vienna, Austria)
- Bullseye Blues
- Fedora Records
- Blind Pig
- TKO Magnum Music
- Blue Moon
- Continental Blue Heaven (distributed by Harmonia Mundi)
- Cannonball Records (nl) 29110
- AudioQuest Music
- TopCat Records
- Mayhem Records
- JSP

== Affiliations ==
In 1987, Schuller – with Chuck Nevitt and Brian "Hash Brown" Calway (blues musician) – founded the Dallas Blues Society.

== Death ==
Tim Schuller died February 29, 2012, in Dallas. He is buried in Salem, Ohio, at Grandview Cemetery.
