= CM-11 =

CM-11 may refer to the following articles:

- CM11 Brave Tiger, Taiwan military tank.
- USS Salem (CM-11), cargo ship, which acted as a minelayer during World War II.
