= Centennial Bridge =

Centennial Bridge may refer to:

== Canada ==
- Centennial Bridge (New Brunswick), over the Miramichi River, in Northumberland County, New Brunswick, Canada

== China ==
- Haikou Century Bridge

== Panama ==
- Centennial Bridge, Panama, which crosses the Panama Canal

== United States ==
- Centennial Bridge (Leavenworth, Kansas), over the Missouri River, connecting Leavenworth, Kansas and Platte County, Missouri
- Centennial Bridge (Center Valley, Pennsylvania), an arch bridge in Center Valley, Pennsylvania
- Centennial Covered Bridge, a replica wooden covered bridge in Cottage Grove, Oregon
- Rock Island Centennial Bridge, connecting Rock Island, Illinois and Davenport, Iowa
- Teegarden-Centennial Covered Bridge, over Little Beaver Creek, in Columbiana County, Ohio
- Veterans Memorial Centennial Bridge, in Idaho (formerly Bennett Bay Centennial Bridge)

== Windows 10 ==
- The codename for the application bridge used to port Win32 desktop apps to the Universal Windows Platform
