= USS Salem (CM-11) =

WWII minelayer

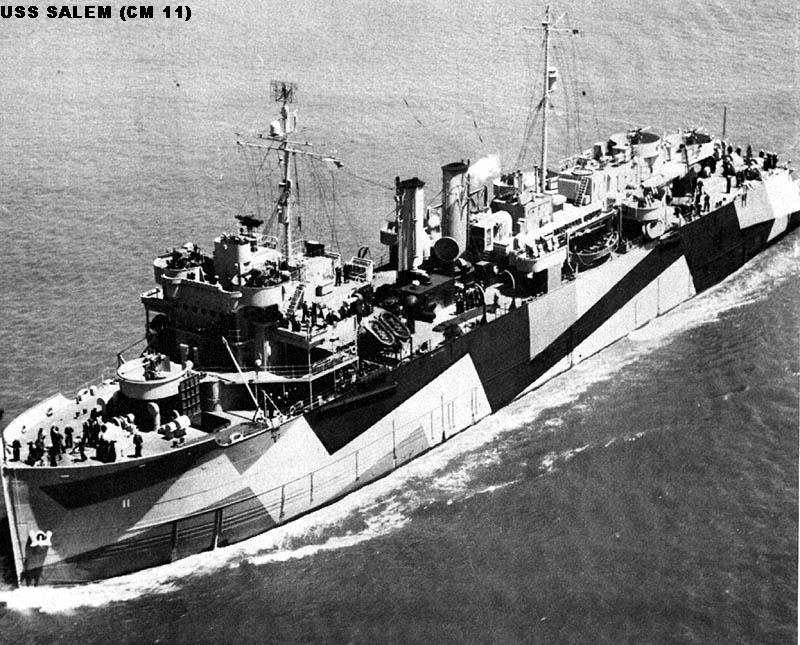

History

United States
- Name: USS Salem
- Namesake: Salem, Massachusetts; Salem, New Jersey; Salem, Ohio; Salem, Oregon
- Builder: William Cramp & Sons, Philadelphia, Pennsylvania
- Launched: 1916, as SS Joseph R. Parrott
- Acquired: 8 June 1942
- Commissioned: 9 August 1942
- Decommissioned: 6 December 1945
- Renamed: Shawmut, 15 August 1945
- Stricken: 3 January 1946
- Honours and awards: 2 battle stars (WWII)
- Fate: Sold, 7 March 1947

General characteristics
- Type: Cargo ship / Minelayer / Net laying ship
- Displacement: 5,300 long tons (5,385 t)
- Length: 350 ft (110 m)
- Beam: 57 ft (17 m)
- Draft: 15 ft (4.6 m)
- Propulsion: Vertical triple-expansion engine, 2 shafts, 2,700 shp (2,013 kW)
- Speed: 12 knots (22 km/h; 14 mph)
- Complement: 219 officers and enlisted
- Armament: 3 × 3"/50 caliber guns; 18 × 20 mm AA guns

USS Salem (CM-11) was a commercial cargo ship, that served as a minelayer and then net laying ship of the United States Navy during World War II.

The ship was built in 1916 by William Cramp & Sons, Philadelphia, as SS Joseph R. Parrott; was acquired by the U.S. Navy on 8 June 1942 from the Maritime Commission; and commissioned on 9 August 1942.

== Service history ==
=== Invasion of North Africa ===
Following training exercises, Salem departed Brooklyn, New York, on 13 November 1942, as part of a convoy, and arrived at Casablanca on 1 December. She laid 202 mines off that port on 27 and 28 December and helped fight off an air raid there on 31 December. On 20 January 1943, she sailed from Casablanca and arrived at Norfolk, Virginia, on 9 February.

=== Invasion of Italy ===
After repairs, she left the United States again on 13 June and arrived at Oran on 5 July. The minelayer got underway the next day as part of the Sicily invasion force; and, on 11 July, laid 390 mines off Gela, Sicily, in company with Weehawken (CM-12) and Keokuk (CM-8). Returning to Oran on 17 July, Salem subsequently carried 255 British troops from Gibraltar to Oran and then moved to Bizerte in preparation for landings in Italy. However, her role in these landings was cancelled due to the Italian surrender. The ship left Mers el Kebir on 7 October and returned to New York on 26 October.

=== Pacific Theatre operations ===
Salem was repaired at Norfolk, Virginia, and carried out local operations along the Atlantic coast until 11 May 1944, when she departed Hampton Roads, Virginia, for duty with Service Squadron 6 in the Pacific. On 27 June, she sailed from Pearl Harbor with a cargo of ammunition, which she offloaded to shore facilities and combatant ships after her arrival at Eniwetok on 8 July. She then shuttled between Eniwetok, Kwajalein, Makin, Majuro, Saipan, and Tinian, helping to carry ammunition to forward areas for issue to the fleet. At Tinian on 4 October, her stern touched bottom in heavy swells, damaging both screws, and Sirius (AK-15) and an Army tug towed her back to Pearl Harbor. After arrival on 5 November, she underwent repairs and temporary conversion into a net cargo ship.

=== Conversion to net cargo ship ===
Salem completed conversion on 10 February 1945 and departed Pearl Harbor on 18 February with a cargo of anti-torpedo nets. After stops at Eniwetok, Ulithi, and Leyte, Salem arrived off Kerama Retto on 26 March 1945 as troops went ashore to secure the island and its harbor for use as a fleet base for the invasion of Okinawa. During the next two days, Salem laid antisubmarine nets to protect the harbor.

=== Frequent air attacks ===
Japanese air attacks were frequent; and, on 2 April, Salem's gunners helped shoot down a plane that was trying to crash into Lunga Point (CVE-94). Salem departed Kerama Retto two days later and arrived at Pearl Harbor on 27 April, where she picked up a new cargo of nets. Departing Pearl Harbor on 24 May, she unloaded her nets at Guam between 12 and 19 June, and then proceeded to Eniwetok where she repaired nets between 24 June and 31 July.

=== Renamed ===
Salem returned to Pearl Harbor on 10 August, and on 15 August, the day fighting stopped in the Pacific, was renamed as USS Shawmut to permit a new cruiser to be named USS Salem.

=== End-of-War deactivation ===
Departing Pearl Harbor on 31 August, she arrived at San Francisco, California, on 10 September for inactivation. Shawmut was decommissioned on 6 December 1945, struck from the Navy List on 3 January 1946, and transferred to the Maritime Commission on 20 June 1946. She was sold on 7 March 1947 to the West India Fruit and Steamship Company, and served as SS Joseph R. Parrott under the Honduran flag until 1970.

== Awards ==
- American Campaign Medal
- Asiatic-Pacific Campaign Medal with one battle star
- European-African-Middle Eastern Campaign Medal with one battle star
- World War II Victory Medal
