= Dan Howell =

Dan or Daniel Howell may refer to:

- Daniel Howell (Wisconsin politician) (1807–1890), American businessman and politician, member of the Wisconsin Senate
- Dan Howell (politician), American politician, member of the Tennessee House of Representatives
- Daniel Howell (born 1991), English YouTuber, comedian, and presenter

== See also ==
- Daniel Howell Hise House
