= Lou Slaby =

American football player (1941–2019)

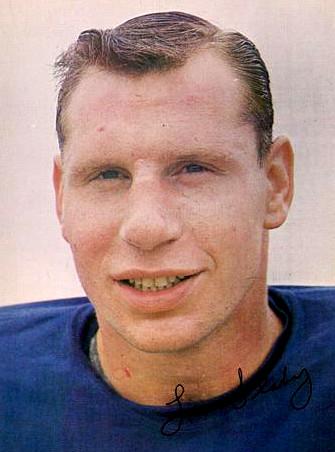
- Lou Slaby in 1965

No. 51
- Positions: Linebacker, Defensive tackle

Personal information
- Born: December 13, 1941; Cleveland, Ohio, U.S.
- Died: August 23, 2019 (aged 77); Morristown, New Jersey, U.S.
- Listed height: 6 ft 3 in (1.91 m)
- Listed weight: 235 lb (107 kg)

Career information
- High school: Salem (OH)
- College: Pittsburgh (1960–1962)
- NFL draft: 1963: 5th round, 69th overall pick
- AFL draft: 1963: 4th round, 29th overall pick

Career history
- New York Giants (1964–1965); Detroit Lions (1966)

Awards and highlights
- UPI NFL All Rookie Team (1964)

Career NFL statistics
- Fumble recoveries: 2
- Interceptions: 2
- Sacks: 4
- Stats at Pro Football Reference

Lou Slaby (December 13, 1941 – August 23, 2019) was an American college and professional football player who played linebacker and defensive tackle in the National Football League (NFL) for two seasons for the New York Giants and one season for the Detroit Lions. He played college football at the University of Pittsburgh as a fullback and linebacker.

== Early life ==
Louis Richard Slaby was born in Cleveland, Ohio of an immigrant father and first-generation mother. Lou grew up in Salem, Ohio, where he attended Salem High School. Lou lettered in football, basketball, and track. Lou played fullback and linebacker in football. The football team was coached by Ohio State's and future College Football Hall-of-Fame coach, Earle Bruce. He was named to the All-Ohio (2nd team). He was a High School All-American and played in the National High School Prep All America Classic game in Baton Rouge, Louisiana, and in Pennsylvania's Big 33 vs. All-America All-Stars game in Hershey, Pennsylvania. Lou was one of the most highly recruited high school football players in Ohio (1958-1959). Lou was subsequently voted 1st Team All-Time Salem High School football team.

In basketball, Lou averaged 13.1 points per game and 14 rebound per game. He set game, season, and career school rebounding records. Salem High School's won-loss regular season record during Lou's two years as a starter was 35 -1. His senior year Salem High School was runner-up in Ohio's Class AA basketball tournament, Ohio's highest class. He was named All-Ohio Honorable Mention and was subsequently voted 1st Team on the All-Time Salem High School basketball team.

In track and field Lou set his high school's record in the shot put.

== College career ==
Slaby played fullback and linebacker for the University of Pittsburgh (1960–1962) during an era of limited substitutions. He was also a member of the 1960–1961 Pitt varsity basketball team.

== Professional career ==
Slaby was drafted in the 5th round (69th player chosen) in the 1963 NFL draft by the New York Giants and in the 4th round (29th player chosen) in the 1963 AFL draft by the Denver Broncos (before the two leagues merged). Slaby signed with the New York Giants. Slaby was injured in training camp in 1963 and spent the season on Injured Reserve. In 1964 Slaby was named to the 1964 UPI All Rookie team. He was also named the New York Giants Rookie of the Year. The following year, he suffered a knee injury mid-year and finished the season as a defensive tackle. Slaby ended his career in 1966 with the Detroit Lions.

== Life after football ==
Slaby received a Bachelor of Science in Mechanical Engineering degree from the University of Pittsburgh and an MBA from the Baruch College School Of Business. Following football, Slaby worked in various engineering capacities. In 1986 Slaby founded Slaby Engineering Associates, Inc., an engineering consulting firm specializing in municipal engineering and planning, the design of public works projects and in land development.

Slaby was married to Virginia Slaby. They have two children, Richard and Laura.

Slaby died of heart failure on August 23, 2019, at Morristown Medical Center in Morristown, New Jersey.

== Honors and awards ==
- 1964 NFL All Rookie Team
- Pitt Varsity Letter Club Awardee of Distinction
- B'nai B'rith Award for High Achievement and Principle
- Who's Who in America (Marquis publication
- Salem High School Athletic Hall of Fame
- City of Salem Hall of Fame
- Salem High School Honored Alumnus
- Considered most celebrated athlete in the history of Salem High School

== See also ==
- 1963 NFL draft
