= Allegheny Wesleyan College =

Liberal arts college in Salem, Ohio, United States

Coordinates: 40°52′02.4″N 80°51′36.5″W

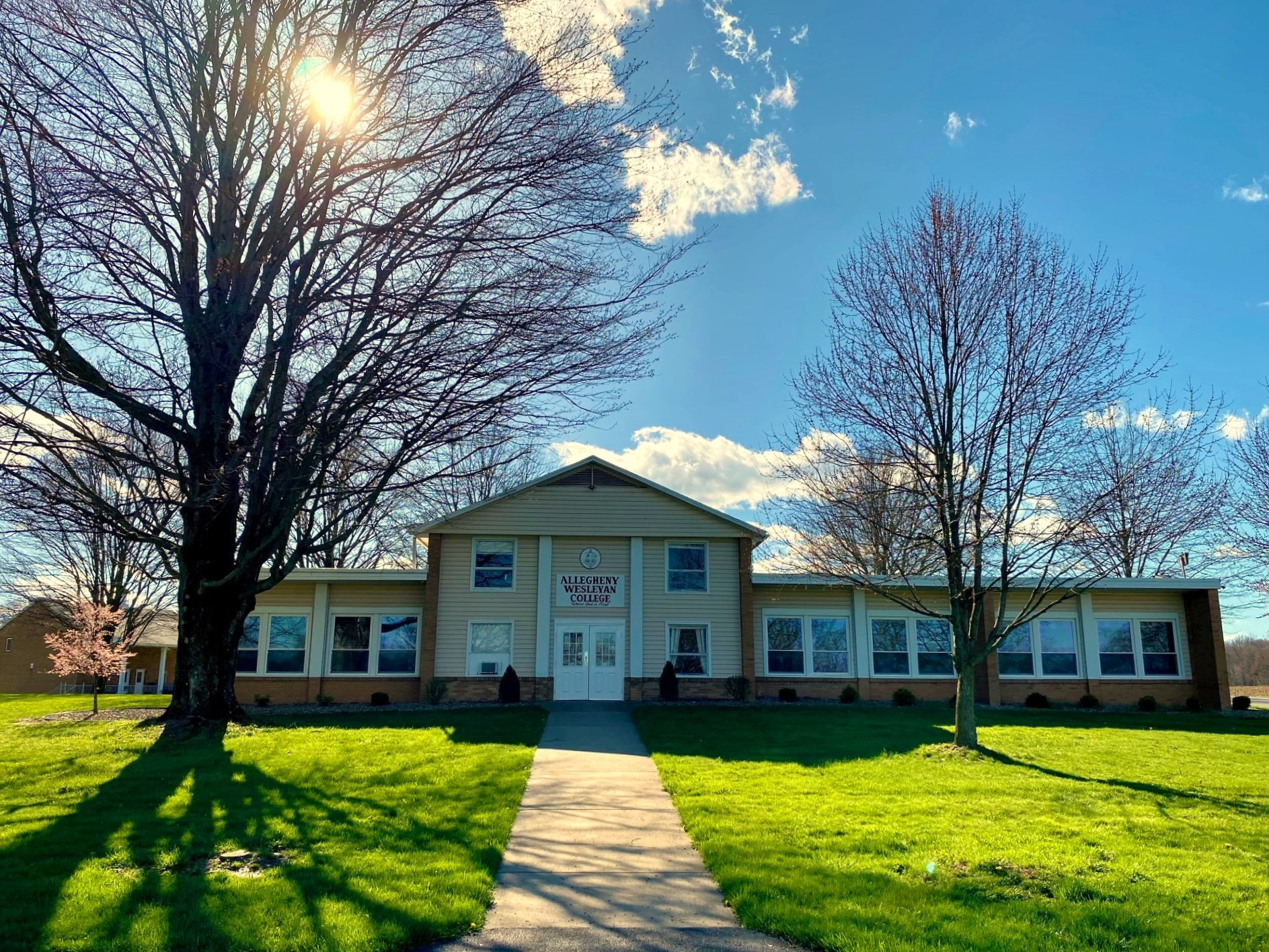
- Type: Private liberal arts college
- Established: 1957
- Affiliations: Allegheny Wesleyan Methodist Connection
- President: Daniel Hardy
- Location: Salem vicinity, Ohio, United States
- Campus: Suburban college town
- Website: awc.edu

Allegheny Wesleyan College (AWC) is a private Methodist four-year liberal arts college in Butler Township, Columbiana County, Ohio.

== History ==
Allegheny Wesleyan College started out in 1943 as a private Methodist school in Salem, Ohio. With increasing enrollment, it purchased the forty-three acre Satterthwaite Farm and erected dormitories, classrooms and a dining hall. At that time, it was known as the Salem Bible Institute or Salem Bible College. It sought out religious affiliation with the Allegheny Wesleyan Methodist Connection (AWMC) in 1973 and it continues to remain supported by the Wesleyan Methodists to this day. In the same year, the Rev. James Beers was appointed as the president of the university, which assumed its current name of Allegheny Wesleyan College.

== Admissions ==
Allegheny Wesleyan College has an open admissions policy. Its tuition rates for full-time students is US$3840.

== Academics ==
Allegheny Wesleyan College offers the Bachelor of Arts and Associate of Arts degrees in the fields of Elementary Education, Cross-Cultural Missions, Music Education, Pastoral Ministries, and Religious Studies.
