= First Global Methodist Church (Salem, Ohio) =

Historic church in Salem, Ohio, United States

- Salem First Global Methodist Church
- U.S. National Register of Historic Places
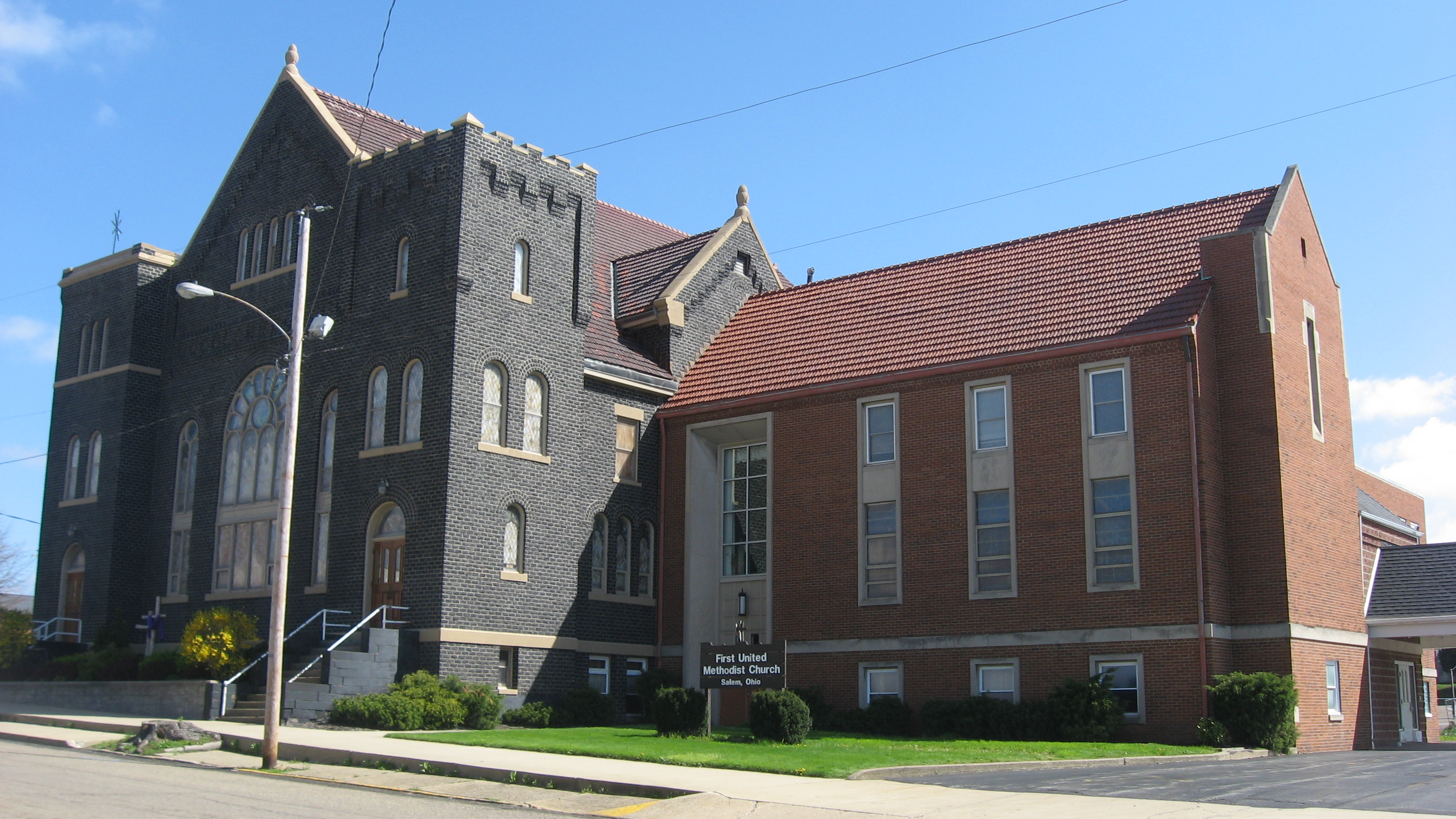
- Front of the church

- Location within Ohio Location within the United States
- Location: 244 S. Broadway, Salem, Ohio
- Coordinates: 40°53′56″N 80°51′19″W
- Area: less than one acre
- Built: 1910
- Architect: Bostick, J.M.; Myers, Jacob, & S.J. Fisher
- Architectural style: Romanesque
- NRHP reference No.: 95000167
- Added to NRHP: March 09, 1995

Salem First Global Methodist Church is a historic church located at 244 S. Broadway in Salem, Ohio.

It was built in 1910 and added to the National Register in 1995.

The congregation is part of the Global Methodist Church.
