= Salem City School District (Ohio) =

School district in Ohio, United States

Address
- 1226 East State Street Salem, Ohio, 44460; United States
- Coordinates: 40.907026°N 80.844741°W

District information
- Type: Public
- Grades: KG–12
- Superintendent: Jamie Kemats
- School board: Salem City Schools Board of Education
- NCES District ID: 3910006

Students and staff
- Enrollment: 1,913 (2024–2025)
- Teachers: 116.21 (on an FTE basis) (2024–2025)
- Staff: 194.20 (on an FTE basis) (2024–2025)
- Student–teacher ratio: 16.46 (2024–2025)

Other information
- Website: www.salemquakers.org

The Salem City School District is a public school district serving Salem and other parts of northern Columbiana County in the U.S. state of Ohio.

Salem High School is the only high school in the district. The schools' sports teams are nicknamed the "Quakers" and the mascot is "Quaker Sam". The district's colors are red and black.

== Schools currently in operation by the school district ==
Current school name	Original school name (if different)	Current grades housed	Year constructed	Building's years in use	Additional info (additions, architect, current status, etc.)
Salem Junior/ Senior High School	Salem High School	7–12	1959	64	-
Southeast School	-	5–6	1968	55	-
Reilly School	-	3–4	1928	95	-
Buckeye School	-	K–2	1948	75	-
Salem Administration Building	McKinley School	N/A	1892	131	Houses administrative offices for Salem City Schools

== Historic schools no longer in operation by the school district ==
Current school name	Original school name (if different)	Grades housed	Year constructed	Year of closure or vacation	Building's years in use	Additional info (additions, architect, current status, etc.)
Kent State University, Salem City Center Campus	Salem High School, Salem Junior High School, Salem Middle School	7–8	1917	2006	91	Architect: Charles Frederick Owsley. Home of Kent State University Salem City Center Campus and present location of Hannah Mullins School of Practical Nursing.
Prospect School	-	4–6	1896	2006	110	Architect: Albert Cameron. Sold in 2010. The purchasing couple currently live and work in the building.
Fourth Street School	-	?	1896	1974	78	Demolished
Columbia School	-	?	1881	1953	72	Demolished
Union School	-	?	1860	1896	36	Demolished
First Union School	-	?	1853	1860	7	Demolished
