= Salem Downtown Historic District (Salem, Ohio) =

Historic district in Ohio, United States

- U.S. National Register of Historic Places
- U.S. Historic district
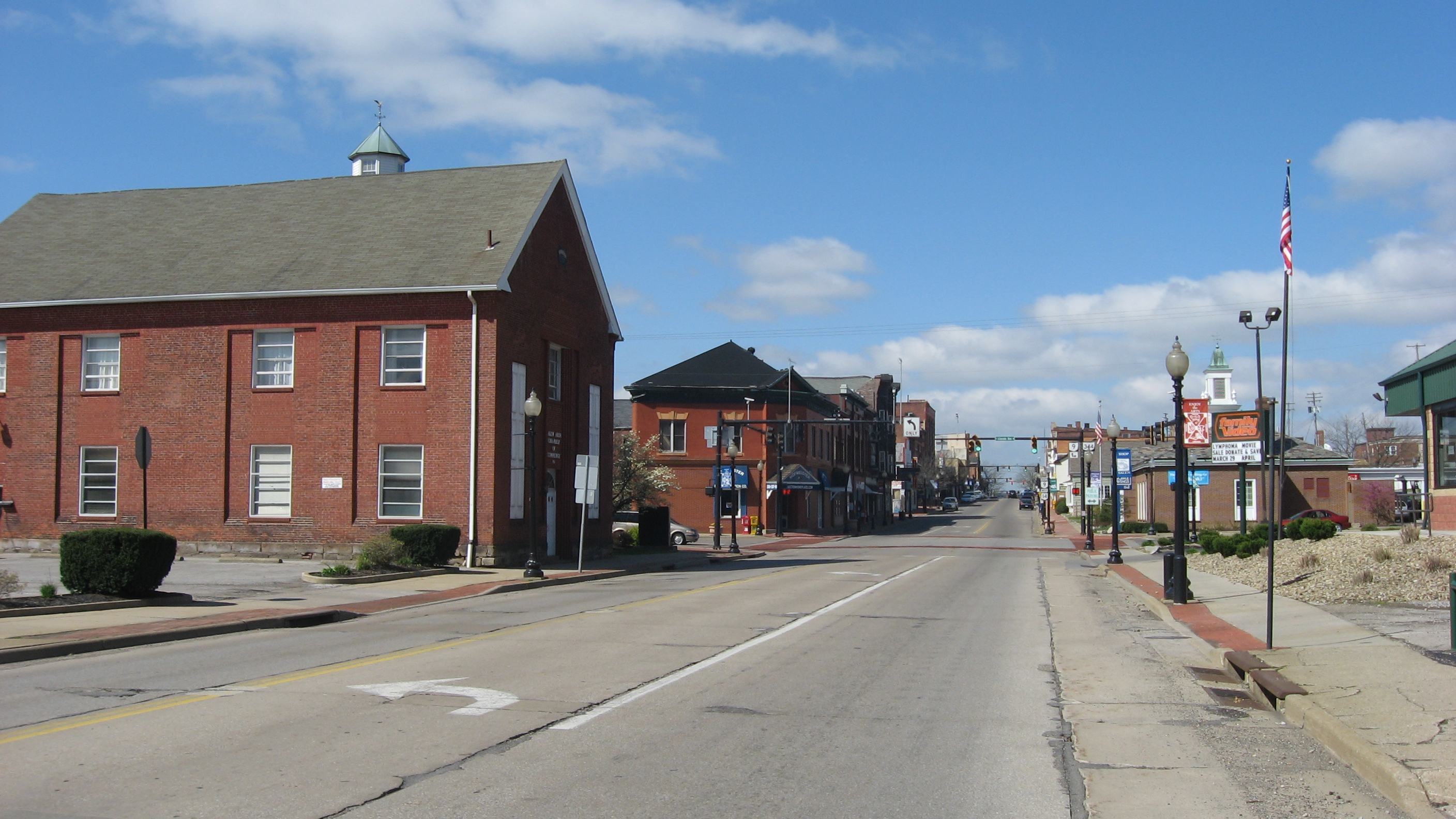
- Looking westward on E. State Street (State Route 14) on the eastern edge of downtown Salem, Ohio

- Location within Ohio Location within the United States
- Location: Roughly bounded by Vine Ave., Ohio Ave., E. Pershing St., S. Ellsworth Ave. and Sugar Tree Alley, Salem, Ohio
- Coordinates: 40.900980°N 80.853805°W
- Area: 95 acres (38 ha)
- Architect: Hutton, Finley; Owsley, Charles
- Architectural style: Greek Revival, Italianate, Queen Anne
- NRHP reference No.: 95001416
- Added to NRHP: December 7, 1995

The Salem Downtown Historic District is located in Salem, Ohio. The district covers approximately 95 acres (38 ha) bounded by Vine, Ohio, East Pershing, and South Ellsworth Streets, as well as Sugar Tree Alley. The district was added to the National Register of Historic Places in December 1995.
