= South Lincoln Avenue Historic District =

Historic district in Ohio, United States

- U.S. National Register of Historic Places
- U.S. Historic district
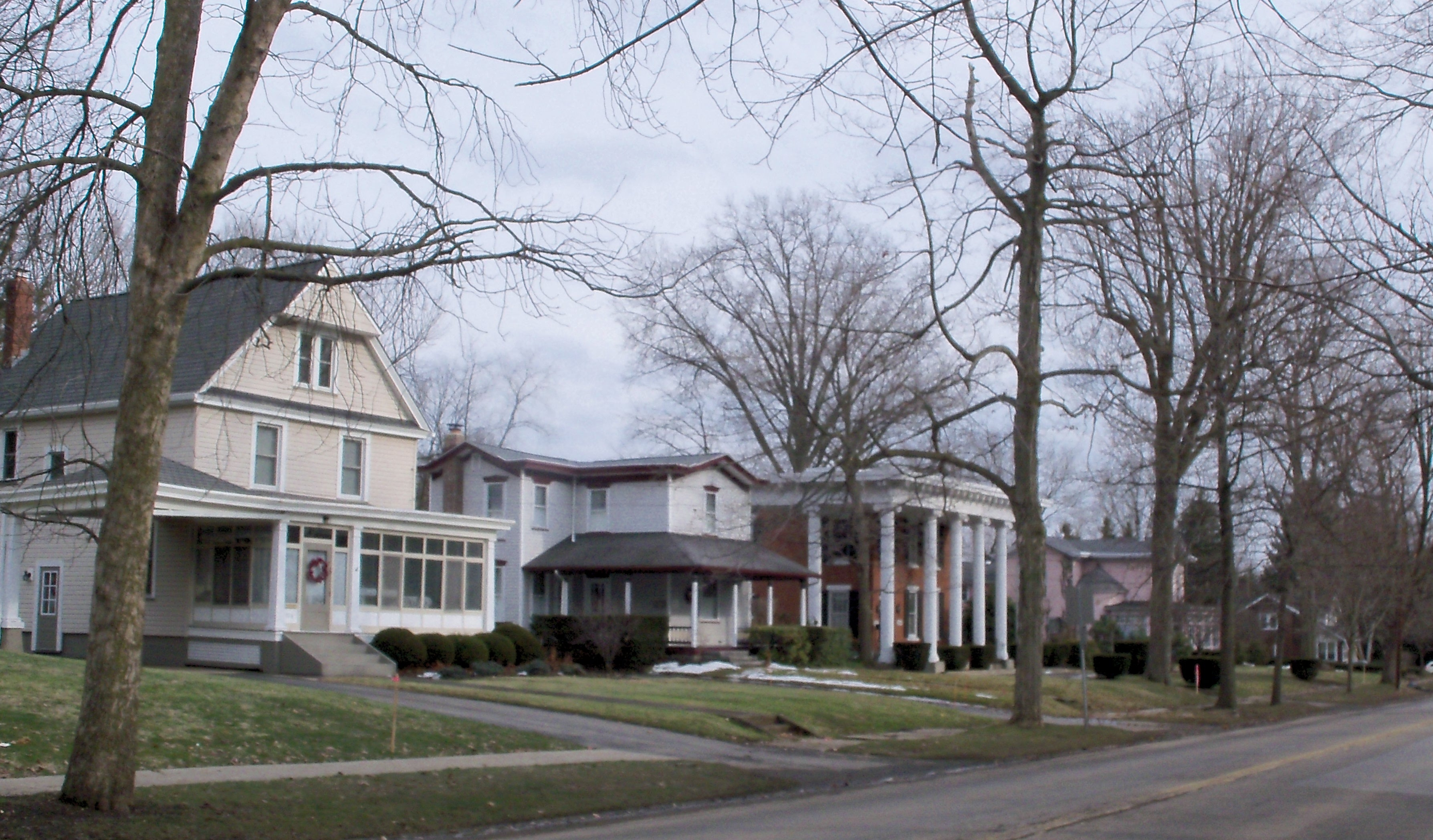
- A portion of the South Lincoln Avenue Historic District (Salem, Ohio)

- Location within Ohio Location within the United States
- Location: S. Lincoln Ave., roughly between Pershing and Summit Sts., Salem, Ohio
- Coordinates: 40°53′46″N 80°50′58″W
- Area: 40 acres (16 ha)
- Architect: Hillman, Benjamin; Smith & Smith
- Architectural style: Mid 19th Century Revival, Late Victorian, Federal
- NRHP reference No.: 93000876
- Added to NRHP: August 26, 1993

The South Lincoln Avenue Historic District lies between Pershing and Summit Streets in Salem, Ohio. Covering 400

acres of land, the district encompasses approximately 108 buildings, primarily residences, that contribute to the significance of the area. The district is notable for the architecture and design of the contributing buildings. Examples of a number of architectural styles are seen, including Mid 19th Century Revival; Victorian; and Federal.

The district was added to the National Register of Historic Places in August 1993.
