= Salem High School (Ohio) =

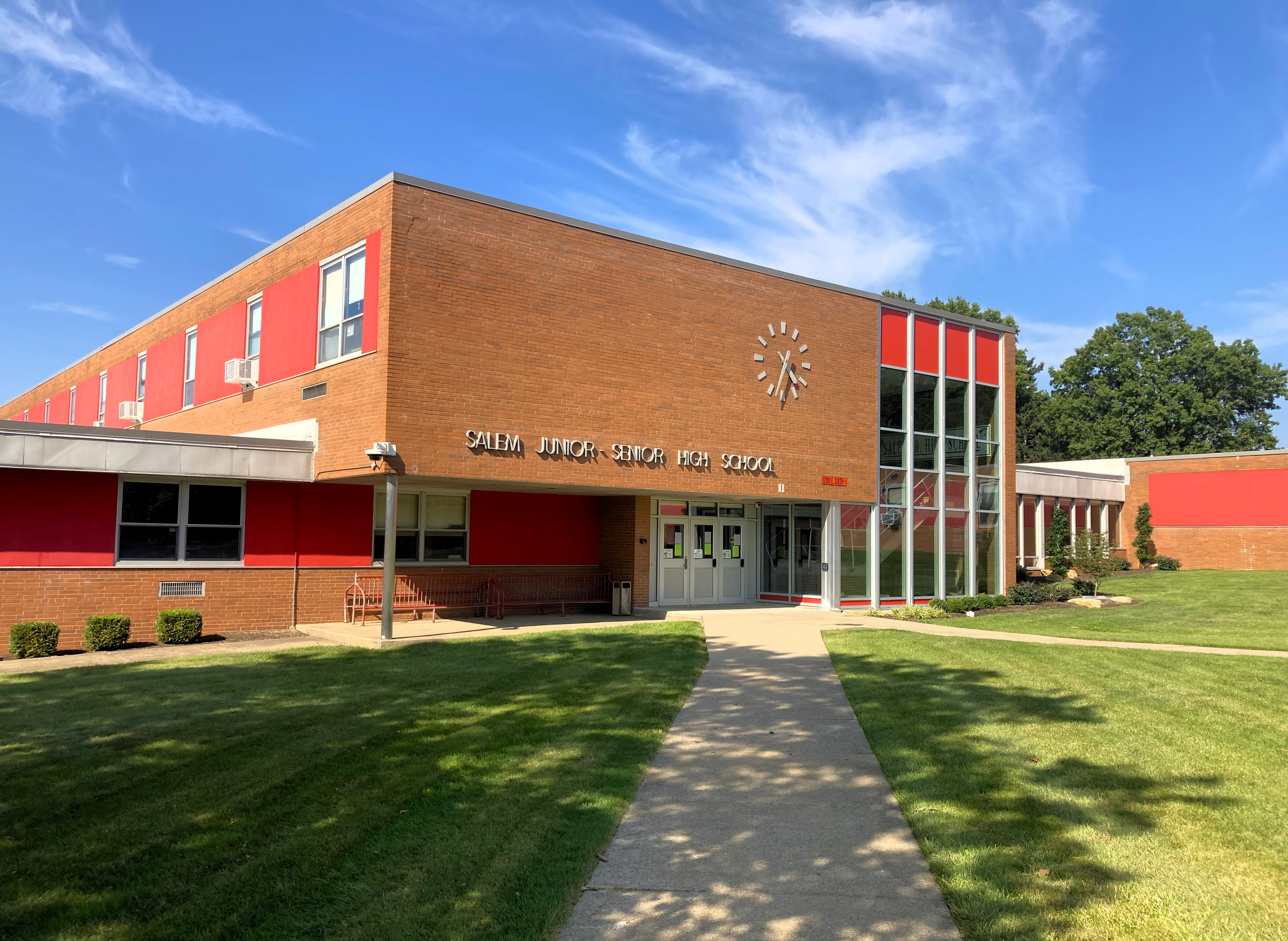

Location
- 1200 East 6th Street; Salem, Ohio 44460; United States; 40°54′25″N 80°50′41″W

Information
- Type: Public, coeducational high school
- Established: 1860
- School district: Salem City School District
- Superintendent: Sean Kirkland
- CEEB code: 364560
- Principal: Todd McLaughlin
- Teaching staff: 38.68 (FTE)
- Grades: 9–12
- Enrollment: 658 (2023-2024)
- Student to teacher ratio: 17.01
- Campus type: Fringe town
- Colors: Red and black
- Athletics conference: Eastern Buckeye Conference
- Team name: Quakers
- Newspaper: The Quaker
- Yearbook: Quaker Annual
- Website: salemquakers.k12.oh.us/senior-high/

Salem High School is a public high school in Salem, Ohio, United States. It is the only high school in the Salem City School District. Athletic teams are known as the Quakers, and play as a member of the Ohio High School Athletic Association in the Eastern Buckeye Conference.

== History ==
Opened in 1860, Salem High School serves students grades 9–12.

In 1917, the high school, which was used until 2006, was built.

Since 2006, the campus has also housed Salem Junior High School for grades 7 and 8, though it is administered separately from the high school.

== Academics ==
Salem High School offers courses in the traditional American curriculum. Entering their third and fourth years, students may attend the Columbiana County Career and Technical Center in Lisbon, either part-time or full-time.

== Athletics ==
Salem High School currently offers:

- Baseball
- Basketball
- Bowling
- Cheerleading
- Cross country
- Golf
- Football
- Soccer
- Softball
- Swimming
- Tennis
- Track and field
- Volleyball
- Wrestling

=== OHSAA State Championships ===
- Boys' cross country - 1930, 1931, 1993, 2004, 2005
- Girls' cross country - 2005, 2006
- Boys' track - 2005, 2006

== Notable alumni ==
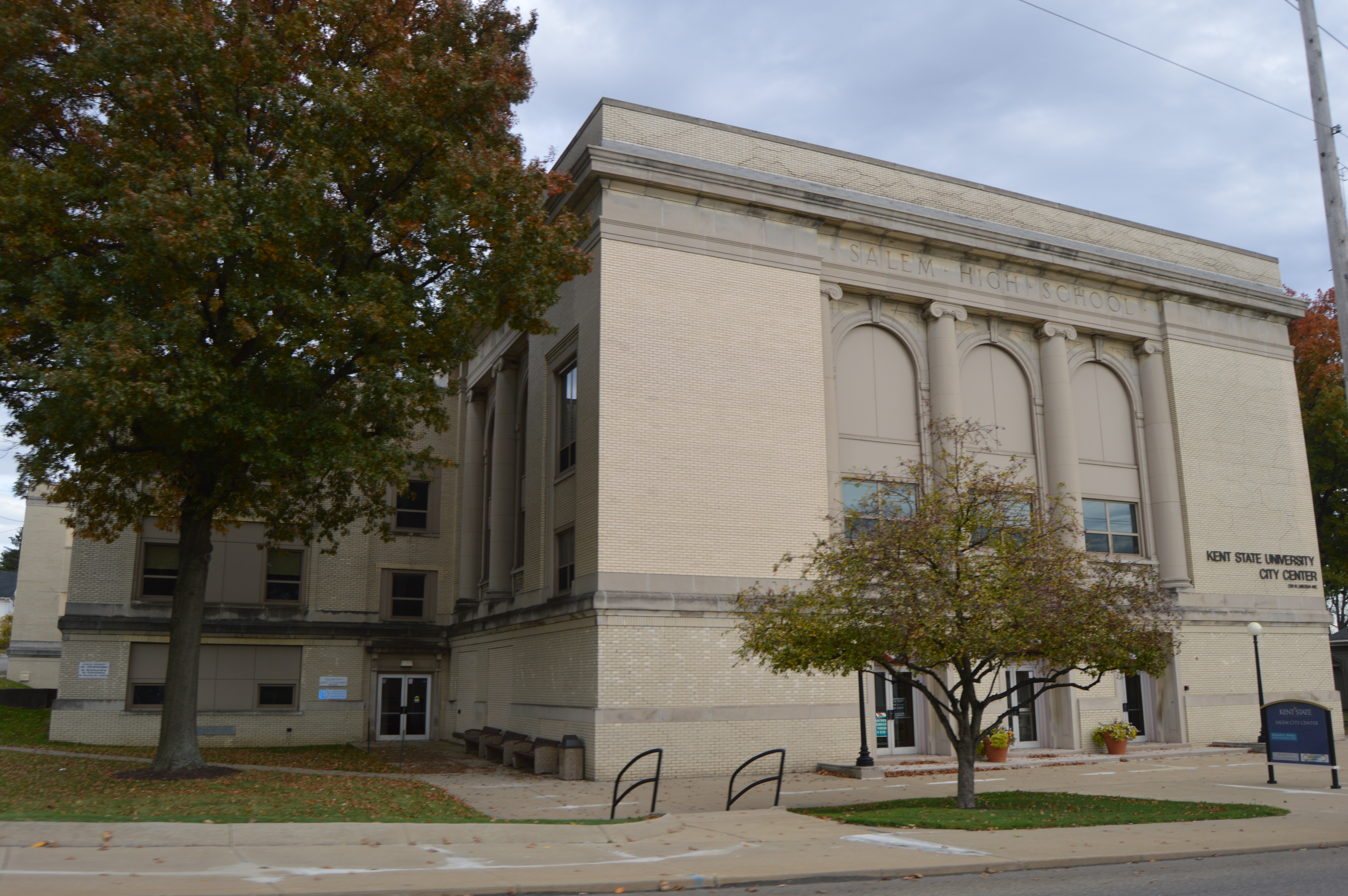
Former downtown campus, now used by Kent State University at Salem

- Dustin Bates - lead singer of Starset
- Charles E. Burchfield - former painter and visionary artist
- Alan Freed - former disc jockey
- Rich Karlis - former professional football player in the National Football League (NFL)
- Kirk Lowdermilk - former professional football player in the National Football League (NFL)
- Jerry Meals - umpire in the Major League Baseball (MLB)
- Chip Mosher - former educator, author and poet
- Tim Schuller - former music critic
- Lou Slaby - former professional football player in the National Football League (NFL)
- Lloyd Yoder - former college football player
