= John Street House =

Historic house in Ohio, United States

- U.S. National Register of Historic Places
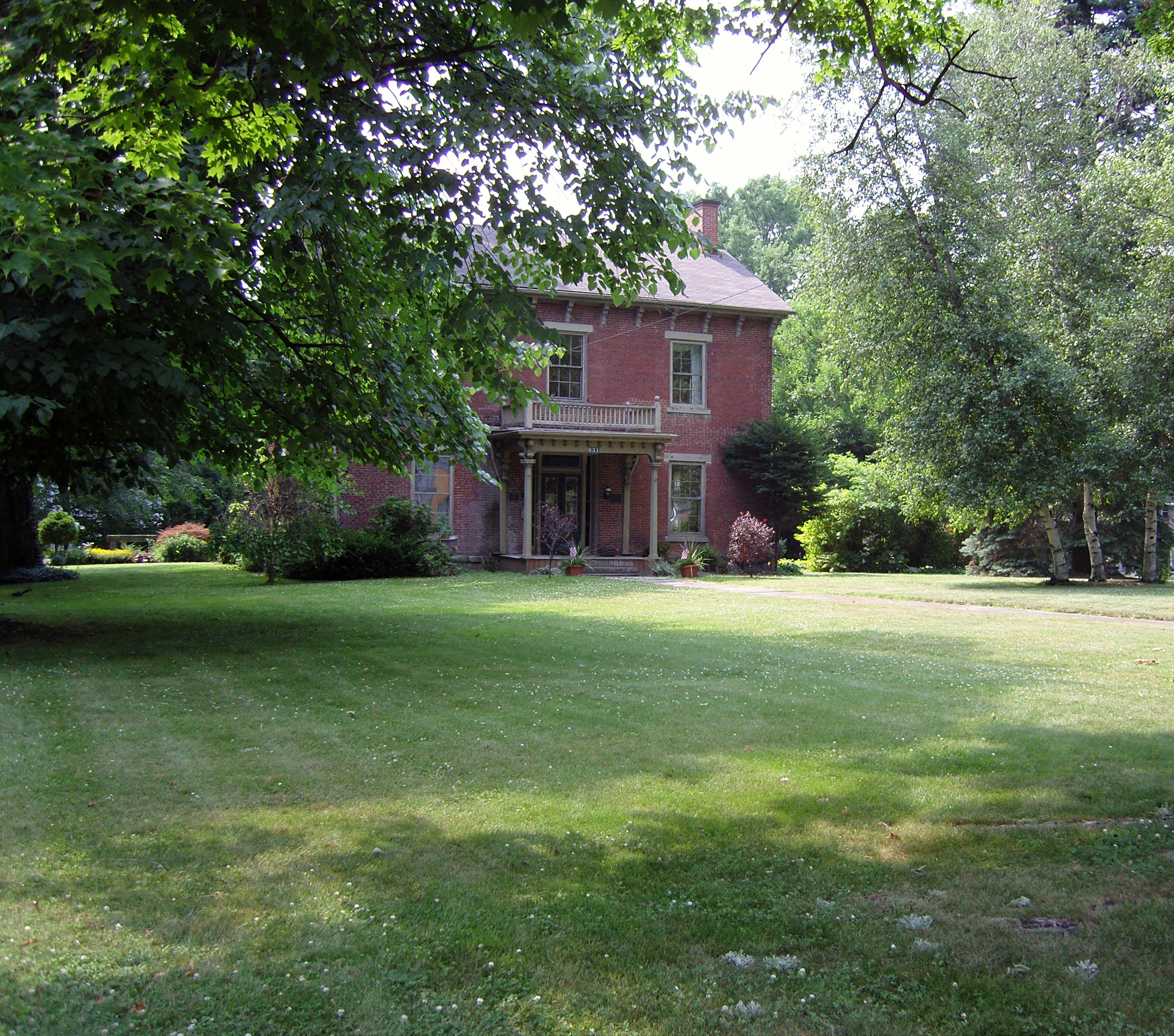
- John Street House in summer

- Location within Ohio Location within the United States
- Location: 631 N. Ellsworth Avenue; Salem, Ohio
- Coordinates: 40°54′17″N 80°51′26″W
- Built: 1838
- Architectural style: Italianate/Neoclassical
- NRHP reference No.: 73001400
- Added to NRHP: October 10, 1973

The John Street House is a historic home in Salem, Ohio. It was a stop on the Underground Railroad.

== History and role in abolitionism ==
Salem, Ohio, was a major nexus of corridors along the Underground Railroad. In the city itself, there were at least six stops, primarily in the southern half, located closest to the actual railroad lines. The John Street House is one of the northernmost stops in Salem.

Built in 1838, the building was initially constructed as the residence of John Street, a son of the city's co-founder, Zadok Street. The Street family were Quakers and active in the Western Anti-slavery Society, an abolitionist organization then headquartered in Salem. Interested in aiding fleeing slaves, the Streets altered their residence after its initial construction, and provided food and clandestine lodging in several hiding spaces throughout the house. In a windowless basement, fugitive slaves would sleep during the day and travel to another "station" on the Railroad by night. This location was connected by a tunnel built under what is now Ellsworth Avenue to the house across the street. The famous abolitionist John Brown was a frequent guest at the house.

== Current status ==
The John Street House is a private residence, and is not open to the public.

The house is listed on the National Register of Historic Places for its architectural significance.
