= Teegarden-Centennial Covered Bridge =

- Teegarden--Centennial Covered Bridge
- U.S. National Register of Historic Places
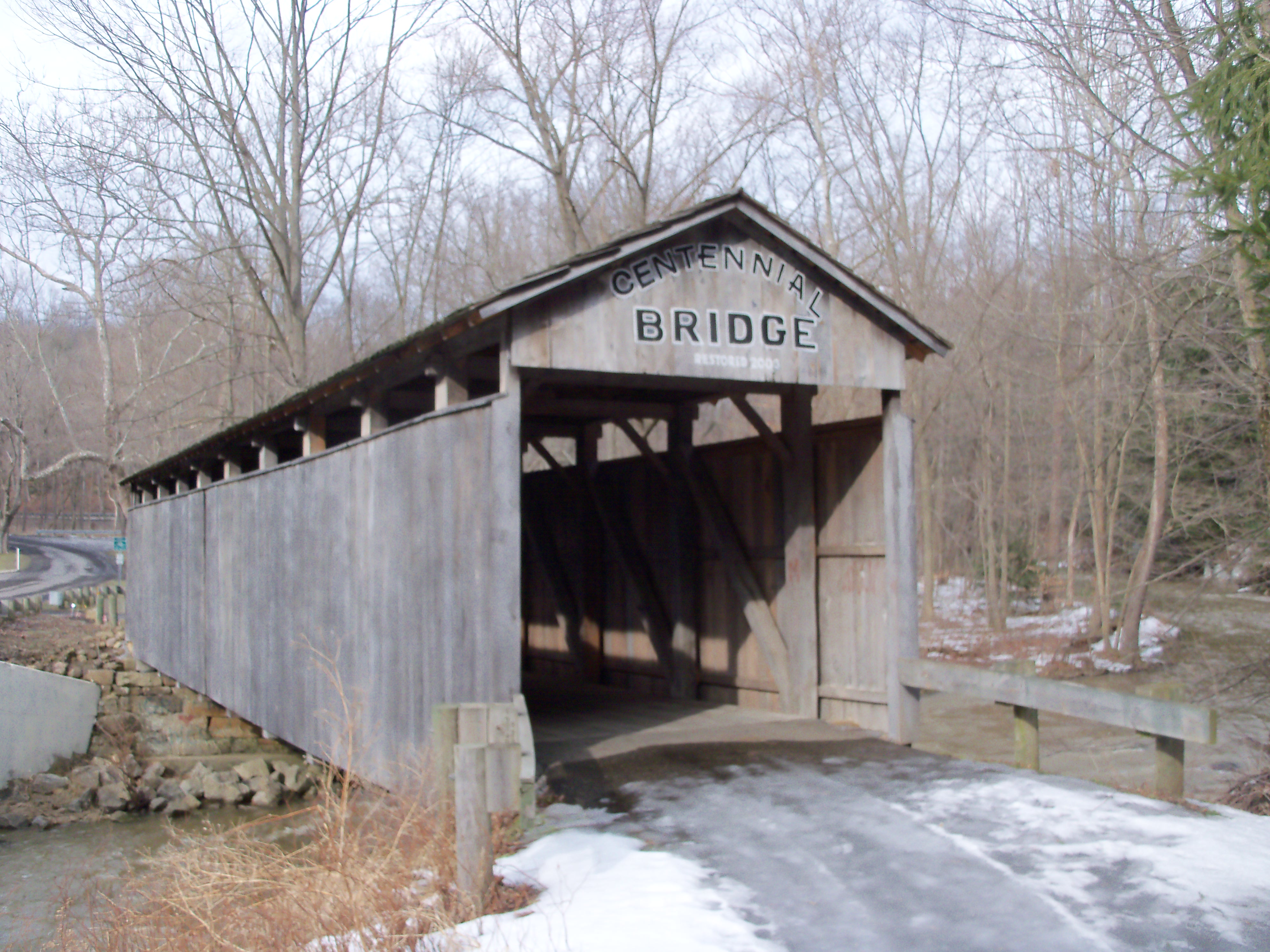
- Teegarden-Centennial Covered Bridge

- Location within Ohio Location within the United States
- Nearest city: Salem, Ohio
- Coordinates: 40°49′18″N 80°49′38″W
- Area: less than one acre
- Built: 1875
- Architect: Jeremiah C. Mountz, David Reese
- Architectural style: Covered bridge
- NRHP reference No.: 00000961
- Added to NRHP: August 10, 2000

The Teegarden-Centennial Covered Bridge is a covered bridge in Columbiana County, Ohio. The bridge crosses Little Beaver Creek on Eagleton Road, 0.1 miles East of county road 411 near Salem, Ohio. It is currently only open to pedestrian traffic.

It was named after U. Teegarden who owned land near the bridge. Also known as the Centennial Bridge, it was built in 1876, 100 years after the signing of the United States Declaration of Independence.

The 66-foot, multiple king post span was designed by Jeremiah C. Mountz and David Reese. The bridge was in use until 1992 and underwent restoration in 2003. It was added to the National Register of Historic Places in August 2010.
