= Albert Cameron =

American architect (–1915)

- Born: c.1841
- Died: Salem, Ohio, US
- Occupation: Architect
- Buildings: Prospect School, Salem, Ohio

Albert Cameron (c.1841 – March 18, 1915) was an American architect based in Salem, Ohio. One of his major projects was the Prospect School, an elementary school in Salem, built in 1896.

Cameron died in Salem on March 18, 1915 at the age of 74.
