= USS Keokuk (CMc-6) =

American minelayer

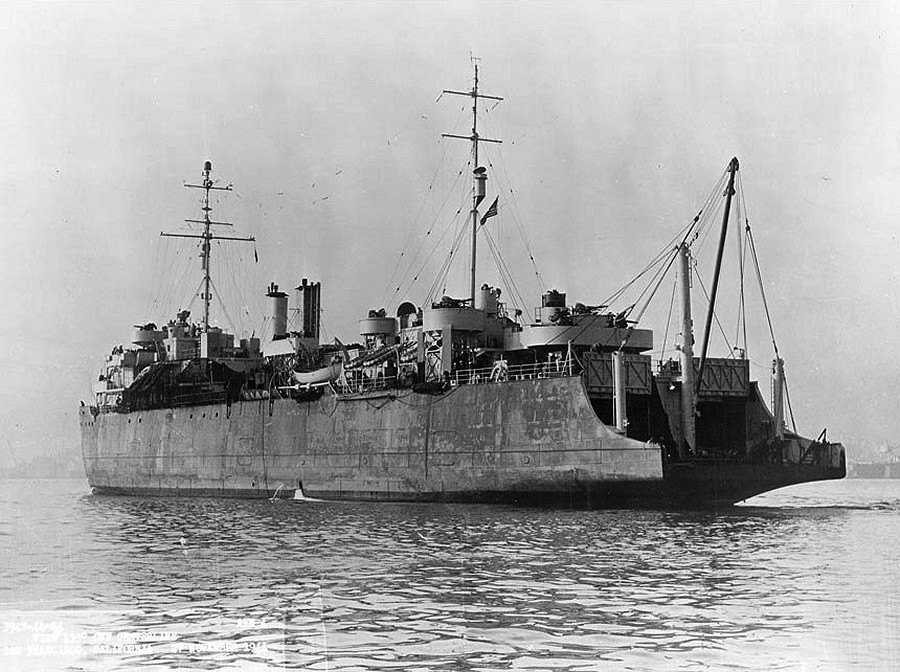

History

United States
- Name: SS Henry M. Flagler
- Namesake: Henry Morrison Flagler
- Operator: Florida East Coast Car Ferry Company
- Builder: William Cramp & Sons, Philadelphia, Pennsylvania
- Laid down: 1914
- Launched: 22 September 1914
- Fate: Requisitioned by US Navy, 28 July 1941

United States
- Name: USS Keokuk
- Acquired: by requisition, 28 July 1941
- Commissioned: 28 February 1942
- Decommissioned: 5 December 1945
- Reclassified: Coastal Minelayer, CMc-6, 1941; Net Layer, AN-5, 1941; Minelayer, CM-8, 18 May 1942; Net Cargo Ship, AKN-4, 1943
- Fate: Sold, 7 March 1947

General characteristics
- Type: Commercial cargo carrier
- Displacement: 6,150 long tons (6,249 t)
- Length: 353 ft (108 m)
- Beam: 57 ft (17 m)
- Draft: 17 ft (5.2 m)
- Propulsion: 2 × Cramp vertical triple expansion engines, 2,700 shp (2,013 kW) each; 4 × Scotch single-ended cylindrical boilers; 2 shafts
- Speed: 12 knots (22 km/h; 14 mph)
- Complement: 278
- Armament: 3 × 3"/50 dual-purpose gun mounts; 2 × twin 40 mm AA guns; 4 × .50 cal (12.7 mm) machine guns; 2 × .30 caliber machine guns

Service record
- Operations: World War II; Invasion of Sicily; Battle of Saipan; Battle of Okinawa
- Awards: 5 battle stars

USS Keokuk (AN-5/CM-8/CMc-6/AKN-4) was a mine and net laying ship of the United States Navy during World War II.

Laid down in 1914 as the SS Henry M. Flagler by William Cramp & Sons, Philadelphia, and renamed SS Columbia Heights in 1940, she was acquired by the U.S. Navy on 28 July 1941 for conversion to a coastal minelayer, CMc-6. Reclassified as a net layer, AN-5, and named USS Keokuk on 15 August 1941, she was commissioned on 28 February 1942. Reclassified as a minelayer, CM-8, on 18 May 1942, and again as a net cargo ship, AKN-4, in November 1943.

== Service history ==
=== Atlantic Coast operations ===
Keokuk cleared Delaware Bay on 7 March 1942 and arrived Norfolk, Virginia, the same day to commence service as a net layer. She operated out of Norfolk and Key West, Florida, for two months before she was reclassified as minelayer CM-8 on 18 May 1942. Based at Yorktown, Virginia, mine depot that summer, Keokuk engaged in high-priority mine laying along the Atlantic coast.

=== World War II North Africa operations ===
As the war in Europe intensified, the mine layer made preparations for service in the Mediterranean. Departing Brooklyn, New York, on 13 November, Keokuk crossed the submarine-infested Atlantic and arrived at Casablanca on 1 December. She remained in North African waters for seven weeks laying mines off the harbor of Casablanca. She sailed on 20 January 1943 with convoy GUS-8, arriving New York on 7 February. Following repairs at Hoboken, New Jersey, Keokuk sailed on 1 March to commence net-laying exercises out of Melville, Rhode Island.

=== Invasion of Sicily ===
During April and May, the minelayer operated with the mine warfare school at Yorktown, Virginia; then sailed to Brooklyn, New York, to join a convoy bound for Algeria. Keokuk departed Brooklyn on 13 June, arriving Oran, Algeria, 4 July. Two days later she steamed toward Gela, Sicily, to lay antisubmarine minefields prior to the landing there. During these operations, on 11 July, Keokuk was attacked by six enemy planes; but anti-aircraft fire drove the raiders off. After the successful conclusion of the Sicilian campaign, she operated out of Algeria until sailing for Norfolk, Virginia, 7 October.

=== World War II Pacific Theatre operations ===
Upon completion of a short overhaul, Keokuk was converted to a net layer and, reclassified AKN-4, departed Norfolk, Virginia, on 23 November for the Pacific. She arrived at Tarawa on 3 February 1944 after a month's stay at Pearl Harbor, and immediately commenced net laying operations in the Marshall Islands. She continued this service until 12 April when she cleared Eniwetok to load new net at San Francisco, California. Keokuk returned to Kwajalein on 9 June, and departed two days later to engage in the amphibious assault on Saipan. She arrived in Saipan waters on 19 June and began laying antisubmarine net off Tanapag Harbor.

Following the Saipan campaign the net-cargo ship operated out of Eniwetok until 17 July when she once again sailed for San Francisco, California. Upon her return to Guadalcanal on 1 September, Keokuk readied herself for the assault on Peleliu which was needed as a base for the subsequent invasion in the Philippines. She arrived off Kossol Passage on 17 September and continued net laying operations for a month before arriving at Manus on 17 October. The next day Keokuk sailed for San Francisco, California, to undergo repair and overhaul.

The net-cargo ship returned to Eniwetok on 6 February 1945 as the war was approaching its climax. Keokuk departed Guam on 16 February, bound for the Japanese-held volcano fortress, Iwo Jima. She commenced net laying operations four days later, as she played her key role in this courageous undertaking.

=== Struck by a kamikaze ===
On 21 February just prior to sunset while cruising in formation with a group of LSTs, an enemy "Jill" dived out of the clouds and hit Keokuk on the starboard side, knocking out most of the starboard 20 mm guns battery. The fires were extinguished by 18:50; the ship had 17 killed and 44 wounded in the action.

Upon completion of repairs at Leyte, the net-cargo ship sailed on 19 March toward the last great hurdle – Okinawa. Keokuk arrived off Kerama Retto on 26 March to lay antisubmarine nets prior to the invasion. With the invasion well under way, she cleared the battle area 4 April, arriving Saipan 10 April. Then after a two-month overhaul at Pearl Harbor, Keokuk returned to Eniwetok on 2 July to unload net material. As the war entered its final month, she sailed from Ulithi on 25 July, and, after a stop at Pearl Harbor, arrived San Francisco, California, 10 September.

The veteran ship remained there until she decommissioned on 5 December 1945 at San Francisco, California. She was transferred to the War Shipping Administration on 1 July 1946 for disposal; and sold on 7 March 1947 to the West India Fruit and Steamship Company of Florida.

Keokuk received five battle stars for World War II service.
