= Kent State University at Salem =

Satellite campus of Kent State University located in Salem, Ohio, USA

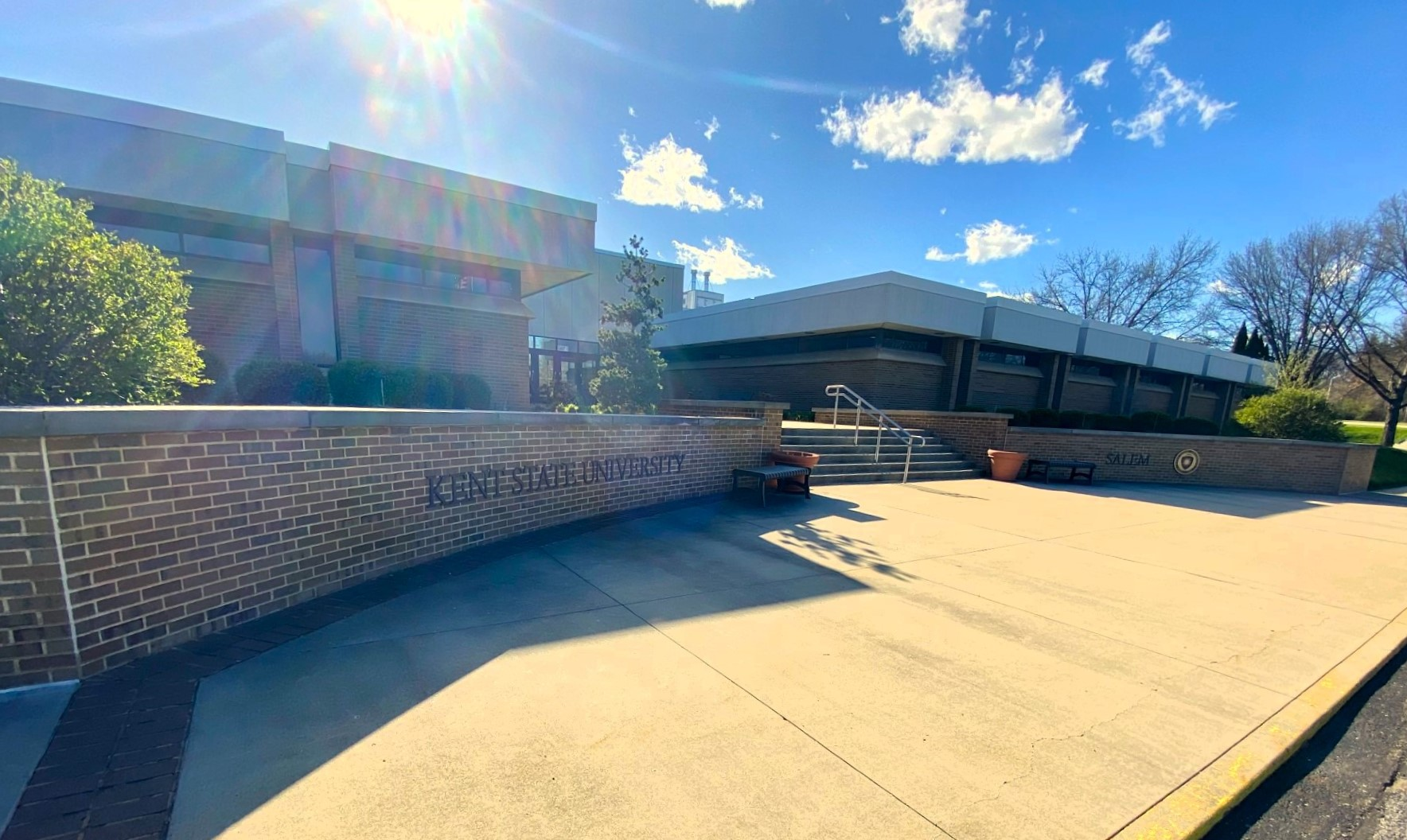
- Type: Public; Satellite
- Established: 1962; 64 years ago
- Parent institution: Kent State University
- Dean: Denise A. Seachrist
- Faculty: 44
- Administrative staff: 40
- Students: 957 (fall 2021)
- Location: Salem Township, Ohio, United States; 40°51′50″N 80°50′09″W
- Campus: 98 acres (40 ha); Suburban
- Website: www.kent.edu/columbiana

Kent State University at Salem (Kent State Salem) is a satellite campus of Kent State University in the vicinity of Salem, Ohio, United States. Kent State Salem offers baccalaureate and associate degree programs and is administered with Kent State University at East Liverpool. As of 2021, enrollment at Kent State Salem was 957 with total enrollment for the Columbiana Campuses at over 1,400.

Kent State Salem occupies a 98 acres (40 ha) campus in Salem Township, just south of the Salem city limits, as well as the City Center campus in downtown Salem on the former site of Salem High School.

== History ==
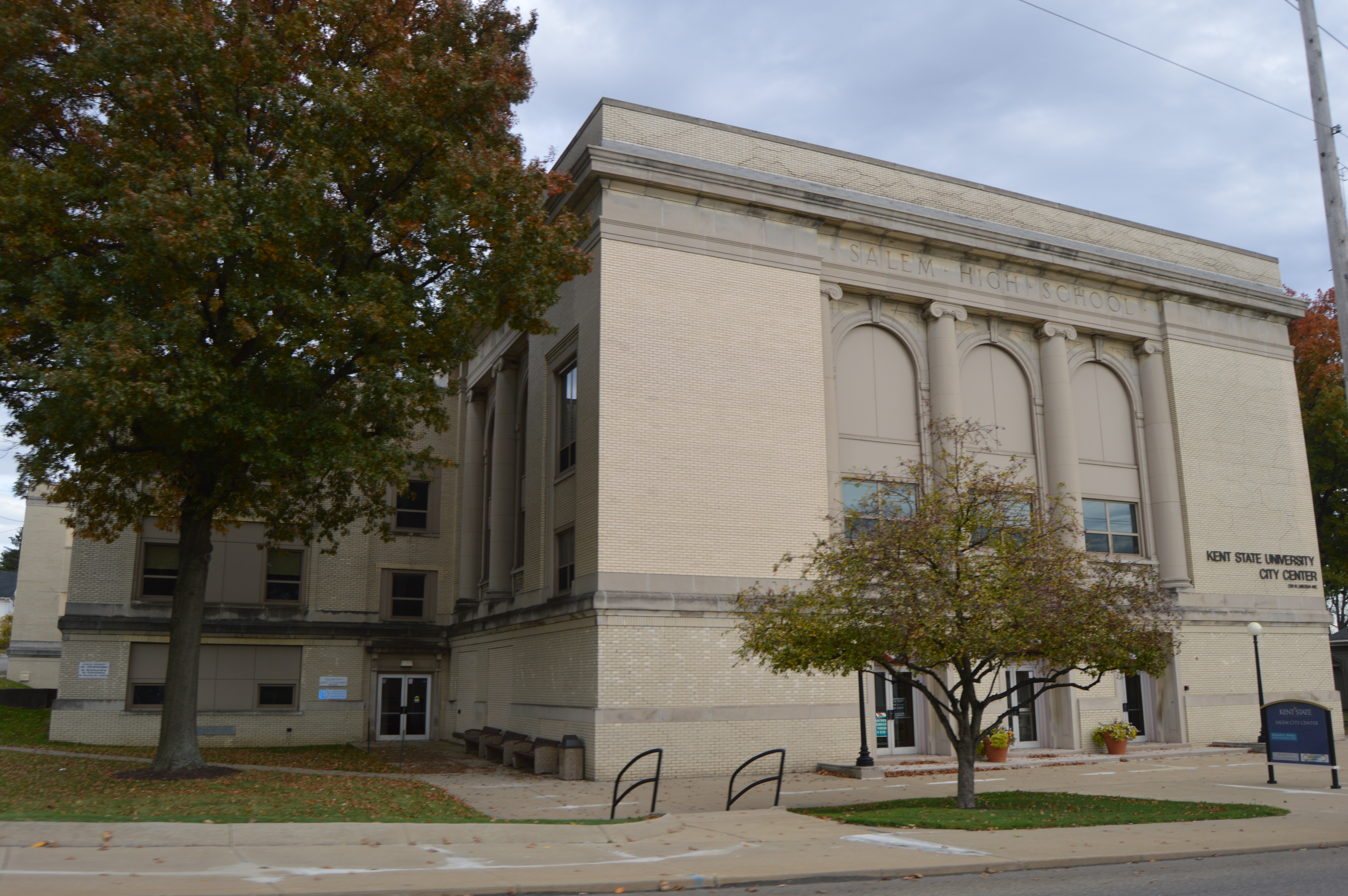
The former Salem High School building is now used by Kent State Salem as one of its campus buildings.

Kent State Salem was established in 1962 as an outreach program housed at Salem High School. In 1966, it was relocated to an office building on South Broadway Street before it was moved to the permanent campus site in 1971. In August 2011, the Health and Sciences wing was completed. The wing consists of additional centralized classrooms, labs, lecture hall and centralized faculty offices for nursing and radiology.

The land along OH-45 was donated to Kent State University by Ernest Uriah Whitacre in 1967, and he stipulated that the land be used for post-high school education. Groundbreaking ceremonies were held October 24, 1969. The site was formerly Whitacre Orchards, Inc.

== Academics ==
Like other Kent State regional campuses, students at Kent State Salem can begin coursework for any of the undergraduate majors available at Kent State. Combined with Kent State East Liverpool, more than 20 degrees are offered, including 12 bachelor's degrees. Tuition is also lower than at the main campus in Kent for in-state, lower division classes. Out-of-state tuition for residents in select counties in West Virginia and Pennsylvania was reduced in the spring of 2010. Residents must reside in either Brooke, Hancock or Ohio counties in West Virginia, or, Allegheny, Beaver, Butler, Crawford, Erie, Lawrence or Mercer county in Western Pennsylvania. As of September 2011, enrollment at Kent State Salem is 2,023.
