= West India Fruit and Steamship Company =

West India Fruit and Steamship
Overview
- Headquarters: Roanoke, Virginia
- Reporting mark: WIF
- Locale: Southern Florida and Cuba
- Dates of operation: 1946–1961

Technical
- Track gauge: 4 ft 8 1/2 in (1,435 mm) standard gauge

The West India Fruit and Steamship Company operated a railcar ferry service between the Port of Palm Beach, Florida, and Havana, Cuba, from shortly after World War II until deteriorating relations between the United States and Cuba culminated in the United States embargo against Cuba. The company offered six of its ferries for sale in June 1961, citing the fact that "trade had dwindled to the vanishing point" and service ceased in August 1961.

WIF&SS Co., in its role as a car ferry operator, acted as both a railroad and a steamship line. The service was described as “The Superior All-Rail Route to Cuba.” Freight from anywhere in North America could be routed to Cuban consignees “in the same cars and packaging in which it left point of origin in the United States.” This had advantages enumerated in WIF&SS Co. sales literature – reduced transit time, less handling of freight, and no repackaging.

== Vessels ==
During its history, the WIF&SS Co. operated a total of five car ferries to Cuba very similar in design and operation to the ferries built for Great Lakes service. In addition the company operated two other vessels between the United States and Cuba.

- SS Grand Haven (Car Ferry)
- SS Henry M. Flagler (Car Ferry)
- SS Joseph R. Parrott (Car Ferry)
- SS New Grand Haven (Car Ferry)
- SS City of New Orleans (Car Ferry)
- SS Sea Level (Ship)
- SS City of Havana (Automobile Ferry)

The Grand Haven was formerly a Grand Trunk Milwaukee Car Ferry Company vessel used previously in trans-Lake Michigan service. She was built by Craig Shipbuilding of Toledo, Ohio, in 1903 and appears, from photographic evidence, to be the only ferry in Cuban service fitted with a stern gate, a U.S. Coast Guard requirement for Great Lakes car ferries. She was retired by the WIF&SS Co. in 1960. (Grand Trunk Milwaukee was a Grand Trunk Railway subsidiary which itself was a subsidiary of Canadian National Railway, then a Crown corporation.)

The Henry M. Flagler and the Joseph R. Parrott, former Florida East Coast Car Ferry Company vessels, were built by William Cramp and Sons of Philadelphia in 1914 and 1916 respectively for service between Key West, Florida and Havana, Cuba. Requisitioned by the US Navy for duties in World War II, they were subsequently acquired by WIF&SS Co. for post-war service. (Florida East Coast Car Ferry Company was a Florida East Coast Railway subsidiary and chose not to reenter the car ferry trade after the war.)

The New Grand Haven was built by Canadian Vickers, Ltd. in Montreal in 1951.

The City of New Orleans was built by Kure Shipbuilding and Engineering Company of Kure City, Japan, in 1959. It is believed she only made approximately a hundred trips before service to Cuba was suspended.

In addition to the car ferries, the company purchased from Seatrain Lines, Seatrain New Orleans, a four-deck ship built by Swan, Hunter, and Wigham Richardson of Newcastle upon Tyne, England, in 1928. She ran from Belle Chasse (New Orleans) to Havana. Cars were loaded and unloaded by crane and cradles. She was renamed Sea Level by the WIF&SS Co. and continued in service from Belle Chasse.

The company also operated an automobile and passenger ferry, the City of Havana, between Key West and Havana.

All the car ferries were active till the cessation of service except for the Grand Haven which had been retired in 1960.

=== Rail equipment ===
The WIF&SS Co. operated at various times a fleet of WIF marked refrigerator cars and boxcars. In the railroad section of the January 1957 Official Railway Equipment Register, 260 cars were listed.

== Connections ==
At Palm Beach, the company connected with the Florida East Coast Railway (FEC) via the West Palm Beach Terminal Company (WPBT). WPBT physically switched railcars on and off the ferries for the WIF&SS Co. Freight in cars from any North American railway could be routed to the FEC by way of interchange in Jacksonville, Florida. [1] In Havana connection was with the Ferrocarriles Unidos de la Habana (FCUH) or in English United Railways of Havana, which had interchanges with the other Cuban railways. At Belle Chase, LA the WIF&SS Co. connected the rest of the North American system via the New Orleans and Lower Coast, a Missouri Pacific subsidiary.

== Operations ==
No transfer of commodities was necessary upon arrival or railcars in Havana; Cuban railways handled the railcars directly to consignees. North American owned railcars operated routinely throughout Cuba, but evidence suggests that cars of the Cuban railways rarely, if ever, operated on North American roads. The WIF&SS Co. maintained a fleet of refrigerator cars and boxcars with WIF reporting marks. WIF boxcars did regularly operate throughout the United States.

Cargo carried northward included tobacco, refined sugar, pineapples, rum, tomatoes, slaughterhouse byproducts, and scrap metal. Cuban bound freight included less-than-carload merchandise, manufactured goods, chemicals, lard, railway equipment, temperate zone fruit such as apples, pears, and grapes, meat, dairy, steel products, and machinery, including oversized loads.

== Forerunners and competitors ==
Other known companies engaged in United States–Cuba car ferry service are as follows:

The Florida East Coast Car Ferry Company, beginning in 1915, operated a service from Key West, Florida to Havana. After the Labor Day Hurricane of 1935 destroyed the FEC Key West Extension, service was transferred to Port Everglades. Three ferries were operated until World War II when they were requisitioned by the Navy. The two that survived the war were acquired by the WIF&SS Co. and restored their original names. After the war, FEC did not resume car ferry service.

Seatrain Lines participated in the coasting trade beginning in 1929 hauling railcars between Hoboken, New Jersey, Savannah, Georgia, New Orleans, Louisiana, Havana, Cuba, and Texas City, Texas. In 1953 Seatrain sold its rights and one vessel in the New Orleans to Havana trade to the WIF&SS Co.

Suwannee Trainferry Lines operated at least one ship, the Antonio Maceo, out of Port Everglades to Cuba. The Antonio Maceo had a substantially different configuration than the Great Lakes style ships used by the WIF&SS Co. Very little documentation exists on this company and possibly service did not last for an extended period. Service started some date after World War II.
