= Daniel Howell Hise House =

Historic house in Ohio, United States

- U.S. National Register of Historic Places
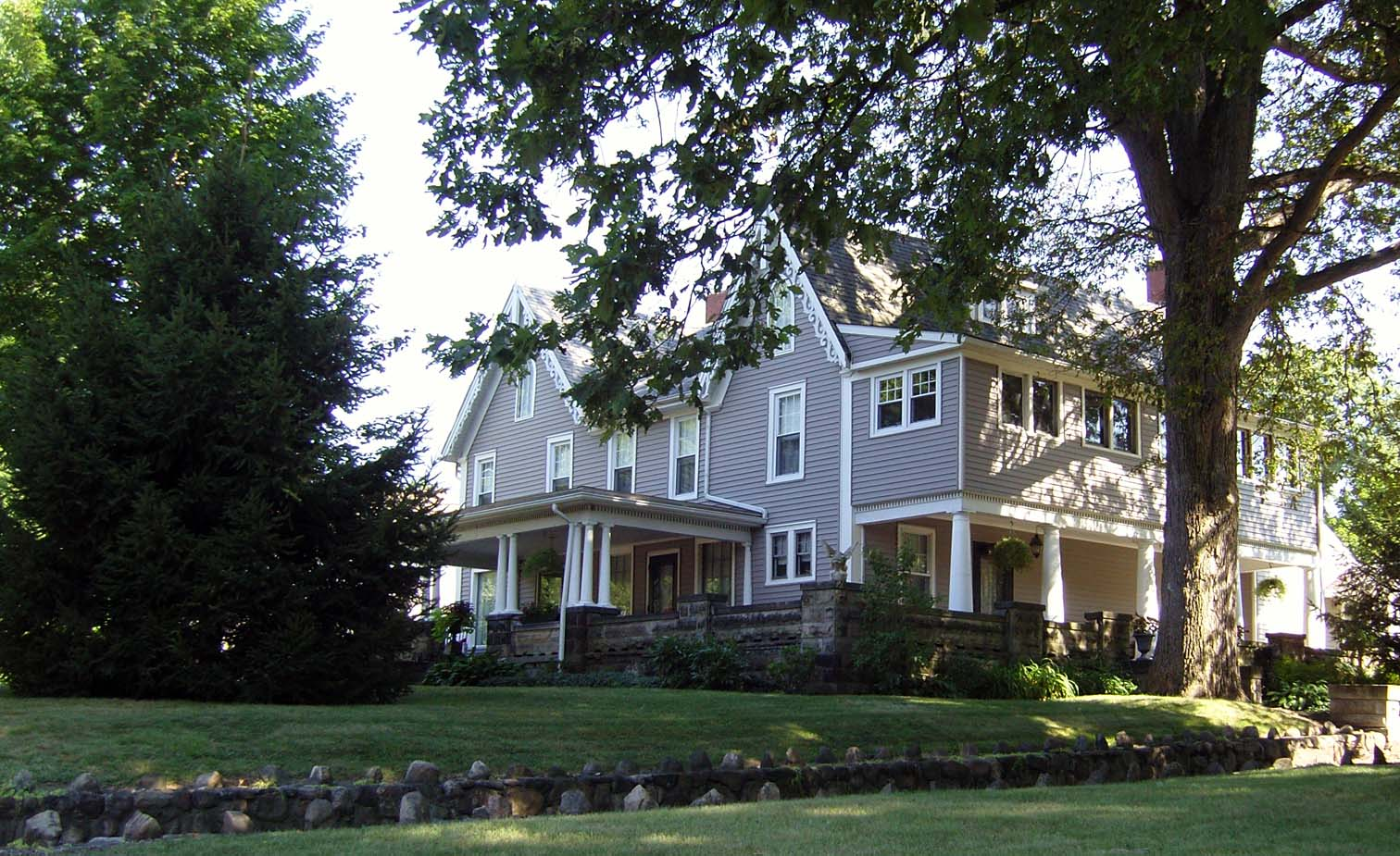
- Daniel Howell Hise House, Salem, Ohio

- Location within Ohio Location within the United States
- Location: 1100 Franklin Avenue; Salem, Ohio
- Coordinates: 40°53′32″N 80°50′32″W
- Built: 1838
- Architect: Daniel Howell Hise, Ben Hilman, and George Fleck
- Architectural style: Gothic Revival (exterior)
- NRHP reference No.: 99000319
- Added to NRHP: March 25, 1999

The Daniel Howell Hise House is an historic home that was part of the Underground Railroad. It is listed on the National Register of Historic Places and is located in Salem, Ohio.

== National Register-designated significance ==
The house is listed on the National Register for social and African-American history, as well as for the local notoriety of its namesake, Daniel Howell Hise.

== History and role in abolitionism ==
Built in 1838 by his father, the house was occupied by Hise and his wife Margaret in the 1850s, when they rechristened the home, Unserheim (“our home” in German), and made several alterations to the property, including construction of several hiding places for fleeing slaves. These renovations—including hidden rooms in the basement and a barn on the property—made the house a viable stop on the Underground Railroad.

Inspired by the words of Amos Gilbert, Daniel Hise served as a member of the Executive Committee of the Western Anti-slavery Society and helped organize the city of Salem's then-annual Anti-Slavery Fair (a local fundraiser for abolitionist causes). He strongly agreed with the philosophies of William Lloyd Garrison, and from 1849 to 1855, Hise made his home available to fleeing slaves as well as abolitionists including Oliver Johnson, Henry C. Wright, Parker Pillsbury, and Charles C. Burleigh.

== Daniel Howell Hise ==
Ohio Historical Marker, Daniel Howell Hise House, erected 2003.

Daniel Howell Hise was born in New Jersey on September 12, 1813, and moved with his family to Salem in 1819. In his youth, he worked as a steamboat engineer in Alabama during the summers, and he eventually found work in his adopted hometown in blacksmithing, toolmaking, roofing, and kiln operation.

Notably, Hise did not consider himself a “suitable leader for the reform movements in existence,” but rather acted as an ardent supporter of abolitionism, in addition to other causes like women's suffrage and temperance.

Hise kept a vivid diary from December 29, 1846, until his death on November 17, 1878. Published by a local book company in 1933 at the request of Hise's daughter, Nora, the entries have provided a window on the history of Salem and its role in the Underground Railroad.

== Legacy in American art ==
The American watercolorist Charles E. Burchfield featured the House in a painting made during his life in Salem.

== Current status ==
The Daniel Howell Hise House is a private residence, and is not open to the public.

== See also ==
- List of Underground Railroad sites
