= Salem, Ohio =

- City
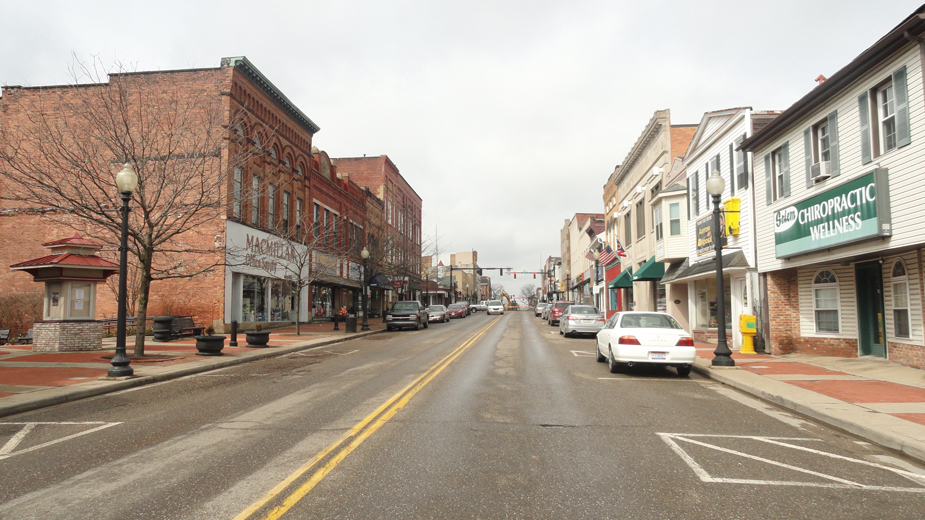
- Salem Downtown Historic District

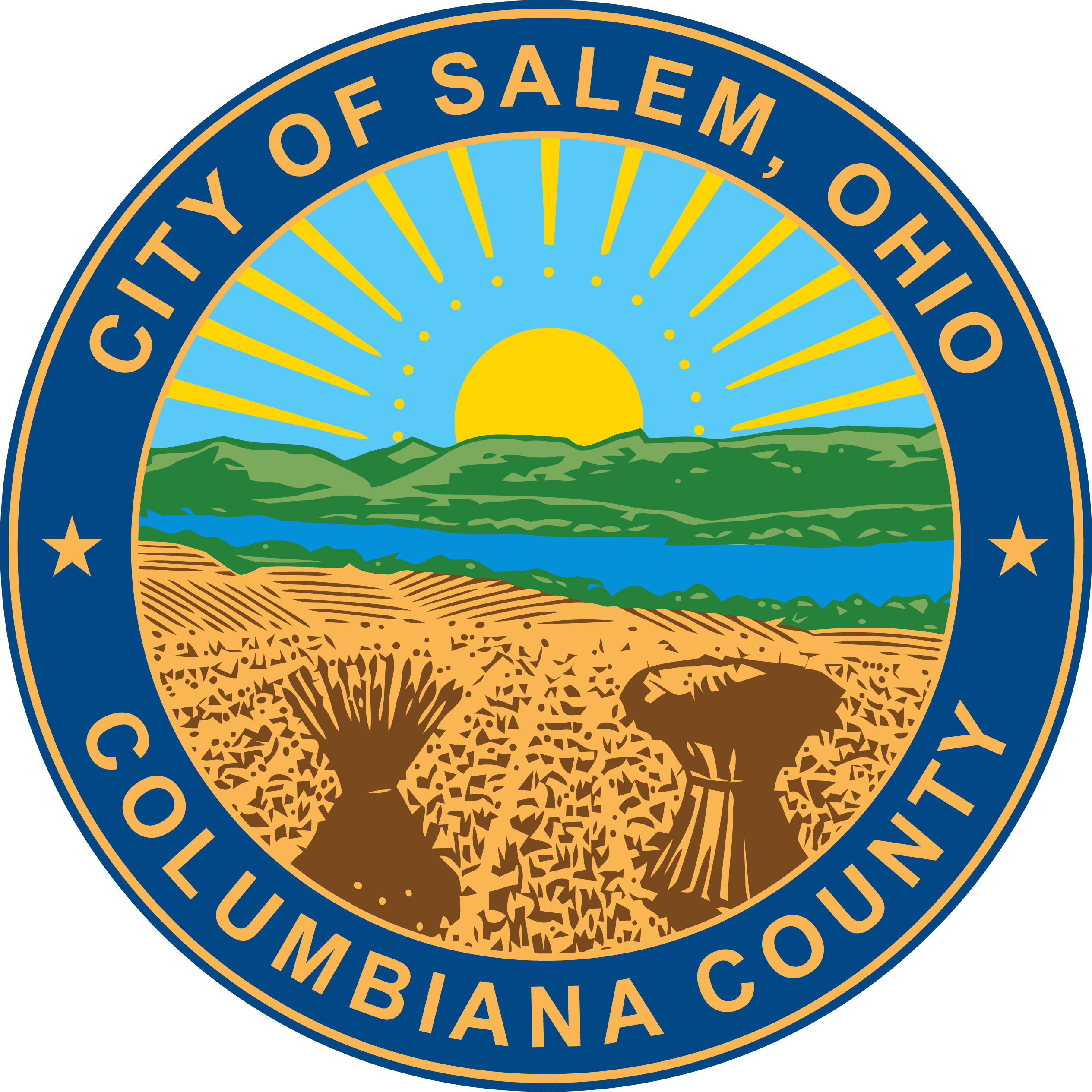
- Seal
- Interactive map of Salem, Ohio
- Location within Ohio Location within the United States
- Coordinates: 40°54′34″N 80°51′55″W
- Country: United States
- State: Ohio
- Counties: Columbiana, Mahoning
- Founded: 1806
- Named for: Salem, New Jersey

Government
  - Type: Statutory mayor-council
  - Body: Salem City Council
  - Mayor: Cyndi Baronzzi Dickey (R)
  - Council President: Evan Newman (R)

Area
  - Total: 6.43 sq mi (16.66 km^{2})
  - Land: 6.43 sq mi (16.66 km^{2})
  - Water: 0.0039 sq mi (0.01 km^{2})
- Elevation: 1,280 ft (390 m)

Population (2020)
  - Total: 11,915
  - Density: 1,852.9/sq mi (715.39/km^{2})
- Time zone: UTC-5 (EST)
  - Summer (DST): UTC-4 (EDT)
- ZIP code: 44460
- Area codes: 330, 234
- FIPS code: 39-69834
- GNIS feature ID: 2396524
- School District: Salem City SD
- Website: www.cityofsalemohio.org

Salem is a city in Columbiana County, Ohio, United States. The population was 11,915 at the 2020 census. It was founded by Quakers in 1806 and was a center of abolitionist activity as well as a station on the Underground Railroad. It is the principal city of the Salem micropolitan area, which comprises Columbiana County; a small portion of the city extends into Mahoning County.

== History ==
Salem was founded in 1806 by Zadok Street, a New Jersey clockmaker; and John Straughan, a Pennsylvanian potter. The city was named after Salem, New Jersey, Street's native community. The name Salem itself is a biblical derivative of Jerusalem in the Middle East, which means "city of peace". The city's early settlers included the Religious Society of Friends, also known as Quakers, which the local school district's sports teams honor by referring to themselves collectively as the Salem Quakers. (Note: The team nickname (and, possibly, the American tradition of placing the word "Fighting" in front of such nicknames) was noted by USA Today as one of several "that could be considered offensive".) Salem was incorporated in 1830.

Salem was a center of abolitionist and suffragist activity in the 19th century. The Anti-Slavery Bugle, an abolitionist newspaper, was published in Salem beginning in 1845. A local group of the Progressive Friends, an association of Quakers who separated from the main body partly to be freer to work for such causes as abolitionism and women's rights, formed in Salem in 1849. The local school board at that time was composed entirely of abolitionists. Salem was the site of an annual conference, the Anti-Slavery Fair, whose purpose was to raise money for anti-slavery activities. The Daniel Howell Hise House and John Street House were stops on the Underground Railroad.

In April 1850, Salem hosted the first Women's Rights Convention in Ohio, the third such convention in the United States (the first two being the Seneca Falls Convention and Rochester Women's Rights Convention of 1848). The Salem Convention was the first of these conventions to be organized on a statewide basis. All the convention officers were women. Men were not allowed to vote, sit on the platform, or speak during the convention. The male spectators were supportive, however, and when the convention was over, they created an organization of their own and endorsed the actions of the women's convention.

Advantageously located between Cleveland and Pittsburgh, Salem thrived on an industrial-based economy in the 19th and 20th centuries. For several decades, Salem's largest employers included American Standard Brands, Eljer, Mullins Manufacturing, Deming Pump, and Salem China. Today, American Standard retains production in the city, as well as the Fresh Mark meat production facility and several tool-and-die manufacturers.

== Geography ==
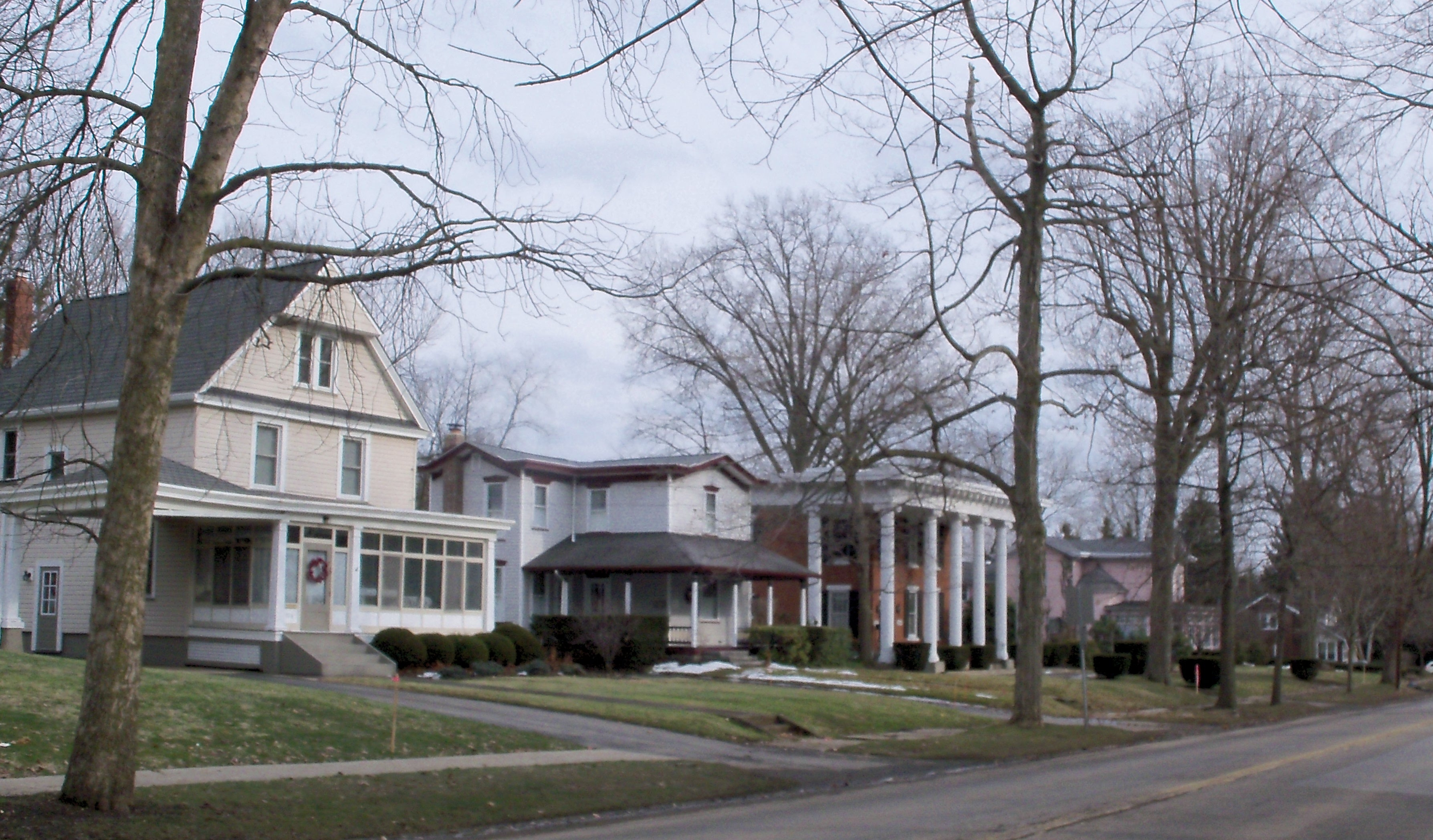
South Lincoln Avenue Historic District

Salem is located about 18 miles (29 km) southwest of Youngstown, 28 miles (45 km) east of Canton, and 60 miles (97 km) southeast of Cleveland. According to the United States Census Bureau, the city has an area of 6.43 square miles (16.65 km^{2}), all land. Salem is the largest incorporated place by area in Columbiana County.

The city is mostly surrounded by unincorporated Perry Township. Salem has annexed portions of Perry Township. Several acres of Salem Township and Green Township were annexed into the city limits in 2000 and 2001. Other actions to spur economic development undertaken around the same time annexed specific land: in 1999, 82.24 acres (332,800 m^{2}) of Salem Township were granted police and fire protection, snow removal service, and other city services. (Note: This is understood to cover the area including the Wal-Mart Supercenter.)

== Demographics ==
Historical population
Census	Pop.	Note	%±
1840	233		—
1850	842		261.4%
1860	1,889		124.3%
1870	3,700		95.9%
1880	4,041		9.2%
1890	5,780		43.0%
1900	7,582		31.2%
1910	8,943		18.0%
1920	10,305		15.2%
1930	10,622		3.1%
1940	12,301		15.8%
1950	12,754		3.7%
1960	13,854		8.6%
1970	14,186		2.4%
1980	12,865		−9.3%
1990	12,233		−4.9%
2000	12,197		−0.3%
2010	12,303		0.9%
2020	11,915		−3.2%

=== 2020 census ===
As of the 2020 census, Salem had a population of 11,915 and a median age of 43.0 years. 20.9% of residents were under the age of 18 and 22.2% of residents were 65 years of age or older. For every 100 females there were 95.5 males, and for every 100 females age 18 and over there were 92.0 males.

99.3% of residents lived in urban areas, while 0.7% lived in rural areas.

There were 5,151 households in Salem, of which 24.2% had children under the age of 18 living in them. Of all households, 38.2% were married-couple households, 21.3% were households with a male householder and no spouse or partner present, and 32.0% were households with a female householder and no spouse or partner present. About 37.1% of all households were made up of individuals and 17.3% had someone living alone who was 65 years of age or older.

There were 5,704 housing units, of which 9.7% were vacant. The homeowner vacancy rate was 2.7% and the rental vacancy rate was 8.7%.

Racial composition as of the 2020 census
Race	Number	Percent
White	10,606	89.0%
Black or African American	158	1.3%
American Indian and Alaska Native	160	1.3%
Asian	80	0.7%
Native Hawaiian and Other Pacific Islander	2	0.0%
Some other race	263	2.2%
Two or more races	646	5.4%
Hispanic or Latino (of any race)	574	4.8%

=== 2010 census ===
As of the census of 2010, there were 12,303 people, 5,272 households, and 3,118 families living in the city. The population density was 1,913.4 inhabitants per square mile (738.8/km^{2}). There were 5,763 housing units at an average density of 896.3 per square mile (346.1/km^{2}). The racial makeup of the city was 95.9% White, 0.7% African American, 0.2% Native American, 0.4% Asian, 1.6% from other races, and 1.2% from two or more races. Hispanic or Latino of any race were 2.5% of the population.

There were 5,272 households, of which 26.3% had children under the age of 18 living with them, 41.5% were married couples living together, 12.3% had a female householder with no husband present, 5.3% had a male householder with no wife present, and 40.9% were non-families. 34.9% of all households were made up of individuals, and 15.9% had someone living alone who was 65 years of age or older. The average household size was 2.25 and the average family size was 2.87.

The median age in the city was 42.8 years. 21.2% of residents were under the age of 18; 7.7% were between the ages of 18 and 24; 23.6% were from 25 to 44; 28.3% were from 45 to 64; and 19.1% were 65 years of age or older. The gender makeup of the city was 47.9% male and 52.1% female.

=== 2000 census ===
As of the census of 2000, there were 12,197 people, 5,146 households, and 3,247 families living in the city. The population density was 2,228.2 people per square mile (860.3 people/km^{2}). There were 5,505 housing units at an average density of 1,005.7 per square mile (388.3/km^{2}). The racial makeup of the city was 98.35% White, 0.52% African American, 0.09% Native American, 0.34% Asian, 0.02% Pacific Islander, 0.08% from other races, and 0.59% from two or more races. Hispanic or Latino of any race were 0.54% of the population.

There were 5,146 households, out of which 28.1% had children under the age of 18 living with them, 48.7% were married couples living together, 10.6% had a female householder with no husband present, and 36.9% were non-families. 32.8% of all households were made up of individuals, and 17.1% had someone living alone who was 65 years of age or older. The average household size was 2.31 and the average family size was 2.92.

In the city the population was spread out, with 22.8% under the age of 18, 8.1% from 18 to 24, 27.4% from 25 to 44, 21.6% from 45 to 64, and 20.1% who were 65 years of age or older. The median age was 40 years. For every 100 females, there were 84.9 males. For every 100 females age 18 and over, there were 81.0 males.

The median income for a household in the city was $30,006, and the median income for a family was $40,191. Males had a median income of $31,630 versus $19,471 for females. The per capita income for the city was $16,579. About 9.8% of families and 11.7% of the population were below the poverty line, including 17.9% of those under age 18 and 9.8% of those age 65 or over.

== Economy ==
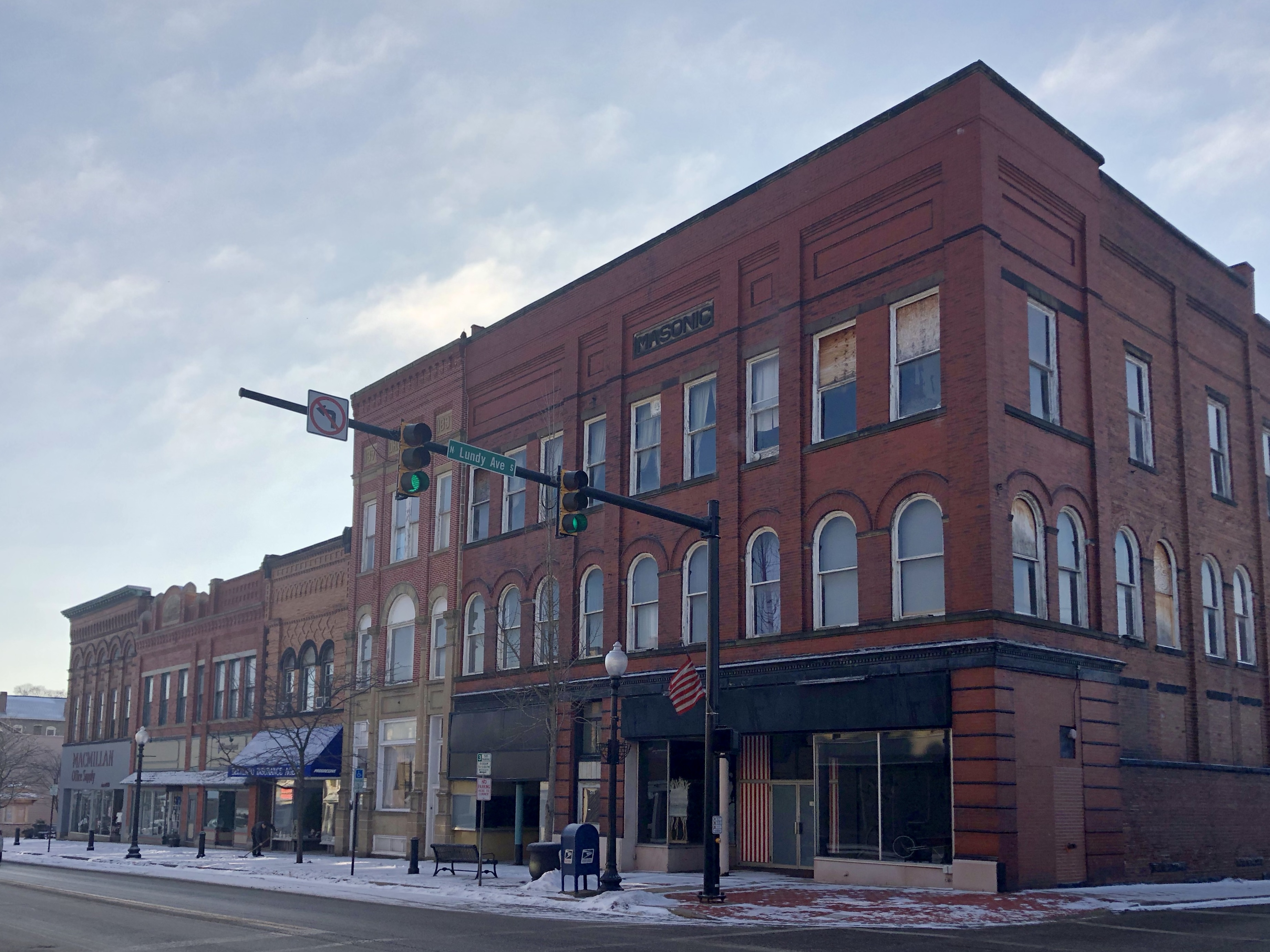
The corner of Lundy and State streets downtown

According to the Sustainable Opportunity Development Center in Salem, as of 2022, the top employers in the city are:

Employer	# of Employees
Ventra Salem	825
Fresh Mark, Inc.	775
Salem Regional Medical Center	761
Walmart	320
Butech Bliss	278
American Standard Brands	272
Salem City School District	222
Hickey Metal Fabrication	176
MAC Manufacturing	172

== Arts and culture ==
Two neighborhoods of the city are designated as National Register historic districts: the South Lincoln Avenue Historic District (designated 1993) and the Salem Downtown Historic District (designated 1995), which includes several of the town's monumental and architecturally distinctive homes and businesses. Other city properties listed on the National Register of Historic Places include the Burchfield Homestead, home to painter Charles E. Burchfield from ages 5 to 28; the Daniel Howell Hise House and John Street House, both Underground Railroad stations; and the First United Methodist Church.

== Government ==
Salem operates under a statutory mayor–council government. As of 2026, the mayor is Cyndi Baronzzi Dickey (R) and the council president is Evan Newman (R). There are eight council members, most of whom are elected for staggered four-year terms. The city council constitutes four separate wards, three at-large districts, and a council president. The council president is elected instead for a two-year term. The independently elected mayor serves as an executive. The mayor, auditor, treasurer, and law director are all elected to four-year terms.

== Education ==
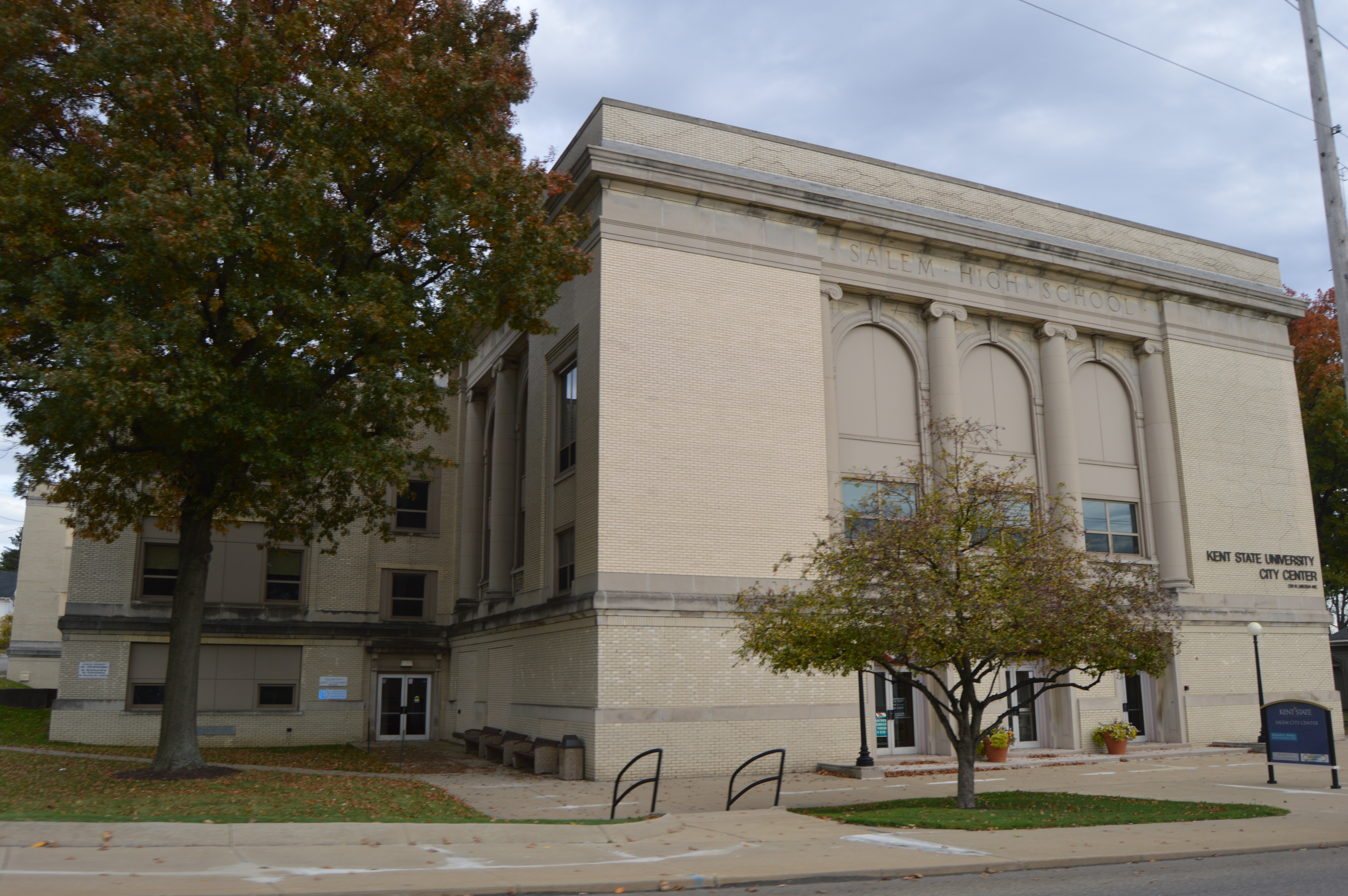
The former Salem High School building is now used by Kent State University at Salem.

Children in Salem are served by the public Salem City School District, which includes three elementary schools, one junior high school, and Salem Senior High School. (Note: NCES district 3910006) The Roman Catholic Diocese of Youngstown operates the private St. Paul Elementary School for grades K-8.

Allegheny Wesleyan College is a private, four-year liberal arts college in Salem that grants bachelor's and associate degrees in ministry and theology-related disciplines.

Kent State University operates a satellite campus, Kent State University at Salem, with one building in the city proper and another just outside the city limits in Salem Township. The campus grants associate's degrees and bachelor's degrees, and also offers introductory programs that can be completed at the main campus.

== Transportation ==
U.S. Route 62 travels around downtown Salem on an east–west route. State Route 9 runs north–south through the city and terminates at its intersection with U.S. 62. State Route 14 travels east–west through Salem, sharing a short concurrency with SR 9 and State Route 173 on State Street. SR 173's eastern terminus is in downtown Salem and travels east–west to Alliance. State Route 344's western terminus is also in downtown Salem and travels east–west to Columbiana.

Salem Airpark is a public use airport located three nautical miles (6 km) north of the central business district of Salem, Ohio.

== Notable people ==
- Dustin Bates, lead singer and songwriter for Starset and formerly Downplay
- Chalkley Beeson, businessman, musician, lawman, and owner of Long Branch Saloon
- Charles Burchfield, 20th-century painter and visionary artist
- John Allen Campbell, first governor of the Wyoming Territory
- Jason Candle, NCAA football coach for the Toledo Rockets
- Joe Daley, jazz saxophonist, composer, and teacher
- Max Fisher, businessman and philanthropist, served as an advisor to U.S. Presidents for Israeli connections
- Alan Freed, disc jockey who coined the term "rock and roll"
- Tim Ginter, Columbiana County commissioner and former member of the Ohio House of Representatives
- Sarah Elizabeth Mitchell Guernsey, president general of the Daughters of the American Revolution
- Daniel Howell Hise, diarist and abolitionist whose home was on the Underground Railroad
- Caleb Hunt, co-founder of the Monongahela and Ohio Steam Boat Company
- Elisha Hunt, principal founder of the Monongahela and Ohio Steam Boat Company
- Rich Karlis, National Football League placekicker
- Kirk Lowdermilk, National Football League center
- Jerry Meals, Major League Baseball umpire
- Jerri Nielsen, physician who administered a biopsy and chemotherapy to herself in Antarctica
- John Hunt Painter, Quaker abolitionist who sent the firearms to John Brown for the raid on Harper's Ferry
- Marius Robinson, minister, abolitionist and editor of The Anti-Slavery Bugle
- Michael Rulli, member of the U.S. House of Representatives from Ohio's 6th district; former member of the Ohio Senate
- Webster Street, lawyer who served as chief justice of the Arizona Territorial Supreme Court
- Charles C. Williamson, librarian
- Lloyd Yoder, NCAA football tackle and College Football Hall of Fame inductee

== See also ==
- USS Salem (CM-11)
