= Millport, Columbiana County, Ohio =

Millport, Ohio
- Unincorporated community
- Location within Ohio Location within the United States
- Country: United States
- State: Ohio
- County: Columbiana
- Township: Franklin
- Elevation: 1,089 ft (332 m)
- Time zone: UTC-5 (Eastern (EST))
  - Summer (DST): UTC-4 (EDT)
- ZIP code: 44427
- Area codes: 330, 234
- GNIS feature ID: 1061525

Millport is an unincorporated community in Franklin Township, Columbiana County, Ohio, United States. It lies just north of the village of Summitville in the southwestern part of the county, at the intersection of Ohio State Route 644 and 518.

== History ==
Millport was platted in 1853, and named for the sawmill and gristmill at the town site. A post office called Millport was established in 1861, and remained in operation until 1929.
