= Ohio State Route 518 =

State highway in Columbiana County, Ohio, US

State Route 518

Route information
- Maintained by ODOT
- Length: 11.10 mi (17.86 km)
- Existed: 1937–present

Major junctions
- West end: SR 644 near Summitville
- East end: US 30 / SR 45 near West Point

Location
- Country: United States
- State: Ohio
- Counties: Columbiana

Highway system
- Ohio State Highway System; Interstate; US; State; Scenic
← SR 517	→ SR 519

State Route 518 (SR 518) is an east–west state highway located entirely in Columbiana County in northeast Ohio. The western terminus of SR 518 is at SR 644 north of Summitville. Its eastern terminus is at the concurrency of U.S. Route 30 (US 30) and SR 45 near West Point.

Originally created in the late 1930s, SR 518 runs through rural portions of Columbiana County. It passes through scattered small unincorporated communities along the way.

== Route description ==
SR 518 begins at an intersection with SR 644 in Franklin Township within the unincorporated community of Millport. This stop-controlled T-intersection is located 1.5 miles (2.4 km) north of Summitville. The route heads east and immediately crosses over a small stream before paralleling the Brush Creek and passing through agricultural lands. Shortly after entering Wayne Township, the route makes a sharp curve to the right at an intersection with Gavers Road (County Road 407). SR 518 crosses over the West Fork of the Little Beaver Creek before that creek merges with the Branch Creek; the former now parallels SR 518 for the remainder of the route. After passing the New Lebanon Church, the route descends into a small valley where it passes over a culvert carrying a tributary of the Little Beaver Creek. To the north of the route in this valley is an old alignment of SR 518 that was bypassed c. 1999.

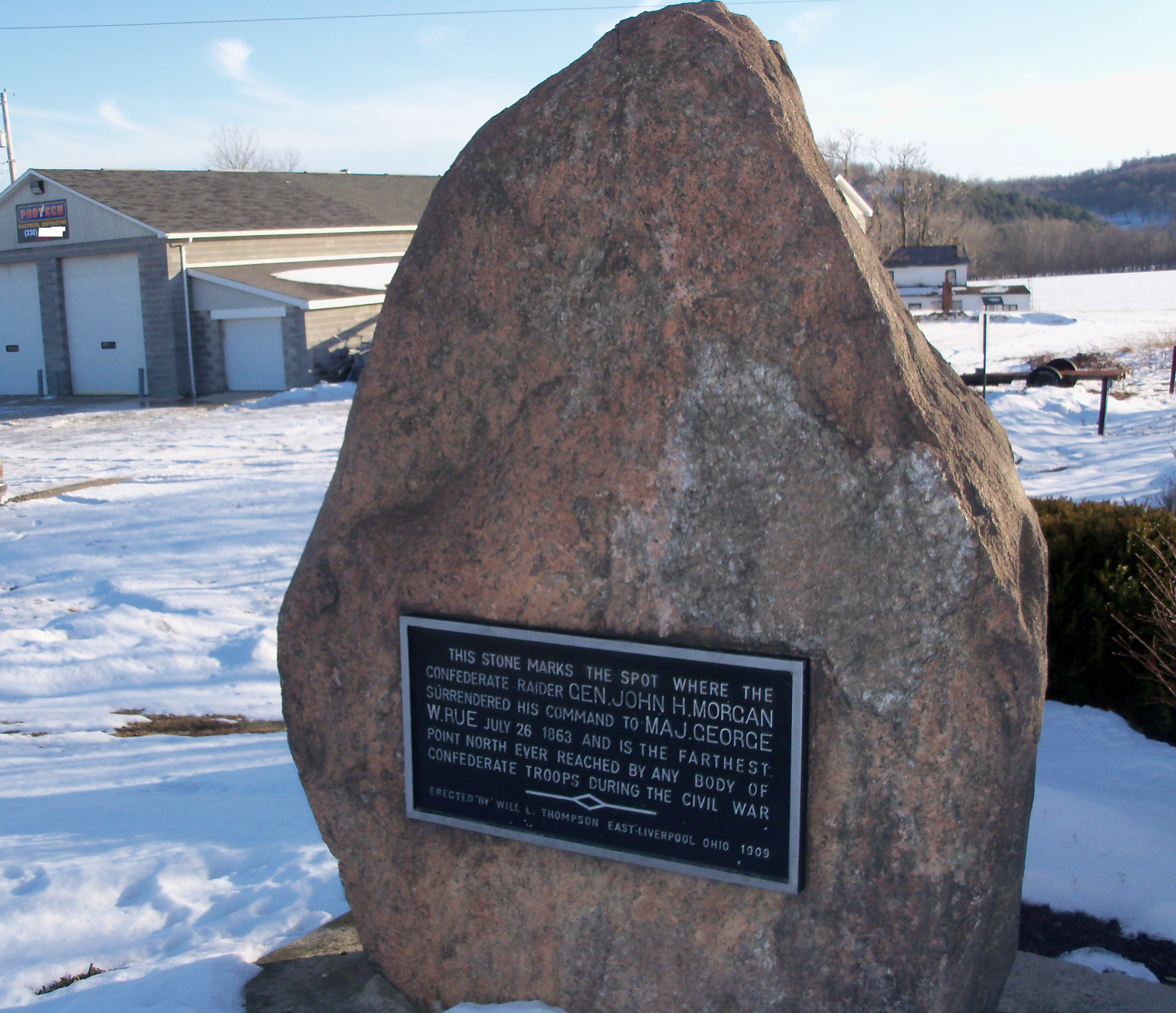
Commemorative monument at the site of John Hunt Morgan's surrender during the Civil War

Within the community of Gavers, SR 164 comes in from the south and joins SR 518 to form a 0.4-mile-long (0.64 km) concurrency. After the brief concurrency, SR 518 continues east still paralleling the West Fork Little Beaver Creek as it passes through more farmland with occasional forested areas. At the border of Wayne and Madison Townships, SR 518 passes an abandoned rest area and intersects Black Road. Just past this intersection, there is a monument commemorating the location of the surrender of Gen. John Hunt Morgan during the Civil War. Continuing east through more forested land, the route enters the community of West Point. In the community, SR 518 makes an S-curve at High Street before continuing northeast to an intersection with County Road 448-A. At this intersection, SR 518 turns to the northwest and travels for about 1/2 mile (0.80 km) before ending at a T-intersection with US 30 and SR 45.

== History ==
SR 518 was designated in 1937 along most of the routing that it currently occupies. Originally, SR 518 ended near the present-day SR 518–CR 448-A intersection in West Point; what is now CR 448-A and SR 518 between here and US 30 was SR 45. When SR 45 was moved to an alignment that intersected US 30 near the modern-day SR 11 freeway interchange in 1974, SR 518 was extended north 0.5 miles (0.80 km) to end at its current eastern terminus. Around 1999, sharp curves in the route west of Gavers were eliminated when a straighter alignment was built through a stream valley; the old alignment of SR 518 became designated SR 518-J indicating that the road was awaiting abandonment by Ohio Department of Transportation (ODOT). There were no driveways along it and was gated off from public travel though it was state-maintained until 2014.

In 1958, ODOT built a rest area at mile marker 7.72 (12.42 km) commemorating the site of the surrender of John Hunt Morgan, the northernmost location Confederate troops advanced during the Civil War. A monument created in 1909 was moved to this rest area when the state could not acquire the property on which the actual surrender happened. The small rest area would remain until 1999 when the site was abandoned by ODOT due to a lack of a septic system for the restrooms. The monument was moved east 0.25 miles (0.40 km) near the actual site of the surrender in 2004.

== Major intersections ==
The entire route is in Columbiana County.

Location	mi	km	Destinations	Notes
Franklin Township	0.00	0.00	SR 644 – Kensington, Summitville	
Wayne Township	4.36– 4.39	7.02– 7.07	SR 164 south – Salineville	Western end of SR 164 concurrency
Wayne Township	4.80	7.72	SR 164 north – Lisbon	Eastern end of SR 164 concurrency
Madison Township	11.10	17.86	US 30 / SR 45 to SR 11 – Lisbon, East Liverpool	
1.000 mi = 1.609 km; 1.000 km = 0.621 mi: Concurrency terminus
