= Middleton Township, Columbiana County, Ohio =

Township in Ohio, US

- Township
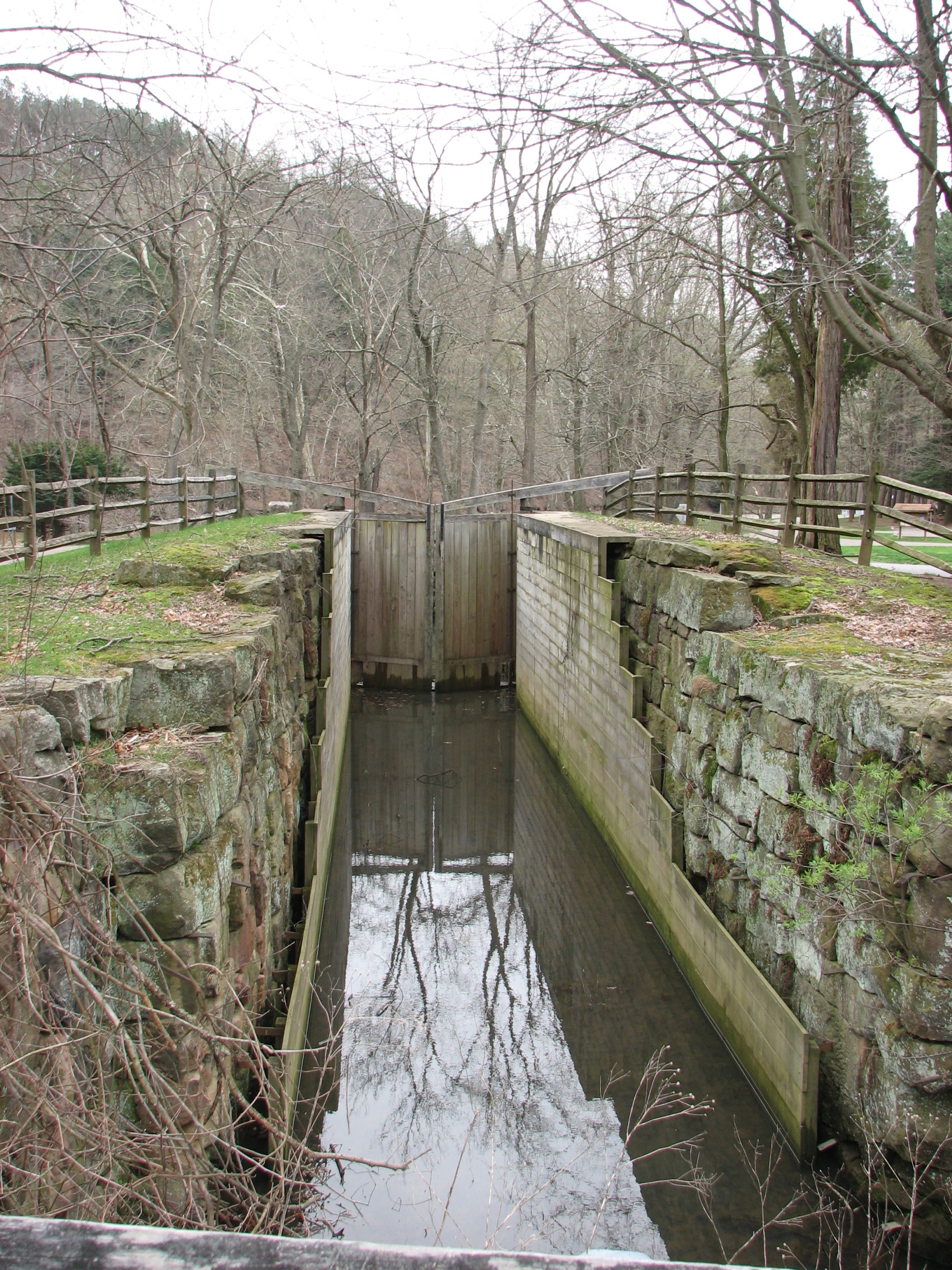
- Lock No. 36, Sandy and Beaver Canal

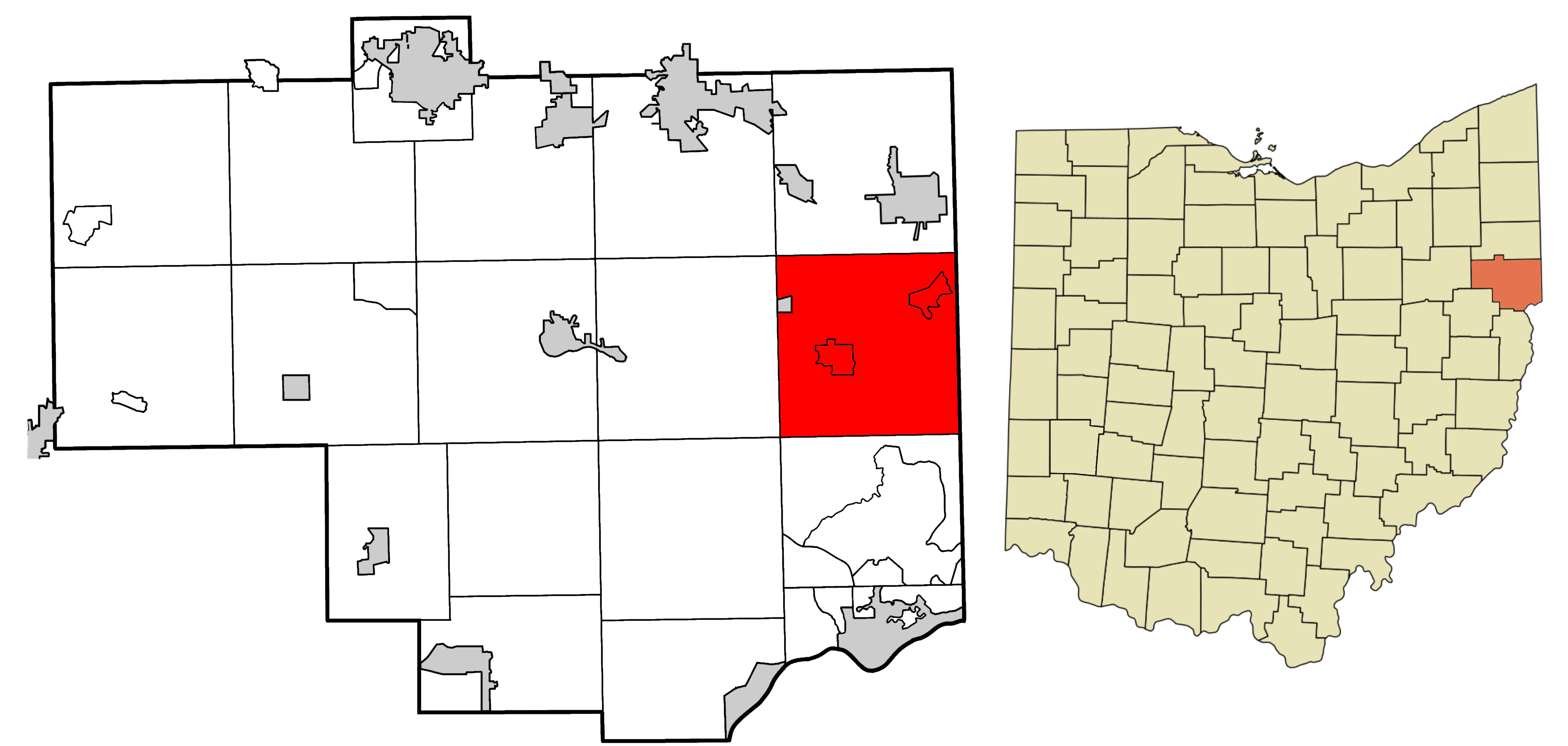
- Location of Middleton Township in Columbiana County
- Coordinates: 40°47′0″N 80°34′46″W
- Country: United States
- State: Ohio
- County: Columbiana

Area
  - Total: 35.4 sq mi (91.7 km^{2})
  - Land: 35.2 sq mi (91.1 km^{2})
  - Water: 0.23 sq mi (0.6 km^{2})
- Elevation: 1,142 ft (348 m)

Population (2020)
  - Total: 3,359
  - Density: 95.5/sq mi (36.9/km^{2})
- Time zone: UTC-5 (Eastern (EST))
  - Summer (DST): UTC-4 (EDT)
- FIPS code: 39-49784
- GNIS feature ID: 1085899

Middleton Township is one of the eighteen townships of Columbiana County, Ohio, United States. The 2020 census reported 3,359 people living in the township.

== Geography ==
Located in the eastern part of the county, it borders the following townships and borough:

- Unity Township – north
- Darlington Township, Beaver County, Pennsylvania – northeast
- South Beaver Township, Pennsylvania – east
- Ohioville, Pennsylvania – southeast
- St. Clair Township – south
- Madison Township – southwest corner
- Elkrun Township – west
- Fairfield Township – northwest corner

One village, two CDPs, and four unincorporated communities are located in Middleton Township:

- The village of Rogers, in the northwest
- The census-designated place of Lake Tomahawk, in the center
- The census-designated place of Negley, in the northeast
- The unincorporated community of Achor, in the east
- The unincorporated community of Clarkson, in the southwest
- The unincorporated community of East Carmel, in the west
- The unincorporated community of Mill Rock, in the north

== Name and history ==
Historical population
Census	Pop.	Note	%±
1980	3,426		—
1990	3,422		−0.1%
2000	3,741		9.3%
2010	3,612		−3.4%
2020	3,359		−7.0%

Statewide, the only other Middleton Township is located in Wood County.

The township was among the first organized in the county in 1803.

== Parks and recreation ==
A portion of Beaver Creek State Park is located in the township.

== Government ==
The township is governed by a three-member board of trustees, who are elected in November of odd-numbered years to a four-year term beginning on the following January 1. Two are elected in the year after the presidential election and one is elected in the year before it. There is also an elected township fiscal officer, who serves a four-year term beginning on April 1 of the year after the election, which is held in November of the year before the presidential election. Vacancies in the fiscal officership or on the board of trustees are filled by the remaining trustees.

As of 2020, the township trustees and fiscal officer are:

=== Township trustees ===
- Nancy Micheals, chairwoman
- Gregory A. Lipp, vice chairman
- Tim Pancake

=== Fiscal officer ===
- Robert Chapman
