= Millport =

Millport may refer to:

- Millport, Cumbrae, a town on the island of Cumbrae in North Ayrshire, Scotland
- Millport, Alabama, a small town in Alabama, United States
- Millport, New York, a village in New York, United States
- Millport, Indiana, an unincorporated community in Washington County
- Millport, Missouri, an unincorporated community
- Millport, Columbiana County, Ohio, an unincorporated community
- Millport, Pickaway County, Ohio, an unincorporated community
- Millport (radio show), a BBC radio show about the Scottish town
- Millport (album), a 2017 album by Greg Graffin
