= Moultrie =

Moultrie may refer to:

- Moultrie (name)
- Moultrie, Georgia, a city
- Moultrie, Ohio, an unincorporated community
- Moultrie County, Illinois
- Fort Moultrie, a series of citadels on Sullivan's Island, South Carolina, built to protect the city of Charleston
