= Teegarden =

Teegarden may refer to:

- Teegarden, Indiana
- Teegarden, Ohio
- Teegarden's Star
- Teegarden & Van Winkle
- Teegarden (surname)
