= Achor (disambiguation) =

Achor is a valley in the vicinity of Jericho. Achor may also refer to:

- Harold Achor (1907–1967), Justice of the Indiana Supreme Court
- Shawn Achor (born 1978), American author and speaker
- Achor, Ohio, unincorporated community in Columbiana County, Ohio
