= Hiram Bell (disambiguation) =

Hiram Bell may refer to:

- Hiram Bell (1808–1855), U.S. Representative from Ohio's Third Congressional District
- Hiram Parks Bell (1827–1907), U.S. Representative and Confederate Representative from the state of Georgia

== See also ==
- Hiram Bell Farmstead, a historic house in Fairfield Township, Ohio
