= Summitville =

Summitville may refer to some places in the United States:

- Summitville, Indiana
- Summitville, New York
- Summitville, Ohio
- Summitville mine, in Colorado
