= Center Township, Columbiana County, Ohio =

Township in Ohio, US

- Township
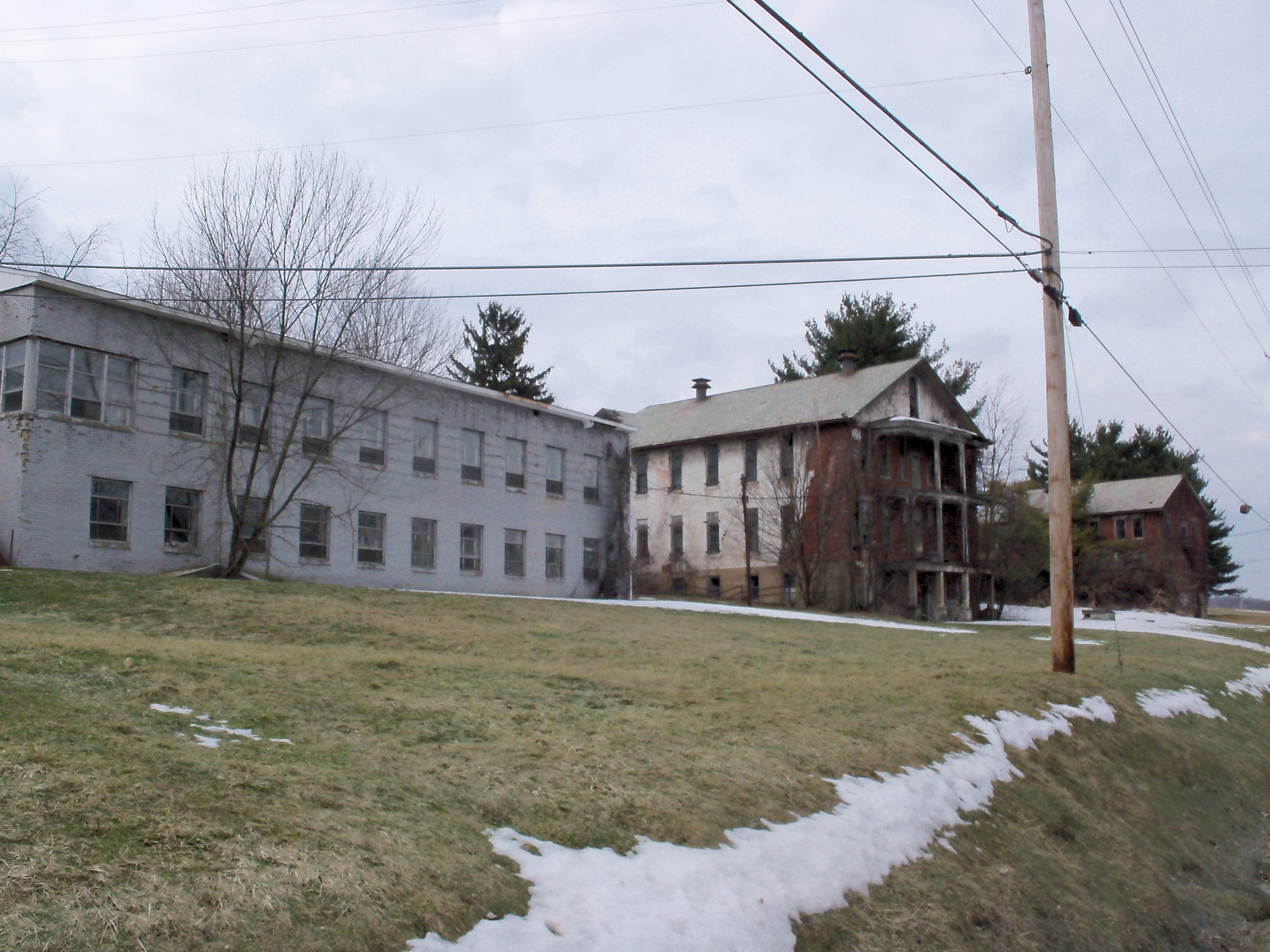
- Columbiana County Infirmary

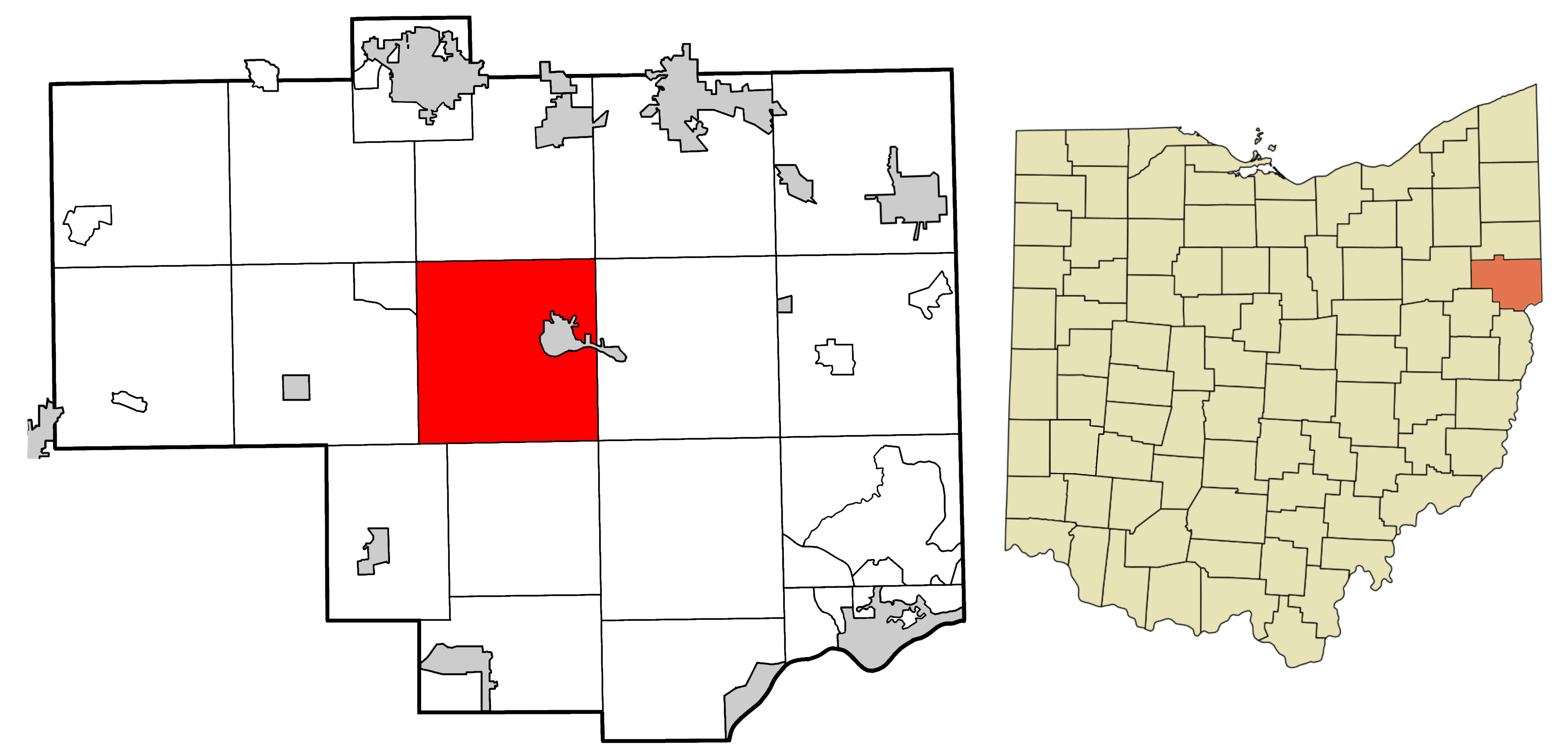
- Location of Center Township in Columbiana County
- Coordinates: 40°46′29″N 80°46′49″W
- Country: United States
- State: Ohio
- County: Columbiana

Area
  - Total: 35.5 sq mi (92.0 km^{2})
  - Land: 35.3 sq mi (91.5 km^{2})
  - Water: 0.19 sq mi (0.5 km^{2})
- Elevation: 1,086 ft (331 m)

Population (2020)
  - Total: 5,793
  - Density: 164/sq mi (63.3/km^{2})
- Time zone: UTC-5 (Eastern (EST))
  - Summer (DST): UTC-4 (EDT)
- FIPS code: 39-12910
- GNIS feature ID: 1085890
- Website: https://www.centertwpohio.us/

Center Township is one of the eighteen townships of Columbiana County, Ohio, United States. The 2020 census reported 5,793 people living in the township.

== Geography ==
Located in the center of the county, it borders the following townships:

- Salem Township - north
- Fairfield Township - northeast corner
- Elkrun Township - east
- Madison Township - southeast corner
- Wayne Township - south
- Franklin Township - southwest
- Hanover Township - west
- Butler Township - northwest corner

One village is located in Center Township:

- The county seat and village of Lisbon, in the east

== Name and history ==
Historical population
Census	Pop.	Note	%±
1980	6,549		—
1990	6,235		−4.8%
2000	6,473		3.8%
2010	6,313		−2.5%
2020	5,793		−8.2%

It is one of nine Center Townships statewide. The township was among the first organized in the county in 1803. Center Township was named from its central position in Columbiana County.

== Government ==
The township is governed by a three-member board of trustees, who are elected in November of odd-numbered years to a four-year term beginning on the following January 1. Two are elected in the year after the presidential election and one is elected in the year before it. There is also an elected township fiscal officer, who serves a four-year term beginning on April 1 of the year after the election, which is held in November of the year before the presidential election. Vacancies in the fiscal officership or on the board of trustees are filled by the remaining trustees.

=== Township Trustees ===
- Greg Shive, Chairman
- Rexford Underwood
- Tim Novak

=== Fiscal Officer ===
- Rebecca Tolson
