= Columbiana County, Ohio =

County in Ohio, United States

- County
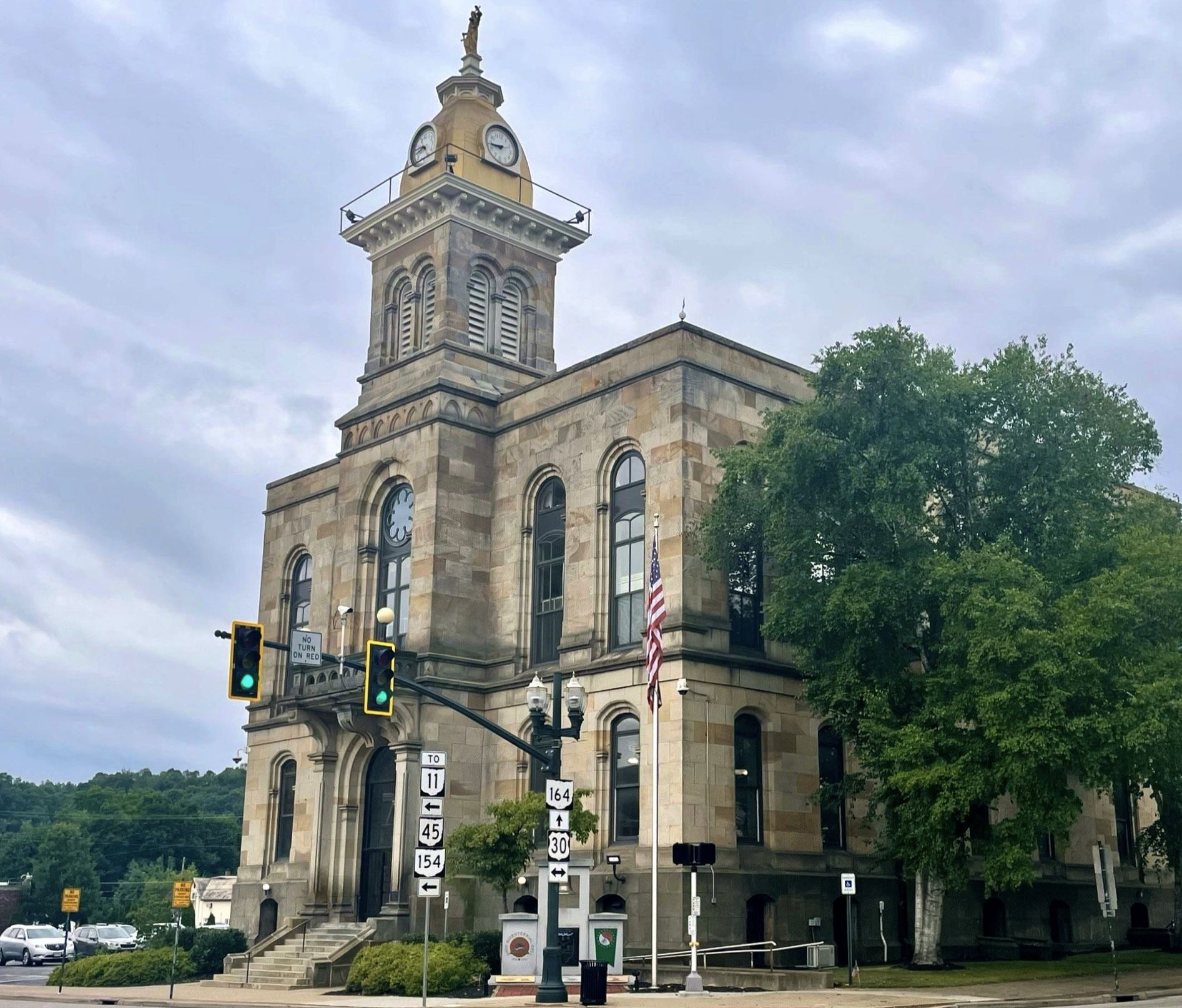
- Columbiana County Courthouse

- Seal

- Location within the U.S. state of Ohio
- Coordinates: 40°46′N 80°47′W
- Country: United States
- State: Ohio
- Founded: May 1, 1803
- Named for: Christopher Columbus
- Seat: Lisbon
- Largest city: Salem

Area
  - Total: 535 sq mi (1,390 km^{2})
  - Land: 532 sq mi (1,380 km^{2})
  - Water: 2.8 sq mi (7.3 km^{2}) 0.5%

Population (2020)
  - Total: 101,877
  - Estimate (2025): 99,377 ▼
  - Density: 190/sq mi (73/km^{2})
- Time zone: UTC−5 (Eastern)
  - Summer (DST): UTC−4 (EDT)
- Congressional district: 6th
- Website: www.columbianacounty.org

Columbiana County is located in the U.S. state of Ohio. As of the 2020 census, the population was 101,877. The county seat is Lisbon and its largest city is Salem. Created in 1803, the county name is derived from that of 15th-century Italian explorer Christopher Columbus.

Columbiana County is predominantly rural and considered part of Appalachian Ohio. While northern communities are more associated with Northeast Ohio, southern communities along the Ohio River are culturally closer to the Upper Ohio Valley region. Columbiana County comprises the Salem, Ohio micropolitan statistical area, which is also included in the larger Youngstown–Warren–Salem combined statistical area. Officially considered part of the Youngstown media market, stations from Steubenville regularly report in the area as well.

== History ==
The principal historic Native American peoples in the area were the Lenape, Mingo, and Wyandot. The Wyandot had an encampment where the city of Salem now stands. Several important indigenous trails ran through the county, the most important being the Great Trail which ran through the southern parts of the county towards Sandusky. Throughout the second half of the 18th century, starting with Christopher Gist in 1750, American colonists explored the area as the Ohio Company surveyed. George Washington, while engaged in land examinations, camped in the area of present-day East Liverpool in October 1770.

In the 1780s, the Native Americans relinquished control of the area, and the region was surveyed in accordance with the Land Ordinance of 1785. The ensuing Public Land Survey System of the United States started by surveyor Thomas Hutchins on north bank of the Ohio River in present-day East Liverpool resulted in the Seven Ranges, believed to be "the first mathematically designed system and nationally conducted cadastral survey in any modern country."

The first permanent settlement in the area was in 1792 or 1793, by hunter John Quinn, who settled in St. Clair Township near present-day Calcutta. Columbiana County was founded in 1803 and named in honor of Christopher Columbus, combining his surname with the suffix -iana. It was settled early on by Quakers and Scotch-Irish from Pennsylvania, but was later settled primary by Germans. The county was the scene of one of the northernmost action fought during the American Civil War; on July 26, 1863, Confederate raiders under John Hunt Morgan were surrounded and captured by Union Army forces at the Battle of Salineville.

The county was home to the largest pottery industry in the world, in East Liverpool and surrounding communities, which produced more than half of the United States' annual ceramics output. Throughout East Liverpool's ceramics history, there were more than 300 potteries. Other chief industries included iron and brick making, as well as transportation via the Ohio River, Sandy and Beaver Canal, and Pennsylvania Railroad system.

The East Palestine, Ohio, train derailment occurred on February 3, 2023. A freight train containing hazardous materials including vinyl chloride derailed in East Palestine. After burning for more than two days, emergency crews conducted a controlled burn of the train's contents, releasing toxic hydrogen chloride and phosgene into the air, and contaminating the Ohio River.

== Geography ==
According to the U.S. Census Bureau, the county has a total area of 535 square miles (1,390 km^{2}), of which 532 square miles (1,380 km^{2}) is land and 2.8 square miles (7.3 km^{2}) (0.5%) is water.

The Little Beaver Creek watershed is home to Beaver Creek State Forest, Beaver Creek State Park, and Sheepskin Hollow State Nature Preserve. Yellow Creek State Forest is in the southern part of the county.

=== Adjacent counties ===
- Mahoning County (north)
- Lawrence County, Pennsylvania (northeast)
- Beaver County, Pennsylvania (east)
- Hancock County, West Virginia (southeast)
- Jefferson County (south)
- Carroll County (southwest)
- Stark County (west)

== Demographics ==
Historical population
Census	Pop.	Note	%±
1810	10,878		—
1820	22,033		102.5%
1830	35,592		61.5%
1840	40,378		13.4%
1850	33,621		−16.7%
1860	32,836		−2.3%
1870	38,299		16.6%
1880	48,602		26.9%
1890	59,029		21.5%
1900	68,590		16.2%
1910	76,619		11.7%
1920	83,131		8.5%
1930	86,484		4.0%
1940	90,121		4.2%
1950	98,920		9.8%
1960	107,004		8.2%
1970	108,310		1.2%
1980	113,572		4.9%
1990	108,276		−4.7%
2000	112,075		3.5%
2010	107,841		−3.8%
2020	101,877		−5.5%
2025 (est.)	99,377	▼	−2.5%
U.S. Decennial Census; 1790–1960 1900–1990; 1990–2000 2020

Map showing 2012 Appalachian Regional Commission economic designations for Appalachian Ohio, with Columbiana County marked as "transitional".

=== 2020 census ===
As of the 2020 census, the county had a population of 101,877. The median age was 45.1 years. 20.2% of residents were under the age of 18 and 21.5% of residents were 65 years of age or older. For every 100 females there were 101.8 males, and for every 100 females age 18 and over there were 101.1 males age 18 and over.

The racial makeup of the county was 92.4% White, 2.1% Black or African American, 0.3% American Indian and Alaska Native, 0.3% Asian, <0.1% Native Hawaiian and Pacific Islander, 0.6% from some other race, and 4.2% from two or more races. Hispanic or Latino residents of any race comprised 1.7% of the population.

44.5% of residents lived in urban areas, while 55.5% lived in rural areas.

There were 41,706 households in the county, of which 26.0% had children under the age of 18 living in them. Of all households, 47.2% were married-couple households, 19.2% were households with a male householder and no spouse or partner present, and 26.1% were households with a female householder and no spouse or partner present. About 30.2% of all households were made up of individuals and 14.2% had someone living alone who was 65 years of age or older.

There were 46,091 housing units, of which 9.5% were vacant. Among occupied housing units, 72.8% were owner-occupied and 27.2% were renter-occupied. The homeowner vacancy rate was 1.7% and the rental vacancy rate was 8.6%.

=== Racial and ethnic composition ===
Columbiana County, Ohio – Racial and ethnic composition Note: the US Census treats Hispanic/Latino as an ethnic category. This table excludes Latinos from the racial categories and assigns them to a separate category. Hispanics/Latinos may be of any race.
Race / ethnicity (NH = Non-Hispanic)	Pop 1980	Pop 1990	Pop 2000	Pop 2010	Pop 2020	% 1980	% 1990	% 2000	% 2010	% 2020
White alone (NH)	111,322	106,057	107,045	102,326	93,466	98.02%	97.95%	95.51%	94.89%	91.74%
Black or African American alone (NH)	1,400	1,406	2,423	2,323	2,082	1.23%	1.30%	2.16%	2.15%	2.04%
Native American or Alaska Native alone (NH)	132	165	178	164	161	0.12%	0.15%	0.16%	0.15%	0.16%
Asian alone (NH)	200	215	248	319	345	0.18%	0.20%	0.22%	0.30%	0.34%
Native Hawaiian or Pacific Islander alone (NH)	x	x	17	20	16	x	x	0.02%	0.02%	0.02%
Other race alone (NH)	105	28	45	55	217	0.09%	0.03%	0.04%	0.05%	0.21%
Mixed race or Multiracial (NH)	x	x	810	1,286	3,838	x	x	0.72%	1.19%	3.77%
Hispanic or Latino (any race)	413	405	1,309	1,348	1,752	0.36%	0.37%	1.17%	1.25%	1.72%
Total	113,572	108,276	112,075	107,841	101,877	100.00%	100.00%	100.00%	100.00%	100.00%

=== 2010 census ===
As of the 2010 United States census, there were 107,841 people, 42,683 households, and 29,101 families residing in the county. The population density was 202.7 inhabitants per square mile (78.3/km^{2}). There were 47,088 housing units at an average density of 88.5 units per square mile (34.2 units/km^{2}). The racial makeup of the county was 95.5% white, 2.2% black or African American, 0.3% Asian, 0.2% American Indian, 0.5% from other races, and 1.3% from two or more races. Those of Hispanic or Latino origin made up 1.2% of the population. In terms of ancestry, 29.2% were German, 17.7% were Irish, 14.6% were English, 9.1% were Italian, and 7.6% were American.

Of the 42,683 households, 29.8% had children under the age of 18 living with them, 51.4% were married couples living together, 11.5% had a female householder with no husband present, 31.8% were non-families, and 26.8% of all households were made up of individuals. The average household size was 2.43 and the average family size was 2.92. The median age was 42.3 years.

The median income for a household in the county was $39,502 and the median income for a family was $48,948. Males had a median income of $39,614 versus $27,179 for females. The per capita income for the county was $19,635. About 12.1% of families and 16.0% of the population were below the poverty line, including 25.6% of those under age 18 and 6.4% of those age 65 or over.

=== 2000 census ===
As of the census of 2000, there were 112,075 people, 42,973 households, and 30,682 families residing in the county. The population density was 210 people per square mile (81 people/km^{2}). There were 46,083 housing units at an average density of 86 units per square mile (33/km^{2}). The racial makeup of the county was 96.43% White, 2.20% Black or African American, 0.18% Native American, 0.23% Asian, 0.02% Pacific Islander, 0.15% from other races, and 0.79% from two or more races. 1.17% of the population were Hispanic or Latino of any race. 24.0% were of German, 12.9% English, 12.8% American, 12.3% Irish and 9.3% Italian ancestry according to Census 2000.

There were 42,973 households, out of which 31.70% had children under the age of 18 living with them, 57.10% were married couples living together, 10.30% had a female householder with no husband present, and 28.60% were non-families. 24.80% of all households were made up of individuals, and 11.90% had someone living alone who was 65 years of age or older. The average household size was 2.52 and the average family size was 3.00.

In the county, the population was spread out, with 24.30% under the age of 18, 7.80% from 18 to 24, 28.60% from 25 to 44, 24.20% from 45 to 64, and 15.00% who were 65 years of age or older. The median age was 38 years. For every 100 females there were 98.80 males. For every 100 females age 18 and over, there were 96.60 males.

The median income for a household in the county was $34,226, and the median income for a family was $40,486. Males had a median income of $32,134 versus $20,331 for females. The per capita income for the county was $16,655. About 9.00% of families and 11.50% of the population were below the poverty line, including 16.20% of those under age 18 and 8.40% of those age 65 or over.

== Government and politics ==
Ohio law defines a structure for county government. Columbiana County has three-member board of county commissioners, a sheriff, coroner, auditor, treasurer, clerk of the court of common pleas prosecutor, engineer, and recorder. Columbiana County is represented as part of Ohio's 79th state house district and Ohio's 33rd senatorial district. It is also included in the Ohio Seventh District Court of Appeals. Federally, it is part of Ohio's 6th congressional district.

Unlike most counties in Northeast Ohio, Columbiana County has predominantly favored the Republican Party throughout most of its history. In only eight elections since 1856 has a Democratic Party candidate won the county, the most recent being Bill Clinton in 1996. It was a swing county in the latter half of the 20th century, voting for the national winner in all but two elections from 1952 to 2004. However, since 2000 it has trended heavily Republican. This trend was most apparent in 2016 when Donald Trump posted the best showing by a Republican in the county since Herbert Hoover in 1928, with a 41-point margin of victory over Hillary Clinton.

United States presidential election results for Columbiana County, Ohio
Year	Republican		Democratic		Third party(ies)	
Year	No.	%	No.	%	No.	%
1856	3,516	57.55%	2,497	40.87%	96	1.57%
1860	3,864	60.37%	2,130	33.28%	407	6.36%
1864	4,553	64.54%	2,501	35.46%	0	0.00%
1868	4,881	62.42%	2,938	37.58%	0	0.00%
1872	4,773	61.78%	2,897	37.50%	56	0.72%
1876	5,417	55.87%	4,000	41.25%	279	2.88%
1880	6,545	58.45%	4,273	38.16%	379	3.38%
1884	6,995	57.85%	4,472	36.99%	624	5.16%
1888	7,700	57.08%	5,154	38.21%	636	4.71%
1892	7,232	51.97%	5,573	40.05%	1,111	7.98%
1896	9,487	57.80%	6,598	40.20%	329	2.00%
1900	10,255	60.53%	5,997	35.40%	690	4.07%
1904	11,571	67.22%	4,203	24.42%	1,439	8.36%
1908	9,626	53.26%	6,736	37.27%	1,710	9.46%
1912	4,601	28.59%	4,816	29.93%	6,674	41.48%
1916	8,118	46.85%	7,788	44.95%	1,420	8.20%
1920	16,846	60.11%	9,774	34.88%	1,403	5.01%
1924	20,483	69.97%	4,685	16.01%	4,104	14.02%
1928	26,405	77.30%	7,461	21.84%	292	0.85%
1932	19,707	55.62%	14,284	40.32%	1,439	4.06%
1936	16,986	42.26%	22,664	56.38%	548	1.36%
1940	21,221	48.71%	22,349	51.29%	0	0.00%
1944	19,976	51.52%	18,796	48.48%	0	0.00%
1948	17,724	51.32%	16,588	48.03%	226	0.65%
1952	26,707	58.36%	19,057	41.64%	0	0.00%
1956	28,783	66.47%	14,516	33.53%	0	0.00%
1960	28,414	58.64%	20,037	41.36%	0	0.00%
1964	15,827	35.54%	28,706	64.46%	0	0.00%
1968	19,947	46.21%	19,382	44.90%	3,841	8.90%
1972	27,308	62.63%	15,683	35.97%	611	1.40%
1976	22,318	48.13%	23,096	49.81%	953	2.06%
1980	20,798	50.55%	17,459	42.43%	2,886	7.01%
1984	24,552	54.43%	20,155	44.68%	403	0.89%
1988	21,175	49.08%	21,581	50.03%	384	0.89%
1992	15,016	31.58%	19,765	41.56%	12,773	26.86%
1996	15,386	35.27%	20,716	47.48%	7,527	17.25%
2000	21,804	49.08%	20,657	46.50%	1,966	4.43%
2004	25,753	52.06%	23,429	47.36%	283	0.57%
2008	25,585	52.54%	21,882	44.93%	1,232	2.53%
2012	25,251	54.66%	19,821	42.90%	1,127	2.44%
2016	31,676	68.13%	12,432	26.74%	2,384	5.13%
2020	35,726	71.51%	13,359	26.74%	875	1.75%
2024	35,607	73.80%	12,064	25.01%	575	1.19%

United States Senate election results for Columbiana County, Ohio1
Year	Republican		Democratic		Third party(ies)	
Year	No.	%	No.	%	No.	%
2024	31,757	66.72%	13,902	29.21%	1,935	4.07%

== Education ==
=== Colleges and universities ===
- Allegheny Wesleyan College
- Kent State University at East Liverpool
- Kent State University at Salem

=== Community, junior, and technical colleges ===
- Columbiana County Career and Technical Center
- East Ohio College
- New Castle School of Trades

=== Public school districts ===
School districts with portions of the county, no matter how slight, include:

- Alliance City School District
- Beaver Local School District
- Columbiana Exempted Village School District
- Crestview Local School District
- East Liverpool City School District
- East Palestine City School District
- Leetonia Exempted Village School District
- Lisbon Exempted Village School District
- Minerva Local School District
- Salem City School District
- Southern Local School District
- United Local School District
- Wellsville Local School District
- West Branch Local School District

==== High schools ====
- Beaver Local High School
- Columbiana High School
- Crestview High School
- David Anderson Junior/Senior High School
- East Liverpool Junior/Senior High School
- East Palestine High School
- Leetonia High School
- Salem High School
- Southern Local Junior/Senior High School
- United High School
- Wellsville Junior/Senior High School

=== Private schools ===
- Heartland Christian School – Columbiana
- East Liverpool Christian School – Glenmoor
- St. Paul Elementary School – Salem

== Transportation ==
=== Airports ===
The Columbiana County Airport is located four nautical miles (4.6 mi; 7.4 km) northwest of East Liverpool's central business district.

=== Major highways ===
- US 30
- US 62
- SR 7
- SR 9
- SR 11
- SR 14
- SR 39
- SR 45
- SR 46
- SR 154
- SR 164
- SR 170
- SR 172
- SR 173
- SR 267
- SR 344
- SR 517
- SR 518
- SR 558
- SR 644

== Communities ==
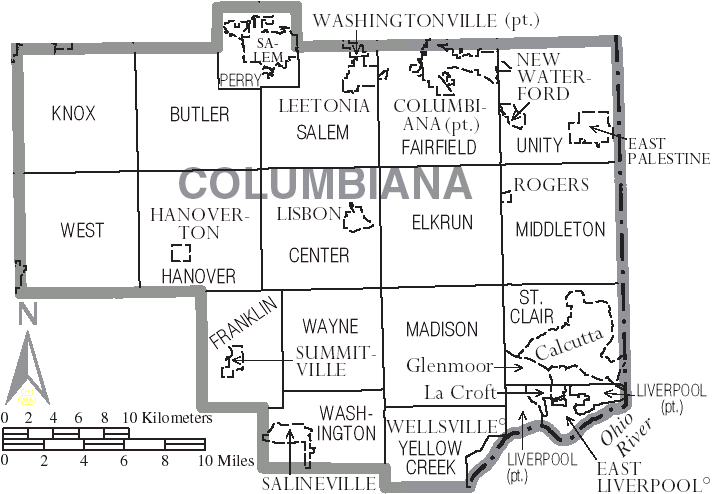
Map of Columbiana County, Ohio with Municipal and Township Labels

=== Cities ===
- Columbiana
- East Liverpool
- Salem

=== Villages ===
- East Palestine
- Hanoverton
- Leetonia
- Lisbon (county seat)
- Minerva
- New Waterford
- Rogers
- Salineville
- Summitville
- Washingtonville
- Wellsville

=== Townships ===
- Butler
- Center
- Elkrun
- Fairfield
- Franklin
- Hanover
- Knox
- Liverpool
- Madison
- Middleton
- Perry
- Salem
- St. Clair
- Unity
- Washington
- Wayne
- West
- Yellow Creek

=== Census-designated places ===
- Calcutta
- Damascus
- East Rochester
- Glenmoor
- Homeworth
- La Croft
- Lake Tomahawk
- Negley
- Salem Heights

=== Unincorporated communities ===
- Achor
- Bayard
- Cannons Mill
- Chambersburg
- Clarkson
- Dungannon
- East Carmel
- East Fairfield
- Elkton
- Franklin Square
- Fredericktown
- Gavers
- Glasgow
- Guilford
- Highlandtown
- Kensington
- Lynchburg
- Middleton
- Mill Rock
- Millport
- Moultrie
- New Alexander
- New Garden
- New Middleton
- New Salisbury
- North Georgetown
- Reading
- Signal
- Teegarden
- Unionville
- Unity
- Valley
- West Point
- Williamsport
- Winona

=== Population ranking ===
The population ranking of the following table is based on the 2020 census of Columbiana County.

* majority of municipality in Columbiana County
** minority of municipality in Columbiana County
† county seat

Rank	City/Town/etc.	Population (2020 Census)	Township	Municipal type
1	Salem*	11,915	Perry, Salem	City
2	East Liverpool	9,958	Liverpool	City
3	Columbiana*	6,559	Fairfield, Unity	City
4	East Palestine	4,761	Unity	Village
5	Calcutta	3,941	St. Clair	CDP
6	Minerva**	3,684	West	Village
7	Wellsville	3,113	Yellow Creek	Village
8	† Lisbon	2,597	Center, Elkrun	Village
9	Leetonia	1,833	Salem, Fairfield	Village
10	Glenmoor	1,829	St. Clair	CDP
11	Salineville	1,206	Washington	Village
12	New Waterford	1,194	Unity	Village
13	La Croft	1,078	Liverpool	CDP
14	Washingtonville*	712	Salem	Village
15	Lake Tomahawk	494	Middleton	CDP
16	Homeworth	492	Knox	CDP
17	Damascus**	418	Butler	CDP
18	Hanoverton	354	Hanover	Village
19	Negley	274	Middleton	CDP
20	East Rochester	224	West	CDP
21	Rogers	194	Middleton	Village
22	Summitville	110	Franklin	Village

== Notable residents ==
- Harvey Firestone, businessman and founder of the Firestone Tire and Rubber Company
- William M. Fogo, Wisconsin legislator and newspaper editor
- Mark Hanna, U.S. senator from Ohio; grew up in Lisbon
- Ammon Hennacy, Christian anarchist; grew up in Negley
- Lou Holtz, former college football coach; grew up in East Liverpool
- Robert Justice, early Ohio statesman
- Rich Karlis, former NFL placekicker for the Denver Broncos, Minnesota Vikings and Detroit Lions, from Salem, Ohio
- William McKinley, 25th president of the United States; grew up in Lisbon
- William Ralston, who founded the Bank of California and became for a time the richest man in California; born in Columbiana County
- Clement Vallandigham, Copperhead leader; born and lived for several years in Lisbon
- Derek Wolfe, former NFL defensive end for the Denver Broncos and Baltimore Ravens; grew up in Negley

== See also ==
- National Register of Historic Places listings in Columbiana County, Ohio
