= Ohio State Route 644 =

State highway in northeastern Ohio, US

State Route 644

Route information
- Maintained by ODOT
- Length: 11.60 mi (18.67 km)
- Existed: 1937–present

Major junctions
- South end: SR 39 in Salineville
- North end: US 30 / SR 9 in Kensington

Location
- Country: United States
- State: Ohio
- Counties: Columbiana, Carroll

Highway system
- Ohio State Highway System; Interstate; US; State; Scenic
← SR 643	→ SR 646

State Route 644 (SR 644) is a north–south state highway running through Columbiana and Carroll counties in northeast Ohio. Its southern terminus is at SR 39 in downtown Salineville, and its northern terminus is at its junction with U.S. Route 30(US 30) and SR 9 in the center of Kensington. The route connects mainly rural and a few unincorporated parts of southeastern Columbiana County. SR 644 only briefly passes into a corner of Carroll County for a 0.41-mile (0.66 km) journey.

== Route description ==
The starting point of SR 644 is its junction with SR 39 in the Columbiana County village of Salineville, at the intersection of Main Street and Lincoln Street. SR 644 follows Main Street west from this intersection, and turns northerly after two blocks, as the road becomes known as Hanover Road. The route bends northwesterly, then passes by Woodlawn Cemetery, turns northerly again, and back to the northwest, as it heads out of the village limits of Salineville through a wooded setting. Entering into Washington Township, SR 644 intersects Walnut Ridge Road, turns west-northwesterly, then curves north-northwesterly, as it ducks just barely into Carroll County, and correspondingly, Fox Township. SR 644 has no intersections in the 0.41-mile (0.66 km) it covers in Carroll County, just passing by a blend of woods and fields. SR 644 re-enters Columbiana County, this time into Franklin Township. Trending northwesterly, SR 644 meets Dobson Road, then curves to the west-northwest. The rural setting the highway traverses is a blend of woods and fields, with a few homes dotting the landscape. SR 644 bends northwesterly, then follows a reverse curve northerly before resuming a northwesterly path. Next, it passes by intersections with Hull Road and Lewis Road, where the highway turns to the north. Further along, SR 644 bends to the northeast, then starts to curve to the northwest as it enters into Summitville. Once within the village, SR 644 follows Main Street, and has an intersection with Yellow Creek Church Road. The route turns north into the main portion of the village, then turns northeasterly to pass underneath the Norfolk Southern Railway. Resuming a northerly course, SR 644 passes by intersections with Fink Road and Summitville Road before departing Summitville, and re-entering Franklin Township. The route bends northeast, then north again, as it passes by the hamlet of Millport, where it meets SR 518 at its western terminus.

Continuing north of SR 518, SR 644 curves to the northwest, passes by a split intersection with Willard Road, then meets Bethesda Road. Next, the route bends to the west briefly, then resumes a northwesterly trek, and comes upon a split intersection with McKaig Road. SR 644 then passes just to the east of the northeasternmost point in Carroll County, while remaining in Columbiana County, crossing from Franklin Township into Hanover Township. SR 644 bends north, turns northwesterly, then begins to trend to the west as it approaches Mechanicstown Road. Beyond there, SR 644 turns to the west-northwest, closely paralleling the Norfolk Southern railway that exists to the south of the highway, as SR 644 enters the unincorporated community of Kensington. Passing by a number of homes, SR 644 comes to an end as it arrives at its junction with US 30 and SR 9.

== History ==
In 1937, SR 644 was designated along the route that it currently occupies, and has not experienced any major changes in its routing since its inception.

== Major intersections ==
County	Location	mi	km	Destinations	Notes
Columbiana	Salineville	0.00	0.00	SR 39 (West Main Street / Lincoln Street) – Wellsville, Carrollton	
Carroll	No major junctions				
Columbiana	Franklin Township	6.69	10.77	SR 518 east – West Point	Western terminus of SR 518
Columbiana	Hanover Township	11.60	18.67	US 30 (Lincoln Highway) / SR 9 – Salem, Minerva, Carrollton	
1.000 mi = 1.609 km; 1.000 km = 0.621 mi
