= Unionville, Columbiana County, Ohio =

Unionville, Ohio
- Unincorporated community
- Location within Ohio Location within the United States
- Coordinates: 40°51′19″N 80°44′14″W
- Country: United States
- State: Ohio
- County: Columbiana
- Township: Fairfield
- Elevation: 1,175 ft (358 m)
- Time zone: UTC-5 (Eastern (EST))
  - Summer (DST): UTC-4 (EDT)
- Area codes: 234 & 330
- GNIS feature ID: 1065409

Unionville is an unincorporated community in Columbiana County, Ohio, United States. Unionville is located on Ohio State Route 164, 3.2 miles (5.1 km) southwest of Columbiana.

Unionville was originally called Cool Springs, on account of there being a spring near the original town site.
