= Valley, Ohio =

- Unincorporated community
- Location within Ohio Location within the United States
- Country: United States
- State: Ohio
- County: Columbiana
- Township: Butler
- Elevation: 1,152 ft (351 m)
- Time zone: UTC-5 (Eastern (EST))
  - Summer (DST): UTC-4 (EDT)
- ZIP code: 44609
- Area codes: 330, 234
- GNIS feature ID: 1063075

Valley is an unincorporated community in Butler Township, Columbiana County, Ohio, United States. It lies about 2.5 miles (4.0 km) south of Damascus and 6 miles (9.7 km) southwest of Salem.

== History ==
Valley was platted in 1810. The community was named for the creek valley in which the town site is situated. A post office called Valley was established in 1868, and remained in operation until 1901.
