= Lynchburg, Columbiana County, Ohio =

Unincorporated community in Ohio, U.S.

Coordinates: 40°44′28″N 80°59′57″W

Lynchburg is an unincorporated community in Columbiana County, in the U.S. state of Ohio.

== History ==
Lynchburg was platted in 1834 when the Sandy and Beaver Canal was extended to that point. The community was named after Lynchburg, Virginia. A former variant name of Lynchburg was Green Hill. A post office called Green Hill was established in 1828, the name was changed to Greenhill in 1893, and the post office closed in 1902.
