= Unity Township, Columbiana County, Ohio =

Township in Ohio, US

- Township
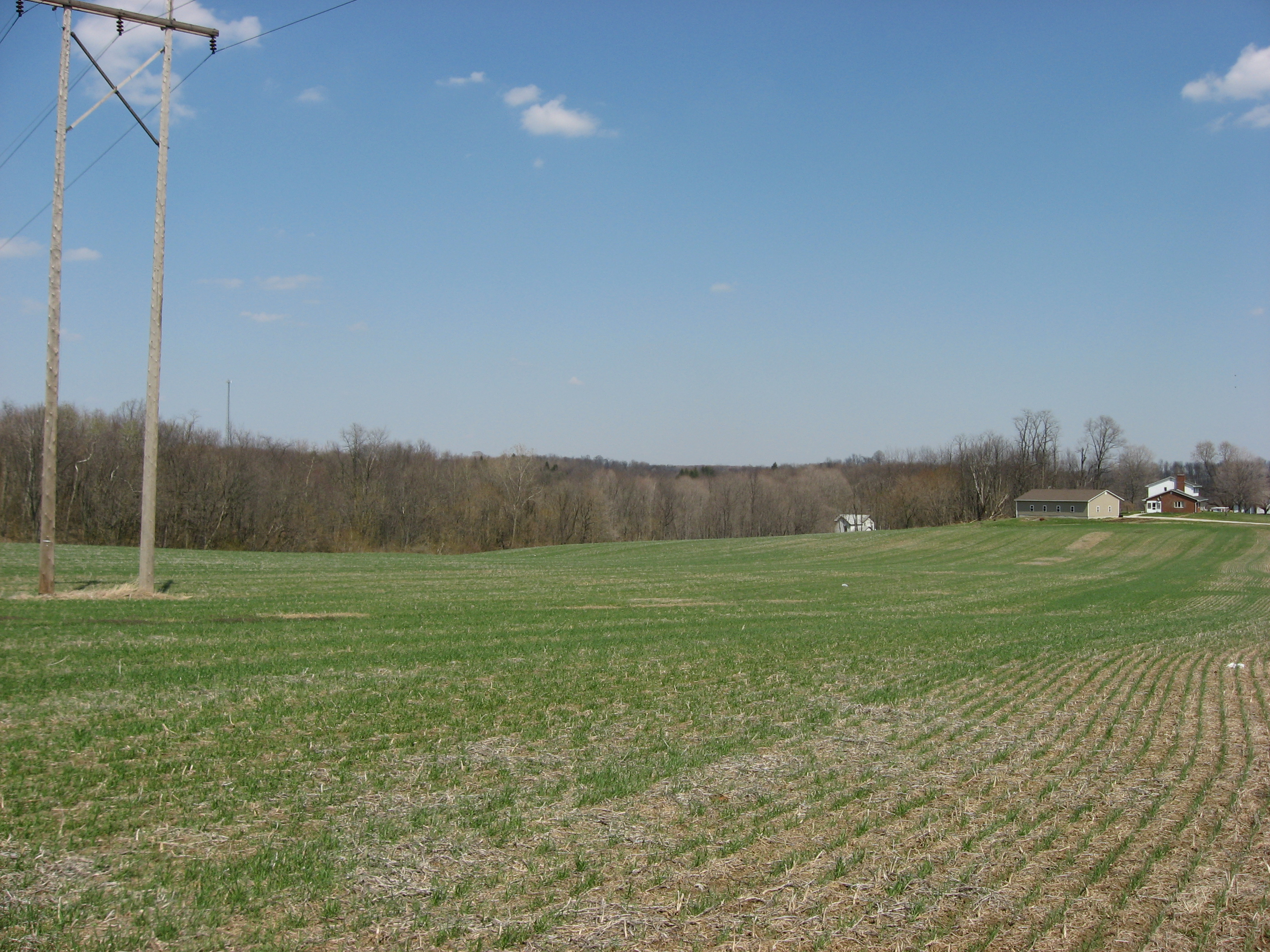
- Fields in Unity Township

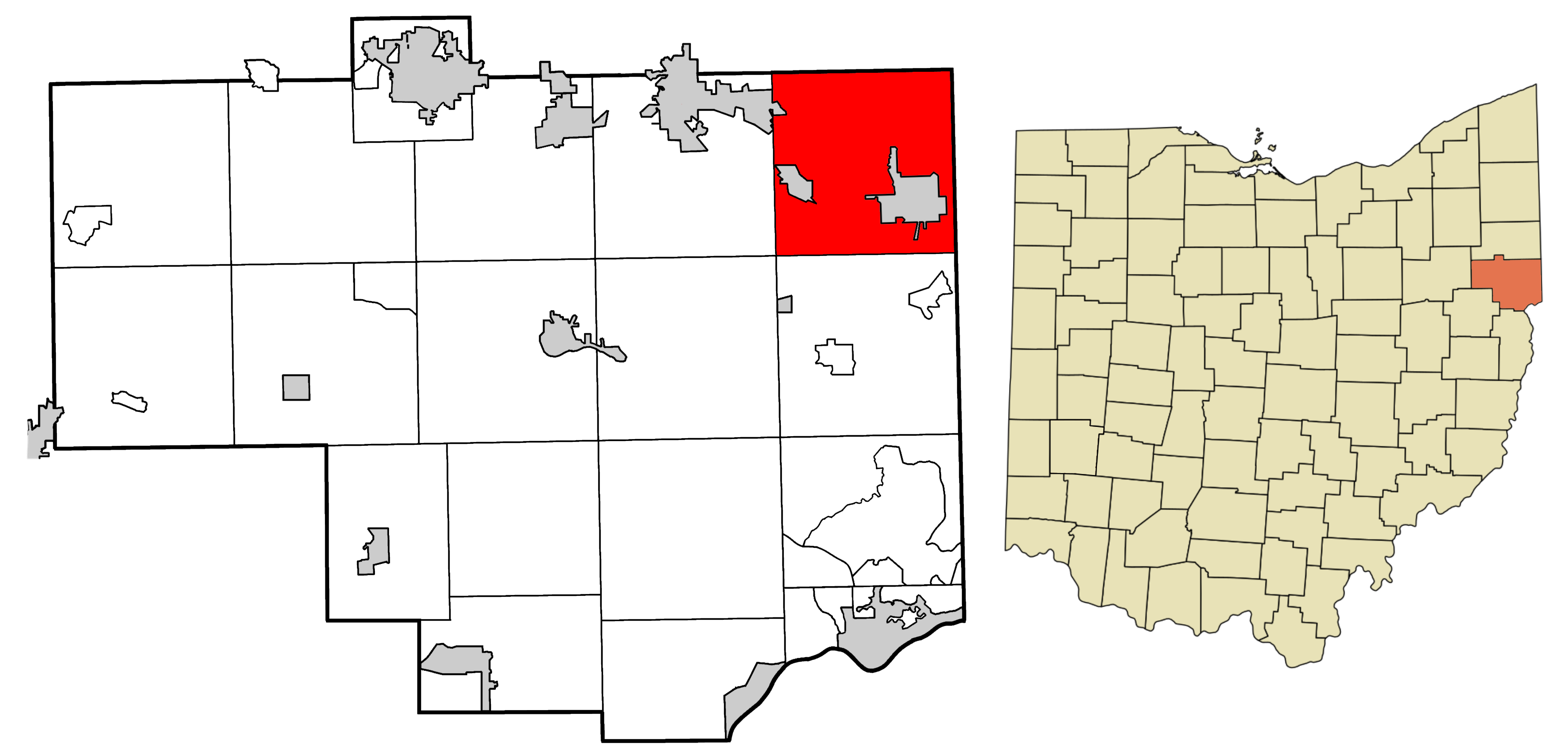
- Location of Unity Township in Columbiana County
- Coordinates: 40°50′34″N 80°33′45″W
- Country: United States
- State: Ohio
- County: Columbiana

Area
  - Total: 35.5 sq mi (91.9 km^{2})
  - Land: 35.3 sq mi (91.4 km^{2})
  - Water: 0.15 sq mi (0.4 km^{2})
- Elevation: 1,109 ft (338 m)

Population (2020)
  - Total: 9,721
  - Density: 275/sq mi (106/km^{2})
- Time zone: UTC-5 (Eastern (EST))
  - Summer (DST): UTC-4 (EDT)
- FIPS code: 39-78890
- GNIS feature ID: 1085903

Unity Township is one of the eighteen townships of Columbiana County, Ohio, United States. The 2020 census reported 9,721 people living in the township.

== Geography ==
Located in the northeastern corner of the county, it borders the following townships:

- Springfield Township, Mahoning County - north
- North Beaver Township, Pennsylvania - northeast corner
- Little Beaver Township, Lawrence County, Pennsylvania - east
- Darlington Township, Beaver County, Pennsylvania - southeast
- Middleton Township - south
- Elkrun Township - southwest corner
- Fairfield Township - west
- Beaver Township, Mahoning County - northwest corner

One city and two villages are located in Unity Township:

- The eastern tip of the city of Columbiana, in the northwest
- The village of East Palestine, in the southeast
- The village of New Waterford, in the west

== Name and history ==
Historical population
Census	Pop.	Note	%±
1980	10,220		—
1990	10,129		−0.9%
2000	10,294		1.6%
2010	9,957		−3.3%
2020	9,721		−2.4%

It is the only Unity Township statewide.

The township was organized in 1806 and named by George Augustine.

== Government ==
The township is governed by a three-member board of trustees, who are elected in November of odd-numbered years to a four-year term beginning on the following January 1. Two are elected in the year after the presidential election and one is elected in the year before it. There is also an elected township fiscal officer, who serves a four-year term beginning on April 1 of the year after the election, which is held in November of the year before the presidential election. Vacancies in the fiscal officership or on the board of trustees are filled by the remaining trustees.

=== Township Trustees ===
- Kathy McCarthy, Chairwoman
- Bryan R. Henderson, Vice Chairman
- Terry L. McElroy

=== Fiscal Officer ===
- Nancy G. Herr
