= New Alexander, Ohio =

Unincorporated community in Ohio, U.S.

Coordinates: 40°47′19″N 80°59′38″W

New Alexander is an unincorporated community in Columbiana County, in the U.S. state of Ohio.

== History ==
New Alexander was laid out about 1812. A post office called New Alexander was established in 1829, and remained in operation until 1904.
