= Reading, Columbiana County, Ohio =

Unincorporated community in Ohio, U.S.

Coordinates: 40°50′06″N 81°01′52″W

Reading is an unincorporated community in Columbiana County, in the U.S. state of Ohio.

Reading was platted around 1840.
