= Cannons Mill, Ohio =

Community in Columbiana County, Ohio, U.S.

Coordinates: 40°40′56″N 80°36′39″W

Cannons Mill is an unincorporated community in Columbiana County, in the U.S. state of Ohio.

== History ==
A post office called Cannons Mill was established in 1842, and remained in operation until 1902. Besides the post office, the community had its namesake Cannon's Mills, a gristmill.
