= Hiram Bell Farmstead =

Historic house in Ohio, United States

- Bell, Hiram, Farmstead
- U.S. National Register of Historic Places
- U.S. Historic district
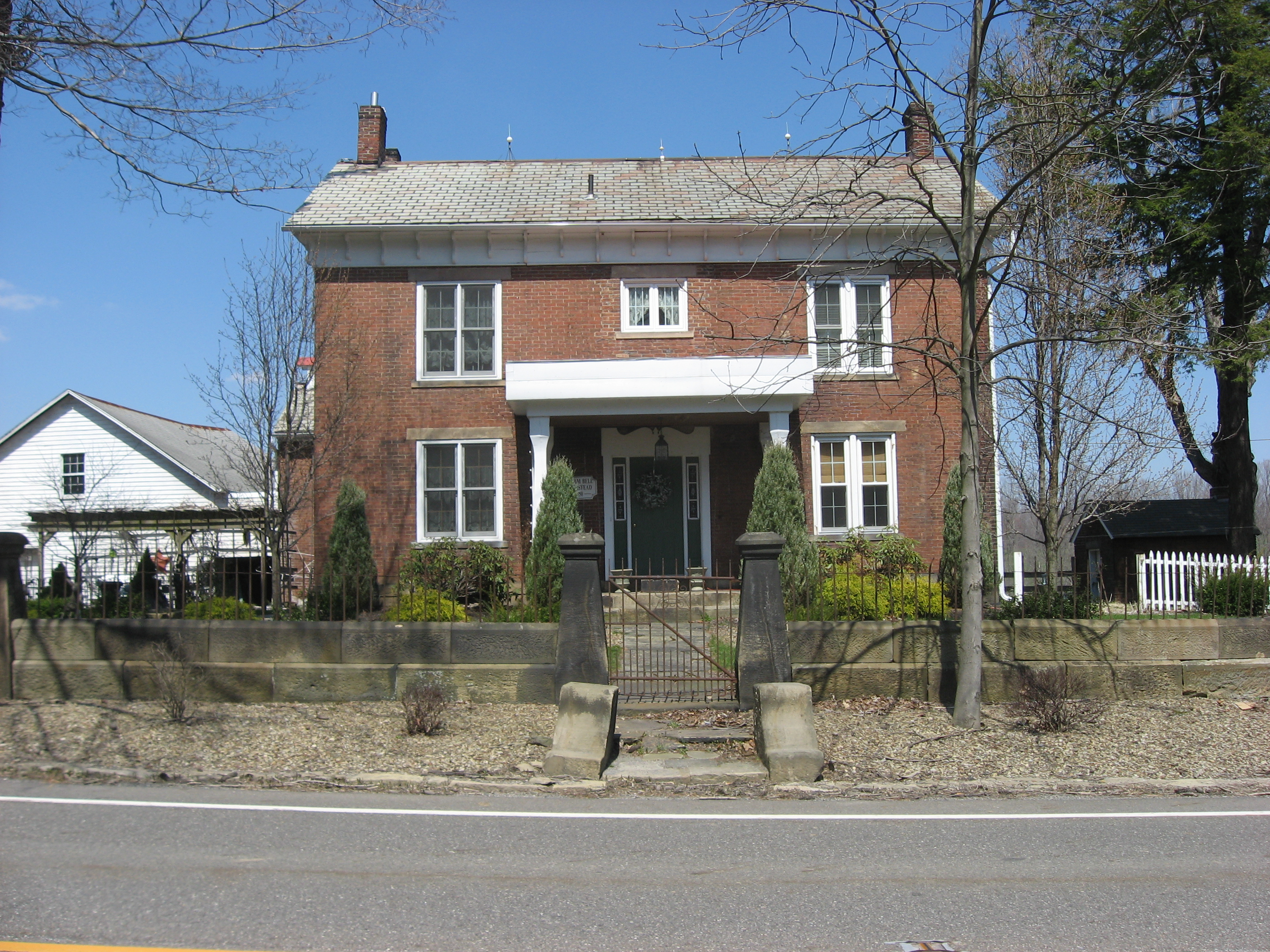
- Hiram Bell Farmstead
- Location: 43628 OH 517, Columbiana, Ohio; Fairfield Township, Columbiana County, Ohio
- Nearest city: Columbiana, Ohio
- Coordinates: 40°48′59″N 80°40′32″W
- Area: 123.9 acres (50.1 ha)
- Built: 1850
- Architect: Hiram Bell
- Architectural style: Greek Revival, Italianate
- NRHP reference No.: 99001496
- Added to NRHP: December 9, 1999

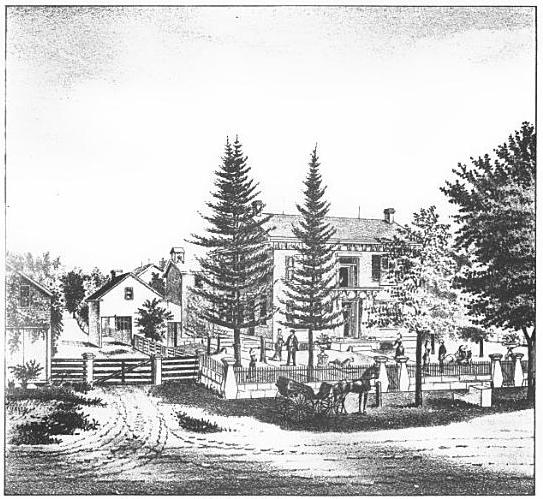
Drawing of the farmstead as it appeared in the late 19th century

The Hiram Bell Farmstead was built by Hiram Bell in 1850. It is located in Fairfield Township, Columbiana County, Ohio. The house and adjoining buildings were added to the National Register of Historic Places as a historic district in 1999.

Bell was a native of Columbiana County, born at the family homestead approximately 2.5 miles (4.0 km) southwest of East Fairfield in Elkrun Township. In 1877, Bell was elected to a three-year term as a Columbiana County commissioner. By this time, he had built himself a reputation as a prosperous businessman. Beside his farm, Bell supported his family via a simple industrial facility: throughout the 1860s and 1870s, he owned a steam sawmill in Elkrun Township.
