= Salem Township, Columbiana County, Ohio =

Township in Ohio, US

- Township
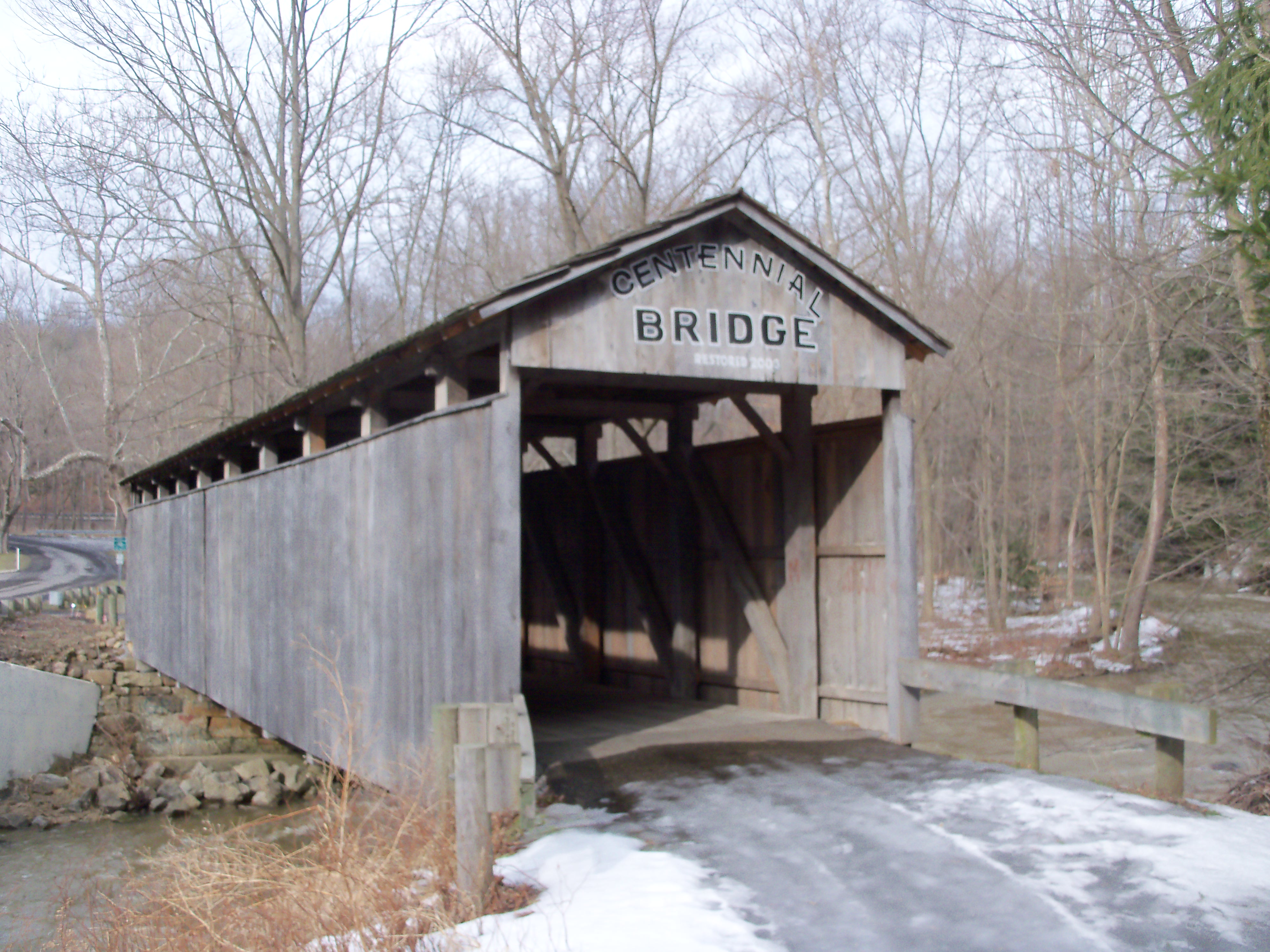
- Teegarden-Centennial Covered Bridge

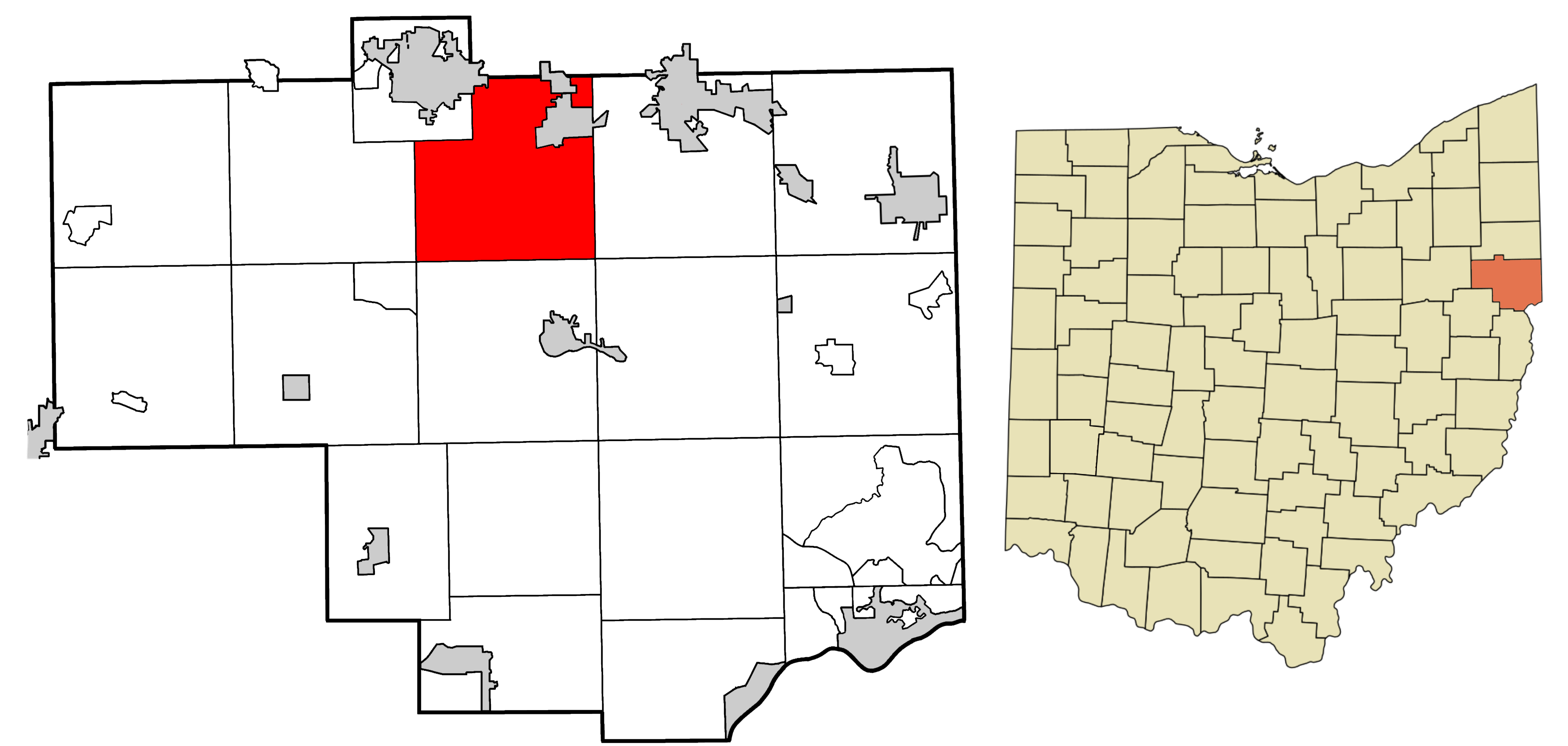
- Location of Salem Township in Columbiana County
- Coordinates: 40°52′28″N 80°46′41″W
- Country: United States
- State: Ohio
- County: Columbiana

Area
  - Total: 31.2 sq mi (80.9 km^{2})
  - Land: 31.2 sq mi (80.7 km^{2})
  - Water: 0.077 sq mi (0.2 km^{2})
- Elevation: 1,001 ft (305 m)

Population (2020)
  - Total: 5,142
  - Density: 165/sq mi (63.7/km^{2})
- Time zone: UTC-5 (Eastern (EST))
  - Summer (DST): UTC-4 (EDT)
- ZIP code: 44460
- Area codes: 330, 234
- FIPS code: 39-69848
- GNIS feature ID: 1085902

Salem Township is one of the eighteen townships of Columbiana County, Ohio, United States. The 2020 census reported 5,142 people living in the township.

== Geography ==
Located in the northern part of the county, it borders the following townships:

- Green Township, Mahoning County - north
- Beaver Township, Mahoning County - northeast corner
- Fairfield Township - east
- Elkrun Township - southeast corner
- Center Township - south
- Hanover Township - southwest corner
- Butler Township - west
- Perry Township - northwest

One city and two villages are located in Salem Township:

- The eastern tip of the city of Salem, in the northwest
- The village of Leetonia, in the northeast
- The village of Washingtonville, in the north

== Name and history ==
Historical population
Census	Pop.	Note	%±
1980	5,365		—
1990	5,523		2.9%
2000	5,703		3.3%
2010	5,484		−3.8%
2020	5,142		−6.2%

It is one of fourteen Salem Townships statewide.

The township was among the first organized in the county in 1803.

== Government ==
The township is governed by a three-member board of trustees, who are elected in November of odd-numbered years to a four-year term beginning on the following January 1. Two are elected in the year after the presidential election and one is elected in the year before it. There is also an elected township fiscal officer, who serves a four-year term beginning on April 1 of the year after the election, which is held in November of the year before the presidential election. Vacancies in the fiscal officership or on the board of trustees are filled by the remaining trustees.

=== Township Trustees ===
- William Heston, Chairman
- John Wilms, Vice Chairman
- Ray Heddleson

=== Fiscal Officer ===
- Dale L. Davis
