= Signal, Ohio =

- Unincorporated community
- Location within Ohio Location within the United States
- Coordinates: 40°47′54″N 80°39′33″W
- Country: United States
- State: Ohio
- County: Columbiana
- Township: Elkrun
- Elevation: 1,109 ft (338 m)
- Time zone: UTC-5 (Eastern (EST))
  - Summer (DST): UTC-4 (EDT)
- ZIP code: 44432
- Area codes: 330, 234
- GNIS feature ID: 1065322

Signal is an unincorporated community in Elkrun Township, Columbiana County, Ohio, United States. The Columbiana County Port Authority's Signal rail terminal is in the vicinity.

== History ==
A post office called Signal was established in 1890, and remained in operation until 1959. The origin of the name "Signal" is obscure.
