= Glasgow, Columbiana County, Ohio =

Unincorporated community in Ohio, U.S.

- Location within Ohio Location within the United States
- Coordinates: 40°39′28″N 80°41′23″W
- Country: United States
- State: Ohio
- County: Columbiana
- Elevation: 1,253 ft (382 m)
- GNIS feature ID: 1064726

Glasgow is an unincorporated community in Columbiana County, in the U.S. state of Ohio.

== History ==
Glasgow was platted in 1852. The community was named after Glasgow, Scotland, the ancestral land of a large share of the first settlers. A post office called Glasgow was established in 1839, and remained in operation until 1902.
