= Kensington, Ohio =

- Unincorporated community
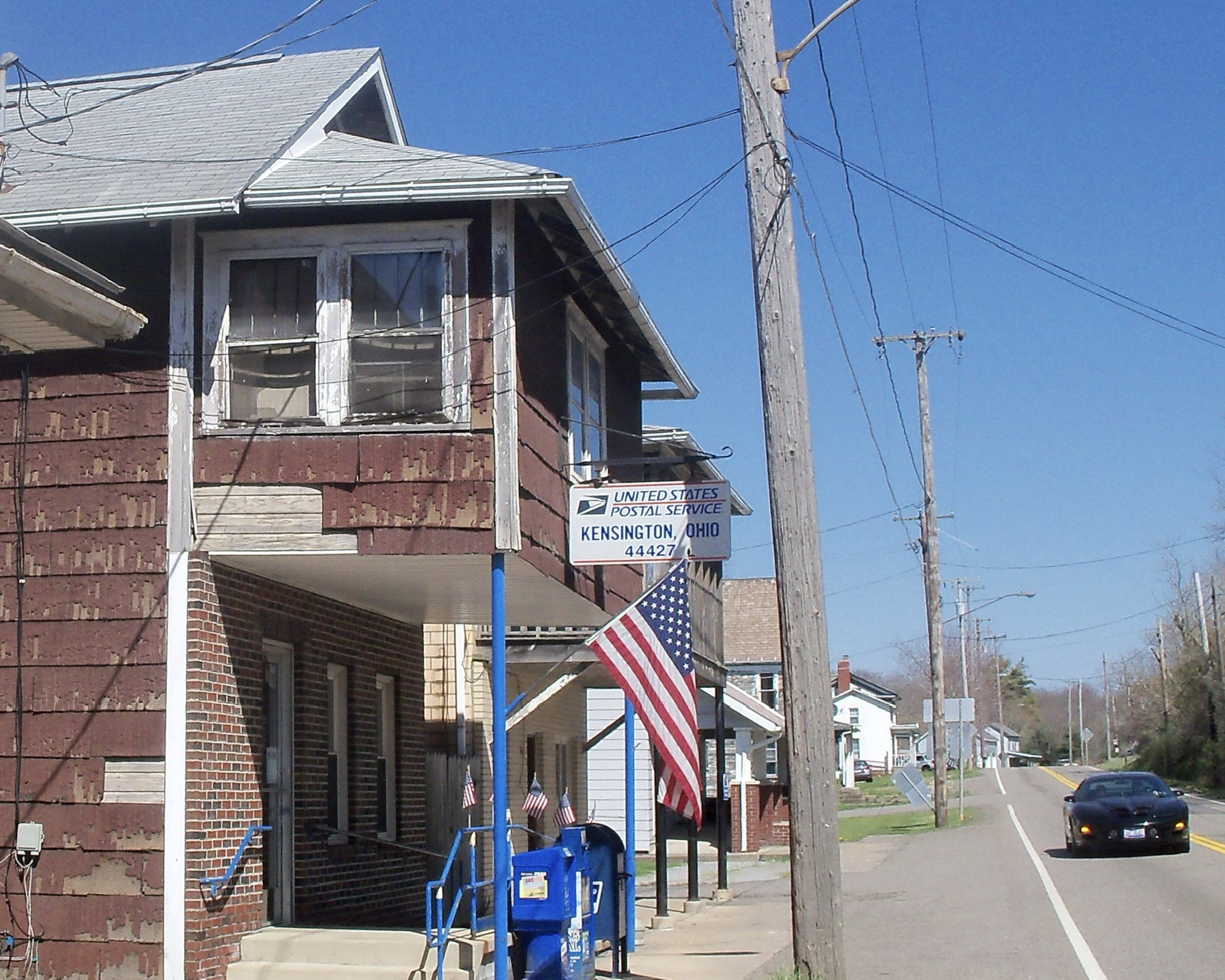
- Kensington Post Office

- Location within Ohio Location within the United States
- Coordinates: 40°44′07″N 80°57′23″W
- Country: United States
- State: Ohio
- County: Columbiana
- Township: Hanover
- Elevation: 1,116 ft (340 m)
- Time zone: UTC-5 (Eastern (EST))
  - Summer (DST): UTC-4 (EDT)
- ZIP code: 44427
- Area codes: 234/330
- GNIS feature ID: 1064926

Kensington is an unincorporated community in Hanover Township, Columbiana County, Ohio, United States. It is located along U.S. Route 30 at its intersection with Ohio State Route 9 and 644.

== History ==
Kensington was originally called Mayville, and under the latter name was laid out in 1852 when the Cleveland and Pittsburgh Railroad was extended to that point. A post office called Maysville was established in 1860, and the name was changed to Kensington in 1876. Besides the post office, Kensington had a train station, hotel, and country store.

Kensington is 23 miles (37 km) miles east of Canton and 30 miles (48 km) southwest of Youngstown.

== Parks and recreation ==
Kensington is home to the Seven Ranges Scout Reservation, a nearly 900 acres (360 ha) camping reservation owned by the Buckeye Council of the Boy Scouts of America. It is composed of three camps with numerous campsites and recreational activities, including a lake and field sports ranges.

== Education ==
Children in Kensington are served by the public United Local School District, which includes one elementary school, one middle school, and United High School. Parts of the outlying area served by the Kensington post office are included in the Carrollton Exempted Village School District and Southern Local School District.
