= Elkrun Township, Ohio =

Township in Ohio, US

Elkrun Township, Columbiana County, Ohio
- Township
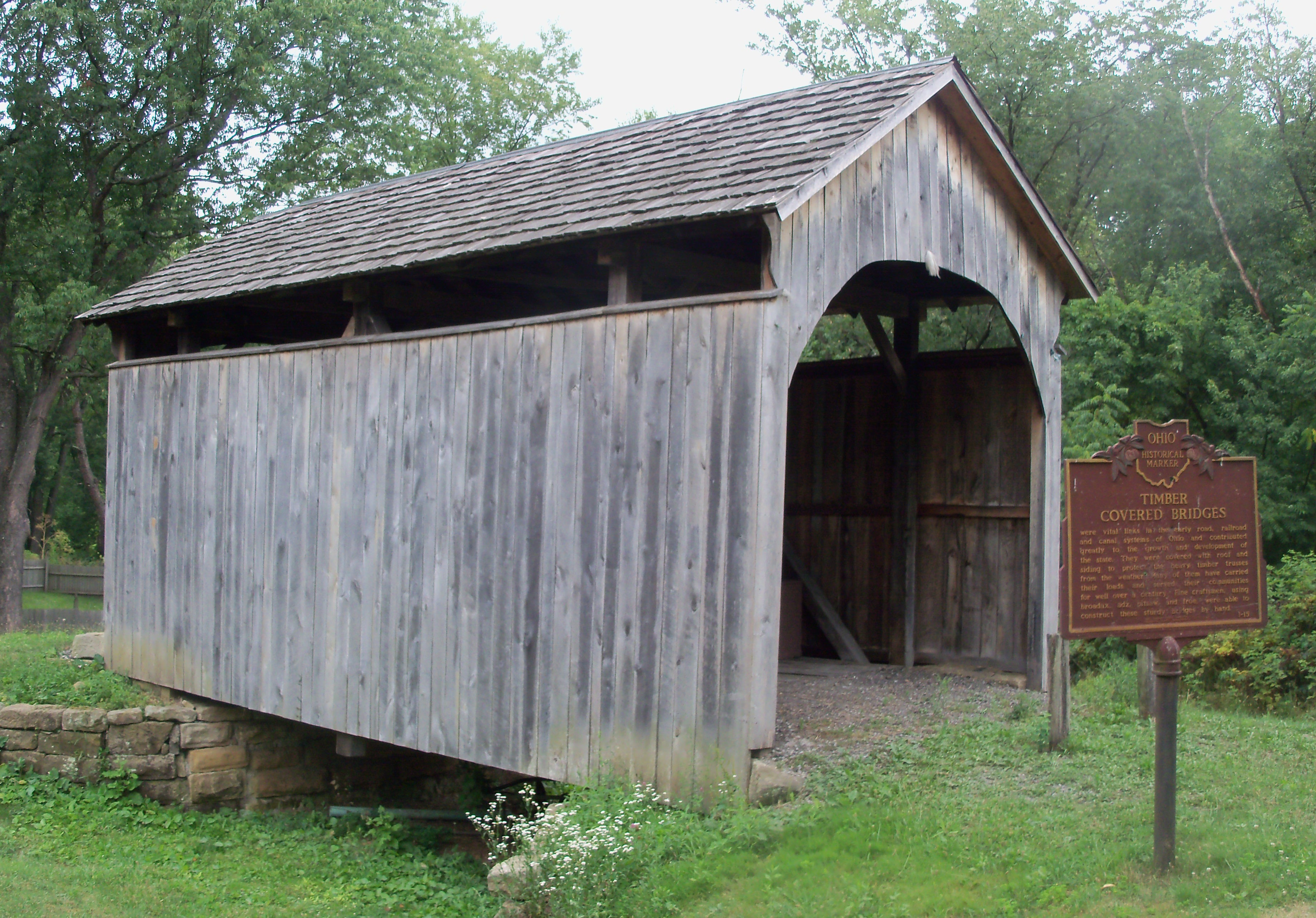
- Church Hill Road Covered Bridge

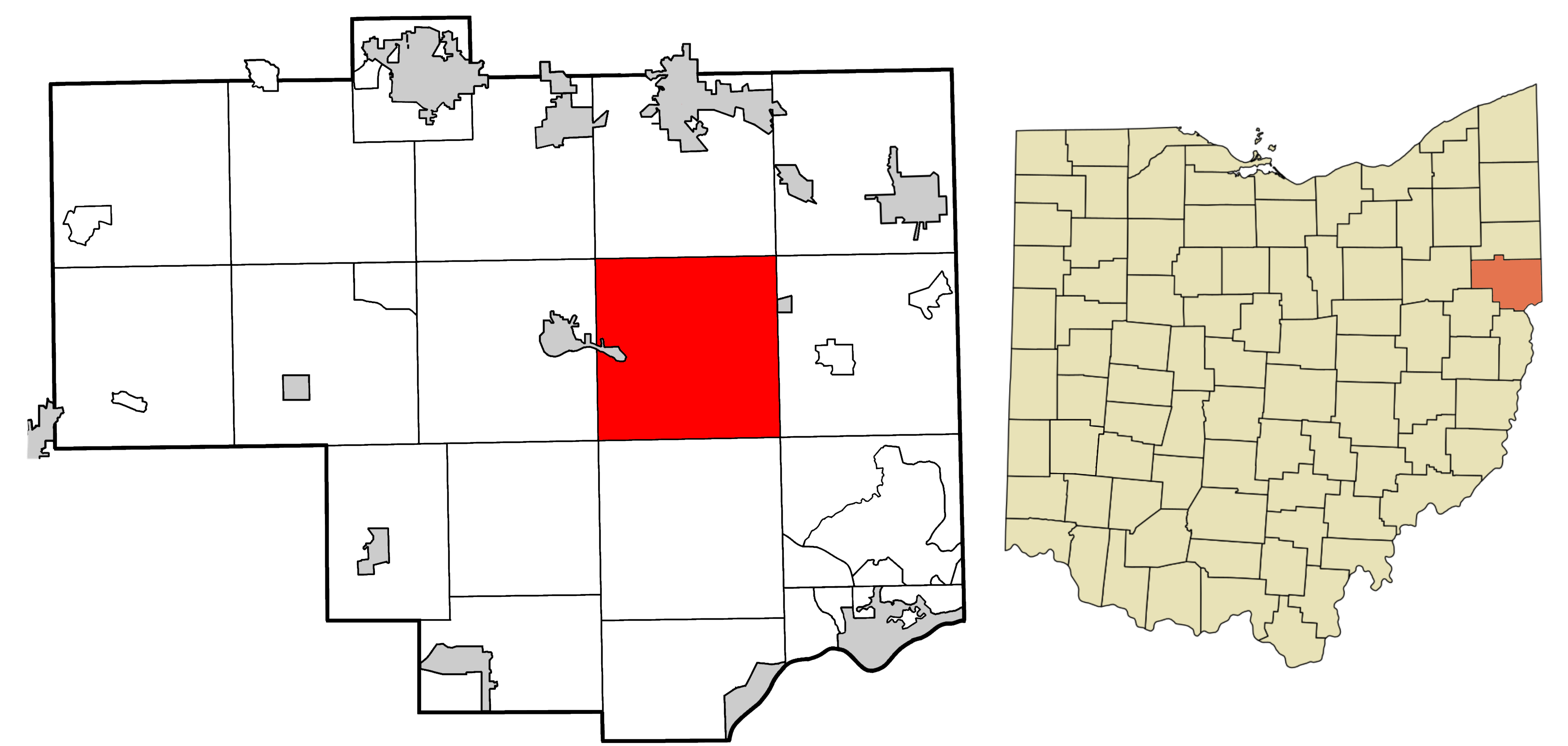
- Location of Elkrun Township in Columbiana County
- Coordinates: 40°46′49″N 80°41′6″W
- Country: United States
- State: Ohio
- County: Columbiana

Area
  - Total: 35.8 sq mi (92.8 km^{2})
  - Land: 35.8 sq mi (92.7 km^{2})
  - Water: 0.039 sq mi (0.1 km^{2})
- Elevation: 980 ft (300 m)

Population (2020)
  - Total: 4,367
  - Density: 122/sq mi (47.1/km^{2})
- Time zone: UTC-5 (Eastern (EST))
  - Summer (DST): UTC-4 (EDT)
- FIPS code: 39-24906
- GNIS feature ID: 1085892
- Website: https://www.elkruntownship.org/

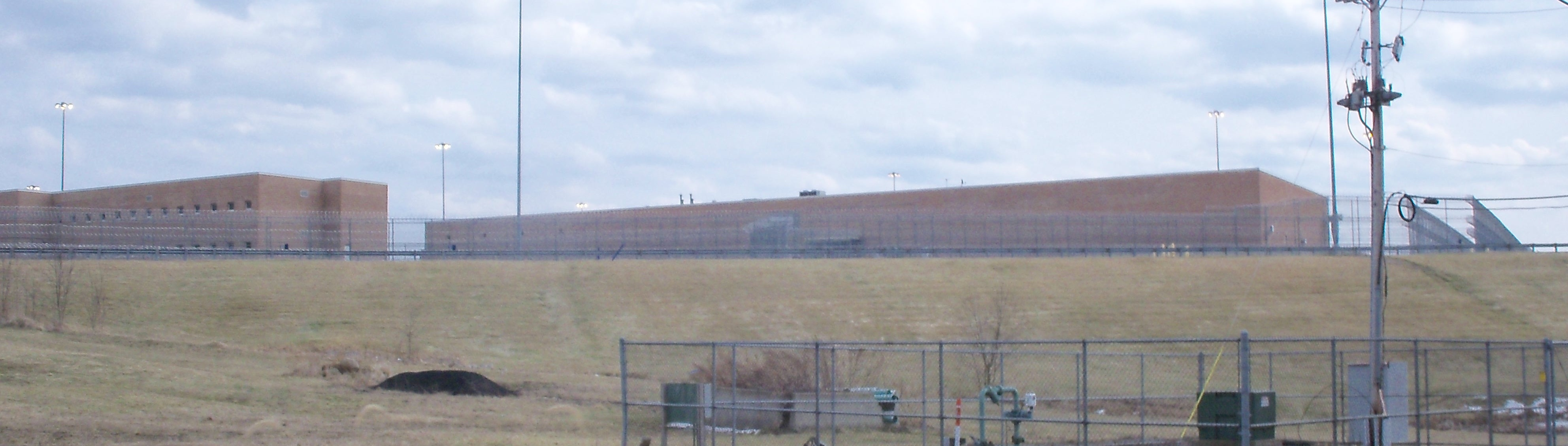
Elkton Federal Prison

Elkrun Township is one of the eighteen townships of Columbiana County, Ohio, United States. The 2020 census reported 4,367 people living in the township.

== Geography ==
Located in the eastern part of the county, it borders the following townships:

- Fairfield Township - north
- Unity Township - northeast corner
- Middleton Township - east
- St. Clair Township - southeast corner
- Madison Township - south
- Wayne Township - southwest corner
- Center Township - west
- Salem Township - northwest corner

One village and two unincorporated communities are located in Elkrun Township:

- The eastern tip of the village of Lisbon, in the west
- The unincorporated community of Elkton, in the center
- The unincorporated community of Signal, in the northeast

== Name and history ==
Historical population
Census	Pop.	Note	%±
1980	2,288		—
1990	2,186		−4.5%
2000	4,781		118.7%
2010	4,687		−2.0%
2020	4,367		−6.8%

It is the only Elkrun Township statewide, although there are Elk Townships in Noble and Vinton counties. The township was organized in 1806.

== Government ==
The township is governed by a three-member board of trustees, who are elected in November of odd-numbered years to a four-year term beginning on the following January 1. Two are elected in the year after the presidential election and one is elected in the year before it. There is also an elected township fiscal officer, who serves a four-year term beginning on April 1 of the year after the election, which is held in November of the year before the presidential election. Vacancies in the fiscal officership or on the board of trustees are filled by the remaining trustees.

=== Township Trustees ===
- Anthony G. Sweeney, Chairman
- Kurt Seachrist, Vice Chairman
- Randy Perrino

=== Fiscal Officer ===
- Tracey Wonner

=== Federal government ===
Federal Correctional Institution Elkton is in the township.
