= Columbiana County Infirmary =

- U.S. National Register of Historic Places
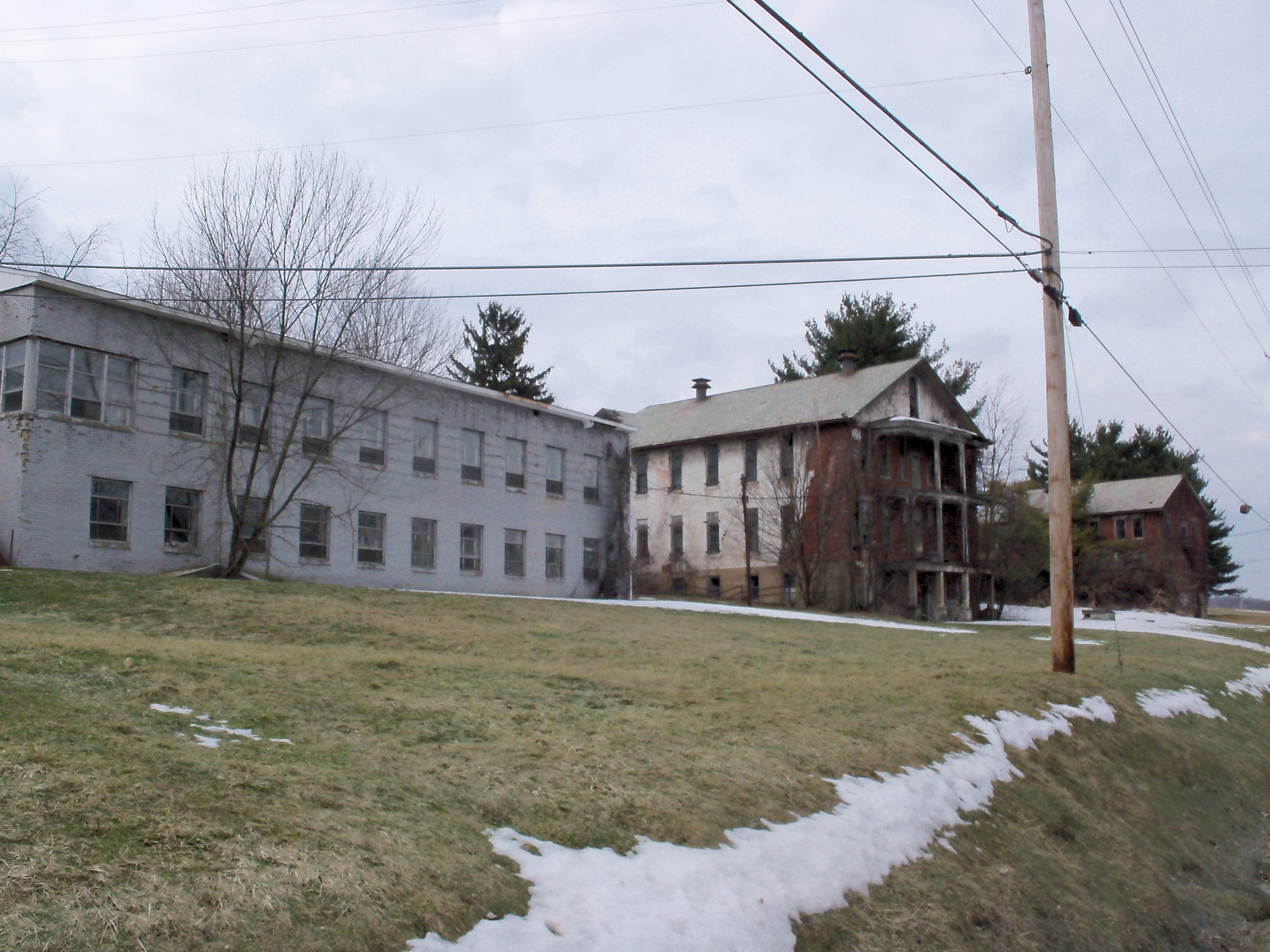
- Columbiana County Infirmary

- Location within Ohio Location within the United States
- Nearest city: Lisbon, Ohio
- Coordinates: 40°46′40″N 80°49′42″W
- Area: 1.5 acres (0.61 ha)
- Built: 1845
- NRHP reference No.: 79001795
- Added to NRHP: June 20, 1979

The Columbiana County Infirmary is located near Lisbon, Ohio. The four building complex provided care for the poor and mentally ill of the county. In 1829, The county commissioners, on the belief that the best environment for the indigent population was farm labor, purchased a farm consisting of 200 acres (81 ha). By 1861 a large T-shaped building was constructed.

The Infirmary is now closed. It was added to the National Register of Historic Places in June 1979.
