= Moultrie, Ohio =

Unincorporated community in Ohio, U.S.

Coordinates: 40°47′47″N 81°04′15″W

Moultrie is an unincorporated community in Columbiana County, in the U.S. state of Ohio.

== History ==
Moultrie was laid out in 1853. A post office called Moultrie was established in 1852, and remained in operation until 1944. Besides the post office, Moultrie had a gristmill, built in 1875.
