= Mill Rock, Ohio =

Unincorporated community in Ohio, U.S.

Coordinates: 40°47′53″N 80°35′29″W

Mill Rock is an unincorporated community in Columbiana County, in the U.S. state of Ohio.

== History ==
A stone watermill was built at the site of Mill Rock in 1808. A post office called Mill Rock was established in 1876, the name was changed to Millrock in 1895, and the post office closed in 1904.
