= Achor, Ohio =

- Unincorporated community
- Location within Ohio Location within the United States
- Coordinates: 40°46′27″N 80°32′30″W
- Country: United States
- State: Ohio
- County: Columbiana
- Township: Middleton
- Elevation: 830 ft (253 m)
- Time zone: UTC-5 (Eastern (EST))
  - Summer (DST): UTC-4 (EDT)
- ZIP code: 44441
- Area codes: 330, 234
- FIPS code: 39/00170
- GNIS feature ID: 1064293

Achor is an unincorporated community in Middleton Township, Columbiana County, Ohio, United States. It lies a few miles south of the community of Negley and just west of the state border with Pennsylvania. Once a leading settlement in the eastern portion of the county, it is now virtually a ghost town.

== History ==
Achor was originally called "The Valley of Achor", and under the latter name was platted around 1806. Variant names included Achorston, Achortown, Anchorstown, and Middleton. A post office called Achor was established in 1816, and remained in operation until 1901.

In 2020, the Valley of Achor Baptist Church, the only original building of the community still standing, burned down. An EF1 tornado struck Achor on April 8, 2020.
