= Teegarden, Ohio =

Unincorporated community in the U.S.

Coordinates: 40°49′22″N 80°49′43″W

Teegarden is an unincorporated community in Columbiana County, in the U.S. state of Ohio.

== History ==
A post office called Teegarden was established in 1870, and remained in operation until 1929. Teegarden was located on the Erie Railroad. Uriah Teegarden was a local landowner near the Teegarden Station.
