= Columbiana County Career and Technical Center =

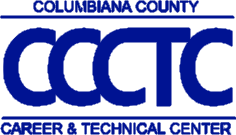

Location
- 9364 State Route 45; Lisbon, Ohio 44432; United States
- Coordinates: 40°46′0″N 80°44′52″W

Information
- Type: Public, Coeducational high school
- Superintendent: Willard Adkins
- Head of school: Jeremy Corbisello
- Principal: Jordan Williams
- Grades: 11-Adult
- Accreditation: Commission of the Council on Occupational Education
- Website: http://www.ccctc.k12.oh.us/

The Columbiana County Career and Technical Center (CCCTC) is a public vocational school in Lisbon, Ohio, United States. It is composed of a high school, whose main focus is on preparing high school students for future careers, and an Adult education center.

Entering their third and fourth years of traditional high school, students in Columbiana County may elect to attend the CCCTC as either a part-time student, taking core courses at their respective high schools while taking career or technical education at the career center, or as a full-time student taking both vocational and traditional curricula. Students may choose to take training in automotives, construction technology, cosmetology, culinary arts, health sciences, information technology, multimedia, landscape & environmental design, precision machining, veterinary science, and welding.
