= Fairfield Township, Columbiana County, Ohio =

Township in Ohio, US

- Township
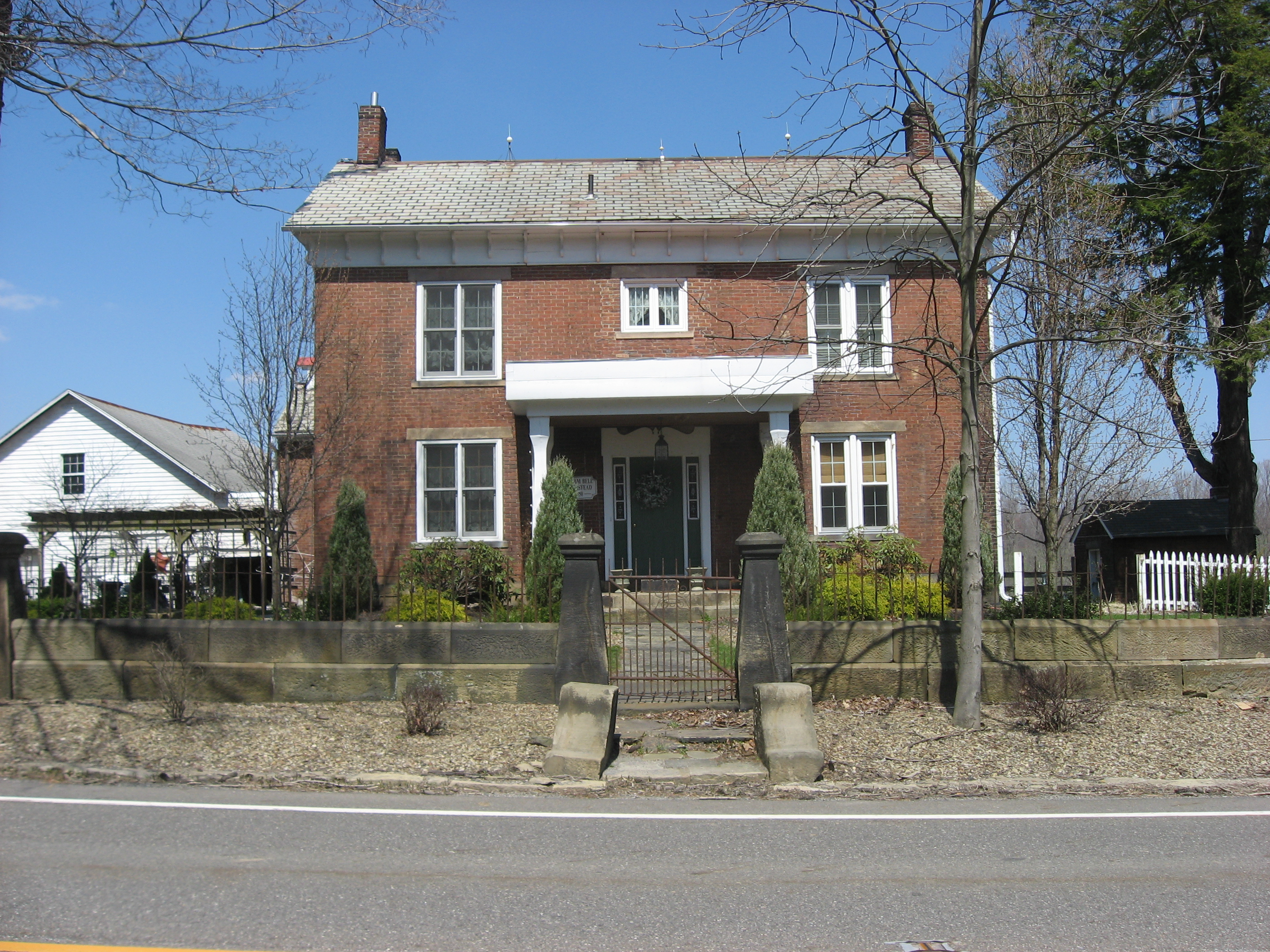
- The Hiram Bell Farmstead, a historic house in Fairfield Township

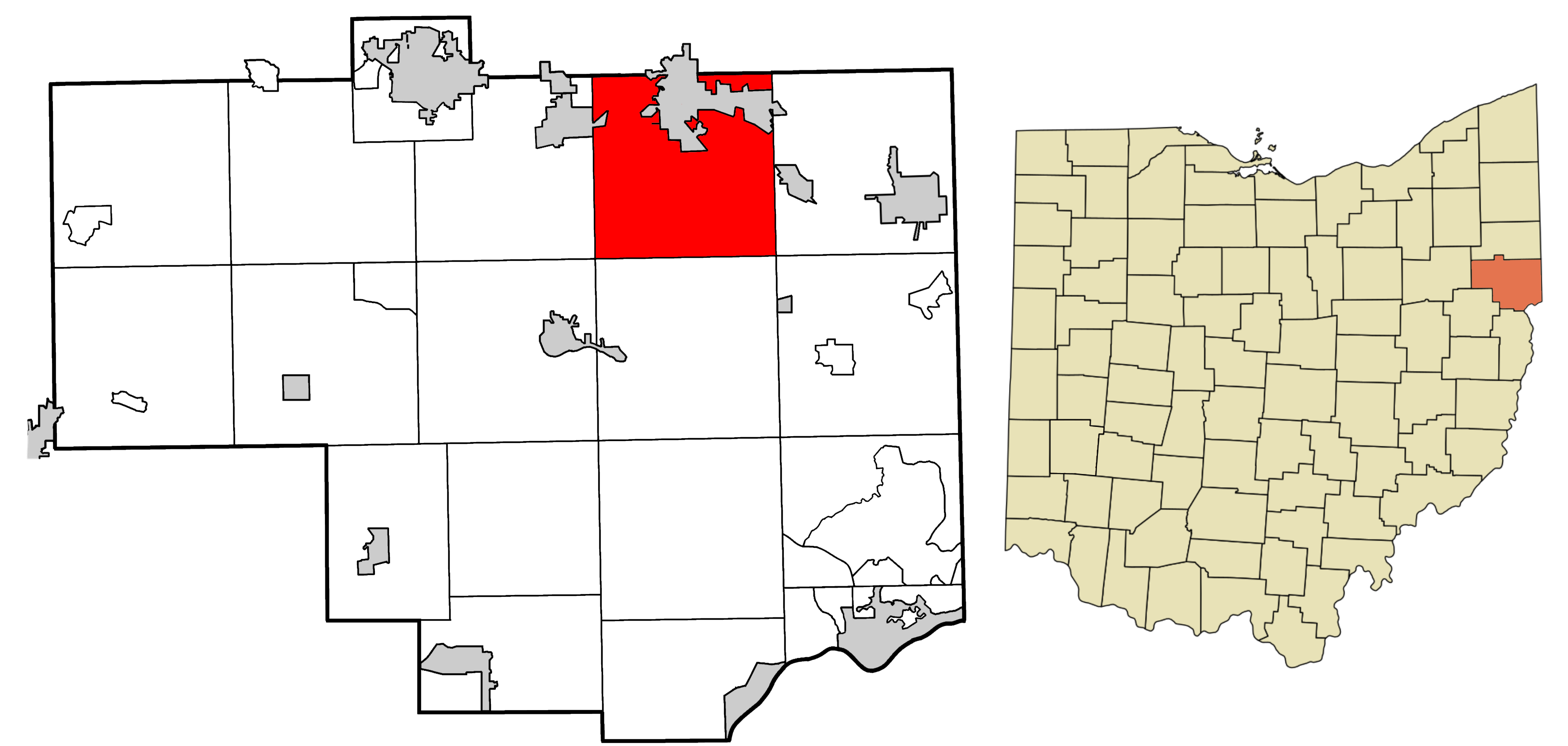
- Location of Fairfield Township in Columbiana County
- Coordinates: 40°52′38″N 80°41′16″W
- Country: United States
- State: Ohio
- County: Columbiana, Mahoning

Government
  - Type: Board of Trustees
  - Chairman: Barry Miner

Area
  - Total: 36.549 sq mi (94.66 km^{2})
  - Land: 36.405 sq mi (94.29 km^{2})
  - Water: 0.144 sq mi (0.37 km^{2})
- Elevation: 1,165 ft (355 m)

Population (2020)
  - Total: 9,769
  - Density: 268.3/sq mi (103.6/km^{2})
- Time zone: UTC-5 (Eastern (EST))
  - Summer (DST): UTC-4 (EDT)
- FIPS code: 39-25998
- GNIS feature ID: 1085893
- Website: sites.google.com/a/fairfieldtownshipohio.com/fairfieldtownshipohio/

Fairfield Township is one of the eighteen townships of Columbiana County, Ohio, United States, extending into southern Mahoning County. The 2020 census reported 9,769 people living in the township.

== Geography ==
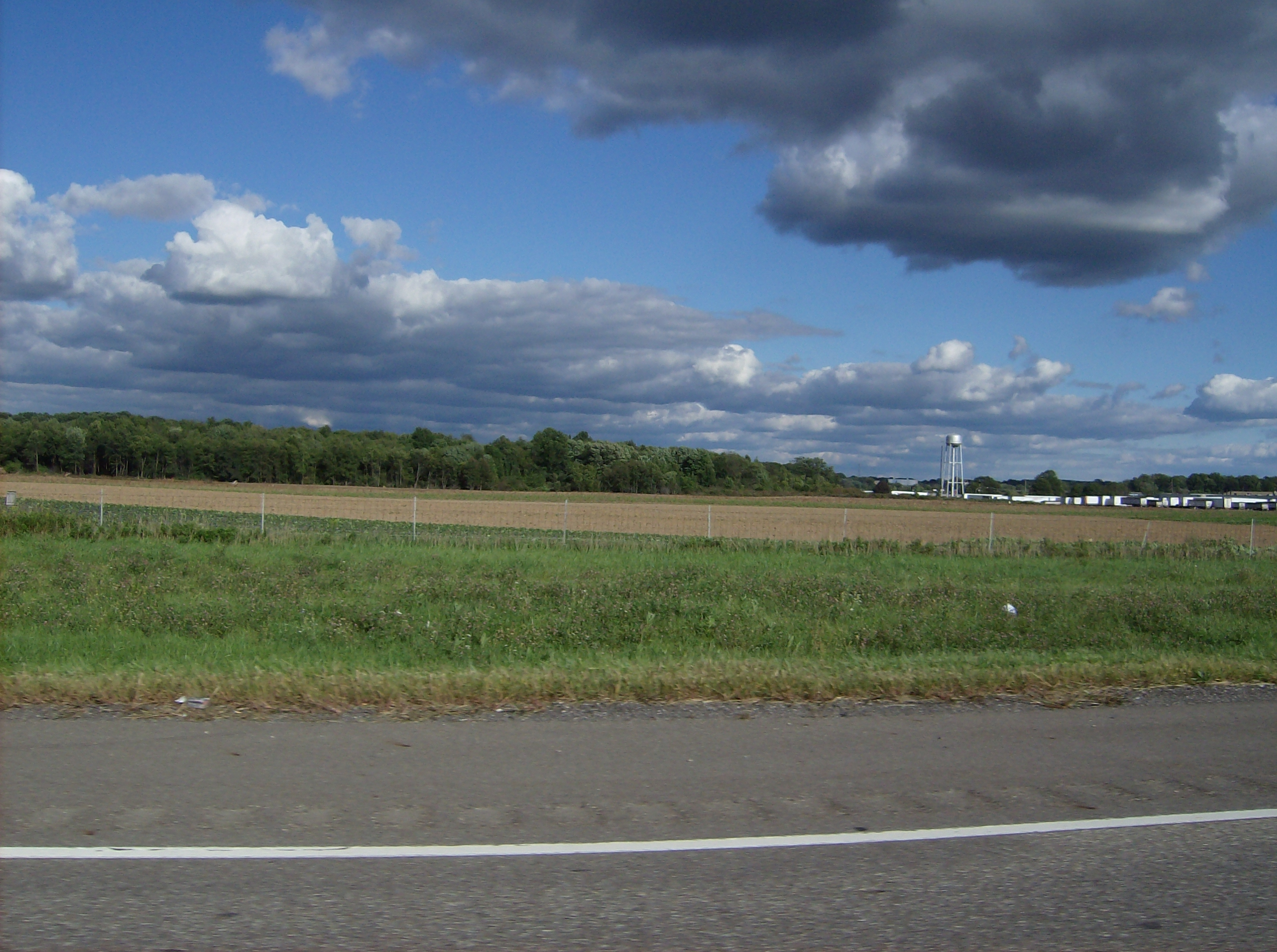
Woods and fields are found in the less developed areas of Fairfield Township.

Fairfield Township is located in northeastern Columbiana County and southern Mahoning County, where it is largely but not entirely coextensive with the Columbiana city limits. Ohio is the only state that allows a single township to exist in multiple counties.

Fairfield Township borders the following townships:

- Beaver Township, Mahoning County - north
- Springfield Township, Mahoning County - northeast corner
- Unity Township - east
- Middleton Township - southeast corner
- Elkrun Township - south
- Center Township - southwest corner
- Salem Township - west
- Green Township, Mahoning County - northwest corner

One city and one village are located in Fairfield Township:

- The city of Columbiana, in the north
- The eastern tip of the village of Leetonia, in the northwest

== Name ==
It is one of seven Fairfield Townships statewide.

== History ==
Historical population
Census	Pop.	Note	%±
1980	8,996		—
1990	8,981		−0.2%
2000	9,583		6.7%
2010	9,890		3.2%
2020	9,769		−1.2%

The township was organized in 1806. The first permanent settler was known to be Mathias Lower who emigrated from Westmoreland County, Pennsylvania in 1800.

== Government ==
The township is governed by a three-member board of trustees, who are elected in November of odd-numbered years to a four-year term beginning on the following January 1. Two are elected in the year after the presidential election and one is elected in the year before it. There is also an elected township fiscal officer, who serves a four-year term beginning on April 1 of the year after the election, which is held in November of the year before the presidential election. Vacancies in the fiscal officership or on the board of trustees are filled by the remaining trustees.

=== Township Trustees ===
- Bob Hum, Chairman
- Barry A. Miner, Vice Chairman
- John Garwood

=== Fiscal Officer ===
- Emily Wilms
