= East Carmel, Ohio =

Unincorporated community in Ohio, U.S.

Coordinates: 40°46′37″N 80°36′50″W

East Carmel is an unincorporated community in Columbiana County, in the U.S. state of Ohio.

== History ==
Waterford was the name of a town site platted in 1806 near present-day East Carmel, but no lots were sold and the project was considered a failure. A post office called East Carmel was established in 1870, and remained in operation until 1904.
