= Franklin Township, Columbiana County, Ohio =

Township in Ohio, US

- Township
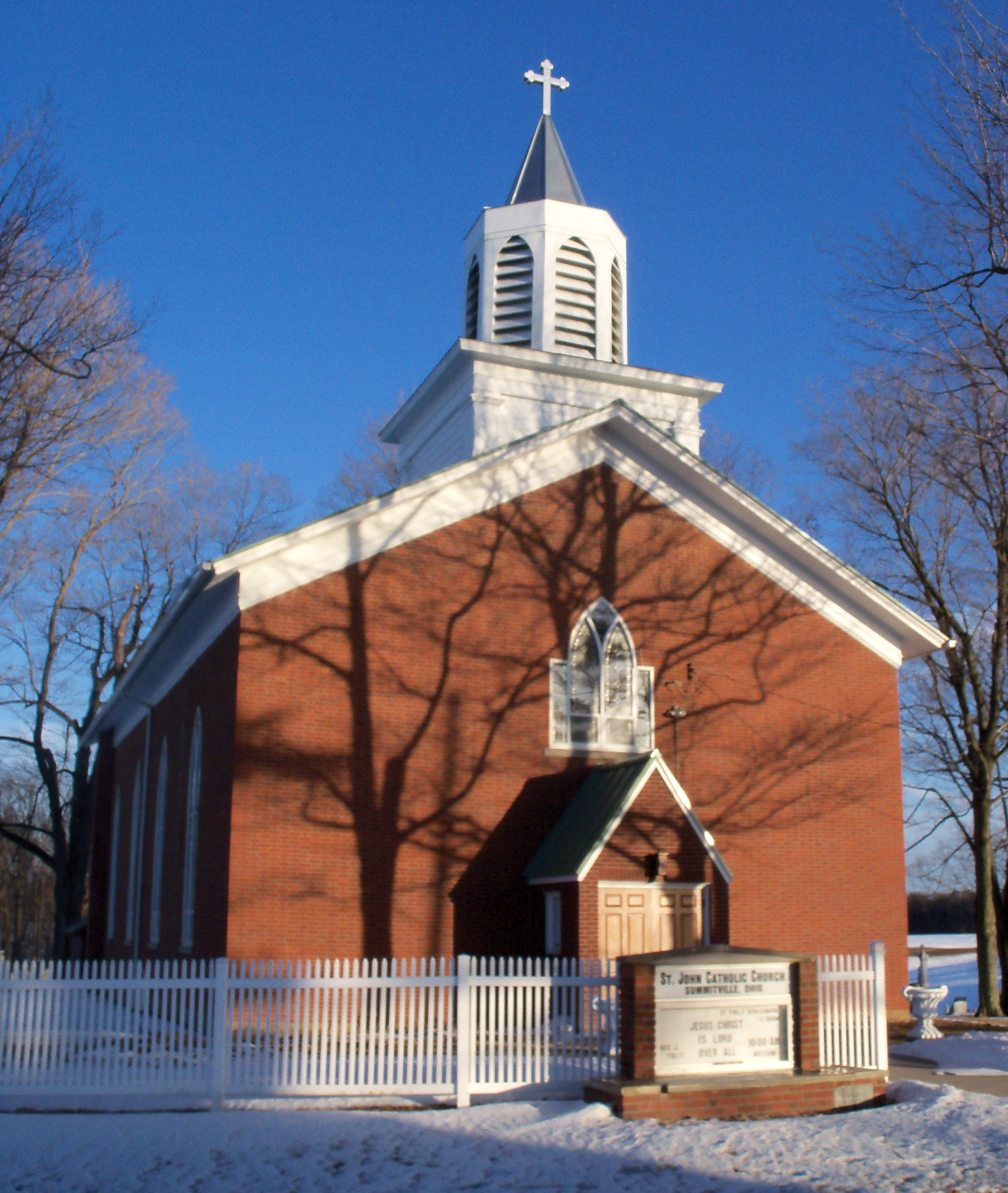
- St John Catholic Church, on hill above Summitville

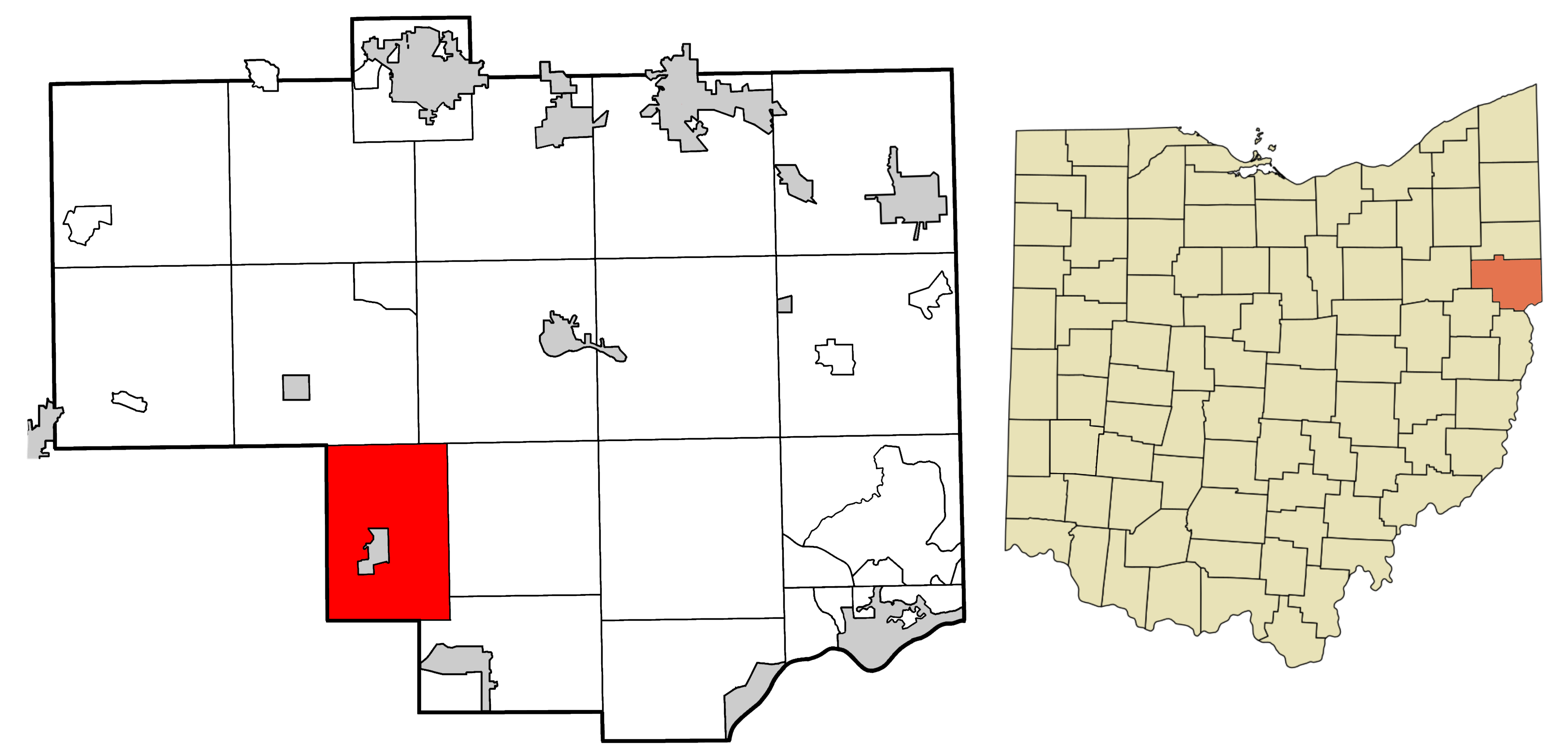
- Location of Franklin Township in Columbiana County
- Coordinates: 40°41′18″N 80°53′13″W
- Country: United States
- State: Ohio
- County: Columbiana

Area
  - Total: 23.1 sq mi (59.7 km^{2})
  - Land: 23.0 sq mi (59.6 km^{2})
  - Water: 0.077 sq mi (0.2 km^{2})
- Elevation: 1,093 ft (333 m)

Population (2020)
  - Total: 735
  - Density: 31.9/sq mi (12.3/km^{2})
- Time zone: UTC-5 (Eastern (EST))
  - Summer (DST): UTC-4 (EDT)
- FIPS code: 39-28238
- GNIS feature ID: 1085894

Franklin Township is one of the eighteen townships of Columbiana County, Ohio, United States. The 2020 census reported 735 people living in the township.

== Geography ==
Located in the southwestern part of the county, it borders the following townships:

- Center Township - northeast
- Wayne Township - east
- Washington Township - southeast
- Fox Township, Carroll County - southwest
- East Township, Carroll County - west
- Hanover Township - northwest

One village is located in Franklin Township:

- The village of Summitville, in the west

== Name and history ==
Historical population
Census	Pop.	Note	%±
1980	831		—
1990	777		−6.5%
2000	766		−1.4%
2010	835		9.0%
2020	735		−12.0%

It is one of twenty-one Franklin Townships statewide. The township was organized in 1816.

== Government ==
The township is governed by a three-member board of trustees, who are elected in November of odd-numbered years to a four-year term beginning on the following January 1. Two are elected in the year after the presidential election and one is elected in the year before it. There is also an elected township fiscal officer, who serves a four-year term beginning on April 1 of the year after the election, which is held in November of the year before the presidential election. Vacancies in the fiscal officership or on the board of trustees are filled by the remaining trustees.

=== Township Trustees ===
- Joe Medure, Chairman
- Mike Lutz, Vice Chairman
- Mike Johnson

=== Fiscal Officer ===
- Britnie Baker
