= Southern Local Junior/Senior High School =

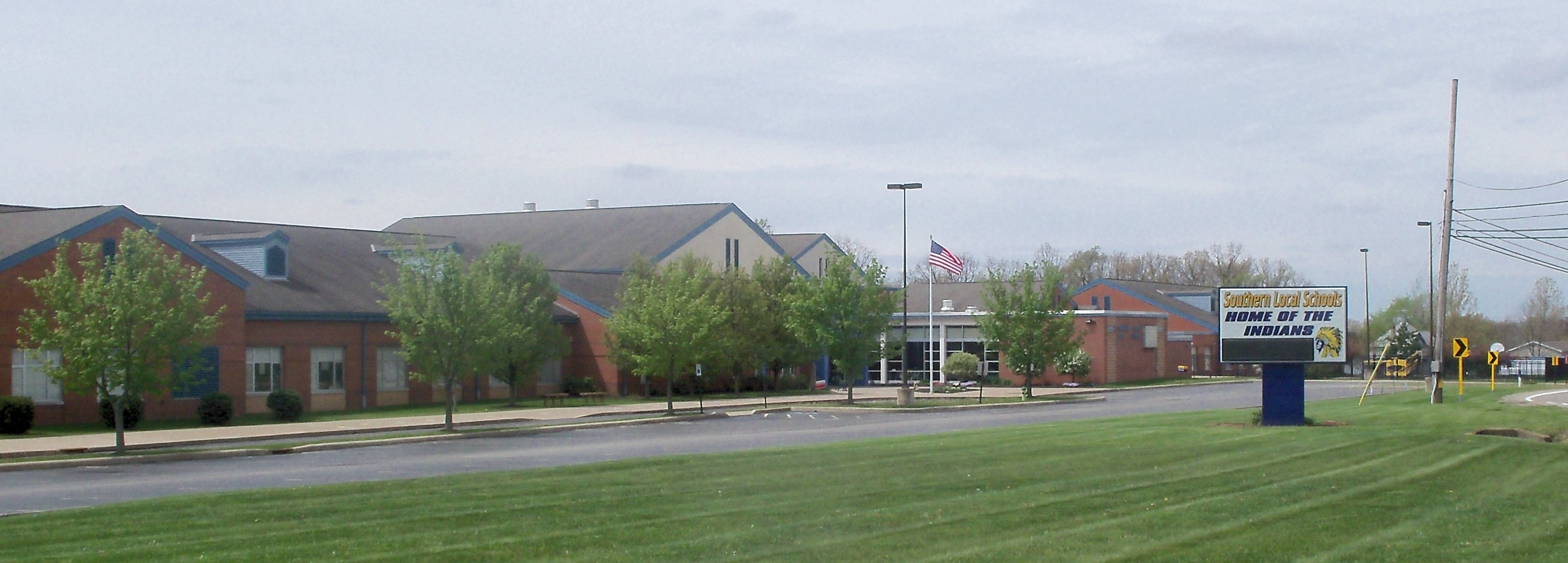

Location
- 38095 State Route 39; Salineville, Columbiana, Ohio 43945; United States
- Coordinates: 40°38′20″N 80°46′57″W

Information
- Type: Public high school
- Established: 1963
- School district: Southern Local School District
- Superintendent: Tom Cunningham
- Principal: Jess Krulik
- Teaching staff: 22.10 (FTE)
- Grades: 7–12
- Student to teacher ratio: 17.69
- Campus type: Distant rural
- Colors: Blue and gold
- Athletics conference: Eastern Ohio Athletic Conference; Ohio Valley Athletic Conference
- Nickname: Indians
- Yearbook: Warrior
- Website: slhs.southern.k12.oh.us

Southern Local Junior/Senior High School is a public high school near Salineville, Ohio, United States. It is the only high school in the Southern Local School District. Athletic teams are known as the Southern Local Indians and compete as a member of the Ohio High School Athletic Association in the Eastern Ohio Athletic Conference and the Ohio Valley Athletic Conference.

== Academics ==
Southern Local Junior/Senior High School offers courses in the traditional American curriculum. Entering their third and fourth years, students can elect to attend the Columbiana County Career and Technical Center in Lisbon as either a part-time or full-time student.

== Athletics ==
Southern Local Junior/Senior High School currently offers:

- Baseball
- Basketball
- Cross country running
- Football
- Golf
- Softball
- Track and field
- Volleyball
- Wrestling
