= Summitville, Ohio =

- Village
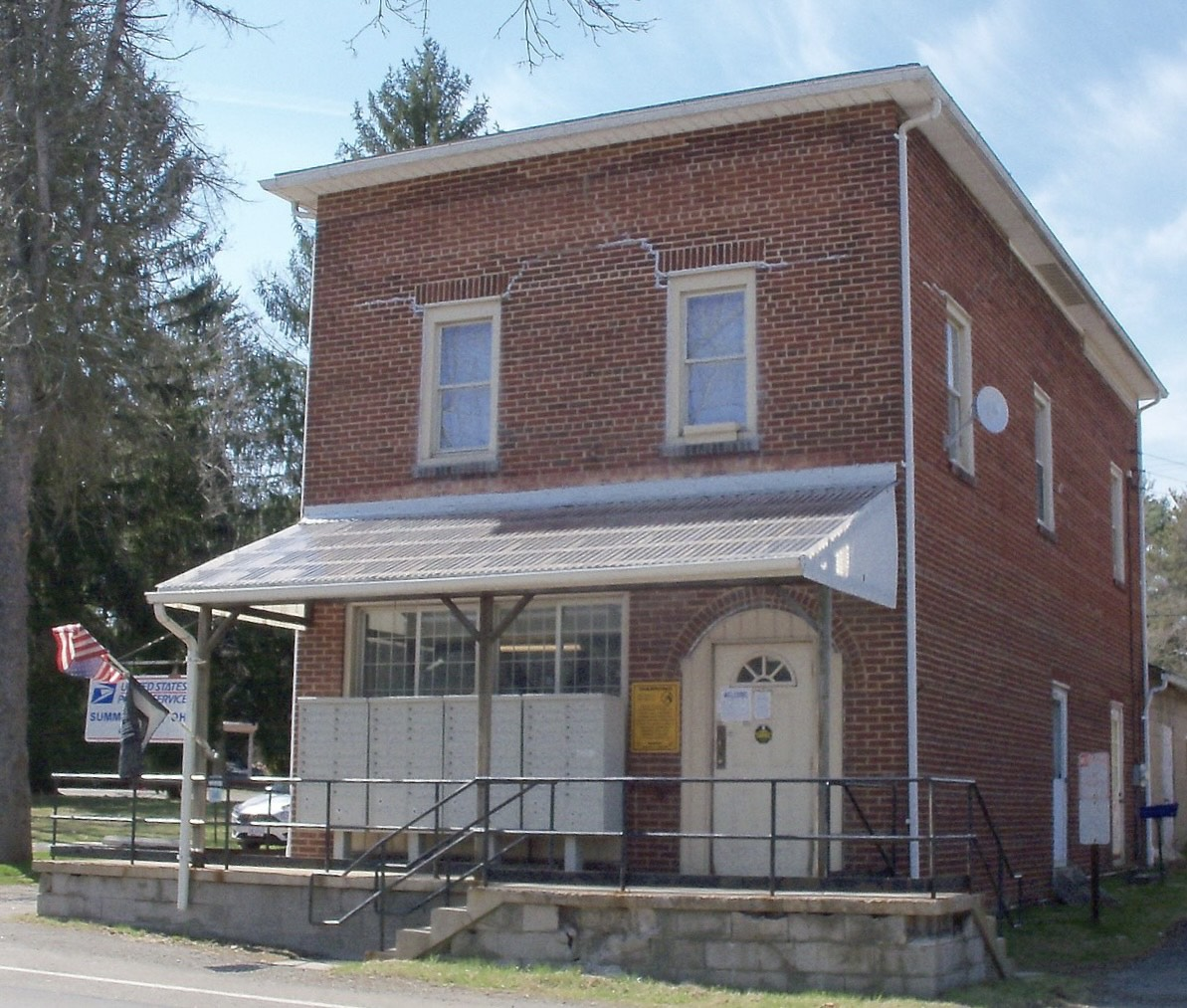
- Summitville Post Office
- Interactive map of Summitville, Ohio
- Location within Ohio Location within the United States
- Coordinates: 40°40′33″N 80°53′15″W
- Country: United States
- State: Ohio
- County: Columbiana

Government
  - Type: Mayor-Council
  - Mayor: Aiden Brothers

Area
  - Total: 0.95 sq mi (2.46 km^{2})
  - Land: 0.92 sq mi (2.39 km^{2})
  - Water: 0.027 sq mi (0.07 km^{2})
- Elevation: 1,119 ft (341 m)

Population (2020)
  - Total: 110
  - Density: 119.0/sq mi (45.95/km^{2})
- Time zone: UTC-5 (Eastern (EST))
  - Summer (DST): UTC-4 (EDT)
- ZIP code: 43962
- Area codes: 330, 234
- FIPS code: 39-75574
- GNIS feature ID: 2399931
- School District: Southern Local School District

Summitville is a village in Columbiana County, Ohio, United States. The population was 110 at the 2020 census.

== History ==
Summitville was laid out in 1853. The village was named on account of its lofty elevation near one of the highest points between the Sandy Creek and Lake Erie.

== Geography ==
According to the United States Census Bureau, the village has a total area of 0.95 square miles (2.46 km^{2}), of which 0.92 square miles (2.38 km^{2}) is land and 0.03 square miles (0.08 km^{2}) is water. It is approximately 25 miles (40 km) miles southeast of Canton and 30 miles (48 km) southwest of Youngstown.

== Demographics ==
Historical population
Census	Pop.	Note	%±
1950	150		—
1960	144		−4.0%
1970	143		−0.7%
1980	146		2.1%
1990	125		−14.4%
2000	108		−13.6%
2010	135		25.0%
2020	110		−18.5%
U.S. Decennial Census

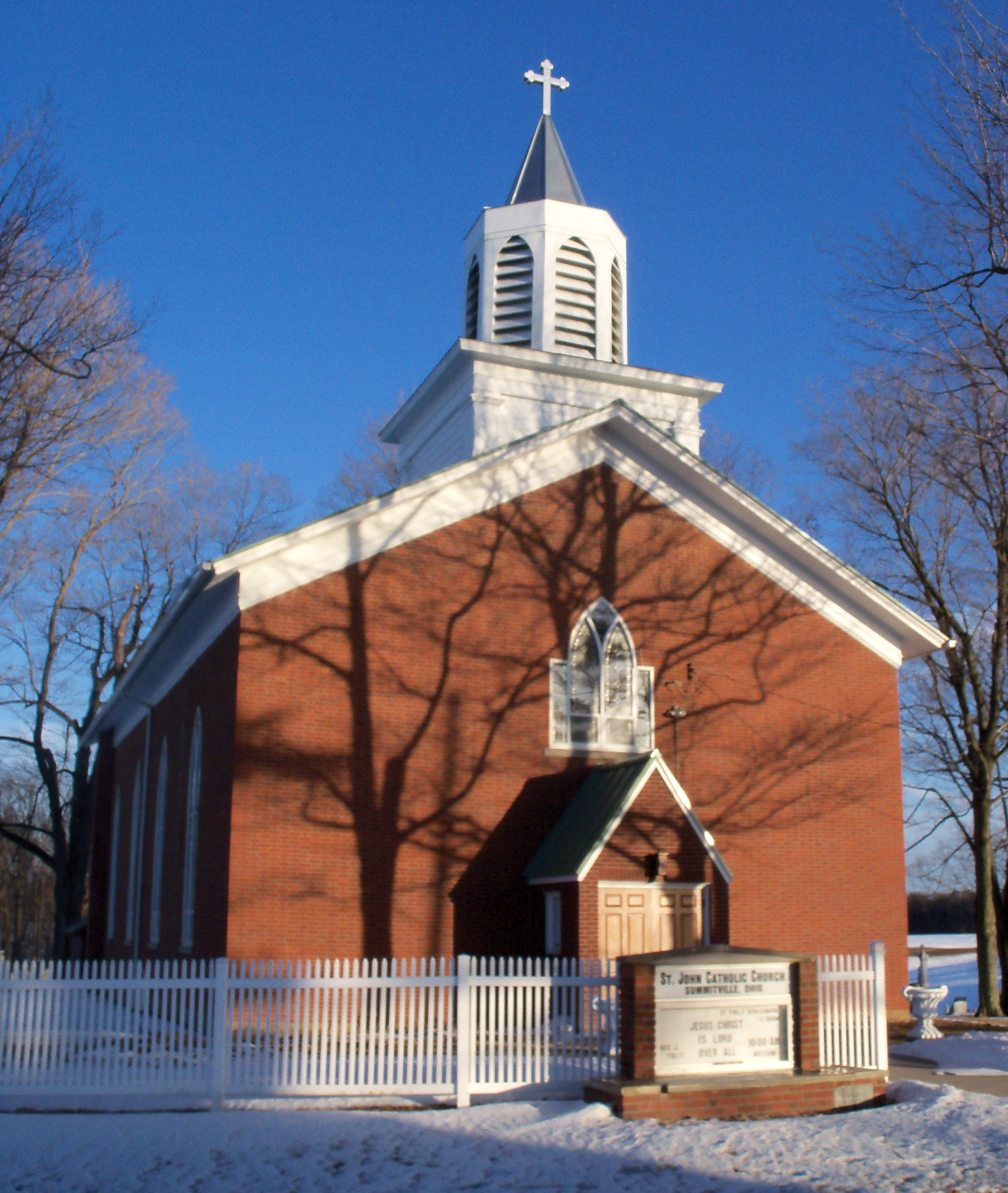
St. John the Evangelist Roman Catholic Parish

=== 2010 census ===
As of the census of 2010, there were 135 people, 51 households, and 39 families living in the village. The population density was 146.7 inhabitants per square mile (56.6/km^{2}). There were 55 housing units at an average density of 59.8 per square mile (23.1/km^{2}). The racial makeup of the village was 95.6% White, 0.7% African American, and 3.7% from two or more races. Hispanic or Latino of any race were 4.4% of the population.

There were 51 households, of which 33.3% had children under the age of 18 living with them, 64.7% were married couples living together, 5.9% had a female householder with no husband present, 5.9% had a male householder with no wife present, and 23.5% were non-families. 17.6% of all households were made up of individuals, and 11.7% had someone living alone who was 65 years of age or older. The average household size was 2.65 and the average family size was 3.00.

The median age in the village was 38.2 years. 25.9% of residents were under the age of 18; 6.7% were between the ages of 18 and 24; 24.4% were from 25 to 44; 23.7% were from 45 to 64; and 19.3% were 65 years of age or older. The gender makeup of the village was 50.4% male and 49.6% female.

=== 2000 census ===
As of the census of 2000, there were 108 people, 45 households, and 31 families living in the village. The population density was 116.1 inhabitants per square mile (44.8/km^{2}). There were 49 housing units at an average density of 52.7 per square mile (20.3/km^{2}). The racial makeup of the village was 97.22% White, and 2.78% from two or more races. Hispanic or Latino of any race were 0.93% of the population.

There were 45 households, out of which 28.9% had children under the age of 18 living with them, 57.8% were married couples living together, 13.3% had a female householder with no husband present, and 28.9% were non-families. 26.7% of all households were made up of individuals, and 15.6% had someone living alone who was 65 years of age or older. The average household size was 2.40 and the average family size was 2.94.

In the village, the population was spread out, with 26.9% under the age of 18, 5.6% from 18 to 24, 25.9% from 25 to 44, 28.7% from 45 to 64, and 13.0% who were 65 years of age or older. The median age was 40 years. For every 100 females there were 74.2 males. For every 100 females age 18 and over, there were 68.1 males.

The median income for a household in the village was $26,250, and the median income for a family was $38,750. Males had a median income of $31,250 versus $17,143 for females. The per capita income for the village was $17,236. There were 13.3% of families and 15.7% of the population living below the poverty line, including 36.4% of under eighteens and none of those over 64.

== Government ==
Summitville operates under a mayor–council government, where there are six council members elected as a legislature in addition to an independently elected mayor who serves as an executive. As of 2026, the mayor is Aiden Brothers. In addition, there is an elected village clerk and treasurer; the position was combined in 1998.

== Education ==
Children in Summitville are served by the public Southern Local School District, which operates a K-12 complex in Washington Township. The renovated complex was built by adding to what was then the Southern Local High School building and was completed in 2004. The complex includes one elementary school and Southern Local Junior/Senior High School.

== Notable people ==
- John Wargo, member of the Ohio House of Representatives
