= Inter-Tri County League (OHSAA) =

Defunct high school athletic conference in Ohio

The Inter-Tri County League was an Ohio High School Athletic Association athletic conference. It was made up of member schools from Columbiana, Mahoning and Trumbull counties in Ohio. The league existed from 2006 until 2015.

== Members ==
School	Location	Nickname	Colors	Tenure	Notes
Blue Division
Jackson-Milton	North Jackson	Blue Jays	Royal Blue & White	2006-2017	left for MVAC
Lowellville	Lowellville	Rockets	Navy & Gold	2006-2017	left for MVAC
Mineral Ridge	Weathersfield	Rams	Orange & Black	2006-2017	left for MVAC
McDonald	McDonald	Blue Devils	Blue & Gold	2006-2017	left for MVAC
Sebring McKinley	Sebring	Trojans	Purple & Gold	2006-2017	left for MVAC
Western Reserve	Berlin Center	Blue Devils	Blue, Red & White	2006-2017	left for MVAC
Red Division
Crestview	Columbiana	Rebels	Black & Gold	2006-2017	left for OVAC
East Palestine	East Palestine	Bulldogs	Brown and White	2006-2017	left for EOAC
South Range	Canfield	Raiders	Burgundy, Gold	2006-2017	left to become independent
Springfield	New Middletown	Tigers	Orange & Black	2006-2017	left for MVAC
United	Hanoverton	Golden Eagles	Blue and Gold	2006-2017	left for EOAC
White Division
David Anderson	Lisbon	Blue Devils	Blue and White	2006-2017	left for EOAC
Columbiana	Columbiana	Clippers	Red and White	2006-2017	left for EOAC
Leetonia	Leetonia	Bears	Blue and White	2006-2017	left for EOAC
Southern Local	Salineville	Indians	Blue and Gold	2006-2017	left for EOAC
Wellsville	Wellsville	Tigers	Orange & Black	2006-2017	left for EOAC

== History ==
The Inter-Tri County League was formed in 2006, as a result of a merger between two former OHSAA conferences, the Inter-County League and the Tri-County League, with founding members such as McDonald, Mineral Ridge, Jackson-Milton, Western Reserve, Lowellville, Sebring, Columbiana, Lisbon, Leetonia, East Palestine, Wellsville, Southern Local, United Local, Springfield, South Range and others.

In 2015, the ITCL moved to a three-tier system compared to its two-tier system it used since its founding in 2006, to help reduce travel costs.

In 2016, despite efforts to save the league, member schools announced they would be disbanding the ITCL. The Blue Division members would go on to form the Mahoning Valley Athletic Conference, while members of both the Red and White Divisions went on to form the Eastern Ohio Athletic Conference. South Range became independent and later joined the Northeast 8, Crestview left for the Ohio Valley Athletic Conference and later joined the MVAC in 2020.
