= Eastern Ohio Athletic Conference (OHSAA) =

High school athletic conference in Ohio

The Eastern Ohio Athletic Conference (EOAC) is an Ohio High School Athletic Association high school athletic conference that began competition in the 2017–18 school year and is made up of member schools from Columbiana and Mahoning counties in Ohio. The league was formed from members of the red and white tiers of the former Inter-Tri County League.

== Members ==
School	Nickname	Location	Colors	Tenure	Notes
Columbiana	Clippers	Columbiana	Red and white	2017–	
David Anderson	Blue Devils	Lisbon	Blue and white	2017–	
East Palestine	Bulldogs	East Palestine	Brown and white	2017–	
Southern Local	Indians	Salineville	Blue and gold	2017–	
United	Golden Eagles	Hanoverton	Blue and gold	2017–	
Wellsville	Tigers	Wellsville	Orange and black	2017–	
Valley Christian	Eagles	Youngstown	Blue and gold	2020–	

=== Future members ===
School	Location	Nickname	Colors	Year joining	Notes
Western Reserve	Berlin Center	Blue Devils	Blue, red & white	2027	Joining in 2027 from Mahoning Valley Athletic Conference

== Former members ==
School	Nickname	Location	Colors	Tenure	Notes
Leetonia	Bears	Leetonia	Blue and white	2017–2026	Leftfor Northeastern Athletic Conference
Toronto	Red Knights	Toronto	Red and White	2017–2019	Left for OVAC

== History ==
The Eastern Ohio Athletic Conference was formed when the Inter-Tri County League disbanded in 2016. Seven members of the red and white tiers of the ITCL would form the EOAC (Columbiana, Lisbon, East Palestine, Leetonia, Southern, Toronto, United and Wellsville.) conference play began in the fall 2017–18 season.

Toronto announced they would forfeit its membership in the EOAC after two seasons of membership. They left following the 2018–19 school year, citing different reasons for their departure such as financial reasons from higher league and official costs, and lower crowds of both home and away games due to traveling distance between member schools. Toronto had rejoined its previous conference, the Ohio Valley Athletic Conference.

Youngstown Valley Christian accepted its invitation to join the EOAC in 2019, with them beginning conference play in the 2020–21 school year. They were previously a member of the Portage Trail Conference but left due to wanting to compete with schools closer to enrollment size and travel distance.

Leetonia, who is one of the EOAC's founding members, announced in 2025 they will be departing from the league following the 2025–26 school year, with them joining the Northeastern Athletic Conference in hopes of playing schools closer in size and competition to them.

The EOAC extended an invited to Western Reserve, after they announced in April 2026 that they would be leaving the Mahoning Valley Athletic Conference. The Western Reserve board of education voted in May 2026 to join the EOAC beginning the 2027–28 school year.

== Conference championships ==
Conference Championships of the EOAC since 2017

Year	Football	Volleyball	Boys Soccer	Girls Soccer	Boys Basketball	Girls Basketball	Baseball	Softball
2025–26	United	Columbiana	United	Columbiana	Lisbon/Columbiana	Southern		
2024–25	United	Columbiana	United	United	Valley Christian	Columbiana	United	Columbiana
2023–24	United	Columbiana	United	United	Lisbon	Columbiana/United/Southern	Columbiana	Columbiana
2022–23	Valley Christian	Wellsville	United	United	Southern	United	Columbiana	Columbiana
2021–22	United	Wellsville	United	United	Wellsville	United	United	Columbiana
2020–21	United	Wellsville	United	United	Southern	East Palestine	Columbiana	Columbiana
2019–20	Southern	Wellsville	United	United	Columbiana	Columbiana	NO SEASON - COVID	NO SEASON - COVID
2018–19	Southern	Wellsville	United	United	Toronto	Columbiana	Toronto	Lisbon
2017–18	East Palestine	Southern	United	United	Toronto	Columbiana	Toronto	United
