= Mahoning Valley Athletic Conference =

High school athletic conference from Ohio

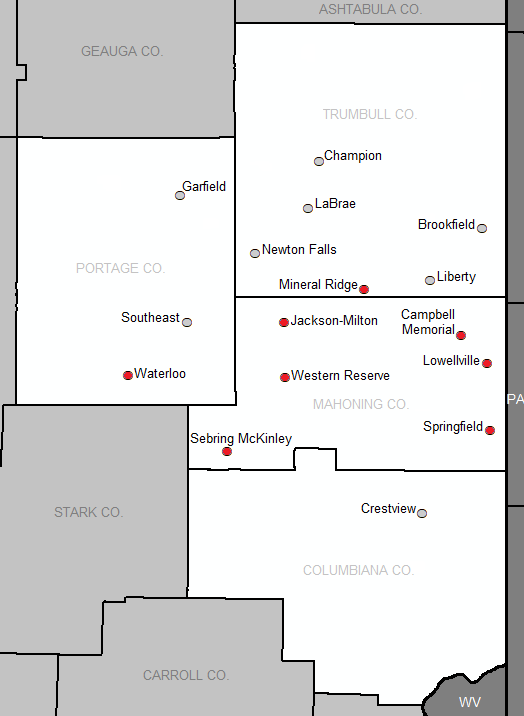
Map of the Mahoning Valley Athletic Conference Members as of 2025

The Mahoning Valley Athletic Conference is an athletic conference that is part of the Ohio High School Athletic Association, with member schools from Trumbull, Portage, Mahoning and Columbiana Counties.

== Members ==
School	Location	Nickname	Colors	Year joined	Notes
Gray Tier
Brookfield	Brookfield	Warriors	Blue & gold	2020	Leaving for Northeastern Athletic Conference in 2027
Champion	Champion Township	Flashes	Purple & gold	2020	Leaving for Northeastern Athletic Conference in 2027
Crestview	Columbiana	Rebels	Black & gold	2020	Leaving for Ohio Valley Athletic Conference in 2027
Garfield	Garrettsville	G-Men	Black & yellow	2021	Joined in 2021 from Portage Trail Conference, leaving in 2027 for Greater Portage Athletic Conference
LaBrae	Leavittsburg	Vikings	Red & gray	2020	Leaving for Northeastern Athletic Conference in 2027
Liberty	Liberty Township	Leopards	Maroon & gold	2020	Leaving for Northeastern Athletic Conference in 2027
Newton Falls	Newton Falls	Tigers	Orange & black	2020	Moving to Scarlet Tier in 2027
Southeast	Palmyra Township	Pirates	Maroon & gold	2024	Joined in 2024 from Portage Trail Conference, leaving in 2027 for Greater Portage Athletic Conference
Scarlet Tier
Jackson-Milton	North Jackson	Blue Jays	Royal blue & white	2017	
Lowellville	Lowellville	Rockets	Navy & gold	2017	
McDonald	McDonald	Blue Devils	Blue & white	2017	
Sebring McKinley	Sebring	Trojans	Purple & gold	2017	2017–2023 for football; moved to Northern 8 Football Conference
Campbell Memorial	Campbell	Red Devils	Red & black	2020	moved to Scarlet Tier from Gray Tier in 2024
Mineral Ridge	Weathersfield	Rams	Orange & black	2017	
Springfield	New Middletown	Tigers	Orange & black	2017	
Waterloo	Atwater	Vikings	Burgundy & white	2017	Leaving in 2027 for Greater Portage Athletic Conference
Western Reserve	Berlin Center	Blue Devils	Blue, red & white	2017	Leaving in 2027 for Eastern Ohio Athletic Conference

== History ==
The Mahoning Valley Athletic Conference was formed by several schools in the Trumbull and Mahoning County area in the 2017–18 school year after the Inter-Tri County League disbanded.

The remaining members of the Blue Tier Schools of the All-American Conference joined to create the Gray Tier of the MVAC in 2020. Garrettsville Garfield would also be joining the former AAC schools, however they wouldn't participate in conference play until the 2021–22 school year due to a scheduling commitment they had with their former conference, the Portage Trail Conference.

Sebring McKinley, after struggling with football roster numbers for several seasons, announced in 2022 their departure from the conference as a football member and that they would be joining the Northern 8 Football Conference in 2023. They, however, remained a part of the conference for other sports. Southeast announced in 2023 they would be leaving the Portage Trail Conference and join the Gray Tier of the MVAC. Campbell Memorial moved to the Scarlet Tier after the 2022–23 school year.

The school boards of Waterloo, Garfield, and Southeast approved plans in 2026 to leave the MVAC after the 2026–27 school year in favor of the newly formed Greater Portage Athletic Conference, which is set to begin conference play in the 2027–28 school year. Brookfield, Champion, LaBrae and Liberty announced on March 17, 2026, that they intend to leave the Mahoning Valley Athletic Conference to join the Northeastern Athletic Conference beginning the 2027–28 school year. Newton Falls announced that they would be moving over to the Scarlet Tier, once the remaining Gray Tier members leave, Crestview has also applied to join the Scarlet Tier, along with the Eastern Ohio Athletic Conference and Northeast 8 Athletic Conference with the option of becoming independent if they cannot find a new league in time. Western Reserve announced on April 11th that they will be leaving the MVAC after the 2026–27 school year. The Western Reserve board of education voted on May 11th to join the Eastern Ohio Athletic Conference beginning the 2027–28 school year. On November 4, the Crestview Rebels were officially accepted into the Ohio Valley Athletic Conference, and became eligible for conference championship contention, however will remain an MVAC member until the end of the 2026–27 school year.
