= Washingtonville =

Washingtonville may refer to one of three municipalities in the United States:

- Washingtonville, New York
- Washingtonville, Ohio
- Washingtonville, Pennsylvania

== See also ==
- List of places named for George Washington #Other
