= Charles Nelson Schmick House =

Historic house in Ohio, United States

- U.S. National Register of Historic Places
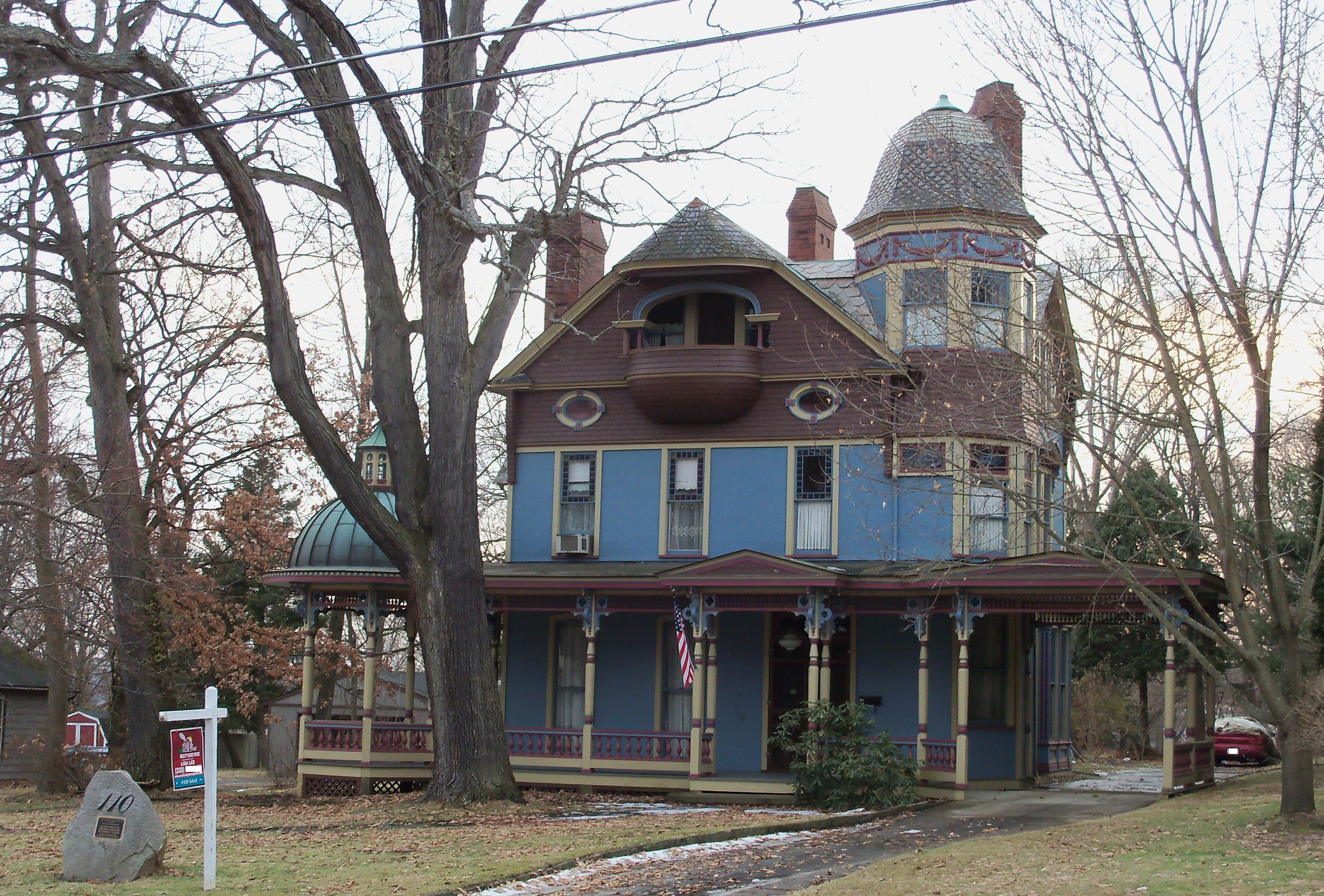
- Charles Nelson Schmick House

- Location within Ohio Location within the United States
- Location: 110 Walnut St., Leetonia, Ohio
- Coordinates: 40°52′47″N 80°45′36″W
- Area: less than one acre
- Built: 1870
- Architect: Moreland & Test
- Architectural style: Colonial Revival, Queen Anne, Italianate
- NRHP reference No.: 91000250
- Added to NRHP: March 21, 1991

The Charles Nelson Schmick House is located at 110 Walnut Street, Leetonia, Ohio. The three-story, 16-room house contains 5,700 square feet. There are stained glass windows, a wraparound porch, gingerbread detailing, and a tower. The house is listed in the National Register of Historic Places.

The Victorian home was completed in 1871. It exhibits Colonial Revival, Queen Anne, Italianate, and Empire architecture styles. The house was built by David A. Gerrish. The home was sold to Edwin J. Warner in 1874. Warner lived in the house from 1874 until 1879 while he was president of the Leetonia Iron & Coal Company.

Charles Nelson Schmick purchased the house in 1879. Schmick was a banker, industrialist, and school board member in Leetonia. He and his wife resided in the home with their children until 1900, when they moved to Cleveland.

In 1987, the house was purchased by Robert and Barbara Hendricks. The Hendricks began a complete restoration of house. The project was completed in August 1996. The home was restored from the basement foundation to the rooftop and was furnished with authentic antiques and reproduction Victorian wallpapers and window treatments.

The house was added to the National Register of Historic Places in 1991 for its significant architecture and for historical person, Charles Schmick.

The house was a bed & breakfast furnished with authentic antiques, reproduction wallpapers, and window treatments.

Today, the house is a private residence.
