= Lowellville Local School District =

School district in Ohio, United States

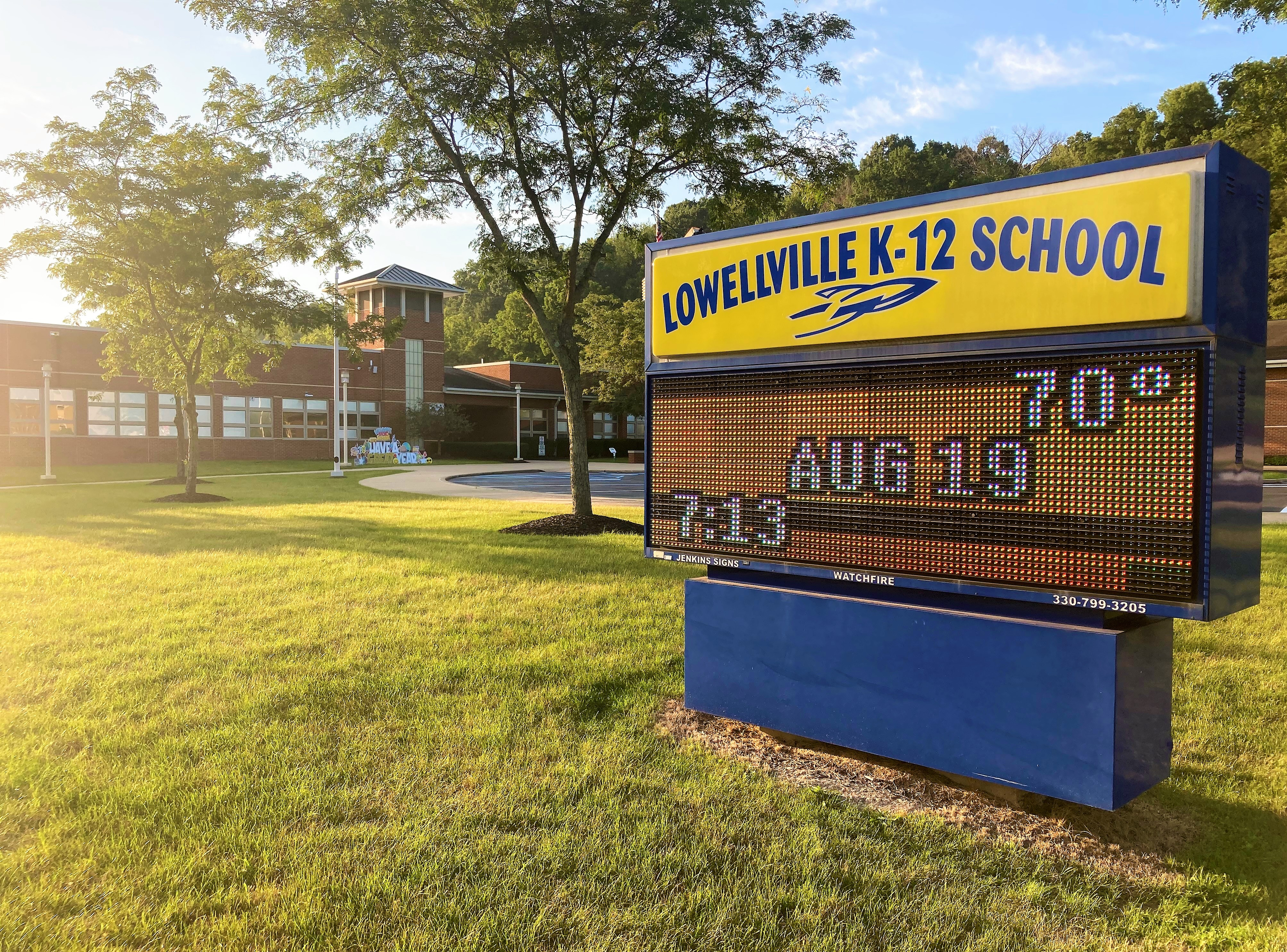
- Lowellville High School building entrance

Address
- 52 Rocket Place Lowellville, Ohio, 44436; United States
- Coordinates: 41°02′41″N 80°33′11″W

District information
- Type: Public
- Grades: K–12
- Established: 1920
- Superintendent: Christine Sawicki
- Accreditation: Ohio Department of Education
- NCES District ID: 3904833

Students and staff
- Enrollment: 454 (2024–25)
- Staff: 34.40 (FTE)
- Student–teacher ratio: 13.20
- District mascot: Rockets
- Colors: Navy Blue and Gold

Other information
- Website: https://www.lowellville.k12.oh.us/

The Lowellville Local School District is a school district located in southwestern Mahoning County, Ohio. It serves students K-12 living in Lowellville, Ohio and parts of Coitsville and Poland townships. The district consists of one high school, and one elementary school. All buildings and offices are located in Lowellville, Ohio.

== History ==
The Lowellville Local School District was formed in 1920, with the consolidations of smaller local schools within the area. Lowellville is noted as having one of Ohio's oldest high schools, with its first campus being built in 1876. Other buildings were later built in 1904, another 1925, which was occupied until 1951 when its current location at 52 Rocket Place was built soon after. Its previous campus was demolished in 2003.

== Schools ==
=== High school ===
- Lowellville High School

=== Elementary school ===
- Lowellville Elementary School

=== Former schools ===
- Southside School
