= Heartland Christian School =

Location
- 28 Pittsburgh Street; Columbiana, Ohio 44408; United States; 40°53′10″N 80°41′33″W

Information
- Type: Private, Coeducational
- Religious affiliation: Non-Denominational Christian
- Established: 1996
- President: Jason Norbo
- Teaching staff: 27.5
- Grades: Pre-K–12
- Enrollment: 454 (2023-2024)
- Colors: Black and Purple
- Athletics conference: Ohio High School Athletic Association
- Team name: Lions
- Accreditation: Association of Christian Schools International
- Website: http://www.heartlandschool.org

Heartland Christian School is a private, Pre-K–12 Christian school in Columbiana, Ohio. Athletic teams are known as Lions and compete in the Ohio High School Athletic Association.

== History ==
The school was founded by Rev. Cecil Jones, the pastor of the Columbiana Church of the Nazarene. Heartland was located in the Church of the Nazarene on Elm Street for four years as it grew from its original enrollment of 147 students to about 180 students.

In July 2000, Heartland purchased the former Columbiana High School, and performed renovations on the school and gymnasium in 2001.

== Academics ==
The curriculum of grades 6–12, in addition to the standard mathematics, science, English, and social studies requirements, include a Bible class once a day and weekly chapel service, Advanced Placement courses in calculus AB and English language, foreign language, and ACT preparation. The secondary school offers a dual enrollment program where high school students take courses at Kent State University at Salem to earn college credits while they remain enrolled at the high school.

== Athletics ==
Heartland Christian High School currently offers:

- Basketball
- Baseball
- Bowling
- Cross Country
- Golf
- Track and field
- Volleyball
- Soccer
- Tennis
- Softball
