= Crestview Local School District (Columbiana County) =

School district in Ohio

Coordinates: 40.8425°N 80.6682°W

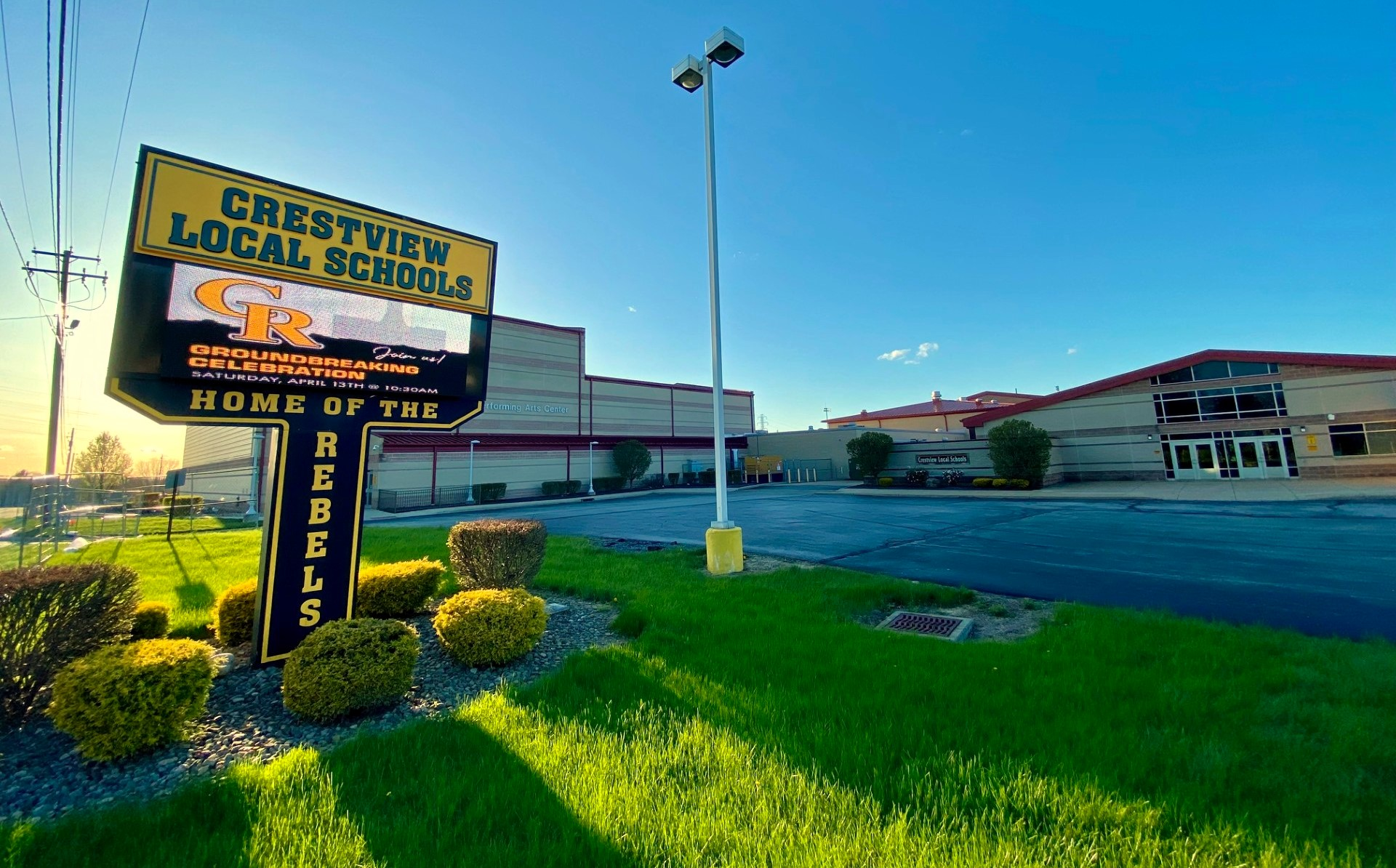

Address
- 44100 Crestview Road Columbiana, Ohio, 44408; United States

District information
- Type: Public
- Grades: K-12
- Superintendent: Dan Hill
- NCES District ID: 3904643

Students and staff
- Students: 1,136 (2024-25)
- Teachers: 78.11
- Student–teacher ratio: 14.54
- District mascot: Rebels
- Colors: Yellow & Black

Other information
- Website: www.crestviewlocal.k12.oh.us

The Crestview Local School District is a public school district located northeastern Columbiana County, Ohio, United States. The district serves students in grades K-12 living in Columbiana, New Waterford, Fairfield, and portions of Center and Unity townships. It serves one high school, middle school and elementary school. All schools and offices are located in Columbiana.

== History ==
The Crestview Local School District formed in the early 1960s, with Crestview High School opening in 1961. A centralized elementary and middle school was opened between the 1970s into the 1990s.

In 2022, Crestview received $63 million total from the Ohio Facilities Construction Commission and local funding to build a new K-12 campus.

== Schools ==
=== High school ===
- Crestview High School

=== Middle school ===
- Crestview Middle School

=== Elementary school ===
- Crestview Elementary School
