= McDonald Local School District =

Location
- 600 Iowa Avenue; McDonald, Ohio 44437; United States
- Coordinates: 41°09′40″N 80°43′41″W

Information
- Type: Public
- NCES District ID: 3905022
- Superintendent: Gary Carkido
- Teaching staff: 21.00 (on an FTE basis)
- Grades: K-12
- Enrollment: 721 (2024-25)
- Student to teacher ratio: 14.95
- Colors: Blue and White
- Nickname: Blue Devils
- Website: www.mcdonald.k12.oh.us/mcdonaldhighschool_home.aspx

The McDonald Local School District is a school district located in McDonald, Ohio, United States. The school district serves one high school, and one elementary school.

== History ==
McDonald Local School District formed in the early 1900s, with the construction of Roosevelt School in 1917 and McDonald High School in 1929. McDonald High School is one of Trumbull Counties longest tenured high schools, with only minor renovations being done to the school since its opening.

Roosevelt School, one of McDonalds oldest schools, was demolished in November 2003. Since then, McDonald High School has housed students in grades 7-12, while Roosevelt Elementary housed students grades K-6.

== Schools ==
Schools within the district consists of

=== High School ===
- McDonald High School

=== Elementary School ===
- Roosevelt Elementary School

=== Former School ===
- Roosevelt School
