= New Waterford =

New Waterford may refer to:

- New Waterford, Nova Scotia
- New Waterford, Ohio
- New Waterford Girl
