= Jones–Bowman House =

Historic house in Ohio, United States

- U.S. National Register of Historic Places
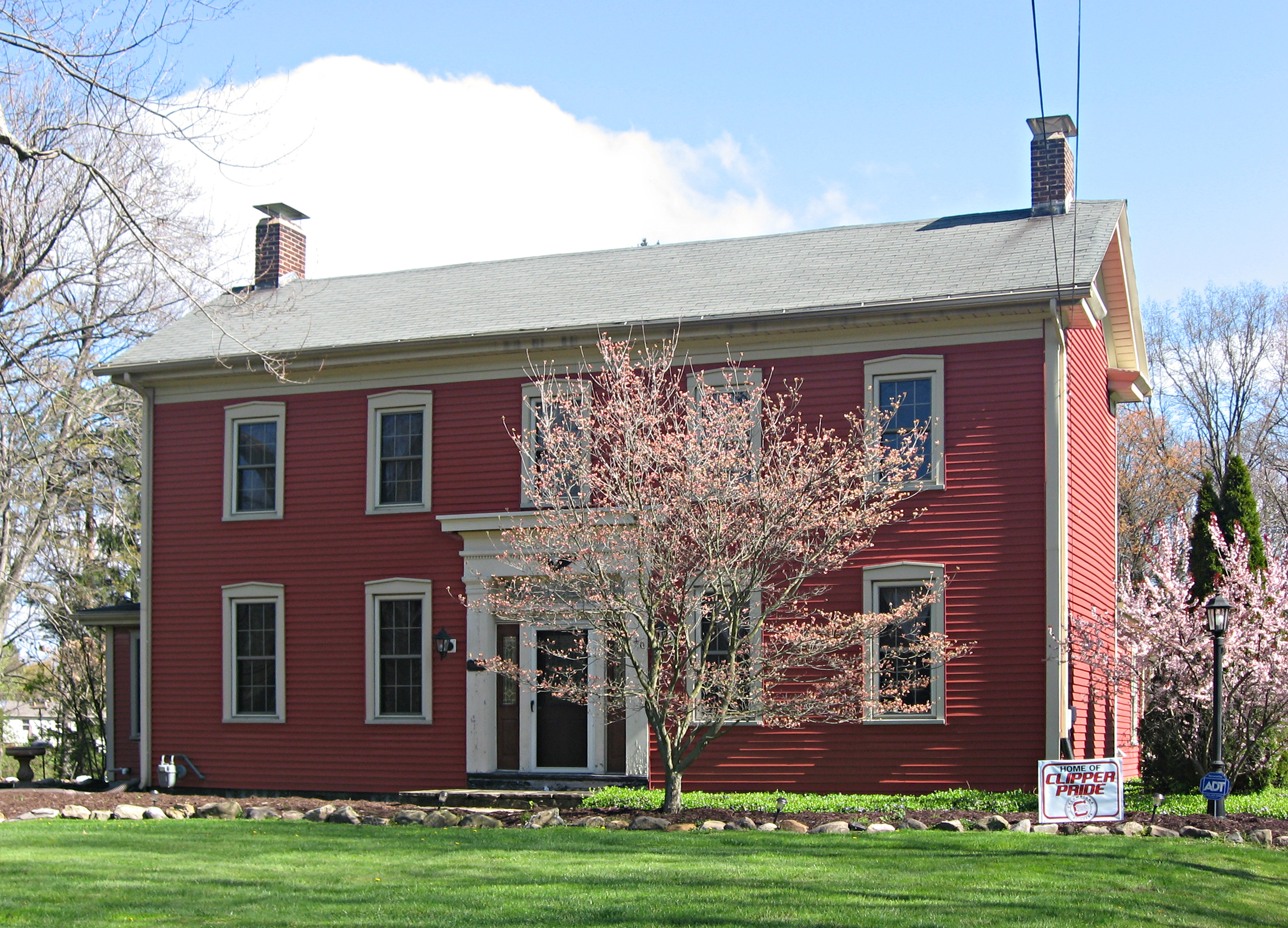
- Jones–Bowman House

- Location within Ohio Location within the United States
- Location: 540 Pittsburgh St., Columbiana, Ohio
- Coordinates: 40°52′56″N 80°41′8″W
- Area: 1 acre (0.40 ha)
- Built: 1842
- Built by: J. Jones
- NRHP reference No.: 76001383
- Added to NRHP: December 12, 1976

The Jones–Bowman House was built in 1842 in Columbiana, Ohio. The house was built by J. Jones who was the son of an abolitionist. It is believed that the house was part of the Underground Railroad.

The house has remained preserved as it was built. It is a two-story home in an "L" shape. A spiral staircase and four wood-burning fireplaces have not been altered since the house was built.

The house was purchased by E. Bowman in 1885. It was listed on the National Register of Historic Places in December 1976.
