= Washingtonville, Ohio =

- Village
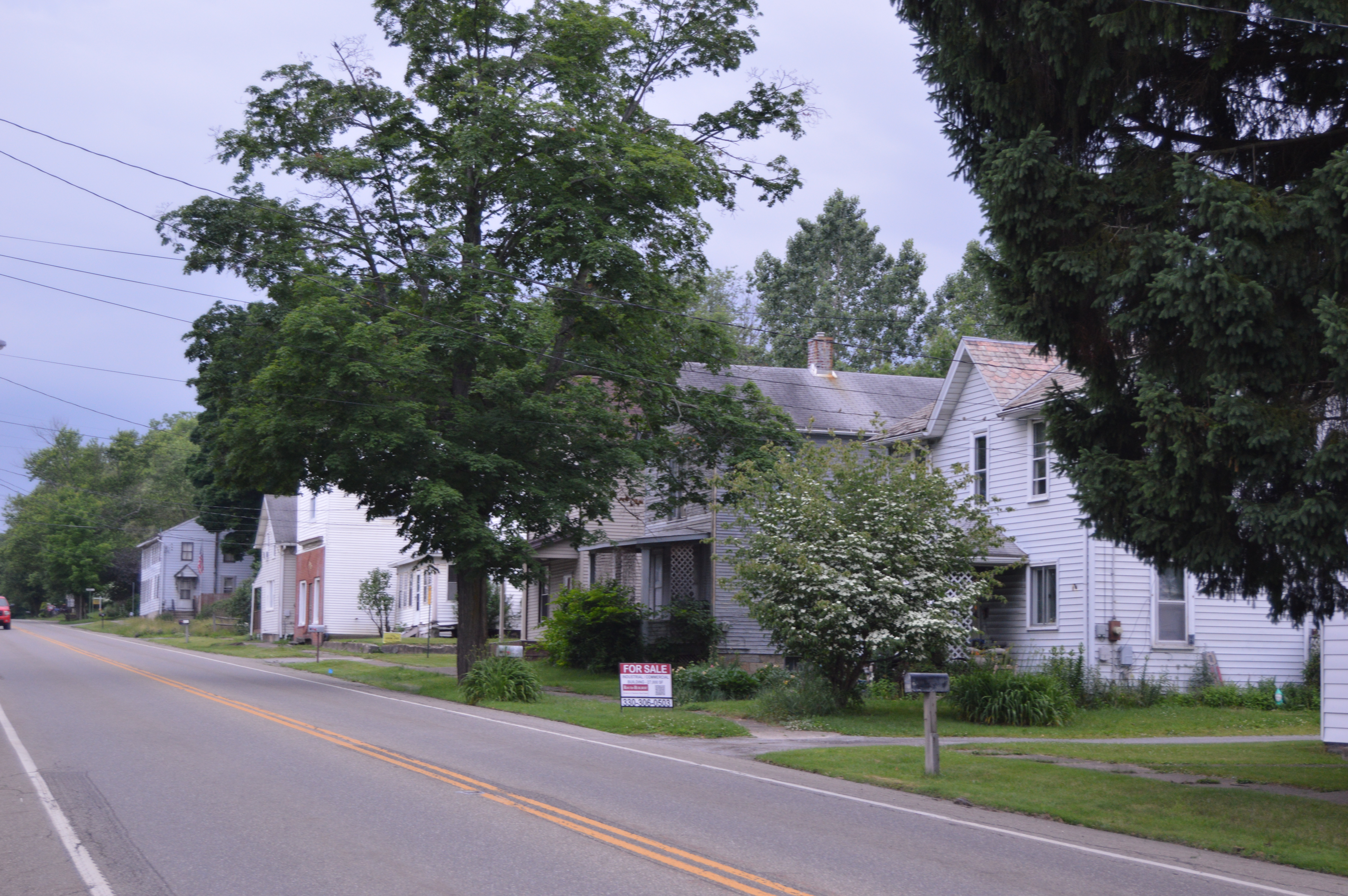
- Houses on Market Street
- Interactive map of Washingtonville, Ohio
- Location within Ohio Location within the United States
- Coordinates: 40°53′56″N 80°46′04″W
- Country: United States
- State: Ohio
- Counties: Columbiana, Mahoning

Government
  - Type: Mayor-Council
  - Mayor: Ronald D. Stevens

Area
  - Total: 0.67 sq mi (1.73 km^{2})
  - Land: 0.67 sq mi (1.73 km^{2})
  - Water: 0 sq mi (0.00 km^{2})
- Elevation: 1,083 ft (330 m)

Population (2020)
  - Total: 712
  - Density: 1,065.2/sq mi (411.27/km^{2})
- Time zone: UTC-5 (Eastern (EST))
  - Summer (DST): UTC-4 (EDT)
- ZIP code: 44490
- Area codes: 234/330
- FIPS code: 39-81732
- GNIS feature ID: 2400100
- School District: Leetonia Exempted Village School District
- Website: villageofwashingtonville.com

Washingtonville is a village in Columbiana and Mahoning counties in the U.S. state of Ohio. The population was 712 at the 2020 census. It is part of the Youngstown–Warren metropolitan area.

== History ==
Washingtonville was laid out in 1832, and the first hotel was built there in 1833. Washingtonville was incorporated in 1844.

== Geography ==
According to the United States Census Bureau, the village has a total area of 0.67 square miles (1.74 km^{2}), all land.

== Demographics ==
Historical population
Census	Pop.	Note	%±
1880	958		—
1900	1,092		—
1910	957		−12.4%
1920	823		−14.0%
1930	816		−0.9%
1940	836		2.5%
1950	848		1.4%
1960	810		−4.5%
1970	747		−7.8%
1980	865		15.8%
1990	894		3.4%
2000	789		−11.7%
2010	801		1.5%
2020	712		−11.1%
U.S. Decennial Census

=== 2010 census ===
As of the census of 2010, there were 801 people, 323 households, and 225 families living in the village. The population density was 1,195.5 inhabitants per square mile (461.6/km^{2}). There were 358 housing units at an average density of 534.3 per square mile (206.3/km^{2}). The racial makeup of the village was 98.0% White, 0.9% African American, 0.1% from other races, and 1.0% from two or more races. Hispanic or Latino of any race were 0.5% of the population.

There were 323 households, of which 32.2% had children under the age of 18 living with them, 43.0% were married couples living together, 19.5% had a female householder with no husband present, 7.1% had a male householder with no wife present, and 30.3% were non-families. 24.5% of all households were made up of individuals, and 10.2% had someone living alone who was 65 years of age or older. The average household size was 2.48 and the average family size was 2.92.

The median age in the village was 37.5 years. 24.7% of residents were under the age of 18; 9.3% were between the ages of 18 and 24; 24.3% were from 25 to 44; 27.9% were from 45 to 64; and 13.7% were 65 years of age or older. The gender makeup of the village was 48.7% male and 51.3% female.

=== 2000 census ===
As of the census of 2000, there were 789 people, 314 households, and 227 families living in the village. The population density was 1,179.6 inhabitants per square mile (455.4/km^{2}). There were 327 housing units at an average density of 488.9 per square mile (188.8/km^{2}). The racial makeup of the village was 98.23% White, 0.13% African American, 0.25% Native American, 0.38% from other races, and 1.01% from two or more races. Hispanic or Latino of any race were 0.63% of the population.

There were 314 households, out of which 35.4% had children under the age of 18 living with them, 48.4% were married couples living together, 17.8% had a female householder with no husband present, and 27.4% were non-families. 22.9% of all households were made up of individuals, and 7.6% had someone living alone who was 65 years of age or older. The average household size was 2.51 and the average family size was 2.91.

In the village, the population was spread out, with 26.0% under the age of 18, 10.4% from 18 to 24, 25.9% from 25 to 44, 25.1% from 45 to 64, and 12.7% who were 65 years of age or older. The median age was 38 years. For every 100 females there were 93.9 males. For every 100 females age 18 and over, there were 88.4 males.

The median income for a household in the village was $29,219, and the median income for a family was $29,167. Males had a median income of $30,625 versus $20,982 for females. The per capita income for the village was $13,061. About 20.4% of families and 19.9% of the population were below the poverty line, including 36.5% of those under age 18 and 5.7% of those age 65 or over.

== Government ==
Washingtonville operates under a mayor–council government, where there are six council members elected as a legislature in addition to an independently elected mayor who serves as an executive. The current mayor is Ronald D. Stevens.

== Education ==
Children in Washingtonville are served by the public Leetonia Exempted Village School District, which includes one elementary school and Leetonia High School.
