= Lowellville High School =

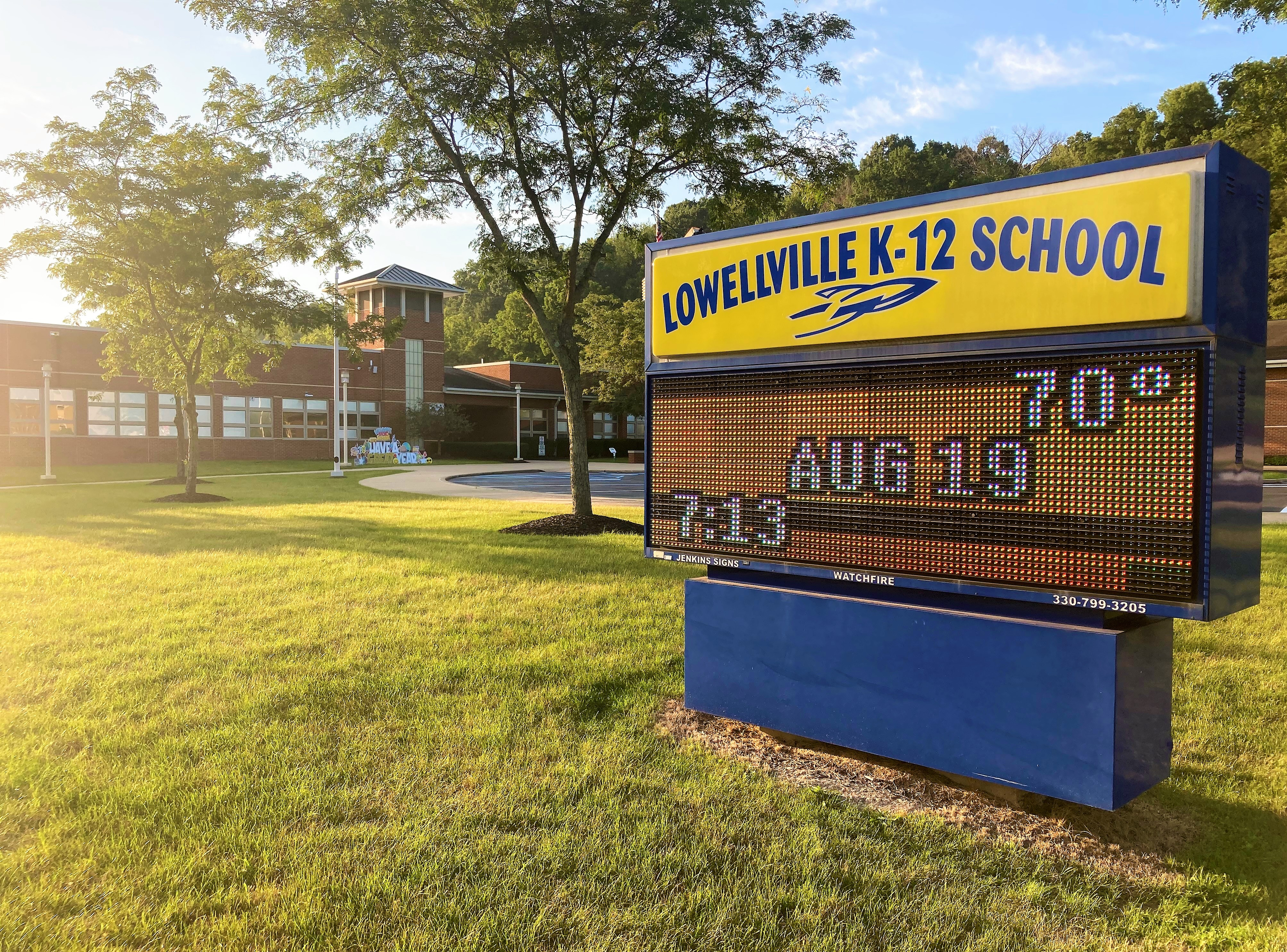

Location
- 52 Rocket Place; Lowellville, Ohio 44436; United States
- Coordinates: 41°02′41″N 80°33′11″W

Information
- Type: Public high school
- Established: 1876
- School district: Lowellville Local School District
- Superintendent: Christine Sawicki
- NCES School ID: 390483303211
- Principal: Tracie Parry
- Grades: 7–12
- Enrollment: 200 (2023-2024)
- Colors: Navy Blue and Gold
- Athletics conference: Mahoning Valley Athletic Conference
- Nickname: Rockets
- Website: www.lowellville.k12.oh.us

Lowellville Junior/Senior High School is a public high school in Lowellville, Ohio. It is the only high school in the Lowellville Local School District. Their nickname is the Rockets, and they compete in the Ohio High School Athletic Association as a member of the Mahoning Valley Athletic Conference.

== History ==
Opened in 1876, Lowellville High School serves students grades 9–12

Lowellville is noted as one of Ohio's oldest high schools, with its first campus being built in 1876. Other buildings were later built in 1904, another 1925, which was occupied until 1951 when its current location at 52 Rocket Place was built soon after. Its previous campus was demolished in 2003.

== Athletics ==
Lowellville High School currently offers:

- Baseball
- Basketball
- Bowling
- Cheerleading
- Cross Country
- Golf
- Football
- Softball
- Track and field
- Volleyball

== Notable alumni ==
- Jennifer Walcott, glamour model and actress
- Kelly Pavlik, former professional boxer
