= Cherry Valley Coke Ovens =

- U.S. National Register of Historic Places
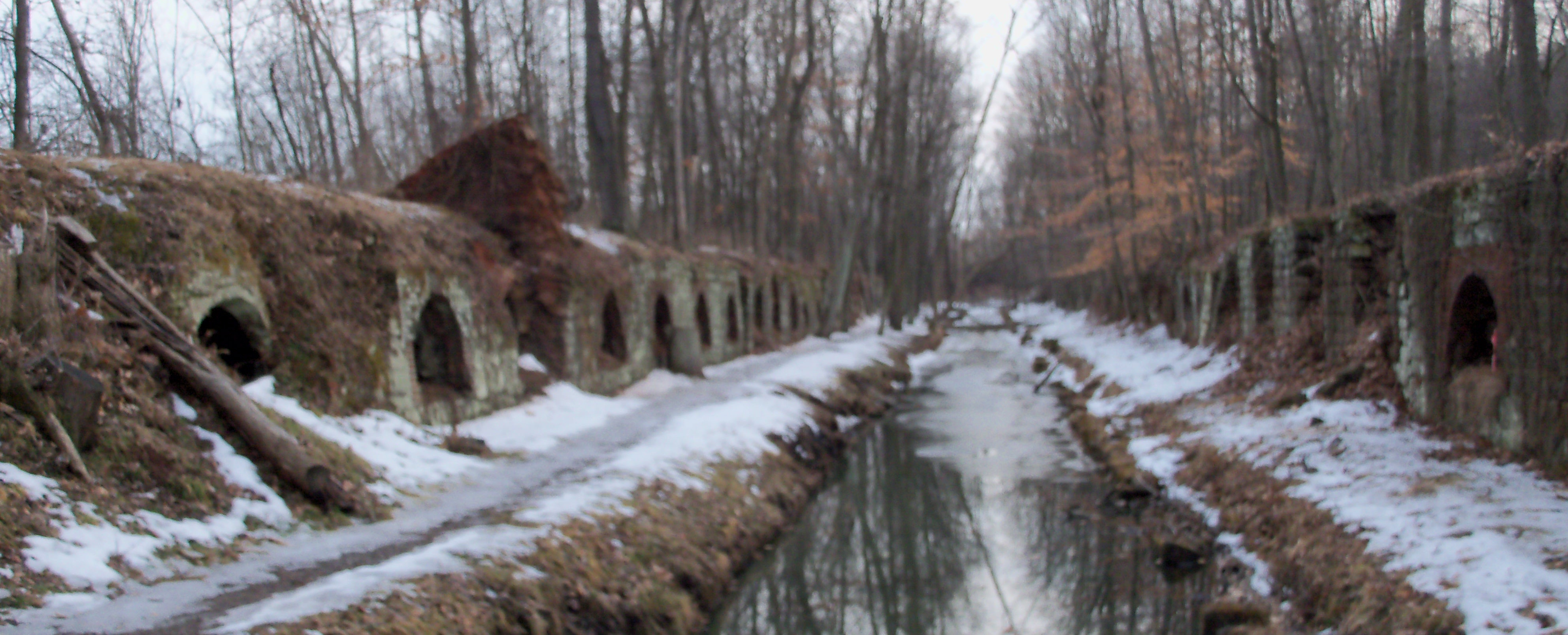

- Location within Ohio Location within the United States
- Location: Jct. of Cherry Valley and Butcher Rds., Leetonia, Ohio
- Coordinates: 40°53′13″N 80°45′59.0004″W
- Area: 10.5 acres (4.2 ha)
- Built: 1866
- Built by: Leetonia Iron & Coal Co.; Cherry Valley Iron & Coal Co.
- NRHP reference No.: 93000404
- Added to NRHP: May 6, 1993

The Cherry Valley Coke Ovens consisted of 200 coke ovens built by the Leetonia Iron and Coal Company around 1866, near Leetonia, Ohio, United States. The function of the "beehive" coke ovens was to purify coal and turn it into coke. The coke was burned in furnaces that produced iron and steel.

The site, also known as Cherry Valley Coke Ovens Arboretum, was placed on the National Register of Historic Places in 1993. An Ohio Historical Marker was added in 1999. Outside of the Connellsville Coke District in Pennsylvania, this site represents one of the largest remaining site of intact beehive coke ovens in North America.

== History ==
In the early 1860s, Irish businessman William Lee discovered rich deposits of coal, ore and lime under the soil of today's Leetonia. Lee began to buy the surrounding land and established the company "The Leetonia Coal & Iron Company" which consisted of a coal mine, coke ovens, and a blast furnace. This company jumped into the iron and coal industry and soon turned the area into a thriving company town. The area went from housing three families in 1864 to 1,800 people by 1869 when it was incorporated.

The coke production was the main operation of the company. Leetonia Coal & Iron would mine the surrounding areas for coal and then cart coal by the tons into the coke ovens on rails above the ovens. The workers would then shovel the coal into the coke ovens to cook. This would purify the coal into a purer product of coal called coke which was then shipped off to the iron mills to be used in smelting iron. Coke has a much higher temperature point than regular coal so it was preferred for use in the mills.

Each coke oven is about 12 feet in diameter and 6 to 7 feet in height with the capacity to hold two to three tons of coal each. While still using 100 ovens, Leetonia Coal & Iron would process 250 tons of coal into coke per day. However, in 1873, the company was bought out and renamed "The Cherry Valley Iron and Coal Company", who expanded operations and eventually had over 200 coke ovens and 4 blast furnaces; processing much more coal than ever before. Financial troubles hit the company during the Great Depression and the ovens were closed permanently.

The site was donated to the village of Leetonia for a park in 1982, and, in 1986, the village council appointed a commission to transform the area into a park.

== Restoration and park ==
The village of Leetonia developed the Cherry Valley Coke Ovens Park on the site. The area is heavily wooded area with hiking trails in and around the coke ovens and other sites of the former Cherry Valley Iron & Coal Co. The project was undertaken by the village of Leetonia to protect the site of a large part of the village's history.

== See also ==
- List of ovens
