= New Waterford, Ohio =

- Village
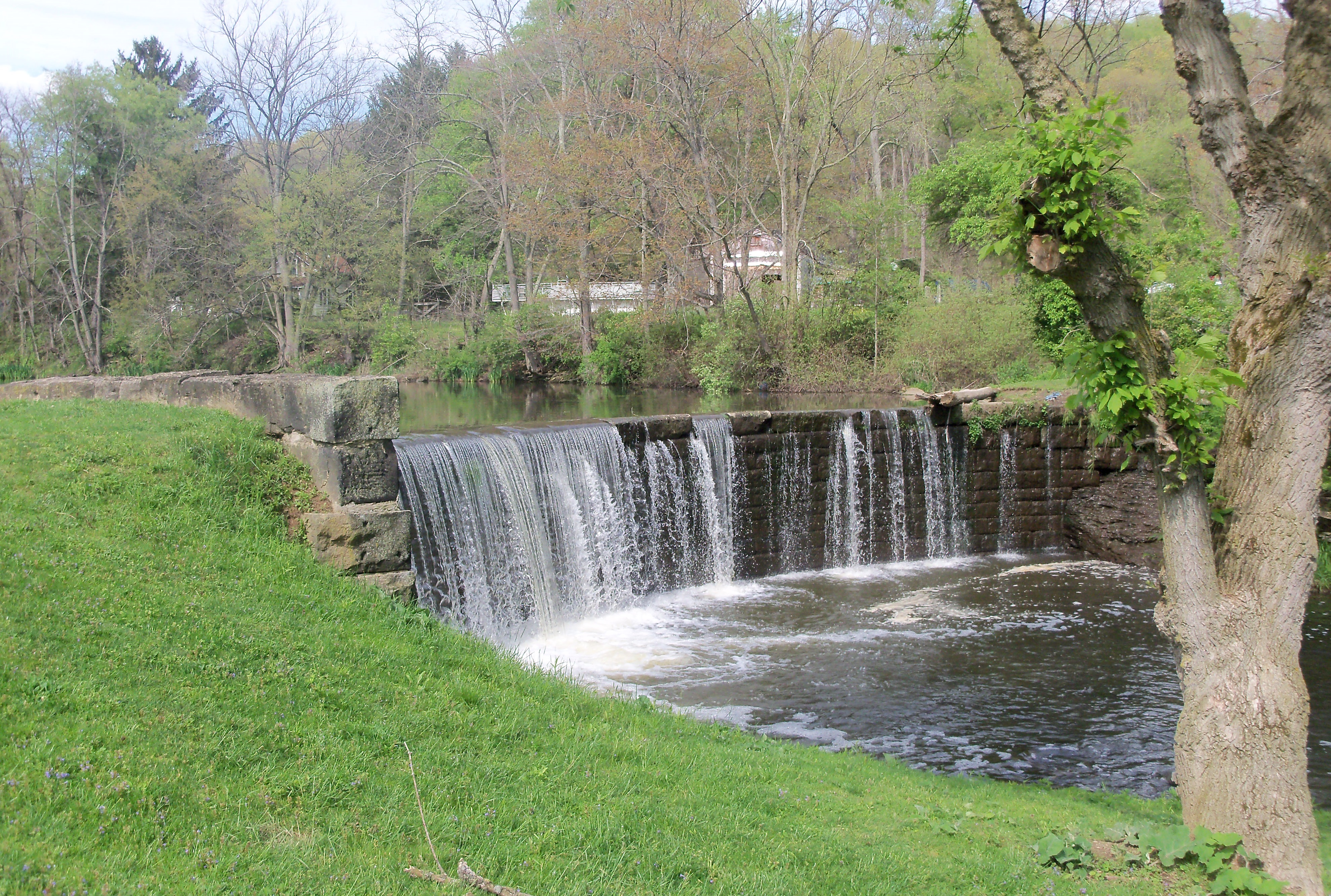
- A dam across Bull Creek in the village park
- Interactive map of New Waterford, Ohio
- Location within Ohio Location within the United States
- Coordinates: 40°51′00″N 80°37′22″W
- Country: United States
- State: Ohio
- County: Columbiana
- Founded: 1851
- Named for: Waterford, Ireland

Government
  - Type: Mayor–council
  - Mayor: M. Shane Patrone

Area
  - Total: 0.91 sq mi (2.35 km^{2})
  - Land: 0.91 sq mi (2.35 km^{2})
  - Water: 0 sq mi (0.00 km^{2})
- Elevation: 1,070 ft (330 m)

Population (2020)
  - Total: 1,194
  - Density: 1,318.5/sq mi (509.06/km^{2})
- Time zone: UTC-5 (Eastern (EST))
  - Summer (DST): UTC-4 (EDT)
- ZIP code: 44445
- Area codes: 330, 234
- FIPS code: 39-55790
- GNIS feature ID: 2399486
- School District: Crestview Local School District
- Website: https://newwaterford-oh.gov/

New Waterford is a village in Columbiana County, Ohio, United States. The population was 1,194 at the 2020 census.

== History ==
New Waterford was laid out in 1851 by John and Robert Silliman as Bull Creek. The village was later renamed for Waterford, Ireland. In the 19th century, New Waterford contained sawmills and gristmills powered by the Big Bull Creek. The village was incorporated in 1900.

== Geography ==
According to the United States Census Bureau, the village has a total area of 0.89 square miles (2.31 km^{2}), all land. It is about 20 miles (32 km) south of Youngstown.

== Demographics ==
Historical population
Census	Pop.	Note	%±
1880	192		—
1910	509		—
1920	438		−13.9%
1930	491		12.1%
1940	547		11.4%
1950	610		11.5%
1960	711		16.6%
1970	735		3.4%
1980	1,314		78.8%
1990	1,278		−2.7%
2000	1,391		8.8%
2010	1,238		−11.0%
2020	1,194		−3.6%
U.S. Decennial Census

=== 2010 census ===
As of the census of 2010, there were 1,238 people, 513 households, and 348 families living in the village. The population density was 1,391.0 inhabitants per square mile (537.1/km^{2}). There were 558 housing units at an average density of 627.0 per square mile (242.1/km^{2}). The racial makeup of the village was 98.1% White, 0.2% African American, 0.2% Native American, 0.5% Asian, 0.1% from other races, and 0.9% from two or more races. Hispanic or Latino of any race were 0.6% of the population.

There were 513 households, of which 30.4% had children under the age of 18 living with them, 51.3% were married couples living together, 13.1% had a female householder with no husband present, 3.5% had a male householder with no wife present, and 32.2% were non-families. 29.0% of all households were made up of individuals, and 14.2% had someone living alone who was 65 years of age or older. The average household size was 2.41 and the average family size was 2.94.

The median age in the village was 40.1 years. 24% of residents were under the age of 18; 8.3% were between the ages of 18 and 24; 23.3% were from 25 to 44; 28.3% were from 45 to 64; and 16% were 65 years of age or older. The gender makeup of the village was 47.1% male and 52.9% female.

=== 2000 census ===
As of the census of 2000, there were 1,391 people, 570 households, and 388 families living in the village. The population density was 1,564.0 inhabitants per square mile (603.9/km^{2}). There were 598 housing units at an average density of 672.4 per square mile (259.6/km^{2}). The racial makeup of the village was 98.78% White, 0.07% African American, 0.07% from other races, and 1.08% from two or more races. Hispanic or Latino of any race were 0.14% of the population.

There were 570 households, out of which 32.6% had children under the age of 18 living with them, 51.2% were married couples living together, 13.0% had a female householder with no husband present, and 31.8% were non-families. 28.6% of all households were made up of individuals, and 14.9% had someone living alone who was 65 years of age or older. The average household size was 2.44 and the average family size was 3.01.

In the village, the population was spread out, with 25.4% under the age of 18, 7.9% from 18 to 24, 27.9% from 25 to 44, 24.9% from 45 to 64, and 13.9% who were 65 years of age or older. The median age was 38 years. For every 100 females there were 92.7 males. For every 100 females age 18 and over, there were 85.5 males.

The median income for a household in the village was $35,000, and the median income for a family was $44,313. Males had a median income of $29,931 versus $17,813 for females. The per capita income for the village was $16,239. About 6.8% of families and 9.5% of the population were below the poverty line, including 11.3% of those under age 18 and 10.8% of those age 65 or over.

== Government ==
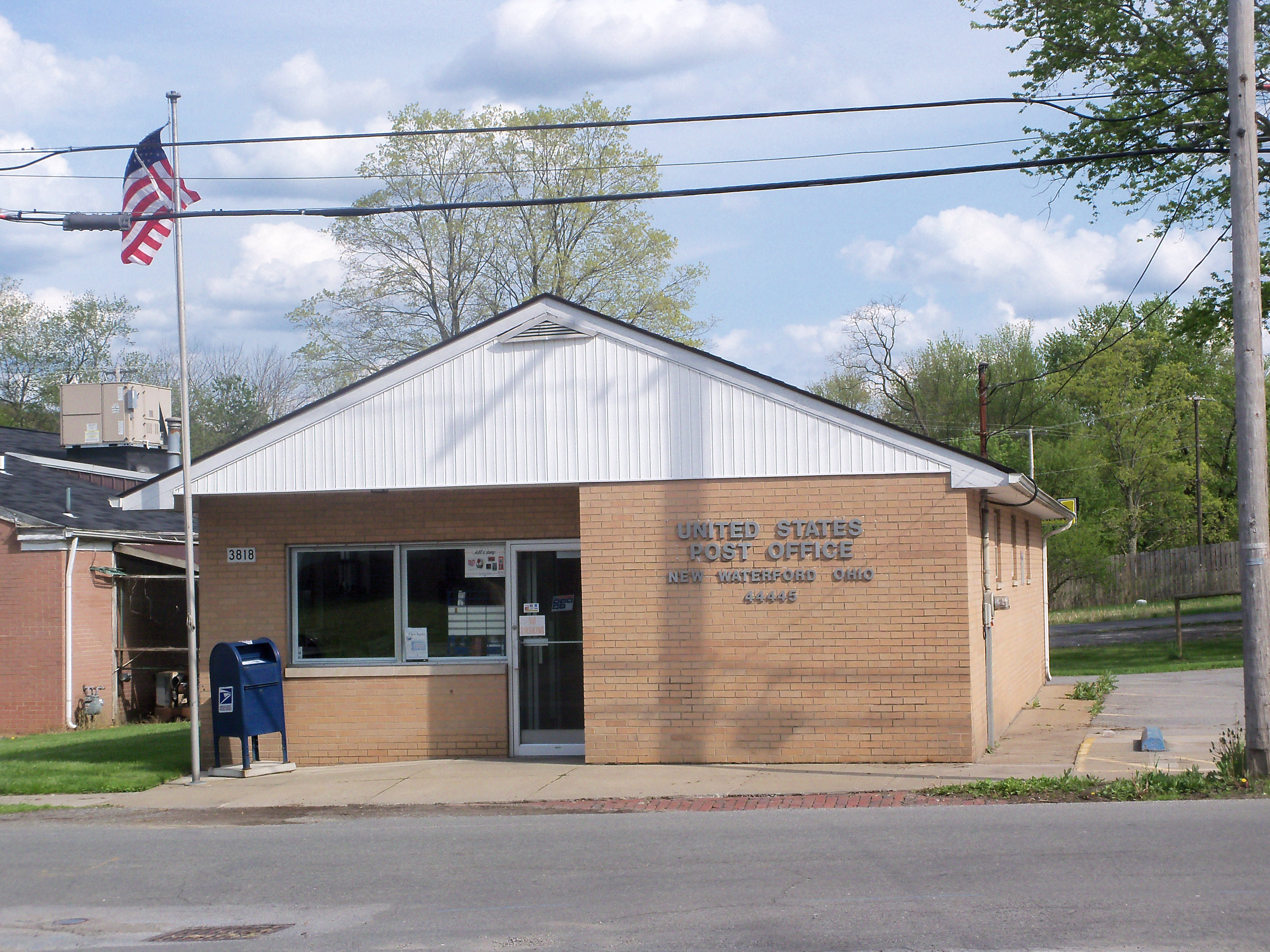
New Waterford post office

New Waterford operates under a mayor–council government, where there are six council members elected as a legislature in addition to an independently elected mayor who serves as an executive. As of 2021, the mayor is M. Shane Patrone.

== Education ==
Children in New Waterford are served by the Crestview Local School District, which includes one elementary school, one middle school, and Crestview High School.

== Transportation ==
State Route 46 runs north–south through the village.
