= Firestone Farms =

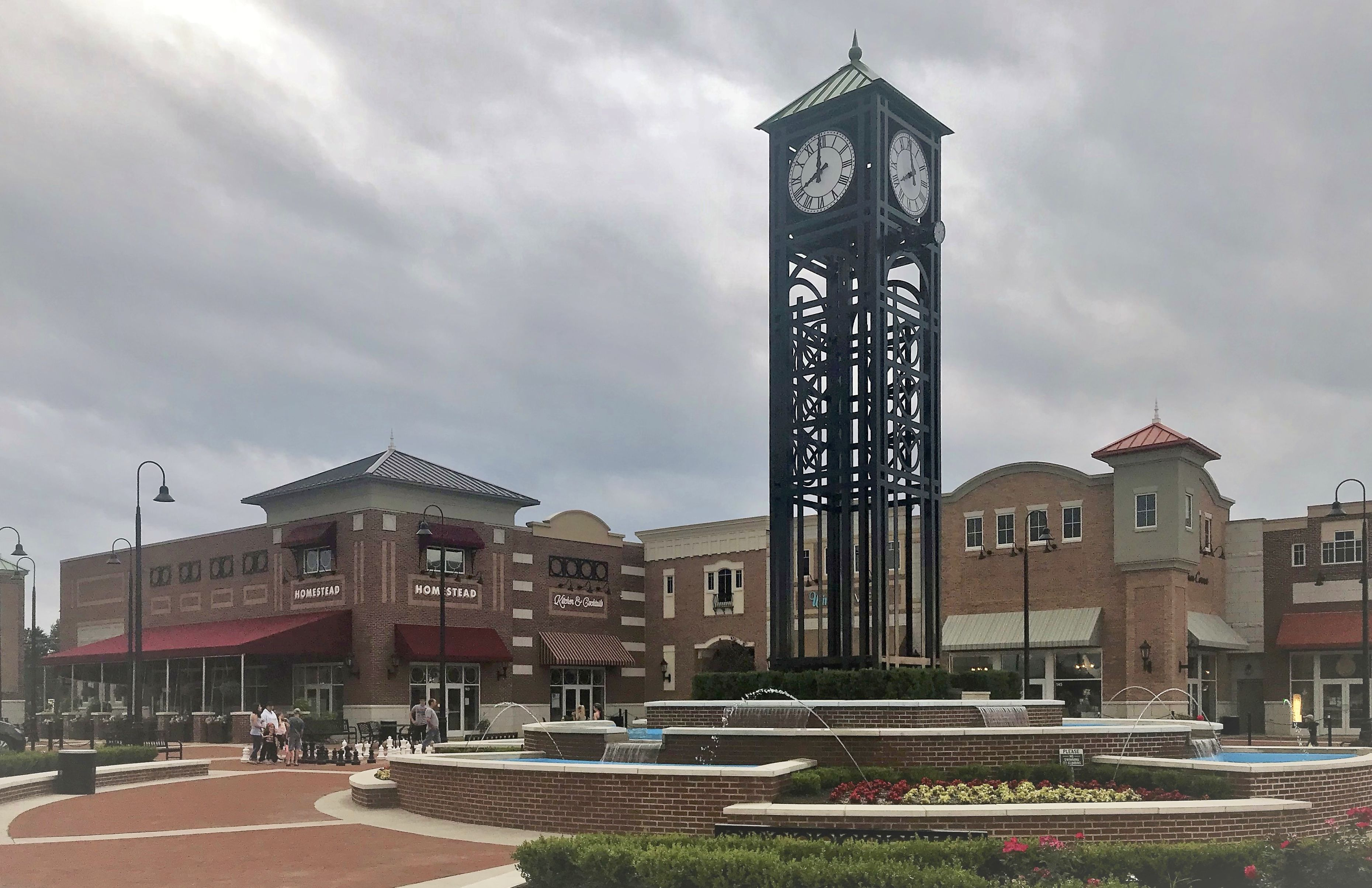
- TownCentre at Firestone Farms
- Location: Columbiana, Ohio, United States
- Coordinates: 40°53′9.6″N 80°38′56.9″W
- Opened: 2016
- Developer: Baker Bednar Snyder & Associates
- Owner: Tom Mackall
- Num. of stores: 15
- Num. of anchor tenants: 2
- Website: firestonefarms.org

Firestone Farms is a shopping center located in Columbiana, Ohio along Ohio Route 14. Opened in 2016, Firestone Farms consists of a downtown-style district, known as Town Centre, and a planned traditional-style shopping hub, known as Marketplace. Firestone Farms is designed to be a retail park-style commercial cluster.
