= Weathersfield Local School District =

School district in Ohio, United States

Address
- 1334 Seaborn Street Weathersfield Township, Ohio; United States
- Coordinates: =

District information
- Type: Public
- Grades: PK–12
- NCES District ID: 3905025

Students and staff
- Enrollment: 887 (2024–25)
- Faculty: 58.39 (on an FTE basis)
- Student–teacher ratio: 15.09

Other information
- Website: www.weathersfield.k12.oh.us

The Weathersfield Local School District is a school district located in Weathersfield Township, Ohio, United States. The school district serves one high school and one elementary school.

== History ==
The Weathersfield School District formed in the early 1900s, with the consolidation of several smaller schools.

The original Mineral Ridge High School was built in 1924 and was home to its students until 1976, when the old campus was torn down along with Joseph Seabron Jr. School in 2015. The demolition project cost the district $25.4 million, with renovations to build a new elementary school and its new high school.

== Schools ==
The schools within the district consist of:

=== High School ===
- Mineral Ridge High School

=== Elementary School ===
- Seaborn Elementary School

=== Former Schools ===
- Joseph Seaborn Jr. School
