= McDonald High School (Ohio) =

Public high school in Ohio

Location
- 600 Iowa Avenue; McDonald, Ohio 44437; United States
- 41°09′40″N 80°43′41″W

Information
- Type: Public
- Established: 1929
- School district: McDonald Local School District
- Principal: Meghan Watson
- Teaching staff: 21.00 (on an FTE basis)
- Grades: 7-12
- Enrollment: 338 (2024-2025)
- Student to teacher ratio: 16.10
- Colors: Blue and White
- Athletics conference: Mahoning Valley Athletic Conference
- Nickname: Blue Devils
- Website: www.mcdonald.k12.oh.us

McDonald High School is a public high school in McDonald, Ohio. It is the only high school in the McDonald Local School District. Their nickname is the Blue Devils, and they compete as a member of the Ohio High School Athletic Association in the Mahoning Valley Athletic Conference.

== History ==
McDonald High School was built in 1929 and has remained in its current building since its opening, making it the longest tenured high school in Trumbull County, Ohio.

For much of the high school's history, it has remained a traditional four-year high school, but after the closure and eventual demolition of Roosevelt School in the early 2000s, grades seventh and eighth were moved into the high school building, creating the present-day junior-senior high school.

== Athletics ==
=== State championships ===
- Boys cross country – 1982, 1983, 1999, 2001, 2004, 2011, 2013
- Boys track and field – 1999, 2011, 2025
- Girls cross country – 2014
- Girls track and field – 2014

=== Associated Press poll winners ===
- Girls basketball – 1991

== Notable alumni ==
- Christian Smith (Crankdat) - music producer and DJ
