= Mineral Ridge High School =

School in Ohio, United States

Coordinates: 41°08′41″N 80°46′19″W

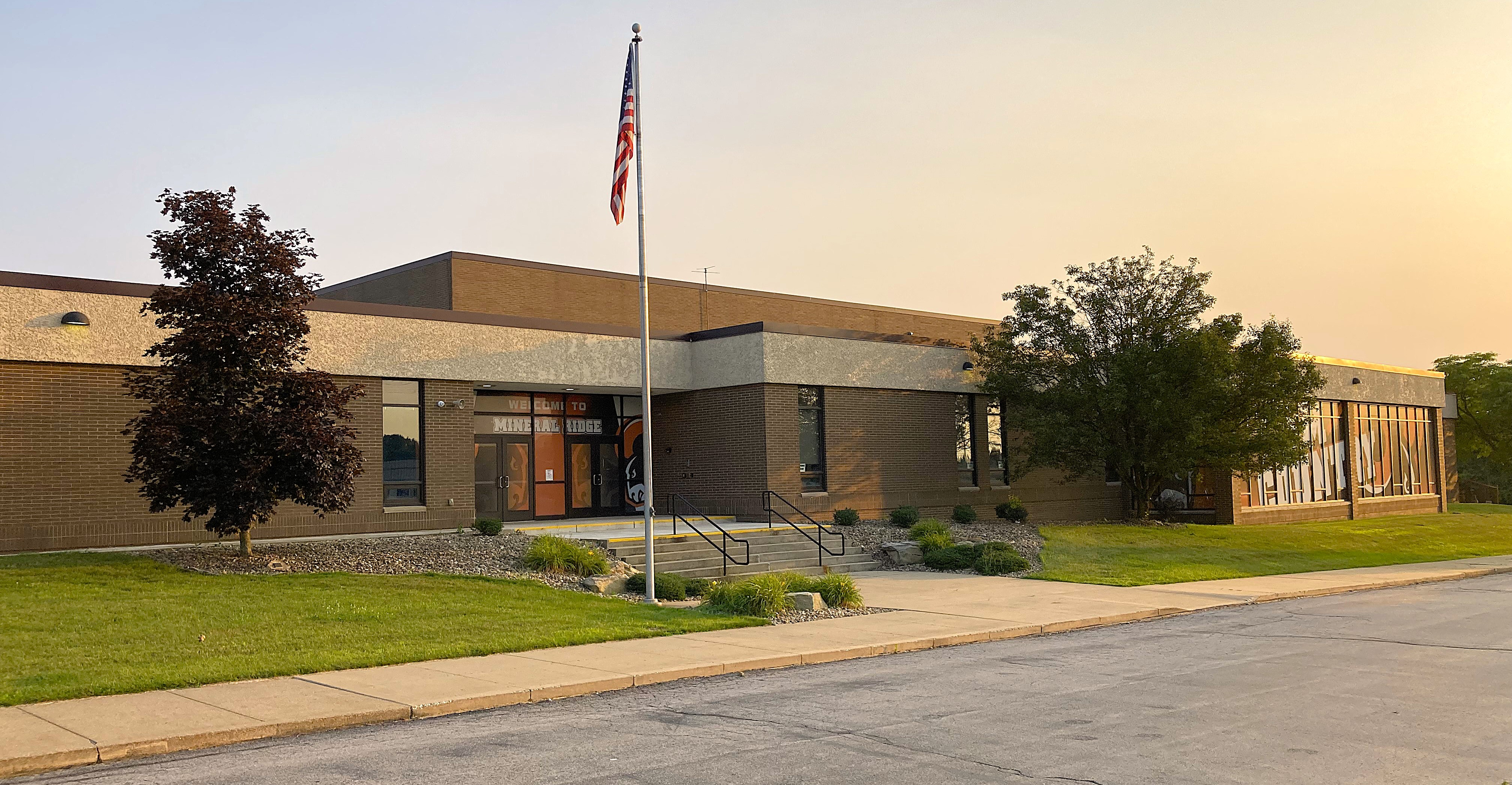

Location
- 1334 Seaborn Street; Mineral Ridge, (Trumbull County), Ohio 44440; United States

Information
- Type: Public high school
- Opened: 1873
- Superintendent: Damon Dohar
- NCES School ID: 390502503889
- Principal: Joe Stevens
- Teaching staff: 30.00 (FTE)
- Grades: 9-12
- Enrollment: 409 (2024–25)
- Student to teacher ratio: 13.63
- Colors: Orange and black
- Athletics conference: Mahoning Valley Athletic Conference
- Nickname: Rams
- Website: https://www.weathersfield.k12.oh.us/schools/high-school

Mineral Ridge High School is a public high school in Mineral Ridge, Ohio. It is the only high school in the Weathersfield Local School District. Athletic teams are known as the Rams, and they compete in the Mahoning Valley Athletic Conference as a member of the Ohio High School Athletic Association.

== History ==
Mineral Ridge High School was built in 1873 on Main Street, after the consolidation of several smaller community schools. The historic Main Street school was demolished in 2015.

With enrollment growing post-World War II, a new high school was built in 1976 on Seaborn Street, moving the junior and senior high schools into one building.

== Athletics ==
Mineral Ridge High School offers:

- Baseball
- Basketball
- Bowling
- Cheerleading
- Cross country
- Golf
- Girl's flag football
- Football
- Soccer
- Softball
- Volleyball

=== State championships ===
- Girls softball – 1985
