= Crestview High School (Columbiana, Ohio) =

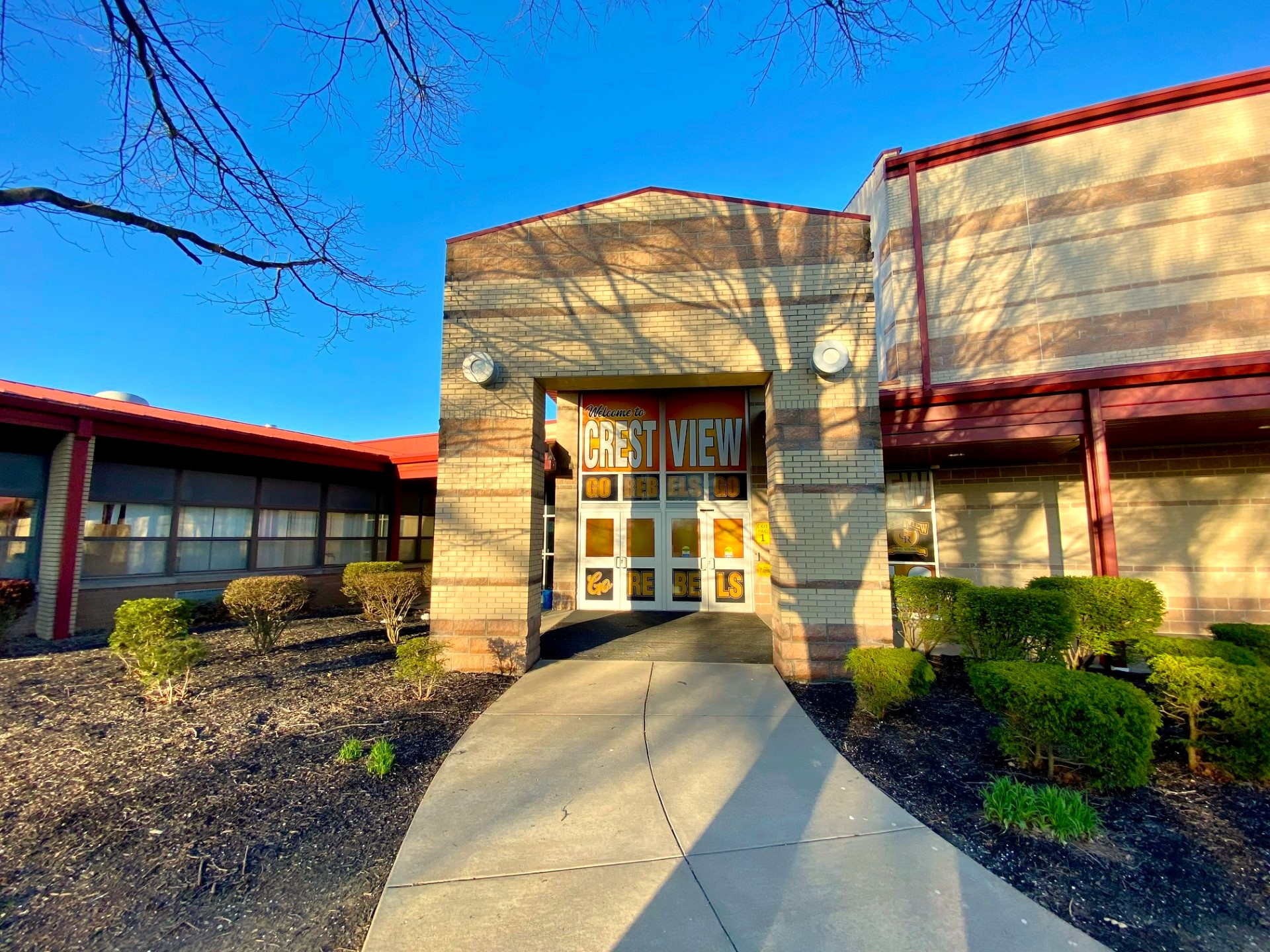

Location
- 44100 Crestview Road; Columbiana, Ohio 44408; United States; 40°50′36″N 80°40′5″W

Information
- Type: Public, Coeducational high school
- Established: 1961
- School district: Crestview Local School District
- CEEB code: 361485
- Principal: Caleb Crowl
- Grades: 9-12
- Enrollment: 340 (2023–2024)
- Campus type: Fringe Rural
- Colors: Gold and Black
- Athletics conference: Mahoning Valley Athletic Conference; Ohio Valley Athletic Conference
- Team name: Rebels
- Accreditation: North Central Association of Colleges and Schools
- Website: chs.crestviewrebels.org

Crestview High School is a public high school near Columbiana, Ohio, United States. It is the only high school in the Crestview Local School District. Athletic teams are known as the Rebels in the Ohio High School Athletic Association as a member of the Mahoning Valley Athletic Conference and Ohio Valley Athletic Conference.

== Academics ==
Crestview High School offers courses in the traditional American curriculum. Entering their third and fourth years, students can elect to attend the Columbiana County Career and Technical Center in Lisbon As well as Mahoning County Career and Technical Center as either a part-time or full-time student.

== Athletics ==
Crestview High School currently offers:

- Baseball
- Basketball
- Cross country running
- Football
- Golf
- Soccer
- Softball
- Track and field
- Volleyball
- Wrestling

== Notable alumni ==
- Monica Robb Blasdel - member of the Ohio House of Representatives
