= Western Reserve High School (Berlin Center, Ohio) =

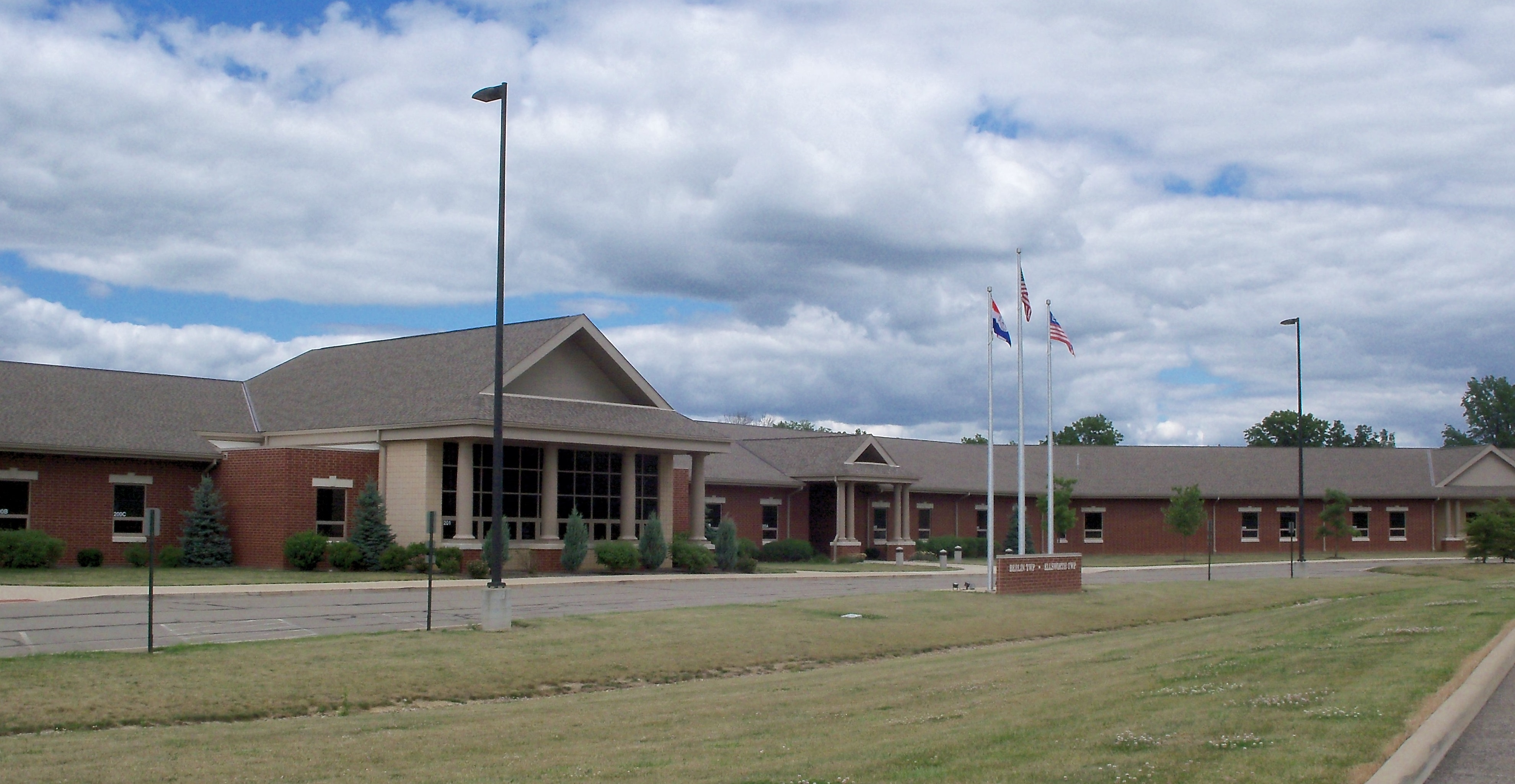

Location
- 13850 West Akron-Canfield Road; Berlin Center, Ohio 44401; United States
- Coordinates: 41°01′31.9″N 80°54′47.3″W

Information
- Type: Public high school
- Established: 1949
- School district: Western Reserve Local School District
- Superintendent: Dallas Saunders
- Principal: Micheal Gorby
- Teaching staff: 19.00 (FTE)
- Grades: 9-12
- Student to teacher ratio: 17.11
- Colors: Blue, Red, & White
- Fight song: Blue and White Fight
- Athletics conference: Mahoning Valley Athletic Conference
- Nickname: Blue Devils
- Website: www.westernreserve.k12.oh.us

Western Reserve High School is a public high school in Berlin Center, Ohio, United States. It is the only high school in the Western Reserve Local School District. Athletic teams are known as the Blue Devils and compete as a member of the Ohio High School Athletic Association in the Mahoning Valley Athletic Conference.

== History ==
Opened in 1949, Western Reserve High School serves students grades 9-12.

In 1964, a new Western Reserve High School was built and used until 2011, when the districts K-12 campus was built. The former high school was demolished in 2012.

== Athletics ==
Western Reserve High School currently offers:

- Baseball
- Basketball
- Cross country running
- Football
- Golf
- Softball
- Track & Field
- Volleyball
- Wrestling
