= Leetonia High School =

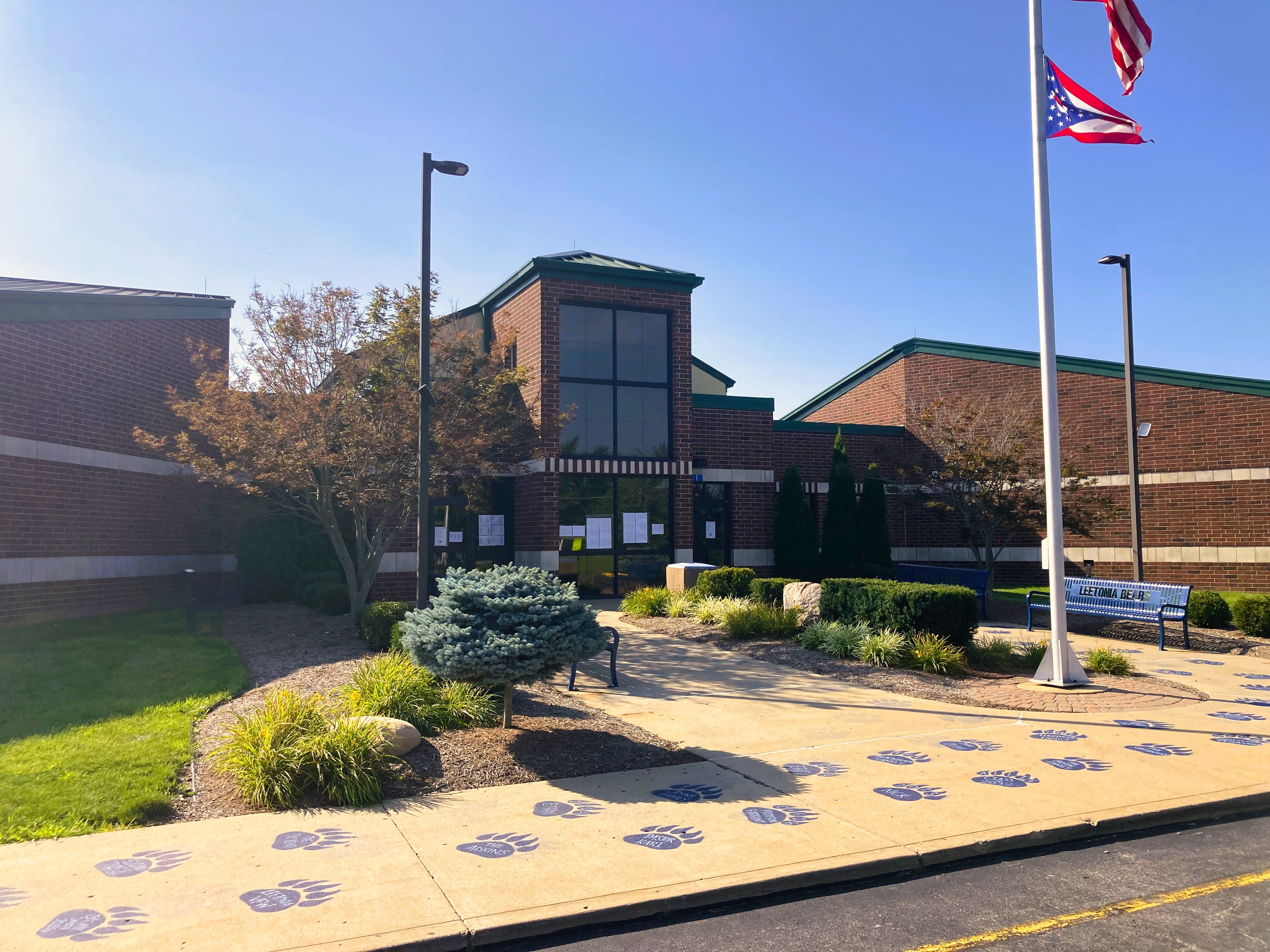

Location
- 450 Walnut Street; Leetonia, Ohio 44431; United States
- Coordinates: 40°53′20″N 80°45′58″W

Information
- Type: Public high school
- School district: Leetonia Exempted Village School District
- CEEB code: 362925
- NCES School ID: 391000702217
- Principal: Timothy Fairfield
- Teaching staff: 16.00 (FTE)
- Grades: 7–12
- Enrollment: 222 (2023–2024)
- Student to teacher ratio: 13.88
- Colors: Navy Blue and White
- Athletics conference: Northeastern Athletic Conference
- Nickname: Bears
- Yearbook: Leehiscan
- Website: www.leetonia.k12.oh.us

Leetonia High School is a public high school in Leetonia, Ohio, United States. It is the only high school in the Leetonia Exempted Village School District. Its athletic teams are known as the Bears and compete as a member of the Ohio High School Athletic Association in the Northeastern Athletic Conference.

== Academics ==
Leetonia High School offers courses in the traditional American curriculum. Entering their third and fourth years, students can elect to attend the Columbiana County Career and Technical Center in Lisbon as either a part-time or full-time student.

== Athletics ==
=== OHSAA State Championships ===
- Boys' Track and field – 1984
