= Columbiana High School =

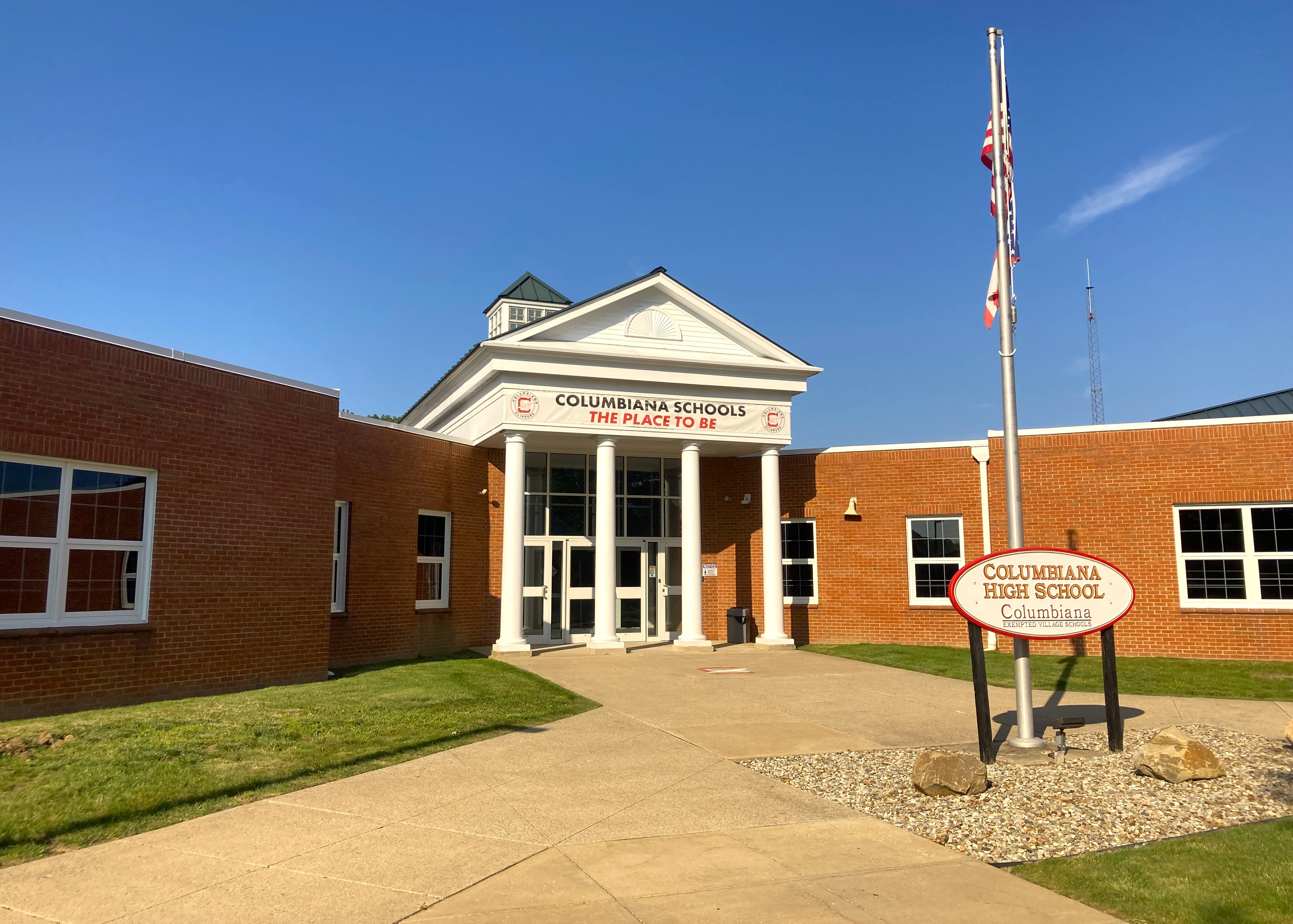

Location
- 700 Columbiana-Waterford Road; Columbiana, Ohio 44408; United States
- Coordinates: 40°52′50″N 80°40′51″W

Information
- Type: Public, coeducational high school
- Established: 1864
- School district: Columbiana Exempted Village School District
- Superintendent: Donald Mook, Ed.D.
- CEEB code: 361490
- Principal: Jeff Jackson
- Teaching staff: 20.51 (FTE)
- Grades: 9–12
- Student to teacher ratio: 14.92
- Colors: Red and white
- Athletics conference: Eastern Ohio Athletic Conference
- Team name: Clippers
- Yearbook: Clipper
- Website: www.columbiana.k12.oh.us

Columbiana High School is a public high school in Columbiana, Ohio, United States. It is the only high school in the Columbiana Exempted Village School District. Athletic teams are known as the Clippers and compete as a member of the Ohio High School Athletic Association in the Eastern Ohio Athletic Conference.

== History ==
Columbiana High School opened in 1864, in a building on Pittsburgh Street. A second building to this campus was completed in 1873 but shut down 10 years later in favor of additions. The first class graduated in 1881 with two students. A new facility was built in 1909 adjacent from the former. An addition, including an auditorium and gymnasium, was completed in 1923. In 1955, the primary school was spun off into its own building, with a junior high building following in 1962. In 1998, a new campus was built at its current location, which opened in the fall of 2000.

== Academics ==
Columbiana High School offers courses in the traditional American curriculum. Entering their third and fourth years, students can elect to attend the Columbiana County Career and Technical Center in Lisbon as either a part-time or full-time student.

== Athletics ==
=== OHSAA State Championships ===
- Boys Basketball – 1947
- Boys Track and field – 1938

== Notable alumni ==
- Harvey S. Firestone, businessman and founder of the Firestone Tire and Rubber Company
