= Columbiana, Ohio =

- City
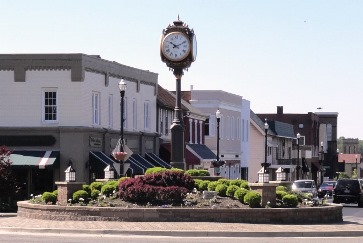
- Downtown Columbiana
- Motto: "The City with the Small-Town Heart"
- Interactive map of Columbiana, Ohio
- Location within Ohio Location within the United States
- Coordinates: 40°52′50″N 80°40′30″W
- Country: United States
- State: Ohio
- Counties: Columbiana, Mahoning
- Townships: Fairfield, Beaver, Unity
- Founded: 1805
- Named after: Christopher Columbus

Government
  - Type: Council–manager
  - Mayor: Rick Noel

Area
  - Total: 6.15 sq mi (15.94 km^{2})
  - Land: 6.08 sq mi (15.75 km^{2})
  - Water: 0.073 sq mi (0.19 km^{2})
- Elevation: 1,125 ft (343 m)

Population (2020)
  - Total: 6,559
  - Estimate (2023): 6,757
  - Density: 1,078.6/sq mi (416.45/km^{2})
- Time zone: UTC-5 (Eastern (EST))
  - Summer (DST): UTC-4 (EDT)
- ZIP code: 44408
- Area codes: 330, 234
- FIPS code: 39-17036
- GNIS feature ID: 2393608
- School District: Columbiana Exempted Village SD
- Website: www.columbianaohio.gov

Columbiana is a city in Columbiana and Mahoning counties in the U.S. state of Ohio. The population was 6,559 at the 2020 census. It is part of the Youngstown–Warren metropolitan area.

== History ==
Columbiana was laid out by Joshua Dixon and William Heald in 1805. The city takes its name from Columbiana County, which itself is named in honor of 15th-century Italian explorer Christopher Columbus, combining his surname with the mass noun suffix -iana. Columbiana was incorporated as a village in 1837 and elevated to a city in 2000.

The Jones–Bowman House, built in 1842, is believed to have been part of the Underground Railroad. Businessman Harvey S. Firestone, who founded the Firestone Tire and Rubber Company, was born and raised in Columbiana in the late 19th century. In 1933, he and his wife Idabelle Smith Firestone donated 53 acres in the city to develop Firestone Park, which opened in 1935. The Firestone Farms shopping center, housing development and golf course are named after him.

== Geography ==
Most of the city is located in Fairfield Township, Columbiana County, which in turn includes most of Columbiana's incorporated land in Columbiana County. A district of northern Columbiana lies in Beaver Township, Mahoning County, and another small portion to the east lies in Unity Township, Columbiana County.

According to the United States Census Bureau, the city has a total area of 6.14 square miles (15.90 km^{2}), of which 6.00 square miles (15.54 km^{2}) is land and 0.14 square miles (0.36 km^{2}) is water.

=== Climate ===
Climate data for Columbiana
Month	Jan	Feb	Mar	Apr	May	Jun	Jul	Aug	Sep	Oct	Nov	Dec	Year
Mean daily maximum °C (°F)	1.6 (34.9)	3.6 (38.5)	9.9 (49.8)	16.4 (61.5)	22.5 (72.5)	27.1 (80.8)	29.1 (84.4)	28.2 (82.8)	24.5 (76.1)	18.2 (64.8)	11.2 (52.2)	4.3 (39.7)	16.4 (61.5)
Mean daily minimum °C (°F)	−8.2 (17.2)	−7.4 (18.7)	−2.1 (28.2)	2.8 (37.0)	8.4 (47.1)	13.1 (55.6)	15.5 (59.9)	14.7 (58.5)	11.1 (52.0)	5.1 (41.2)	0.8 (33.4)	−4.7 (23.5)	4.1 (39.4)
Average precipitation mm (inches)	61 (2.4)	56 (2.2)	82 (3.2)	81 (3.2)	94 (3.7)	96 (3.8)	104 (4.1)	80 (3.1)	83 (3.3)	65 (2.6)	79 (3.1)	73 (2.9)	913.0 (35.94)
Average precipitation days (≥ 1.0 mm)	16	14	15	14	13	12	10	10	11	11	14	17	157
Mean monthly sunshine hours	94.7	113.3	162.7	194.7	233.7	254.8	266.3	233.7	200.4	168.6	94.5	71.0	2,088.3

== Demographics ==
Historical population
Census	Pop.	Note	%±
1860	1,174		—
1870	870		−25.9%
1880	1,223		40.6%
1890	1,112		−9.1%
1900	1,339		20.4%
1910	1,582		18.1%
1920	2,114		33.6%
1930	2,485		17.5%
1940	2,687		8.1%
1950	3,369		25.4%
1960	4,164		23.6%
1970	4,959		19.1%
1980	4,987		0.6%
1990	4,961		−0.5%
2000	5,635		13.6%
2010	6,384		13.3%
2020	6,559		2.7%
2023 (est.)	6,757		3.0%

=== 2020 census ===
As of the 2020 census, Columbiana had a population of 6,559. The median age was 52.1 years. 16.7% of residents were under the age of 18 and 32.8% of residents were 65 years of age or older. For every 100 females there were 87.5 males, and for every 100 females age 18 and over there were 84.9 males age 18 and over.

98.0% of residents lived in urban areas, while 2.0% lived in rural areas.

There were 3,113 households in Columbiana, of which 19.1% had children under the age of 18 living in them. Of all households, 43.8% were married-couple households, 18.2% were households with a male householder and no spouse or partner present, and 32.9% were households with a female householder and no spouse or partner present. About 39.3% of all households were made up of individuals and 21.9% had someone living alone who was 65 years of age or older.

There were 3,365 housing units, of which 7.5% were vacant. Among occupied housing units, 67.1% were owner-occupied and 32.9% were renter-occupied. The homeowner vacancy rate was 1.2% and the rental vacancy rate was 9.6%.

Racial composition as of the 2020 census
Race	Number	Percent
White	6,208	94.6%
Black or African American	22	0.3%
American Indian and Alaska Native	7	0.1%
Asian	43	0.7%
Native Hawaiian and Other Pacific Islander	1	<0.1%
Some other race	30	0.5%
Two or more races	248	3.8%
Hispanic or Latino (of any race)	134	2.0%

=== 2010 census ===
At the 2010 census there were 6,384 people in 2,881 households, including 1,763 families, in the city. The population density was 1,064.0 inhabitants per square mile (410.8/km^{2}). There were 3,181 housing units at an average density of 530.2 units per square mile (204.7 units/km^{2}). The racial makeup of the city was 97.7% White, 0.6% African American, 0.5% Asian, 0.4% from other races, and 0.8% from two or more races. Hispanic or Latino people of any race were 1.0%.

Of the 2,881 households 21.6% had children under the age of 18 living with them, 49.3% were married couples living together, 8.5% had a female householder with no husband present, 3.4% had a male householder with no wife present, and 38.8% were non-families. 34.5% of households were one person and 18.4% were one person aged 65 or older. The average household size was 2.15 and the average family size was 2.74.

The median age was 49.4 years. 17.5% of residents were under the age of 18; 7.6% were between the ages of 18 and 24; 19.9% were from 25 to 44; 27.7% were from 45 to 64; and 27.4% were 65 or older. The gender makeup of the city was 46.6% male and 53.4% female.

=== 2000 census ===
At the 2000 census there were 5,635 people in 2,534 households, including 1,576 families, in the city. The population density was 930.4 inhabitants per square mile (359.2/km^{2}). There were 2,707 housing units at an average density of 446.9 units per square mile (172.5 units/km^{2}). The racial makeup of the city was 98.86% White, 0.11% African American, 0.07% Native American, 0.18% Asian, 0.02% Pacific Islander, 0.07% from other races, and 0.69% from two or more races. Hispanic or Latino people of any race were 0.32%.

Of the 2,534 households 22.2% had children under the age of 18 living with them, 51.8% were married couples living together, 7.5% had a female householder with no husband present, and 37.8% were non-families. 34.9% of households were one person and 17.7% were one person aged 65 or older. The average household size was 2.15 and the average family size was 2.76.

The age distribution was 19.0% under the age of 18, 6.8% from 18 to 24, 23.5% from 25 to 44, 25.3% from 45 to 64, and 25.3% 65 or older. The median age was 46 years. For every 100 females, there were 87.3 males. For every 100 females age 18 and over, there were 82.1 males.

The median household income was $34,560 and the median family income was $42,363. Males had a median income of $33,693 versus $21,648 for females. The per capita income for the city was $19,727. About 4.9% of families and 6.5% of the population were below the poverty line, including 7.8% of those under age 18 and 6.1% of those age 65 or over.

== Economy ==
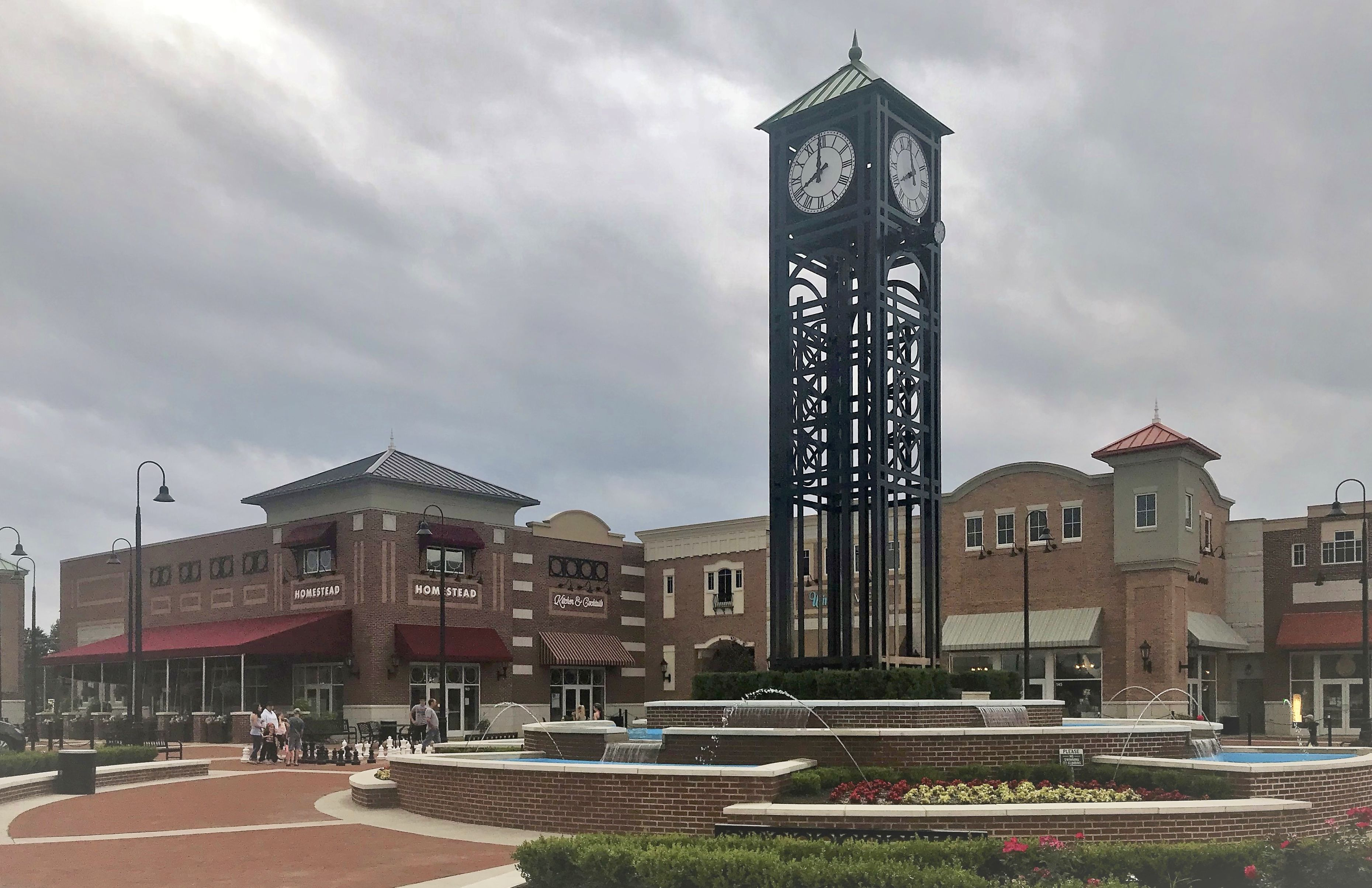
TownCenter at Firestone Farms

Columbiana is home to the 1930s-themed Firestone Farms shopping and business park.

== Arts and culture ==
The city hosts the annual Shaker Woods Arts & Crafts Festival, which brings national attention to the city in the summer and fall seasons. Other seasonal festivals include the Columbiana Wine Festival, a Fourth of July fireworks festival, the Harvey S. Firestone Festival of the Arts, American Legion Street Fair, and the Joy of Christmas Holiday Light Festival.

The city contains a public library, which was established in 1933. The initial Public Works Administration-built library opened in 1939; the library moved to a second building in 1990.

== Government ==
Columbiana operates under a chartered council–manager government, where there are six council members elected as a legislature for 4-year terms in addition to a mayor, who serves as an executive. The council employs a city manager for administration. As of 2021, the mayor is Rick Noel and the city manager is Lance Willard.

== Education ==
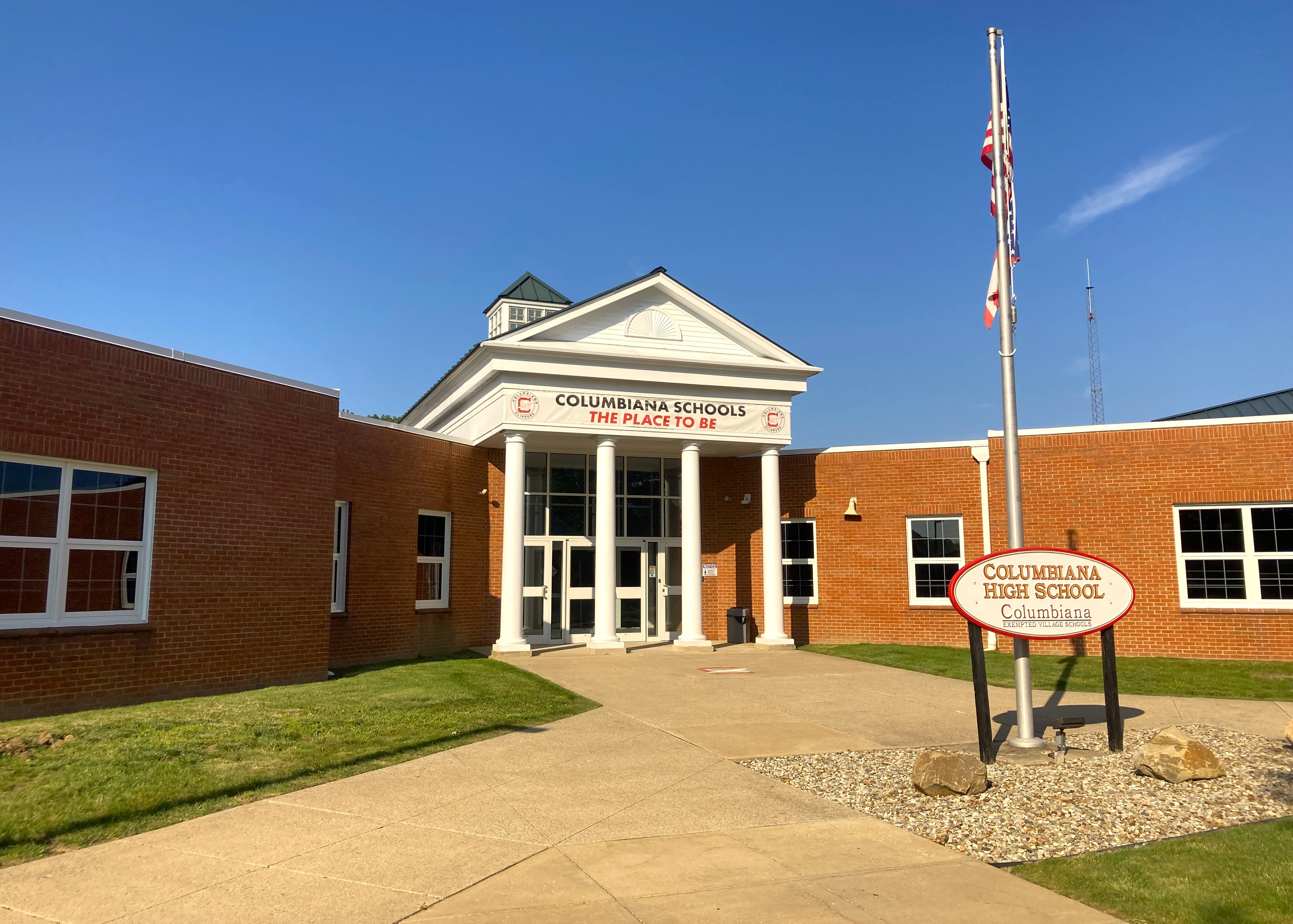
Columbiana High School

Children in Columbiana are served by the public Columbiana Exempted Village School District, which includes one elementary school, one middle school, and Columbiana High School. The city shifted from one-room schoolhouses to an organized district in 1861 and opened its first modern high school in 1864, with its first class graduating in 1881. The current high school was built in 2000. Columbiana also has one private school, Heartland Christian School, which opened in 1996.

== Transportation ==
State Route 14 and State Route 46 run east–west through the northern part of the city as a concurrency from East Palestine before meeting an intersection with State Route 164, from which point SR 14 continues westbound to Salem and SR 46 continues northbound to Canfield. SR 164 enters Columbiana as an east–west route concurrent with State Route 344 from Leetonia and switches to running north–south downtown; SR 344 terminates downtown. Finally, State Route 7 passes through western Columbiana near Firestone Farms. The city lies along portions of the Norfolk Southern Railway Fort Wayne Line and the Youngstown and Southeastern Railroad.

== Notable people ==
- Pete Allen, Major League Baseball catcher, proctologist
- J. Warren Bettis, jurist
- Linda Bolon, member of the Ohio House of Representatives from the 1st district
- Harvey S. Firestone, businessman & founder of the Firestone Tire and Rubber Company
- Jacob Hostetter, U.S. Representative from Pennsylvania's 4th District
- Craig Newbold, member of the Ohio House of Representatives from the 1st district
- Monica Robb Blasdel, member of the Ohio House of Representatives from the 79th district
- John D. Shivers Jr., member of the Ohio House of Representatives from the 3rd district
- Paul Stamets, mycologist, advocate of medicinal fungi and mycoremediation
- William Thornton Watson, New Zealander officer in the First and Second Australian Imperial Forces
- Clarence Wetzel, member of the Ohio House of Representatives from the 34th district
- Jason Wilson, member of the Ohio Senate from the 30th district
