= Leetonia, Ohio =

- Village
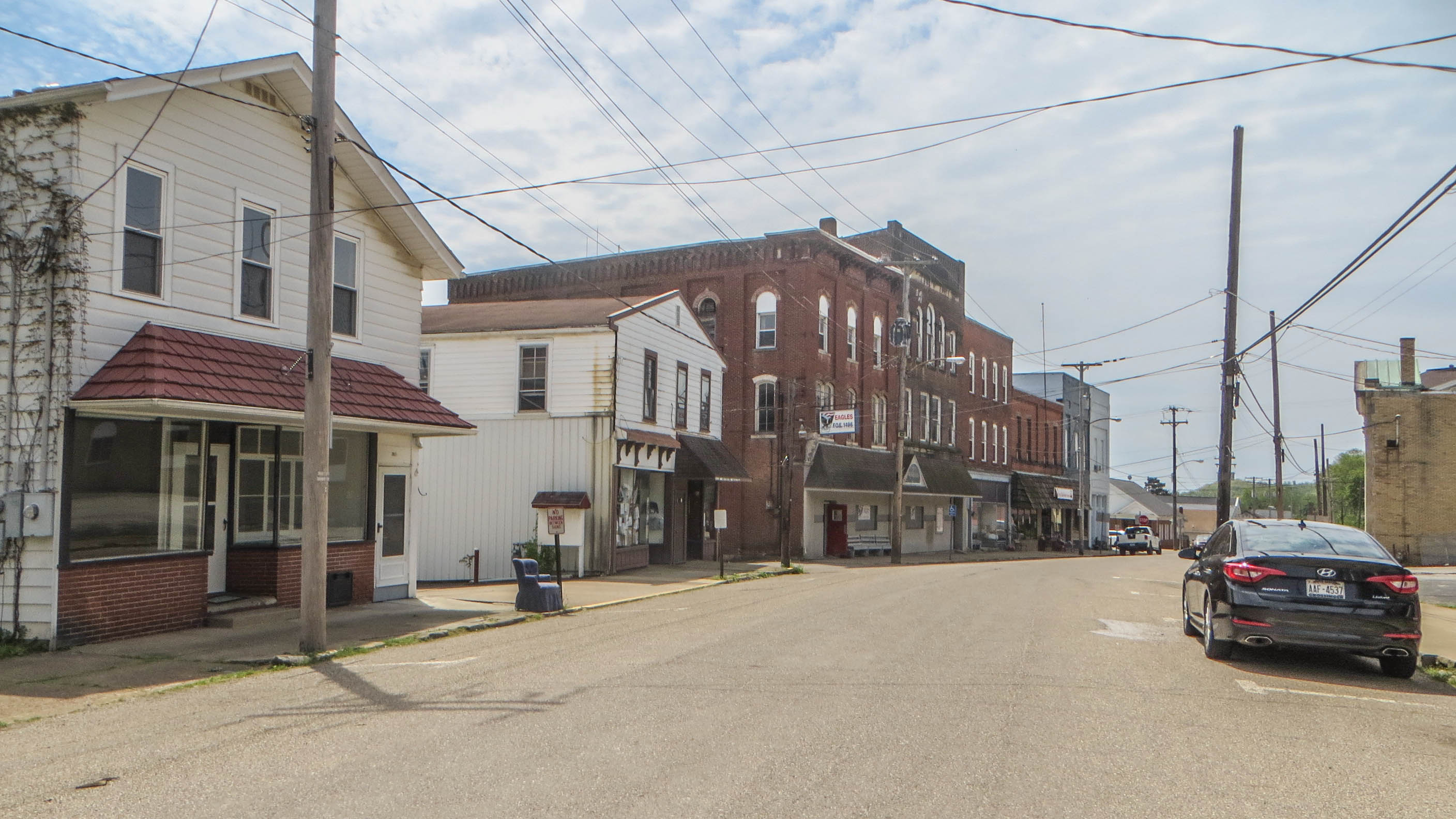
- Main Street, looking west
- Interactive map of Leetonia, Ohio
- Location within Ohio Location within the United States
- Coordinates: 40°52′30″N 80°45′25″W
- Country: United States
- State: Ohio
- County: Columbiana
- Founded: 1869
- Named for: William Lee

Government
  - Type: Mayor-Council
  - Mayor: Kevin Siembida (R)

Area
  - Total: 2.27 sq mi (5.88 km^{2})
  - Land: 2.26 sq mi (5.86 km^{2})
  - Water: 0.0077 sq mi (0.02 km^{2})
- Elevation: 1,102 ft (336 m)

Population (2020)
  - Total: 1,833
  - Density: 809.9/sq mi (312.72/km^{2})
- Time zone: UTC-5 (Eastern (EST))
  - Summer (DST): UTC-4 (EDT)
- ZIP code: 44431
- Area codes: 330, 234
- FIPS code: 39-42560
- GNIS feature ID: 2398413
- School District: Leetonia Exempted Village School District
- Website: http://leetonia.org/

Leetonia is a village in Columbiana County, Ohio, United States. The population was 1,833 at the 2020 census.

== History ==
The village of Leetonia was founded in 1869, following the American Civil War. Leetonia was named for William Lee of Randolph, New York. Lee was one of the founders of the Leetonia Iron and Coal Company which was laid out in the village in 1866-1867.

=== Cherry Valley Coke Ovens ===
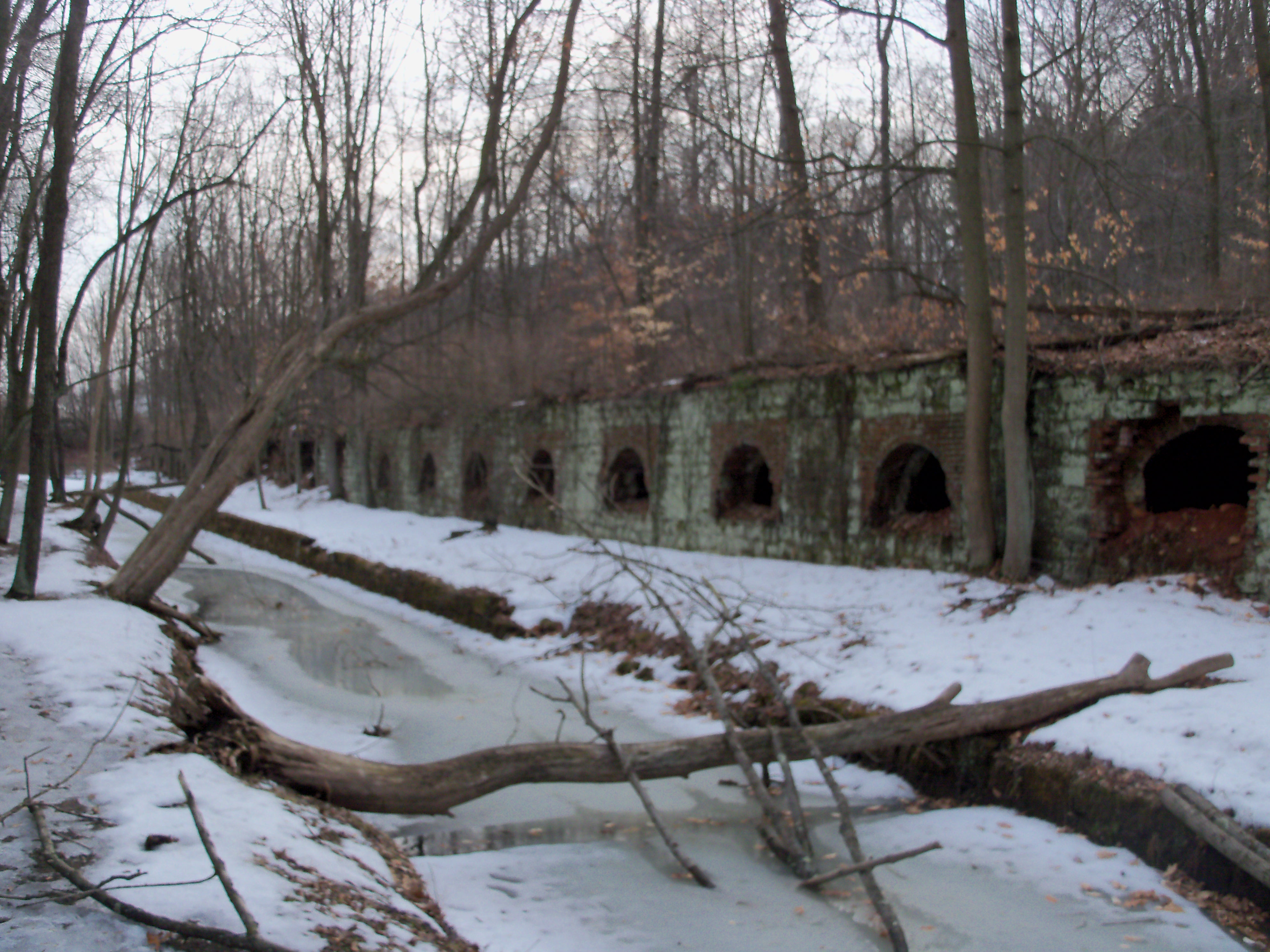
Cherry Valley Coke Ovens

Leetonia is home to one of the few remaining Beehive oven sites in America. In the early 1860s, Irish businessman William Lee discovered rich deposits of coal, ore and lime under the soil of today's Leetonia. Lee began to buy the surrounding land and established the company "The Leetonia Coal & Iron Company" which consisted of a coal mine, coke ovens, and a blast furnace. This company jumped into the iron and coal industry and soon turned the area into a thriving company town. The area went from housing three families in 1864 to 1,800 people by 1869 when it was incorporated.

The coke production was the main operation of the company. Leetonia Coal & Iron would mine the surrounding areas for coal and then cart coal by the tons into the coke ovens on rails above the ovens. The workers would then shovel the coal into the coke ovens to cook. This would purify the coal into a purer product of coal called coke which was then shipped off to the iron mills to be used in smelting iron. Coke has a much higher temperature point than regular coal so it was preferred for use in the mills.

Each coke oven is about 12 feet in diameter and 6 to 7 feet in height with the capacity to hold two to three tons of coal each. While still using 100 ovens, Leetonia Coal & Iron would process 250 tons of coal into coke per day. However, in 1873, the company was bought out and renamed "The Cherry Valley Iron and Coal Company", who expanded operations and eventually had over 200 coke ovens and 4 blast furnaces; processing much more coal than ever before. Financial troubles hit the company during the Great Depression and the ovens were closed permanently.

The site was donated to the village of Leetonia for a park in 1982, and, in 1986, the village council appointed a commission to transform the area into a park.

== Geography ==
According to the United States Census Bureau, the village has a total area of 2.27 square miles (5.88 km^{2}), of which 2.26 square miles (5.85 km^{2}) is land and 0.01 square miles (0.03 km^{2}) is water. It is about 15 miles (24 km) south of Youngstown. One of the features of the downtown district is steep streets heading north out of the village. The railroad tracks of the Norfolk Southern go through the village heading east and west.

== Demographics ==
Historical population
Census	Pop.	Note	%±
1870	1,260		—
1880	2,552		102.5%
1890	2,826		10.7%
1900	2,744		−2.9%
1910	2,665		−2.9%
1920	2,688		0.9%
1930	2,332		−13.2%
1940	2,259		−3.1%
1950	2,565		13.5%
1960	2,543		−0.9%
1970	2,342		−7.9%
1980	2,121		−9.4%
1990	2,070		−2.4%
2000	2,043		−1.3%
2010	1,959		−4.1%
2020	1,833		−6.4%
U.S. Decennial Census

=== 2010 census ===
As of the census of 2010, there were 1,959 people, 748 households, and 541 families living in the village. The population density was 866.8 inhabitants per square mile (334.7/km^{2}). There were 838 housing units at an average density of 370.8 per square mile (143.2/km^{2}). The racial makeup of the village was 97.8% White, 0.2% African American, 0.2% Native American, 0.3% Asian, 0.1% Pacific Islander, 0.1% from other races, and 1.5% from two or more races. Hispanic or Latino of any race were 0.8% of the population.

There were 748 households, of which 36.6% had children under the age of 18 living with them, 52.1% were married couples living together, 15.0% had a female householder with no husband present, 5.2% had a male householder with no wife present, and 27.7% were non-families. 23.3% of all households were made up of individuals, and 11.4% had someone living alone who was 65 years of age or older. The average household size was 2.62 and the average family size was 3.09.

The median age in the village was 38.2 years. 26.1% of residents were under the age of 18; 7.8% were between the ages of 18 and 24; 26.6% were from 25 to 44; 26% were from 45 to 64; and 13.3% were 65 years of age or older. The gender makeup of the village was 49.0% male and 51.0% female.

=== 2000 census ===
As of the census of 2000, there were 2,043 people, 753 households, and 557 families living in the village. The population density was 967.5 inhabitants per square mile (373.6/km^{2}). There were 816 housing units at an average density of 386.4 per square mile (149.2/km^{2}). The racial makeup of the village was 98.92% White, 0.29% African American, 0.34% Native American, 0.05% Asian, and 0.39% from two or more races. Hispanic or Latino of any race were 0.83% of the population.

There were 753 households, out of which 37.1% had children under the age of 18 living with them, 58.0% were married couples living together, 12.0% had a female householder with no husband present, and 26.0% were non-families. 23.0% of all households were made up of individuals, and 11.6% had someone living alone who was 65 years of age or older. The average household size was 2.71 and the average family size was 3.20.

In the village, the population was spread out, with 28.7% under the age of 18, 7.7% from 18 to 24, 29.8% from 25 to 44, 21.8% from 45 to 64, and 12.0% who were 65 years of age or older. The median age was 34 years. For every 100 females there were 99.3 males. For every 100 females age 18 and over, there were 93.4 males.

The median income for a household in the village was $37,714, and the median income for a family was $39,958. Males had a median income of $31,429 versus $20,000 for females. The per capita income for the village was $14,620. About 5.3% of families and 7.0% of the population were below the poverty line, including 8.4% of those under age 18 and 8.5% of those age 65 or over.

== Government ==
Leetonia operates under a mayor–council government, where there are six council members elected as a legislature in addition to an independently elected mayor who serves as an executive. As of 2021, the mayor is Kevin Siembida (R).

== Education ==
Children in Leetonia are served by the Leetonia Exempted Village School District, which includes one elementary school and Leetonia High School.
