= McDonald, Ohio =

- Village
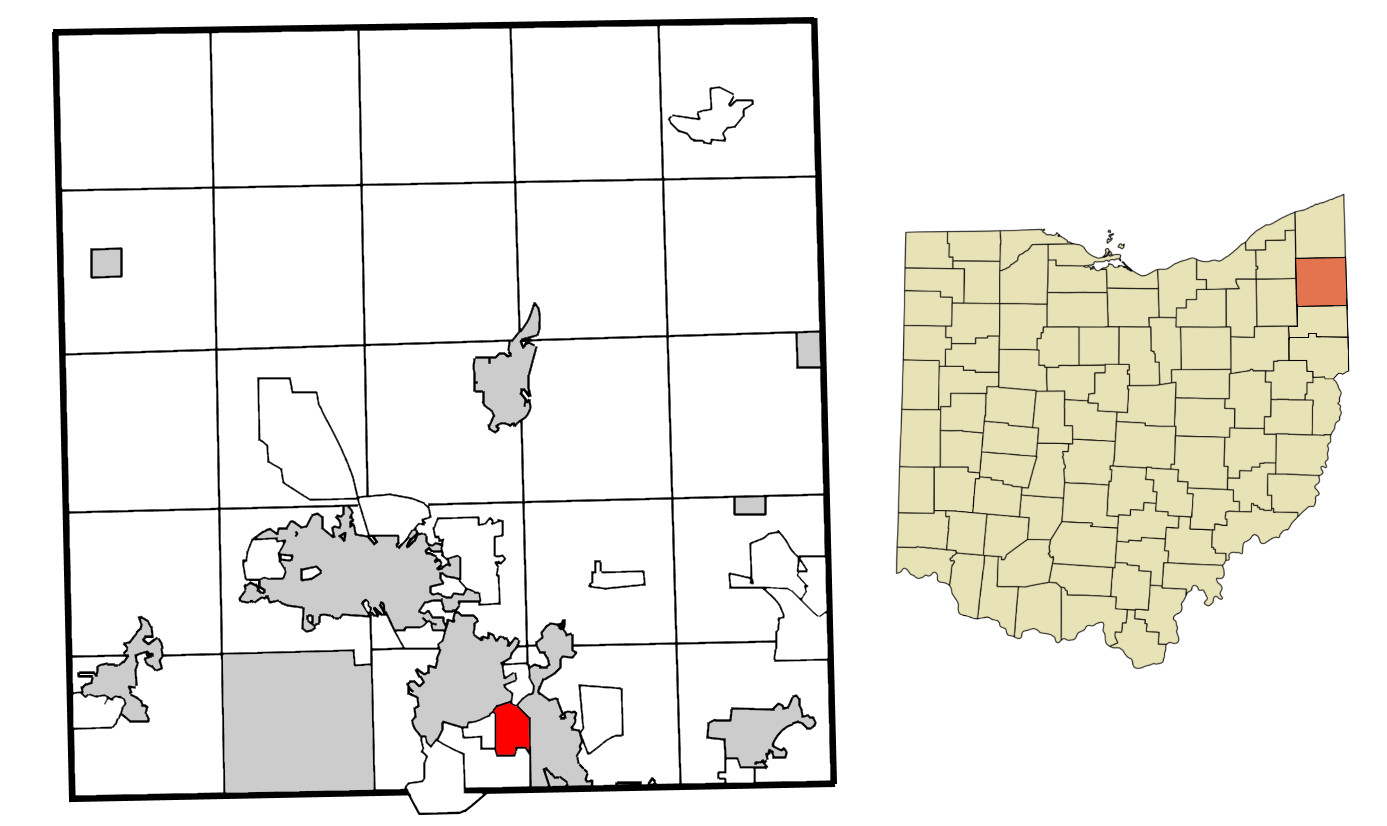
- Location of McDonald in Trumbull County, Ohio.
- Coordinates: 41°09′49″N 80°43′24″W
- Country: United States
- State: Ohio
- County: Trumbull

Government
  - Mayor: Ray Lewis

Area
  - Total: 1.70 sq mi (4.40 km^{2})
  - Land: 1.70 sq mi (4.40 km^{2})
  - Water: 0 sq mi (0.00 km^{2})
- Elevation: 955 ft (291 m)

Population (2020)
  - Total: 3,172
  - Density: 1,866.8/sq mi (720.76/km^{2})
- Time zone: UTC-5 (Eastern (EST))
  - Summer (DST): UTC-4 (EDT)
- ZIP code: 44437
- Area codes: 234/330
- FIPS code: 39-45934
- GNIS feature ID: 2399293
- Website: Village of McDonald

McDonald is a village in southern Trumbull County, Ohio, United States, along the Mahoning River. The population was 3,172 at the 2020 census. It is a suburb in the Youngstown–Warren metropolitan area.

== History ==
The community was named after the local McDonald family. It was founded as a company town by Carnegie Steel, later known as U.S. Steel.

== Geography ==
According to the United States Census Bureau, the village has a total area of 1.69 square miles (4.38 km^{2}), all land.

== Demographics ==
Historical population
Census	Pop.	Note	%±
1920	621		—
1930	1,714		176.0%
1940	1,529		−10.8%
1950	1,858		21.5%
1960	2,727		46.8%
1970	3,177		16.5%
1980	3,744		17.8%
1990	3,526		−5.8%
2000	3,481		−1.3%
2010	3,263		−6.3%
2020	3,172		−2.8%
U.S. Decennial Census

=== 2020 census ===
As of the 2020 census, McDonald had a population of 3,172. The median age was 44.3 years. 21.2% of residents were under the age of 18 and 21.8% of residents were 65 years of age or older. For every 100 females there were 91.4 males, and for every 100 females age 18 and over there were 89.6 males age 18 and over.

100.0% of residents lived in urban areas, while 0.0% lived in rural areas.

There were 1,292 households in McDonald, of which 29.5% had children under the age of 18 living in them. Of all households, 50.2% were married-couple households, 14.6% were households with a male householder and no spouse or partner present, and 29.3% were households with a female householder and no spouse or partner present. About 27.2% of all households were made up of individuals and 15.6% had someone living alone who was 65 years of age or older.

There were 1,369 housing units, of which 5.6% were vacant. The homeowner vacancy rate was 0.7% and the rental vacancy rate was 6.6%.

Racial composition as of the 2020 census
Race	Number	Percent
White	2,939	92.7%
Black or African American	57	1.8%
American Indian and Alaska Native	3	0.1%
Asian	10	0.3%
Native Hawaiian and Other Pacific Islander	0	0.0%
Some other race	11	0.3%
Two or more races	152	4.8%
Hispanic or Latino (of any race)	58	1.8%

=== 2010 census ===
As of the census of 2010, there were 3,263 people, 1,269 households, and 940 families living in the village. The population density was 1,930.8 inhabitants per square mile (745.5/km^{2}). There were 1,370 housing units at an average density of 810.7 per square mile (313.0/km^{2}). The racial makeup of the village was 97.3% White, 1.1% African American, 0.2% Native American, 0.2% Asian, 0.1% from other races, and 1.1% from two or more races. Hispanic or Latino of any race were 1.5% of the population.

There were 1,269 households, of which 33.1% had children under the age of 18 living with them, 56.2% were married couples living together, 12.9% had a female householder with no husband present, 5.0% had a male householder with no wife present, and 25.9% were non-families. 22.9% of all households were made up of individuals, and 10.7% had someone living alone who was 65 years of age or older. The average household size was 2.57 and the average family size was 3.01.

The median age in the village was 41.3 years. 24.2% of residents were under the age of 18; 7.6% were between the ages of 18 and 24; 23.3% were from 25 to 44; 30.1% were from 45 to 64; and 14.9% were 65 years of age or older. The gender makeup of the village was 48.4% male and 51.6% female.

=== 2000 census ===
As of the census of 2000, there were 3,481 people, 1,307 households, and 1,001 families living in the village. The population density was 2,072.4 inhabitants per square mile (800.2/km^{2}). There were 1,352 housing units at an average density of 804.9 per square mile (310.8/km^{2}). The racial makeup of the village was 97.73% White, 1.01% African American, 0.26% Native American, 0.11% Asian, 0.03% Pacific Islander, 0.20% from other races, and 0.66% from two or more races. Hispanic or Latino of any race were 0.95% of the population.

There were 1,307 households, out of which 34.8% had children under the age of 18 living with them, 61.1% were married couples living together, 12.0% had a female householder with no husband present, and 23.4% were non-families. 21.7% of all households were made up of individuals, and 11.4% had someone living alone who was 65 years of age or older. The average household size was 2.66 and the average family size was 3.11.

In the village, the population was spread out, with 25.9% under the age of 18, 7.4% from 18 to 24, 27.3% from 25 to 44, 25.5% from 45 to 64, and 13.9% who were 65 years of age or older. The median age was 38 years. For every 100 females, there were 90.6 males. For every 100 females age 18 and over, there were 84.6 males.

The median income for a household in the village was $41,738, and the median income for a family was $51,346. Males had a median income of $37,935 versus $22,219 for females. The per capita income for the village was $18,173. About 2.9% of families and 4.0% of the population were below the poverty line, including 4.5% of those under age 18 and 4.4% of those age 65 or over.
