= Glenmoor, Ohio =

- Census-designated place
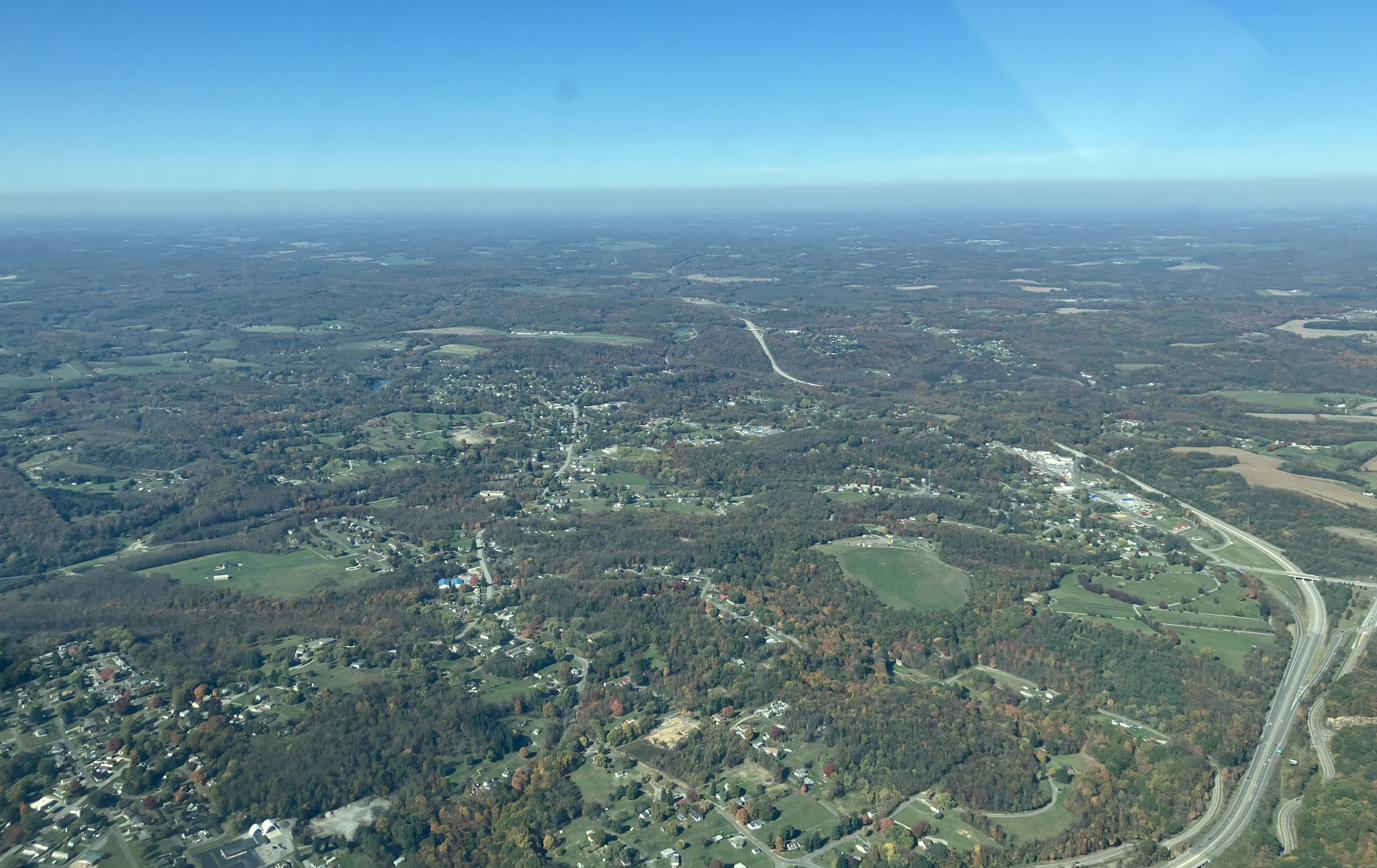

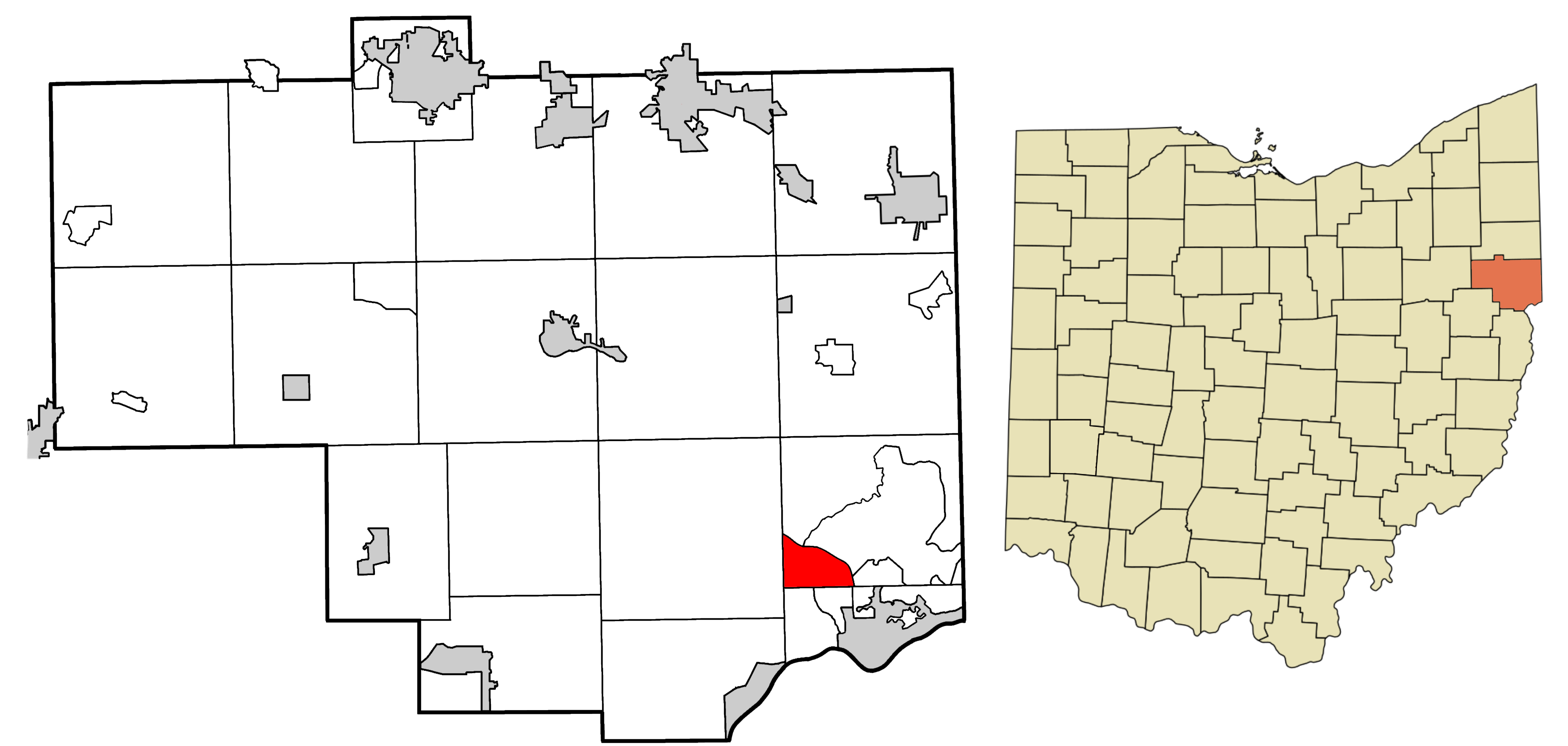
- Location of Glenmoor in Columbiana County, Ohio.

- Location within Ohio Location within the United States
- Coordinates: 40°39′56″N 80°37′23″W
- Country: United States
- State: Ohio
- County: Columbiana
- Township: St. Clair

Area
  - Total: 2.80 sq mi (7.24 km^{2})
  - Land: 2.80 sq mi (7.24 km^{2})
  - Water: 0 sq mi (0.00 km^{2})
- Elevation: 1,135 ft (346 m)

Population (2020)
  - Total: 1,829
  - Density: 654.6/sq mi (252.76/km^{2})
- Time zone: UTC-5 (Eastern (EST))
  - Summer (DST): UTC-4 (EDT)
- FIPS code: 39-30520
- GNIS feature ID: 2393019
- School District: East Liverpool City School District

Glenmoor is an unincorporated community and census-designated place in St. Clair Township, Columbiana County, Ohio, United States. The population was 1,829 at the 2020 census.

== Geography ==
Glenmoor is located in southeastern Columbiana County in the southwest corner of St. Clair Township. Its northeast border is formed by U.S. Route 30, across which is the CDP of Calcutta. It is bordered to the south by La Croft in Liverpool Township and to the west by Madison Township. The city of East Liverpool on the Ohio River is 4 miles (6 km) to the southeast.

According to the United States Census Bureau, the Glenmoor CDP has a total area of 2.8 square miles (7.2 km^{2}), all land.

== Demographics ==
Historical population
Census	Pop.	Note	%±
1980	2,588		—
1990	2,307		−10.9%
2000	2,192		−5.0%
2010	1,987		−9.4%
2020	1,829		−8.0%
U.S. Decennial Census

As of the census of 2000, there were 2,192 people, 877 households, and 637 families residing in the CDP. The population density was 783.6 inhabitants per square mile (302.5/km^{2}). There were 913 housing units at an average density of 326.4 per square mile (126.0/km^{2}). The racial makeup of the CDP was 97.54% White, 1.19% African American, 0.27% Native American, 0.14% Asian, 0.09% from other races, and 0.78% from two or more races. Hispanic or Latino of any race were 0.73% of the population.

There were 877 households, out of which 28.6% had children under the age of 18 living with them, 56.6% were married couples living together, 11.9% had a female householder with no husband present, and 27.3% were non-families. 22.8% of all households were made up of individuals, and 12.8% had someone living alone who was 65 years of age or older. The average household size was 2.50 and the average family size was 2.92.

In the CDP the population was spread out, with 23.6% under the age of 18, 6.3% from 18 to 24, 27.9% from 25 to 44, 24.0% from 45 to 64, and 18.2% who were 65 years of age or older. The median age was 41 years. For every 100 females there were 94.7 males. For every 100 females age 18 and over, there were 89.3 males.

The median income for a household in the CDP was $30,383, and the median income for a family was $36,667. Males had a median income of $32,452 versus $17,209 for females. The per capita income for the CDP was $14,809. About 4.6% of families and 6.9% of the population were below the poverty line, including 15.3% of those under age 18 and 4.2% of those age 65 or over.

== Education ==
Children in Glenmoor are served by the public East Liverpool City School District, which includes two elementary schools, one middle school, and East Liverpool Junior/Senior High School. Glenmoor is also home to the private East Liverpool Christian School.
