= Beaver Local School District =

School district in Ohio, United States

Address
- 46090 Bell School Road East Liverpool, Ohio, 43920; United States
- Coordinates: 40°42′40″N 80°37′49″W

District information
- Type: Public
- Grades: K–12
- Superintendent: Eric Lowe
- Schools: 3
- NCES District ID: 3904642

Students and staff
- Students: 1,724 (2025–2026)
- Teachers: 96.53 (on an FTE basis) (2025–2026)
- Staff: 138.25 (on an FTE basis) (2025–2026)
- Student–teacher ratio: 17.86 (2025–2026)
- District mascot: Fighting Beavers
- Colors: Red; White

Other information
- Website: www.beaver.k12.oh.us

Beaver Local School District is a public school district in southeastern Columbiana County, Ohio, United States. The district covers nearly 144 square miles (370 km^{2}) across portions of Elkrun, Madison, Middleton, and St. Clair townships, including the communities of Calcutta, Lake Tomahawk, and Rogers. The district's sports teams are nicknamed the Beavers, and the district's colors are red and white.

== History ==
On November 19, 1934, the Columbiana County Board of Education passed a resolution establishing the Beaver Rural School District. The district was a consolidation of the following existing rural school districts at that time: Elkrun, Madison, Middleton, Negley, St. Clair, and parts of Center and Fairfield Centralized. The district was named after the Little Beaver Creek, which runs through most of the district. Later, the name was changed to the Beaver Local School District. The high school was established in 1956, and its first class graduated in 1959 with 70 students.

== Schools ==
=== High schools ===
- Beaver Local High School

=== Middle schools ===
- Beaver Local Middle School

=== Elementary schools ===
- Beaver Local Elementary School

=== Former schools ===
- Calcutta Elementary School – 15482 State Route 170, Calcutta; built c. 1950, closed and demolished in 2015
- Beaver Local High/Middle School #1 – 13052 State Route 7, Lisbon; built in 1956, closed and demolished in 2015
- Beaver Local High School #2 – 13187 State Route 7, Lisbon; built c. 1963, closed and demolished in 2015
- Elkton Elementary School – 42491 Elk Alley, Lisbon; built in 1958, closed in the 1990s
- Rogers Elementary School – 8059 Sprucevale Road, Rogers; built in 1951, closed and demolished in 2015
- West Point Elementary School – 13360 West Point Road, West Point; built in 1953, closed and demolished in 2015
