= Beaver Local High School =

Location
- 46090 Bell School Road; East Liverpool, Ohio 43920; United States
- Coordinates: 40°42′42″N 80°37′48″W

Information
- Type: Public, Coeducational high school
- Established: 1956
- School district: Beaver Local School District
- Superintendent: Eric Lowe
- CEEB code: 362988
- Principal: Aaron Walker
- Teaching staff: 29.00 (FTE)
- Grades: 9-12
- Student to teacher ratio: 17.86
- Campus type: Fringe Rural
- Colors: Red and White
- Athletics conference: Buckeye 8 Athletic League; Ohio Valley Athletic Conference
- Team name: Beavers
- Yearbook: L'année
- Website: www.beaver.k12.oh.us

Beaver Local High School is a public high school near East Liverpool, Ohio, United States. It is the only high school in the Beaver Local School District. Athletic teams are known as the Beavers and compete as a member of the Ohio High School Athletic Association in the Buckeye 8 Athletic League and the Ohio Valley Athletic Conference.

== History ==
Beaver Local was formed in 1956 with 400 students from in-district grade schools and transfers from nearby David Anderson Junior/Senior High School, East Liverpool Junior/Senior High School, and East Palestine High School. It is named after Little Beaver Creek, which runs through most of the school district. The first class graduated in 1959 with 70 students. In 2015, a new K–12 campus was built in St. Clair Township adjacent to the former Beaver Local Middle School site.

== Academics ==
Beaver Local High School serves students in grades 9-12 and offers courses in the traditional American curriculum. Entering their third and fourth years, students can elect to attend the Columbiana County Career and Technical Center in Lisbon as either a part-time or full-time student.

== Athletics ==
Beaver Local High School currently offers:

- Baseball
- Basketball
- Bowling
- Cheerleading
- Cross Country
- Golf
- Football
- Soccer
- Softball
- Swimming
- Tennis
- Track and field
- Volleyball
- Wrestling

== Notable alumni ==
- Derek Wolfe, former professional football player in the National Football League (NFL)
