= Gaston's Mill-Lock No. 36, Sandy and Beaver Canal District =

Historic district in Ohio, United States

- Gaston's Mill-Lock No. 36, Sandy And Beaver Canal District
- U.S. National Register of Historic Places
- U.S. Historic district
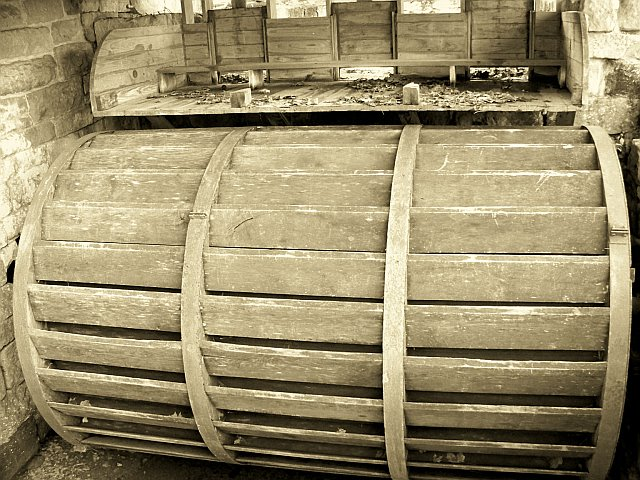
- Water wheel at Gaston's Mill

- Location within Ohio Location within the United States
- Nearest city: Clarkson, Ohio
- Coordinates: 40°43′39″N 80°36′46″W
- Area: 12 acres (4.9 ha)
- Built: 1834
- Architect: Samuel Conkle
- NRHP reference No.: 74001423
- Added to NRHP: May 23, 1974

Gaston's Mill-Lock No. 36, Sandy and Beaver Canal District, is a historic district listed in the National Register of Historic Places. The district is located within Beaver Creek State Park, approximately 1 mile south of Clarkson, Ohio. Gaston's Mill was constructed in 1837 and was powered by Little Beaver Creek. Lock 36 was one of 90 locks on the Sandy and Beaver Canal. Construction of this canal began in 1834 but was not completed until 1848.

Restoration and reconstruction of the mill began in 1964 and today it grinds whole wheat flour, corn meal and buckwheat flour. Gaston's Mill is the only working water-powered grist mill in Columbiana County. The rebuilding of Lock 36 began in 1988 and was completed in 1991. The lock was restored as an example of how locks were used to raise and lower boats in the canal.

== History ==
Gaston's Mill was built by Samuel Conkle around 1837, on land that was then part of his father Jacob's farm; the land came into his possession in 1843 after his father's death. Conkle employed the mill with a wide range of grains, including corn, wheat, oats, and buckwheat. In 1849, he sold the mill along with the land and water privileges to James Gaston. The mill is named for Philander Gaston, James Gaston's son, who owned the mill longer than any other owner. The mill was water powered until Gaston sold it in 1886. Subsequently, the source of power changed to steam and then to gasoline. The mill was in operation until World War I. At its peak, the mill produced nearly 200 pounds of flour per day.

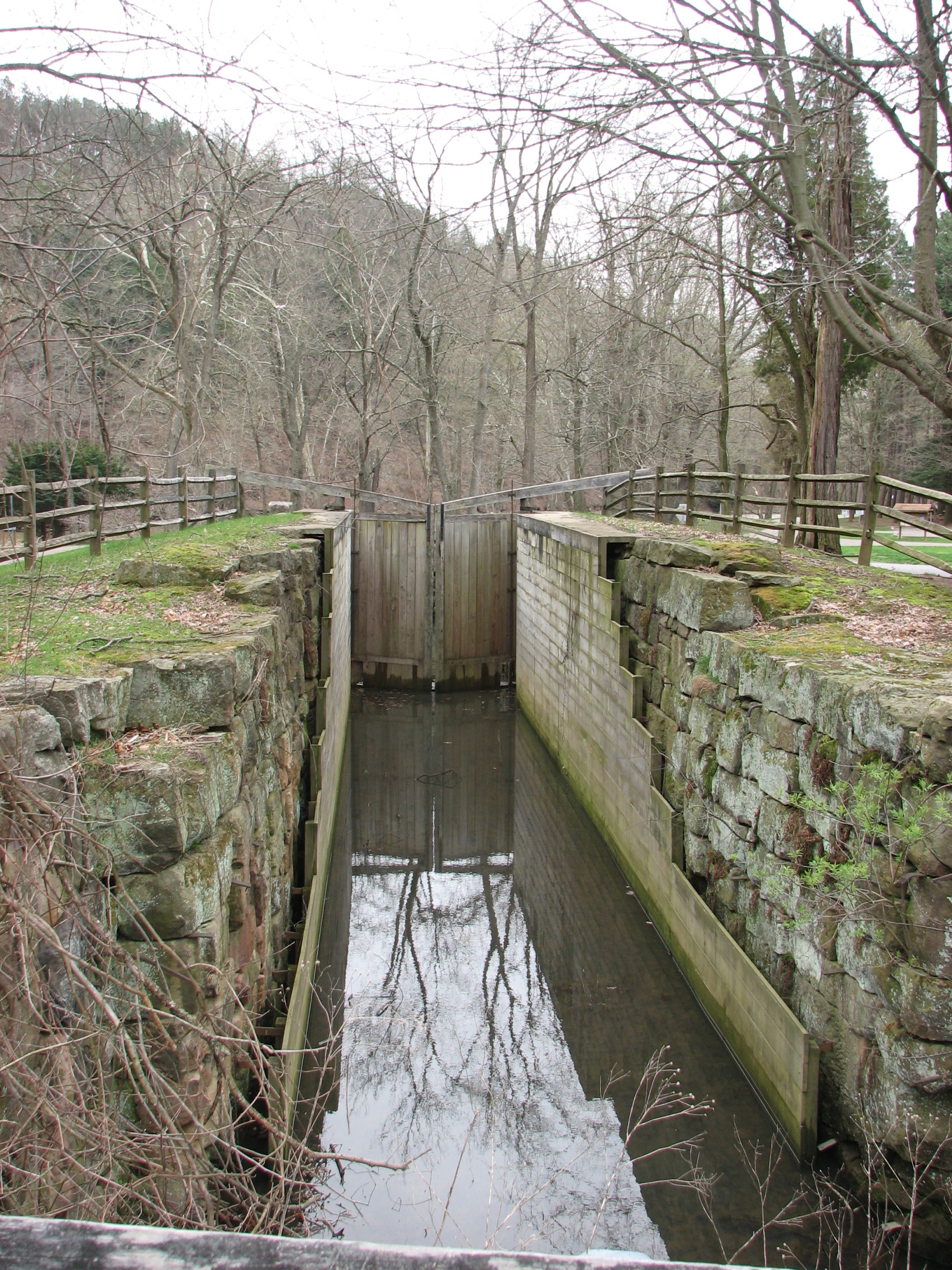
Lock 36

Lock 36 was one of 90 locks on the Sandy and Beaver Canal. The canal was under construction between 1828 and 1848. The canal was built as a "feeder" canal to join the Ohio and Erie Canal.

== Restoration ==
The mill was renovated under the auspices of the Columbiana Forests and Park Council (now the "Friends of Beaver Creek State Park"). Restoration began in January 1964. The council commissioned Lorin Cameron of Damascus, Ohio to undertake the restoration of the mill. During the reconstruction, the building was straightened and wood beams were replaced in the basement. The mill's siding and part of the floors were replaced and a new shingle roof was installed. A new roof was put on the building using shingles produced by an old shingle machine built in 1857 in Salem, Ohio. Most of the wood timbers and posts are original.

Restoration of Lock 36 began in 1988 and was completed in 1991. The cantilevered wood-beam gates used in the restoration were built during a workshop held at Beaver Creek State Park. The builders, Christian & Son Timber, constructed the gates using period tools and dressed as craftsmen of the mid-1800s.

Today, the renovated mill and lock are part of Pioneer Village in Beaver Creek State park. The village, open to visitors, is operated by the Friends of Beaver Creek State park. The Blanche Williams Home near the mill, home of the last private owner of the mill, burned down in 2013.

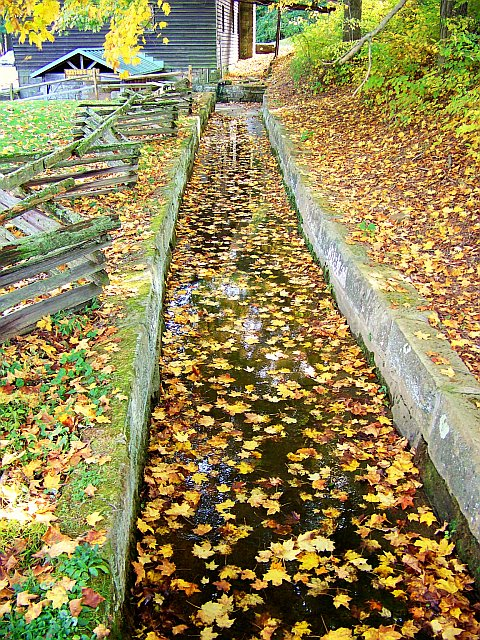
Mill race Leading to Gaston's Mill

== Recognition ==
Gaston's Mill-Lock No. 36, Sandy And Beaver Canal District (section) was added to the National Register of Historic Places in May 1974. The property was selected according to National Register criteria that recognizes that Gaston's Mill-Lock No. 36, Sandy And Beaver Canal District is "associated with events that have made significant contributions to broad patterns of history" and that the district embodies "distinctive characteristics of a type, period, or method of construction or represent the works of a master, or possess high artistic values, or represent a significant and distinguishable entity." Its significance is due partially to its rarity: the route from Elkton and Fredericktown was formerly lined with six mills, but Gaston's is the only one that remains.
