= Lake Tomahawk, Ohio =

- Census-designated place
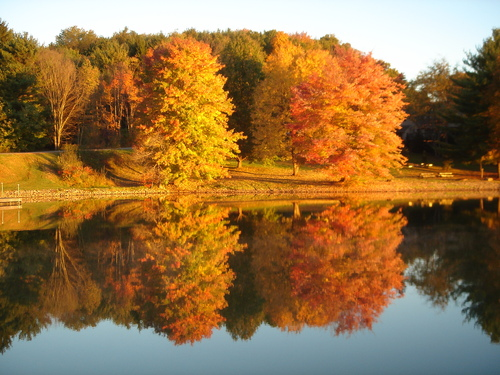
- Lake Tomahawk reservoir
- Motto: "A Piece of Paradise on Earth"
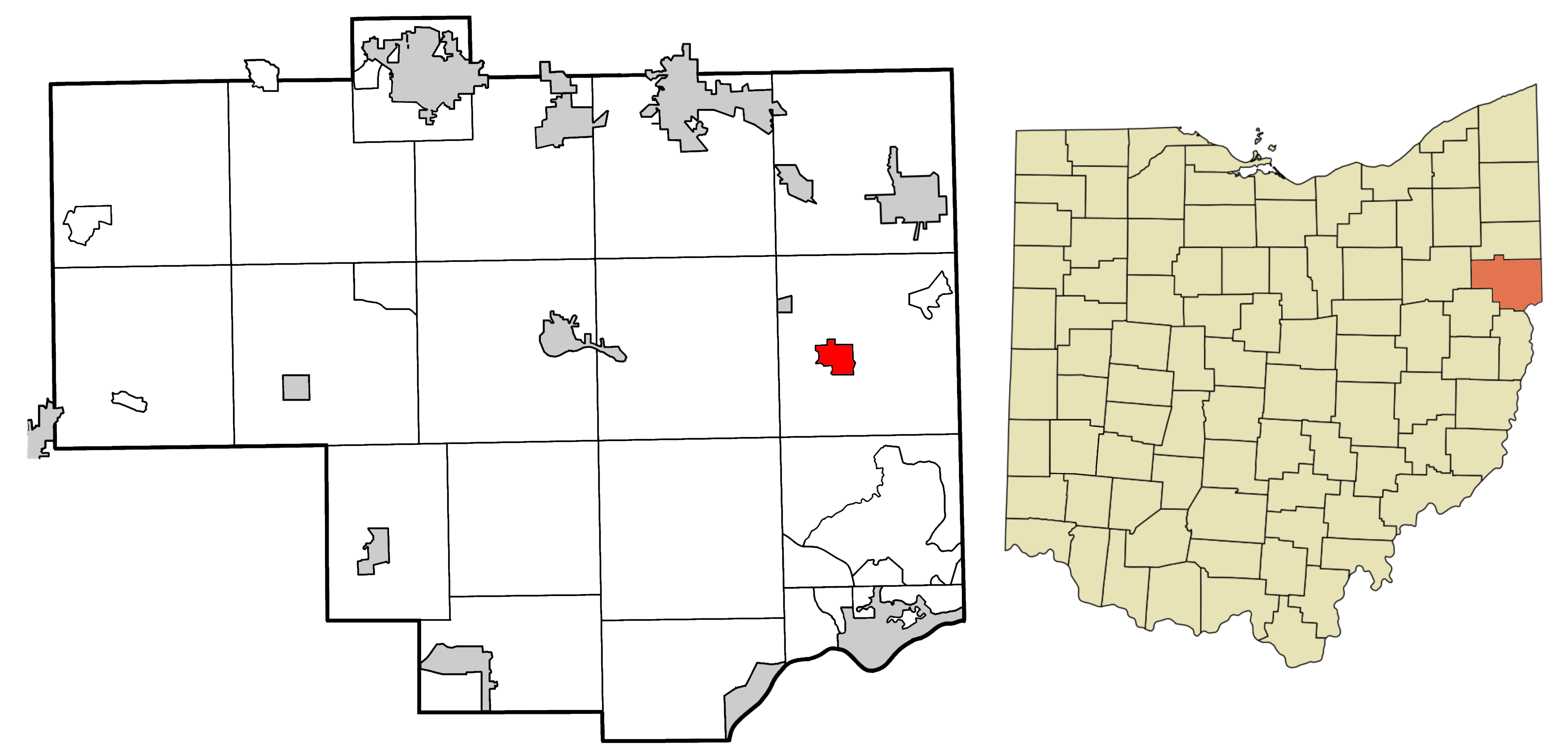
- Location of Lake Tomahawk in Columbiana County, Ohio.

- Location within Ohio Location within the United States
- Coordinates: 40°45′50″N 80°35′43″W
- Country: United States
- State: Ohio
- County: Columbiana
- Township: Middleton

Area
  - Total: 1.02 sq mi (2.65 km^{2})
  - Land: 0.83 sq mi (2.14 km^{2})
  - Water: 0.20 sq mi (0.51 km^{2})
- Elevation: 1,096 ft (334 m)

Population (2020)
  - Total: 494
  - Density: 598/sq mi (230.9/km^{2})
- Time zone: UTC-5 (Eastern (EST))
  - Summer (DST): UTC-4 (EDT)
- ZIP code: 44441
- Area codes: 330, 234
- FIPS code: 39-41597
- GNIS Feature ID: 2628921
- School District: Beaver Local School District
- Website: www.ltpoa.org

Lake Tomahawk is an unincorporated community and census-designated place in Middleton Township, Columbiana County, Ohio, United States. The population was 494 at the 2020 census. It was established in 1966 by the American Realty Service Corporation as a private planned community surrounding the man-made Lake Tomahawk reservoir.

== Reservoir ==
Lake Tomahawk is 150-acre (61 ha) and is surrounded by 630 acres (250 ha) of residential homes and scenic property. It is a man-made, spring-fed lake, home to a variety of stocked fish. The average lake depth is 35 feet (11 m) with a maximum depth of 65 feet (20 m) at the dam. There is a 750-foot (230 m) beach with a picnic pavilion, a children's playground, and lighted tennis, volleyball and basketball courts. The community has a driving range and archery range. There are six docking areas with a total of 26 slips and a marina with a boat launching ramp and gasoline pump. With over 200 feet (61 m) of sandy beach, the lake is enjoyed by swimmers, boaters, waterskiers, and fishermen.

== Geography ==
According to the United States Census Bureau, the CDP has a total area of 0.8 square miles (2.07 km^{2}).

=== Climate ===
Lake Tomahawk has four distinct seasons, with precipitation somewhat evenly spread throughout the year. Extreme temperature variations occur during the winter only. Tomahawk usually has its wettest month during May and its warmest temperatures in late July and August.

The elevation of Lake Tomahawk is 1,135 feet (346 m) above sea level at its highest elevation (Lake Tomahawk Dam).

Lake Tomahawk gets on average 37 inches (940 mm) of rain per year. Snowfall is 28 inches (710 mm). The number of days with any measurable precipitation is 130.

On average, there are 162 sunny days per year in Lake Tomahawk. The average July high is around 84 °F (29 °C). The January low is 18 °F (−8 °C). The comfort index, which is based on humidity during the hot months, is a 49 out of 100, where higher is more comfortable. The US average on the comfort index is 44.

== Demographics ==
Historical population
Census	Pop.	Note	%±
2010	485		—
2020	494		1.9%
U.S. Decennial Census

== Government ==
Lake Tomahawk is governed by a property owners association. Lake Tomahawk has a nine-member board, with three members elected every year. The board's responsibilities include the management of the lake, roads, marina, beach, treasury, security, legal, conservation and lake activities. Lake Tomahawk has its own private security force which patrols the lake and its grounds while enforcing lake regulations.

== Education ==
Children in Lake Tomahawk are served by the public Beaver Local School District, which includes one elementary school, one middle school, and Beaver Local High School.
