= East Liverpool City School District =

School district in Ohio

Location
- East Liverpool, Ohio; United States
- Coordinates: 40°37′26″N 80°35′17″W

District information
- Type: Public school district
- Grades: K-12
- Superintendent: Jonathan Ludwig
- School board: East Liverpool City Schools Board of Education
- NCES District ID: 3904391

Students and staff
- Enrollment: 2,051 (2020-2021)
- Faculty: 130.10 (on an FTE basis)
- Student–teacher ratio: 15.76

Other information
- Website: www.elpotters.school

The East Liverpool City School District is a public school district serving the communities of East Liverpool, La Croft, Glenmoor, and Liverpool Township in southeastern Columbiana County in the U.S. state of Ohio. The district includes one junior/senior high school, one middle school, and two elementary schools.

== Current schools ==
| Current School Name | Year built | Current Grades Housed | Additional Info (Additions made, Architect, Current Status, Etc.) |
|---|---|---|---|
| East Liverpool Junior/Senior High School | 1968 | 7-12 | Open |
| Westgate Middle School | 1956 | Pre-K, 5-6 | Open |
| LaCroft Elementary School | 1956 | K-4 | Open |
| North Elementary School | 1968 | K-4 | Open |

== Defunct Schools ==
| School name | Year built | Year closed | Current Status |
|---|---|---|---|
| Central High School | 1894 | 1968 | Demolished 1969 Site of East Liverpool Alumni Association |
| East Elementary School | ? | 2010 | Demolished in 2010 |
| East Junior High School | 1954 | 2010 | Vacant |
| East Liverpool High School | 1914 | 1968 | Kent State University at East Liverpool |
| Garfield School | 1888 | 1968 | Community center |
| Glenmoor School | 1937 | 1968 | East Liverpool Christian School |
| Grant Street School | 1886 | 1956 | Demolished |
| Horace Mann School | 1902 | 1968 | Demolished in 1982 |
| Klondyke School | 1919 | 1968 | Demolished in 1972 |
| Lincoln School | 1909 | 1968 | Demolished in 2009 |
| McKinley School | 1902 | 1968 | Vacant |
| Neville School | 1905 | 1968 | Demolished in 1999 |
| Pleasant Heights School | 1918 | 1968 | Apartment Complex |
| Sixth Street School | 1880 | 1956 | Demolished |
| Taft School | 1909 | 1968 | Wee the People Preschool and Daycare III |
| Third Street School | 1891 | 1956 | Demolished |
| Union High School | 1851 | 1894 | Demolished |
| Walkers School | 1906 | 1956 | Demolished |
| Washington School | 1912 | 1956 | Apartment Complex |
| West End School | 1888 | 1956 | Demolished |
