= Williamsport, Ohio (disambiguation) =

Williamsport, Ohio is a village in Pickaway County.

Williamsport, Ohio may also refer to:

- Williamsport, Columbiana County, Ohio, an unincorporated community
- Williamsport, Morrow County, Ohio, an unincorporated community
