= La Croft, Ohio =

- Census-designated place
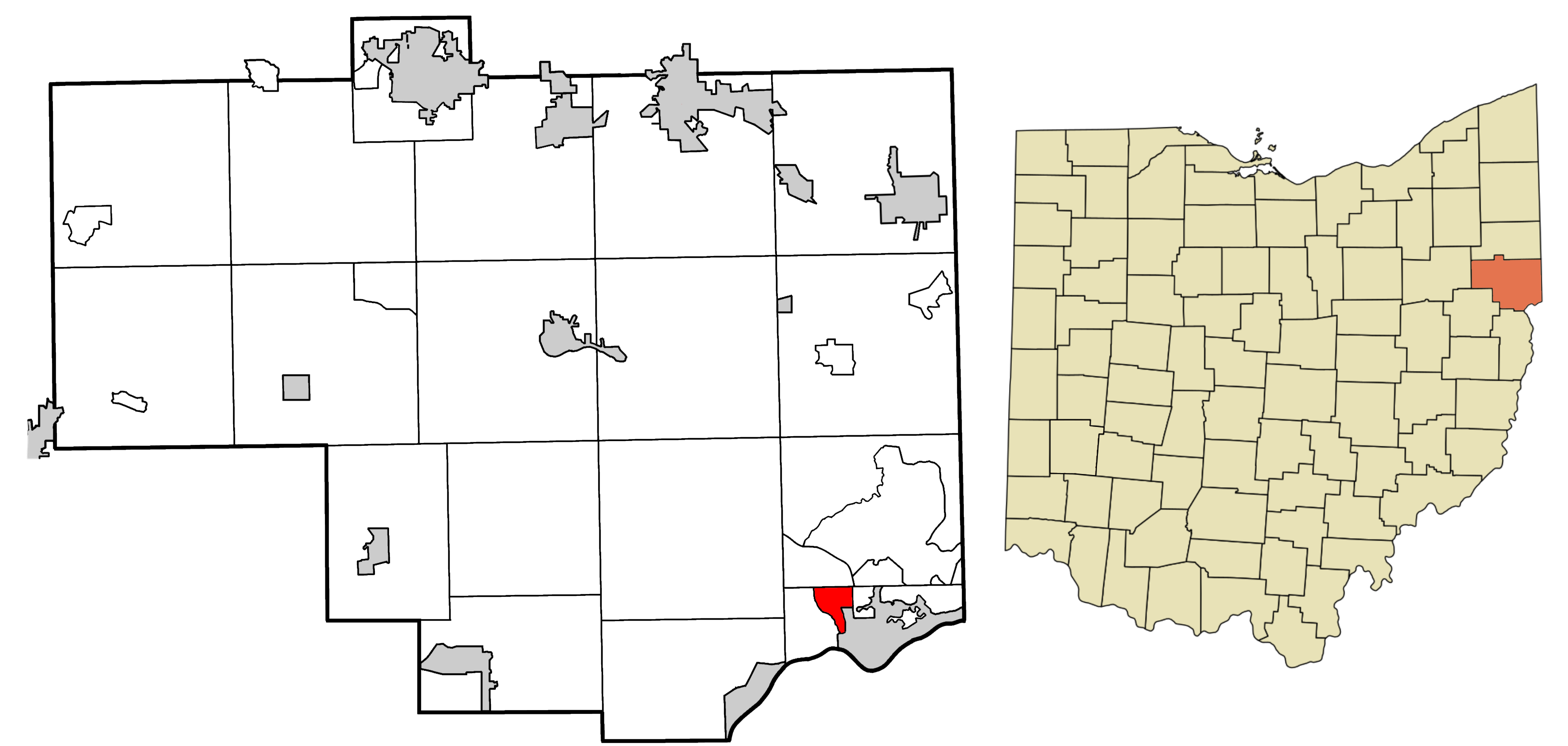
- Location of La Croft in Columbiana County, Ohio.

- Location within Ohio Location within the United States
- Coordinates: 40°38′49″N 80°35′59″W
- Country: United States
- State: Ohio
- County: Columbiana
- Township: Liverpool

Area
  - Total: 1.14 sq mi (2.96 km^{2})
  - Land: 1.14 sq mi (2.96 km^{2})
  - Water: 0 sq mi (0.00 km^{2})
- Elevation: 1,188 ft (362 m)

Population (2020)
  - Total: 1,078
  - Density: 944.0/sq mi (364.48/km^{2})
- Time zone: UTC-5 (Eastern (EST))
  - Summer (DST): UTC-4 (EDT)
- FIPS code: 39-41090
- GNIS feature ID: 2393073
- School District: East Liverpool City School District

La Croft is an unincorporated community and census-designated place in Liverpool Township, Columbiana County, Ohio, United States. The population was 1,078 at the 2020 census.

== Geography ==
La Croft is located in southeastern Columbiana County and is bordered to the southeast by the city of East Liverpool and to the north by unincorporated Glenmoor.

According to the United States Census Bureau, the La Croft CDP has a total area of 1.14 square miles (2.96 km^{2}), all land.

== Demographics ==
Historical population
Census	Pop.	Note	%±
1980	1,508		—
1990	1,427		−5.4%
2000	1,307		−8.4%
2010	1,144		−12.5%
2020	1,078		−5.8%
U.S. Decennial Census

As of the census of 2000, there were 1,307 people, 512 households, and 373 families residing in the CDP. The population density was 1,147.7 inhabitants per square mile (443.1/km^{2}). There were 537 housing units at an average density of 471.5 per square mile (182.0/km^{2}). The racial makeup of the CDP was 98.93% White, 0.46% African American, 0.15% Native American, 0.08% Asian, and 0.38% from two or more races. Hispanic or Latino of any race were 0.38% of the population.

There were 512 households, out of which 31.4% had children under the age of 18 living with them, 57.2% were married couples living together, 10.0% had a female householder with no husband present, and 27.0% were non-families. 23.0% of all households were made up of individuals, and 11.1% had someone living alone who was 65 years of age or older. The average household size was 2.55 and the average family size was 2.98.

In the CDP, the population was spread out, with 24.7% under the age of 18, 7.2% from 18 to 24, 28.1% from 25 to 44, 26.0% from 45 to 64, and 14.0% who were 65 years of age or older. The median age was 40 years. For every 100 females, there were 96.5 males. For every 100 females age 18 and over, there were 98.4 males.

The median income for a household in the CDP was $28,750, and the median income for a family was $35,000. Males had a median income of $29,712 versus $18,750 for females. The per capita income for the CDP was $13,528. About 11.1% of families and 11.5% of the population were below the poverty line, including 10.1% of those under age 18 and 8.6% of those age 65 or over.

== Education ==
Children in La Croft are served by the public East Liverpool City School District, which includes two elementary schools, one middle school, and East Liverpool Junior/Senior High School.
