= Calcutta, Ohio =

- Census-designated place
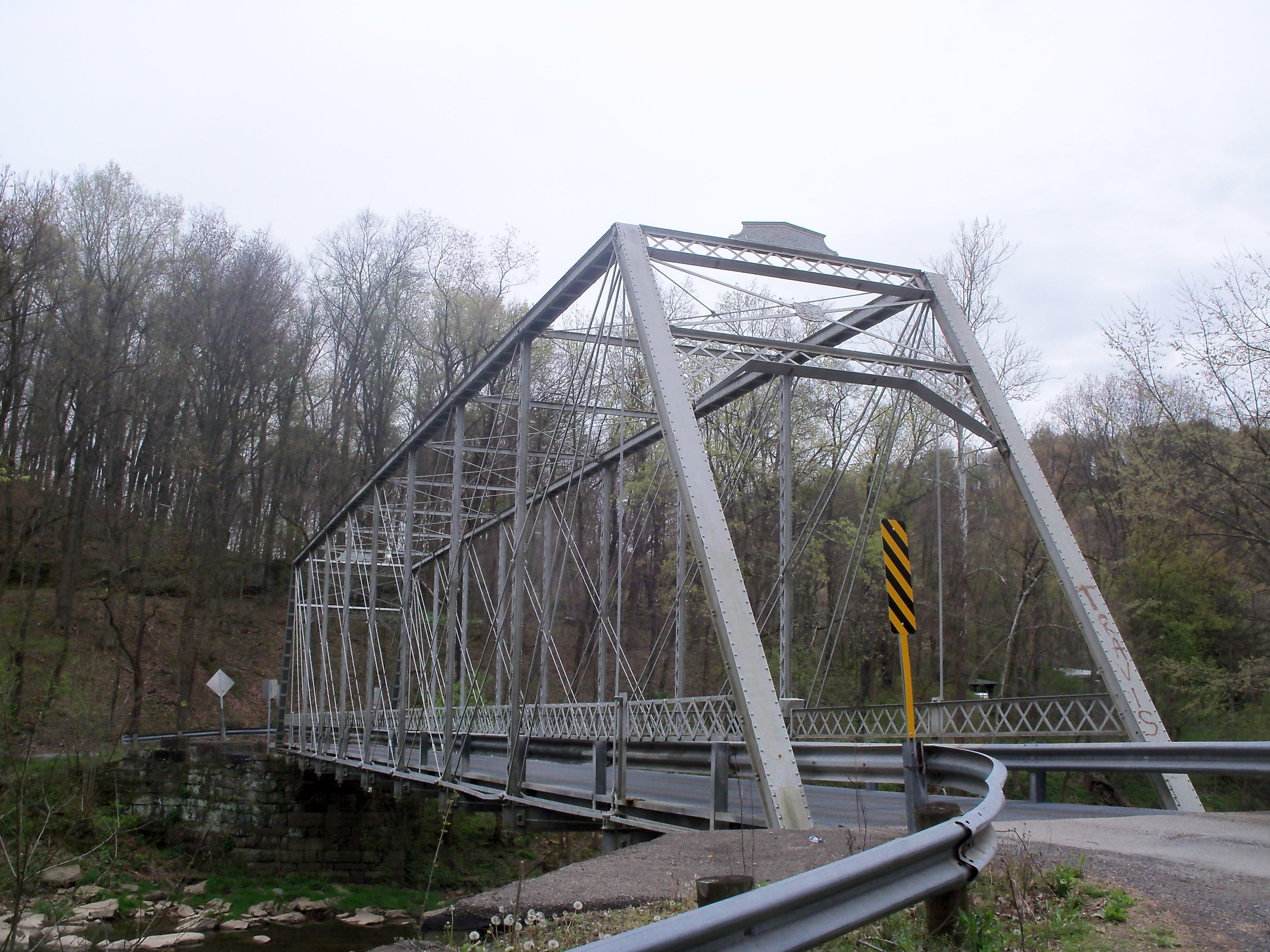
- Grimms Bridge (1884) crosses the Little Beaver Creek east of State Route 170

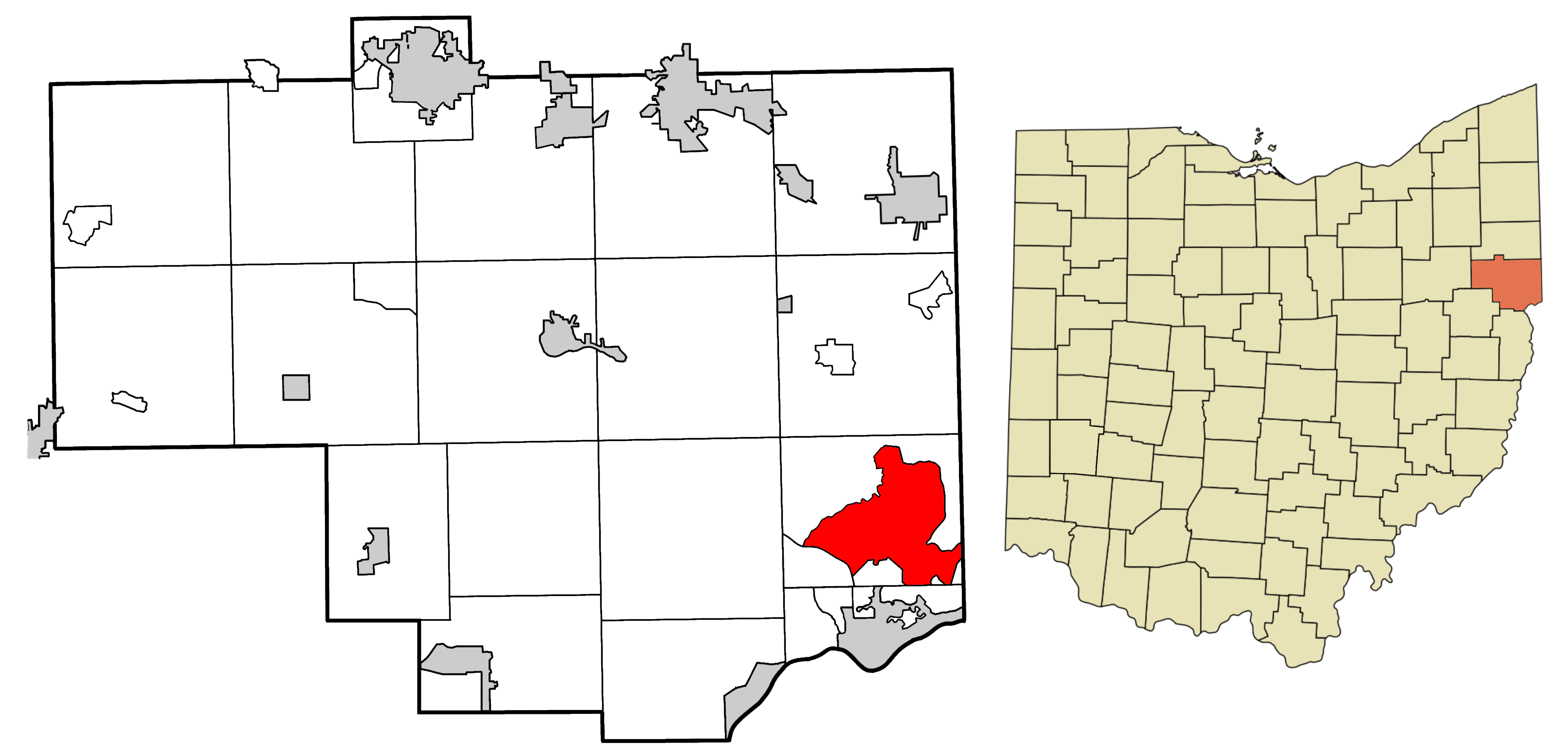
- Location of Calcutta in Columbiana County, Ohio

- Location within Ohio Location within the United States
- Coordinates: 40°41′02″N 80°33′43″W
- Country: United States
- State: Ohio
- County: Columbiana
- Township: St. Clair
- Established: 1810
- Named for: Kolkata, India

Area
  - Total: 12.19 sq mi (31.56 km^{2})
  - Land: 12.17 sq mi (31.52 km^{2})
  - Water: 0.012 sq mi (0.03 km^{2})
- Elevation: 1,129 ft (344 m)

Population (2020)
  - Total: 3,941
  - Density: 323.8/sq mi (125.02/km^{2})
- Time zone: UTC-5 (Eastern (EST))
  - Summer (DST): UTC-4 (EDT)
- ZIP code: 43920
- Area codes: 330, 234
- FIPS code: 39-10926
- GNIS feature ID: 2393360
- School District: Beaver Local School District

Calcutta is an unincorporated community and census-designated place in St. Clair Township, Columbiana County, Ohio, United States. The population was 3,941 at the 2020 census.

== History ==
The first permanent settlement in the area was in 1792 or 1793 by hunter John Quinn. Calcutta was laid out in 1810 as West Union. It had also been called Foulkstown after William Foulks, who built the first brick house there, as well as Nineveh, after the Biblical city of the same name. It was ultimately renamed after the Indian city of Kolkata, formerly anglicized as Calcutta. A post office called Calcutta was established in 1838 and remained in operation until 1913.

William Holmes McGuffey, a college professor who is best known for writing the McGuffey Readers textbooks, established his first subscription school in Calcutta in 1814, where he was an instructor to 48 students.

Historically a rural town, Calcutta experienced development in the 20th century as businesses from neighboring East Liverpool relocated to larger shopping centers along Ohio State Route 170.

== Geography ==
Calcutta is located near the center of St. Clair Township in southeastern Columbiana County. According to the United States Census Bureau, the Calcutta CDP has a total area of 11.88 square miles (30.76 km^{2}), of which 11.86 square miles (30.73 km^{2}) is land and 0.012 square miles (0.03 km^{2}), or 0.11%, is water. The Calcutta CDP extends southwest as far as the U.S. Route 30 expressway, and east and north as far Little Beaver Creek, touching the Pennsylvania state line where the creek crosses the border briefly. The CDP is bordered by Longs Run, a tributary of Little Beaver Creek, on the northwest. To the southwest of Calcutta, across US 30, is the CDP of Glenmoor. The city of East Liverpool is 4 miles (6 km) to the south via St. Clair Avenue.

== Demographics ==
Historical population
Census	Pop.	Note	%±
1980	1,121		—
1990	1,212		8.1%
2000	3,491		188.0%
2010	3,742		7.2%
2020	3,941		5.3%
U.S. Decennial Census

=== 2020 census ===
As of the 2020 census, Calcutta had a population of 3,941. The median age was 50.3 years. 17.8% of residents were under the age of 18 and 28.3% of residents were 65 years of age or older. For every 100 females there were 86.9 males, and for every 100 females age 18 and over there were 81.3 males age 18 and over.

38.7% of residents lived in urban areas, while 61.3% lived in rural areas.

There were 1,668 households in Calcutta, of which 21.8% had children under the age of 18 living in them. Of all households, 51.4% were married-couple households, 14.1% were households with a male householder and no spouse or partner present, and 28.8% were households with a female householder and no spouse or partner present. About 32.4% of all households were made up of individuals and 19.1% had someone living alone who was 65 years of age or older.

There were 1,781 housing units, of which 6.3% were vacant. The homeowner vacancy rate was 1.5% and the rental vacancy rate was 5.8%.

Racial composition as of the 2020 census
Race	Number	Percent
White	3,701	93.9%
Black or African American	23	0.6%
American Indian and Alaska Native	2	0.1%
Asian	43	1.1%
Native Hawaiian and Other Pacific Islander	0	0.0%
Some other race	15	0.4%
Two or more races	157	4.0%
Hispanic or Latino (of any race)	46	1.2%

=== 2000 census ===
As of the census of 2000, there were 3,491 people, 1,417 households, and 1,025 families residing in the CDP. The population density was 297.1 inhabitants per square mile (114.7/km^{2}). There were 1,473 housing units at an average density of 125.4 per square mile (48.4/km^{2}). The racial makeup of the CDP was 98.51% White, 0.17% African American, 0.06% Native American, 0.72% Asian, 0.09% from other races, and 0.46% from two or more races. Hispanic or Latino of any race were 0.66% of the population.

There were 1,417 households, out of which 27.7% had children under the age of 18 living with them, 62.2% were married couples living together, 7.7% had a female householder with no husband present, and 27.6% were non-families. 25.2% of all households were made up of individuals, and 14.9% had someone living alone who was 65 years of age or older. The average household size was 2.38 and the average family size was 2.84.

In the CDP the population was spread out, with 20.6% under the age of 18, 5.7% from 18 to 24, 23.7% from 25 to 44, 27.4% from 45 to 64, and 22.6% who were 65 years of age or older. The median age was 45 years. For every 100 females there were 86.9 males. For every 100 females age 18 and over, there were 84.6 males.

The median income for a household in the CDP was $36,194, and the median income for a family was $45,750. Males had a median income of $41,077 versus $21,352 for females. The per capita income for the CDP was $19,536. About 3.0% of families and 8.3% of the population were below the poverty line, including 8.1% of those under age 18 and 9.7% of those age 65 or over.

== Parks and recreation ==
Beaver Creek State Park is located north of Calcutta, with Beaver Creek State Forest immediately to its east.

== Education ==
Children in Calcutta are served by the public Beaver Local School District, which includes one elementary school, one middle school, and Beaver Local High School.

== Transportation ==
U.S. Route 30 passes through Calcutta as a four-lane divided highway with limited access concurrent with State Route 7, which travels northbound to Lisbon and southbound to East Liverpool. State Route 170 originates in Calcutta at an interchange with US 30/SR 7 and forms the main road of the town, traveling northbound toward East Palestine.
