= Clarkson, Ohio =

- Unincorporated community
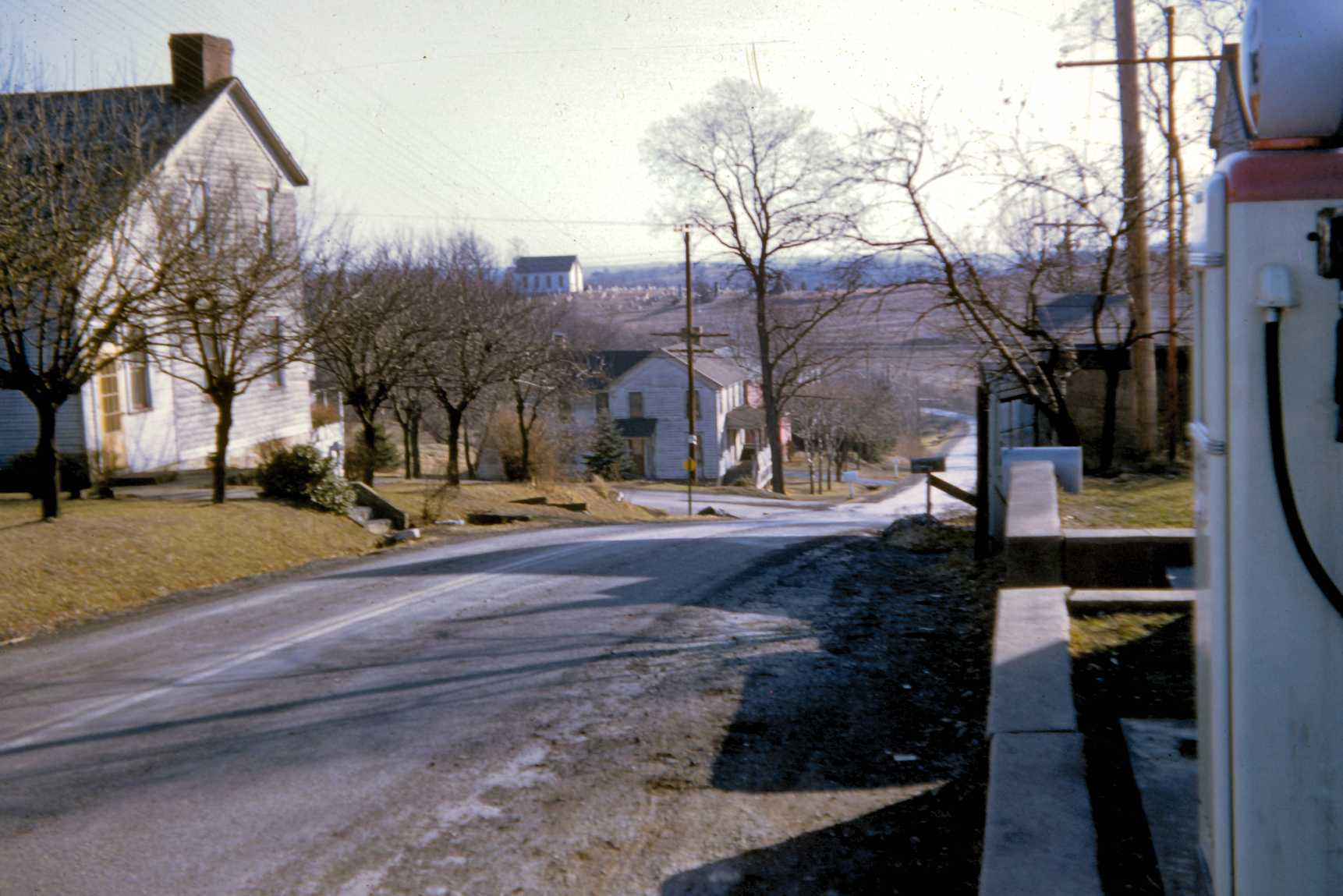
- Clarkson, looking south towards Clarkson Presbyterian Church

- Location within Ohio Location within the United States
- Coordinates: 40°44′49″N 80°36′48″W
- Country: United States
- State: Ohio
- County: Columbiana
- Township: Middleton
- Elevation: 1,181 ft (360 m)
- Time zone: UTC-5 (Eastern (EST))
  - Summer (DST): UTC-4 (EDT)
- ZIP code: 44455
- Area codes: 330, 234
- GNIS Feature ID: 1056809

Clarkson is an unincorporated community in Middleton Township, Columbiana County, Ohio, United States.

== History ==
Clarkson was platted in February 1816 by Robert Hanna, who moved there in a conestoga wagon with his wife. It was surveyed by William Heald. Hanna built and resided in a log tavern at the intersection of two roads. This building was later known as the Edward McGinnis tavern.

In 1817, James Monroe, while President of the United States, visited his cousin, Catherine Hanna, in Clarkson. A post office was established in Clarkson in 1833 and remained until 1935. By 1879, Clarkson had two churches, three stores, and about 30 houses.

An early settler and businessman was Milo Warrick who, in 1840, was a cabinet maker and undertaker in Clarkson. His son, Clement Vlandingham Warrick, opened a general store in Clarkson in 1885. He established the first Standard Oil dealership in Ohio, holding vendor's license Number 1.

Bank robber Pretty Boy Floyd was shot and killed by FBI agents in a corn field near Clarkson in 1934.

Gaston's Mill, named for Clarkson resident Philander Gaston, lies within Beaver Creek State Park. The mill was built in 1837 and has been restored.
