= Liverpool Township, Ohio =

Liverpool Township, Ohio, may refer to:

- Liverpool Township, Columbiana County, Ohio
- Liverpool Township, Medina County, Ohio

== See also ==
- East Liverpool, Ohio, a city in Columbiana County
