= Beaver Creek State Forest =

Protected forest in Ohio, United States

Coordinates: 40°41′35″N 80°31′27″W

- Location within Ohio Location within the United States
- Location: Columbiana County, Ohio, US
- Nearest city: Calcutta, Ohio
- Area: 1,122 acres (4.54 km^{2})
- Established: 1998
- Governing body: Ohio Department of Natural Resources

Beaver Creek State Forest is a state forest in Columbiana County, Ohio, United States. It became the state's 20th state forest in 1998.

Little Beaver Creek runs through the forest and is a popular spot for fishing and kayaking. Hunting is permitted under the regulations of the Division of Wildlife. Beaver Creek State Forest is open to the public from 6AM to 11PM. Camping is not permitted.
