= Derek Wolfe =

American football player (born 1990)

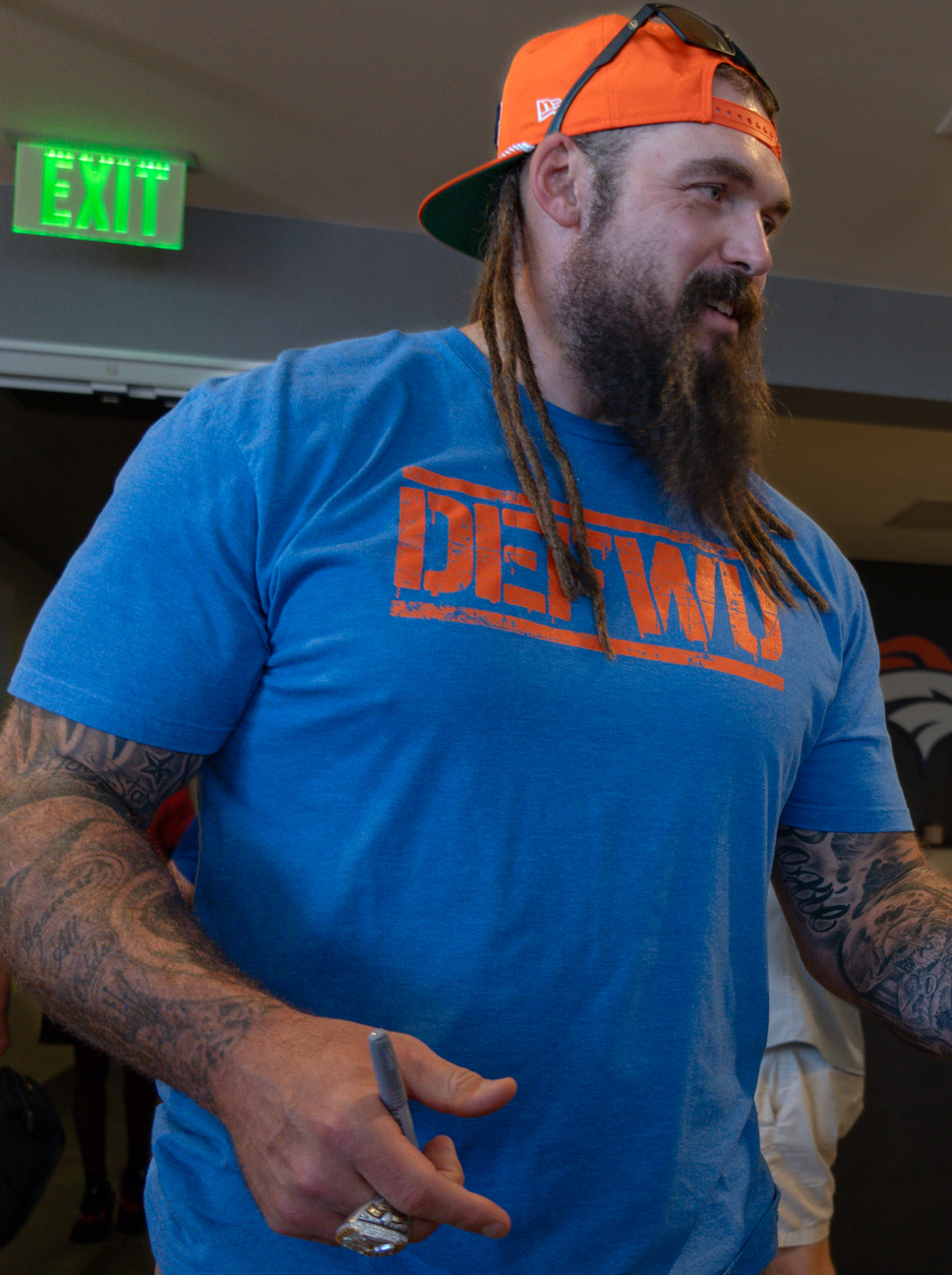
- Wolfe in 2023

No. 95
- Position: Defensive end

Personal information
- Born: February 24, 1990 (age 36); Lisbon, Ohio, U.S.
- Listed height: 6 ft 5 in (1.96 m)
- Listed weight: 285 lb (129 kg)

Career information
- High school: Beaver Local (Lisbon)
- College: Cincinnati (2008–2011)
- NFL draft: 2012: 2nd round, 36th overall pick

Career history
- Denver Broncos (2012–2019); Baltimore Ravens (2020–2021)

Awards and highlights
- Super Bowl champion (50); Second-team All-American (2011); 2011 Co-Big East Defensive Player of the Year; First-team All-Big East (2011)

Career NFL statistics
- Total tackles: 316
- Sacks: 34
- Forced fumbles: 1
- Fumble recoveries: 3
- Pass deflections: 15
- Interceptions: 1
- Stats at Pro Football Reference

Derek Wolfe (born February 24, 1990) is an American former professional football player who was a defensive end in the National Football League (NFL). He played college football for the Cincinnati Bearcats and was selected by the Denver Broncos in the second round of the 2012 NFL draft, playing his first eight years with them before signing with the Baltimore Ravens in 2020. Wolfe announced his retirement on July 28, 2022.

== Early life and college career ==
Wolfe is from the rural town of Negley, Ohio, along the Ohio–Pennsylvania border. He attended Beaver Local High School in nearby East Liverpool, Ohio, and graduated in 2008. Wolfe was considered a standout at Beaver Local High School and is the only player in the school's history to be drafted by the NFL.

Wolfe played four seasons at the University of Cincinnati from 2008 through 2011. He accumulated 162 total tackles, 37 tackles for loss, and 19 sacks during his tenure with the Cincinnati Bearcats football team. Wolfe was named co-Big East Defensive Player of the Year as a senior.

== Professional career ==
External videos
- Derek Wolfe’s NFL Combine Workout

Pre-draft measurables
| Height | Weight | Arm length | Hand span | Wingspan | 40-yard dash | 10-yard split | 20-yard split | 20-yard shuttle | Three-cone drill | Vertical jump | Broad jump | Bench press |
|---|---|---|---|---|---|---|---|---|---|---|---|---|
| 6 ft 5 1/8 in (1.96 m) | 295 lb (134 kg) | 33 1/4 in (0.84 m) | 10 3/4 in (0.27 m) | 6 ft 8 1/4 in (2.04 m) | 5.01 s | 1.69 s | 2.85 s | 4.44 s | 7.26 s | 33.5 in (0.85 m) | 9 ft 0 in (2.74 m) | 33 reps |
All values from NFL Combine

=== Denver Broncos ===
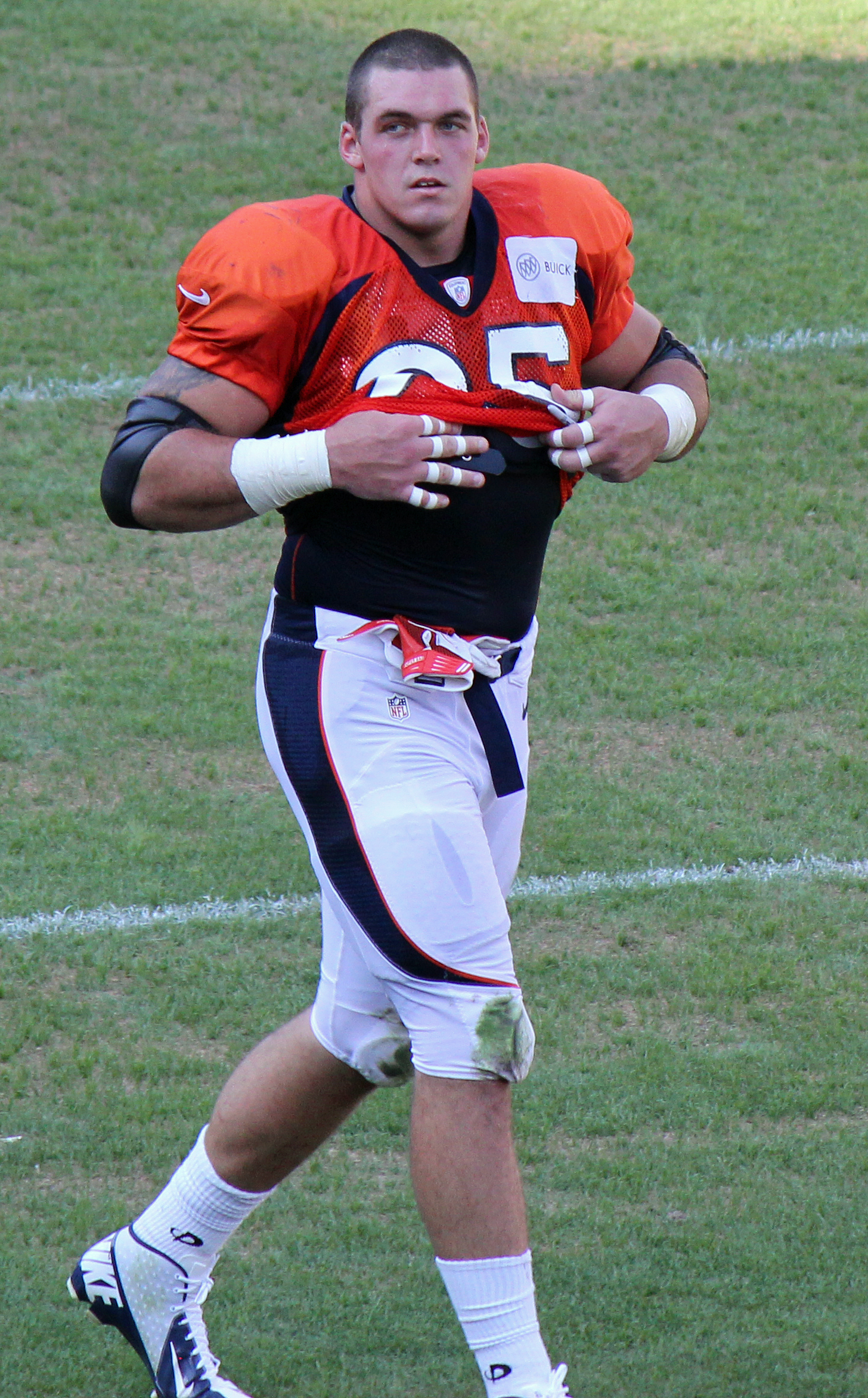
Wolfe playing in the 2012 preseason

External videos
- Broncos draft Derek Wolfe 36th overall

The Denver Broncos selected Wolfe in the second round of the 2012 NFL draft as the 36th overall pick. Wolfe was the fourth defensive tackle drafted in 2012. Wolfe was the first Beaver Local High School graduate to get drafted in the school's history, and the first Mahoning Valley native selected in the 2012 NFL draft. On May 21, 2012, the Denver Broncos signed Wolfe to a four-year, $5.20 million contract that includes $3.09 million guaranteed and a signing bonus of $2.22 million.

In his first NFL game in the regular season against the Pittsburgh Steelers, Wolfe came out with 3 tackles and a sack for a loss of 9 yards. Wolfe finished his rookie season with 40 tackles, six sacks, and two passes defended. His six sacks were third most on the team, behind Von Miller and Elvis Dumervil.

Wolfe had a tough sophomore season. In a preseason game against the Seattle Seahawks, Wolfe suffered a spinal cord injury and was carted off the field. That, along with two bouts of food poisoning, led to him losing 20 pounds, and he was therefore not as productive on the field. On November 29, Wolfe suffered a seizure on the bus ride to Denver International Airport for their Chiefs matchup in Kansas City and after the season, it was reported that the seizure was related to the spinal cord injury. Despite hopes that he might return to the field, he was eventually placed on Injured Reserve. Without Wolfe, the Broncos reached Super Bowl XLVIII where they lost to the Seattle Seahawks.

The 2015 season was the best of Wolfe's career. After serving a four-game suspension for a PED violation, Wolfe returned to establish himself as one of the best-run stuffers in the game, which eventually led to him being named AFC Defensive Player of the Week after the Broncos defense completely neutralized the undefeated Green Bay Packers offense in Week 8. Wolfe signed a four-year extension with the Broncos worth $36.7 million on January 15, 2016, before their first playoff game on January 17.

On February 7, 2016, Wolfe was part of the Broncos team that won Super Bowl 50. In the game, the Broncos defeated the Carolina Panthers by a score of 24–10. He had five tackles and 0.5 sacks in the Super Bowl.

In 2016, Wolfe posted a career-high in tackles with 51, and in passes defended with four. The Broncos finished the 2016 season with a 9–7 record and missed the playoffs for the first time in Wolfe's career.

On December 5, 2017, Wolfe was placed on injured reserve with a neck injury. On December 2, 2019, Wolfe was placed on injured reserve after suffering a dislocated elbow in Week 13.

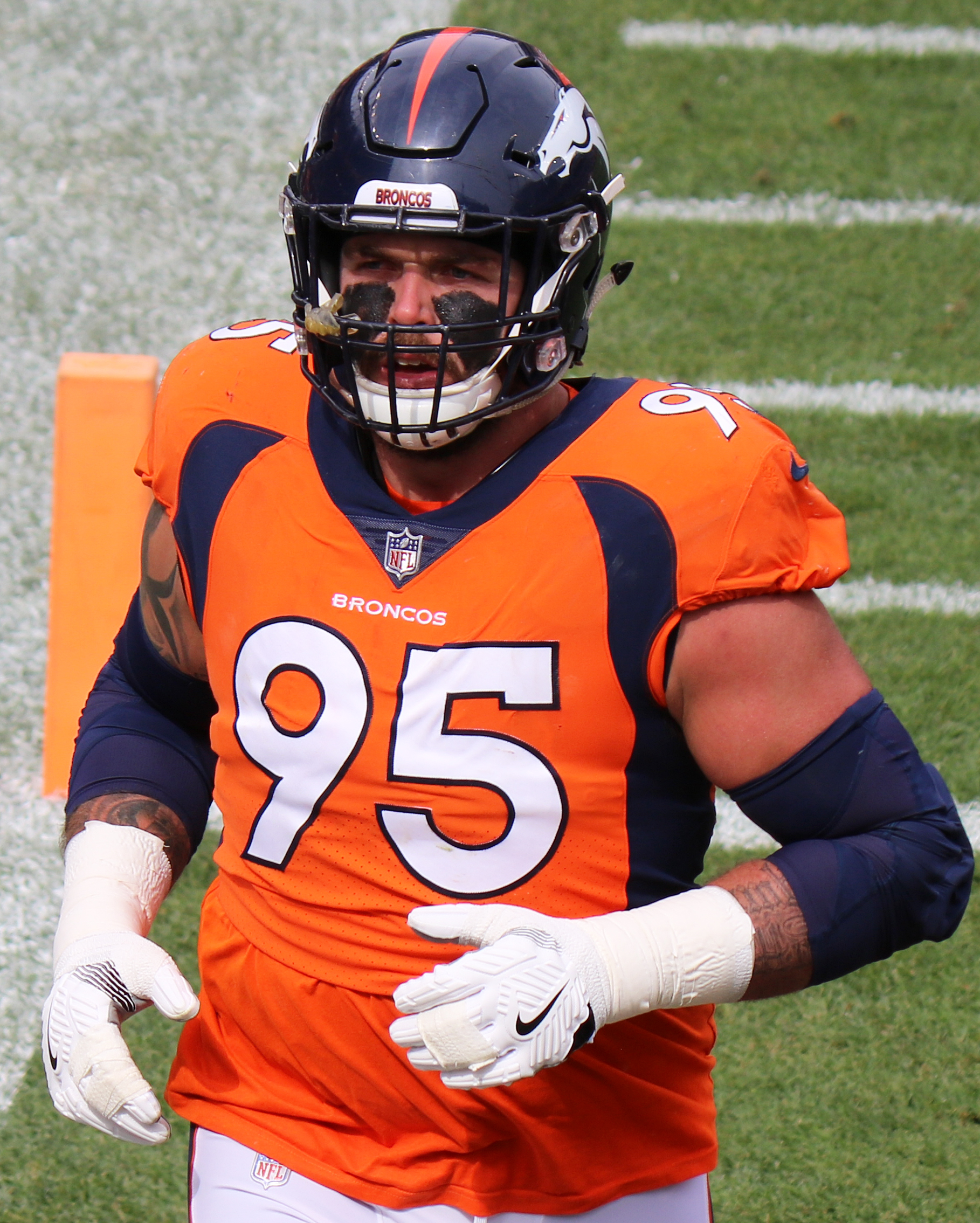
Wolfe with the Broncos in 2018

=== Baltimore Ravens ===
On March 31, 2020, Wolfe signed a one-year, $3 million deal with the Baltimore Ravens. In Week 15 against the Jacksonville Jaguars, Wolfe recorded his first sack as a Raven on Gardner Minshew and recovered a fumble lost by Minshew during the 40–14 win.

Wolfe agreed to a three-year, $12 million contract extension with the Ravens on March 17, 2021. On October 2, 2021, Wolfe suffered a hip injury during practice and was placed on injured reserve. On October 26, 2021, Wolfe was designated to return to practice from injured reserve. However, on November 15, 2021, head coach John Harbaugh said that Wolfe was expected to be out for the rest of the season.

=== Retirement ===
On June 14, 2022, Wolfe and the Ravens came to terms on an injury settlement leading to his release from the team. On July 29, 2022, Wolfe announced his retirement from professional football, signing a one-day contract with the Denver Broncos to retire as a member of the team.

=== NFL career statistics ===
Legend
| | Team won the Super Bowl |
| **Bold** | Career high |

==== Regular season ====
| Year | Team | GP | GS | Tackles | | | | | Interceptions | | | | | | Fumbles |
| Year | Team | GP | GS | Comb | Total | Ast | Sck | SFTY | PDef | Int | Yds | Avg | Lng | TD | FF |
|---|---|---|---|---|---|---|---|---|---|---|---|---|---|---|---|
| 2012 | DEN | **16** | **16** | 40 | 26 | 14 | 6.0 | — | 2 | — | — | — | — | — | — |
| 2013 | DEN | 11 | 11 | 16 | 11 | 5 | 4.0 | — | — | — | — | — | — | — | — |
| 2014 | DEN | **16** | **16** | 35 | 24 | 11 | 1.5 | — | 1 | — | — | — | — | — | — |
| 2015 | DEN | 12 | 12 | 49 | 35 | 14 | 5.5 | — | 1 | — | — | — | — | — | — |
| 2016 | DEN | 14 | 14 | **51** | **38** | 13 | 5.5 | — | 4 | — | — | — | — | — | — |
| 2017 | DEN | 11 | 11 | 31 | 18 | 13 | 2.0 | — | — | — | — | — | — | — | — |
| 2018 | DEN | **16** | **16** | 43 | 31 | 12 | 1.5 | — | **6** | **1** | **2** | **2.0** | **2** | — | — |
| 2019 | DEN | 12 | 12 | 34 | 23 | 11 | **7.0** | — | 1 | — | — | — | — | — | **1** |
| 2020 | BAL | 14 | 8 | 51 | 19 | 32 | 1.0 | — | 2 | — | — | — | — | — | — |
| 2021 | BAL | 0 | 0 | DNP | | | | | | | | | | | |
| Total | | 110 | 104 | 350 | 225 | 125 | 34.0 | 0 | 17 | 1 | 2 | 2.0 | 2 | 0 | 1 |

==== Playoffs ====
| Year | Team | GP | GS | Tackles | | | | | Interceptions | | | | | | Fumbles |
| Year | Team | GP | GS | Comb | Total | Ast | Sck | SFTY | PDef | Int | Yds | Avg | Lng | TD | FF |
|---|---|---|---|---|---|---|---|---|---|---|---|---|---|---|---|
| 2012 | DEN | 1 | 1 | 3 | 2 | 1 | — | — | — | — | — | — | — | — | — |
| 2014 | DEN | 1 | 1 | 3 | 2 | 1 | — | — | — | — | — | — | — | — | — |
| 2015 | DEN | **3** | **3** | **15** | **10** | **5** | **2.5** | — | **1** | — | — | — | — | — | — |
| 2020 | BAL | 2 | 2 | 7 | 5 | 2 | 1.0 | — | — | — | — | — | — | — | — |
| Total | | 7 | 7 | 28 | 19 | 9 | 3.5 | 0 | 1 | 0 | 0 | 0 | 0 | 0 | 0 |

== Personal life ==
During the discussion concerning kneeling during the national anthem, Wolfe sent comments to ESPN stating the following: this is the "greatest country in the world and if you don't think we are the greatest country in the world and you reside here, then why do you stay?"

On October 3, 2022, Wolfe joined 104.3 The Fan in Denver as a sports-talk radio host on the station's marquee show, "The Drive."
