= Williamsport, Columbiana County, Ohio =

Williamsport, Ohio
- Unincorporated community
- Location within Ohio Location within the United States
- Coordinates: 40°43′26″N 80°38′09″W
- Country: United States
- State: Ohio
- County: Columbiana
- Township: Madison
- Elevation: 843 ft (257 m)
- Time zone: UTC-5 (Eastern (EST))
  - Summer (DST): UTC-4 (EDT)
- ZIP code: 44432
- Area codes: 330, 234
- GNIS Feature ID: 1061785

Williamsport is an unincorporated community in northwestern Madison Township, Columbiana County, Ohio, United States. The confluence that forms the Little Beaver Creek marks the center of the community.

Williamsport was platted in 1835 by William Crawford, and named for him. An old variant name was Park. A post office called Park was established in 1890, and remained in operation until 1902.
