= St. Clair Township, Columbiana County, Ohio =

Township in Ohio, US

- Township
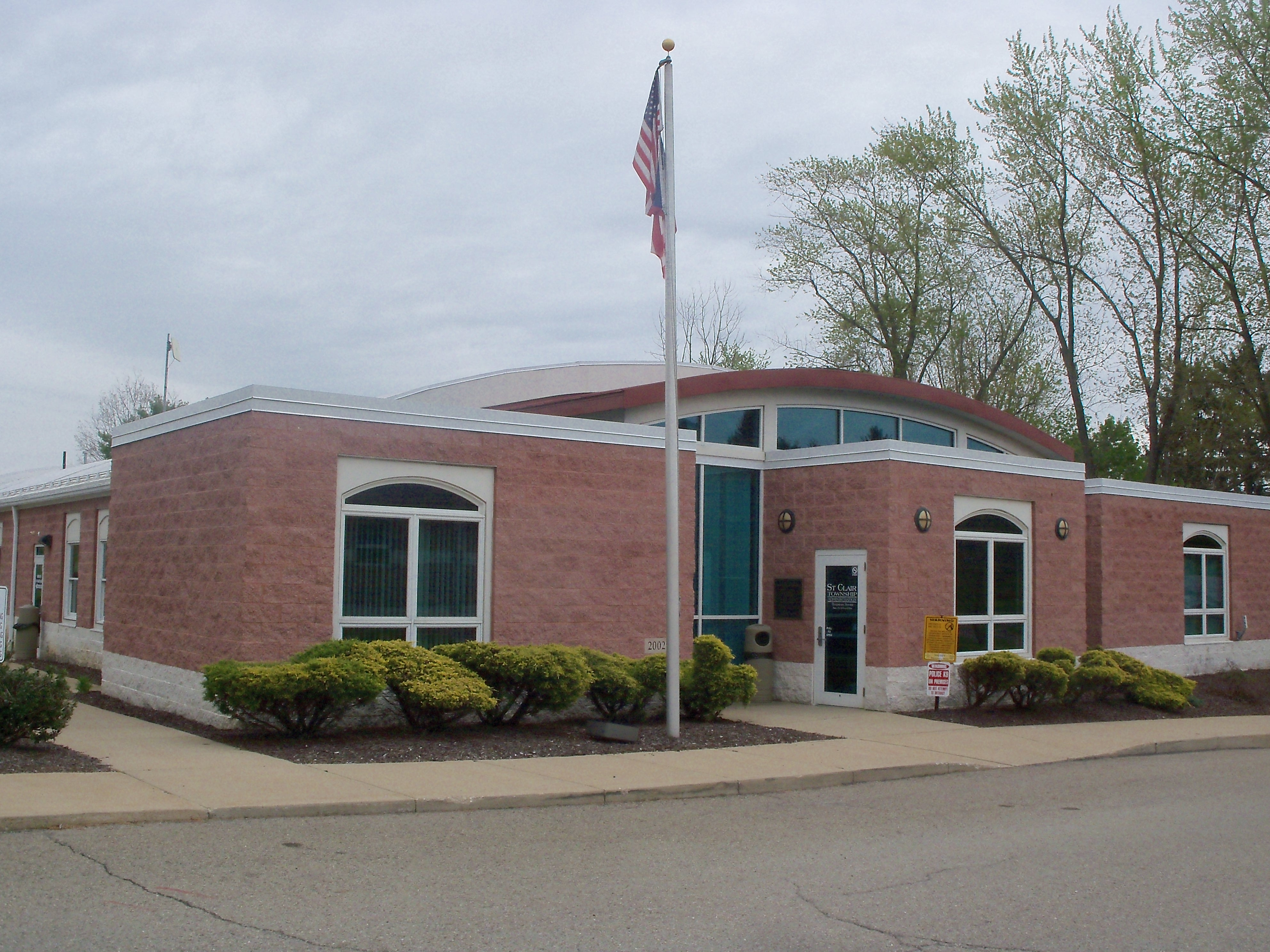
- St. Clair Township Administration Building

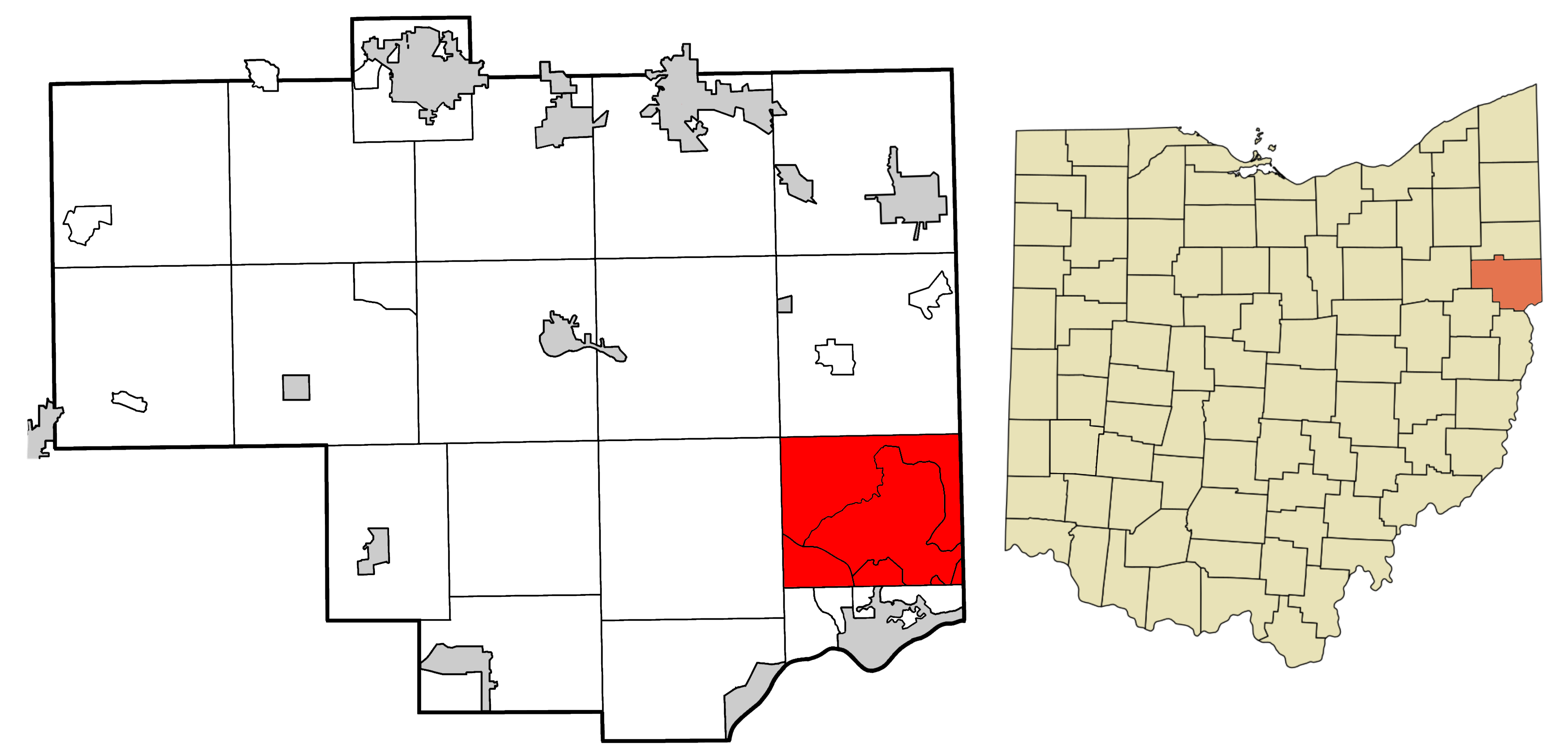
- Location of St. Clair Township in Columbiana County
- Coordinates: 40°40′31″N 80°34′57″W
- Country: United States
- State: Ohio
- County: Columbiana

Government
  - Type: Board of Trustees
  - Chairman: James Sabatini II

Area
  - Total: 29.6 sq mi (76.7 km^{2})
  - Land: 29.5 sq mi (76.3 km^{2})
  - Water: 0.15 sq mi (0.4 km^{2})
- Elevation: 1,150 ft (350 m)

Population (2020)
  - Total: 7,804
  - Density: 265/sq mi (102/km^{2})
- Time zone: UTC-5 (Eastern (EST))
  - Summer (DST): UTC-4 (EDT)
- FIPS code: 39-69512
- GNIS feature ID: 1085901
- Website: http://www.stclairtwp.com/

St. Clair Township is one of the eighteen townships of Columbiana County, Ohio, United States. As of the 2020 census the population was 7,804.

== Geography ==
Located in the southeastern part of the county, it borders the following townships and borough:

- Middleton Township - north
- Ohioville, Pennsylvania - east
- Liverpool Township - south
- Madison Township - west
- Elkrun Township - northwest corner

Two CDPs and one unincorporated community are located in St. Clair Township:

- The census-designated place of Calcutta, in the center
- The census-designated place of Glenmoor, in the southwest
- The unincorporated community of Fredericktown, in the northeast

== Name and history ==
Historical population
Census	Pop.	Note	%±
1980	8,080		—
1990	7,705		−4.6%
2000	7,961		3.3%
2010	7,957		−0.1%
2020	7,804		−1.9%

Statewide, the only other St. Clair Township is located in Butler County.

The township was among the first organized in the county in 1803. It is thought to have been named after Arthur St. Clair, first governor of the Northwest Territory, which included Ohio.

== Parks and recreation ==
Beaver Creek State Forest and a portion of Beaver Creek State Park are located in the township.

== Government ==
The township is governed by a three-member board of trustees, who are elected in November of odd-numbered years to a four-year term beginning on the following January 1. Two are elected in the year after the presidential election and one is elected in the year before it. There is also an elected township fiscal officer, who serves a four-year term beginning on April 1 of the year after the election, which is held in November of the year before the presidential election. Vacancies in the fiscal officership or on the board of trustees are filled by the remaining trustees.

=== Township Trustees ===
- James Sabatini II, Chairman
- Robert Swickard, Vice Chairman
- Jordan G. Williams

=== Fiscal Officer ===
- Deborah Dawson

== Notable people ==
- Jonathan H. Wallace, U.S. Representative from Ohio's 18th district
