= Beaver Creek State Park =

State park in Columbiana County, Ohio, US

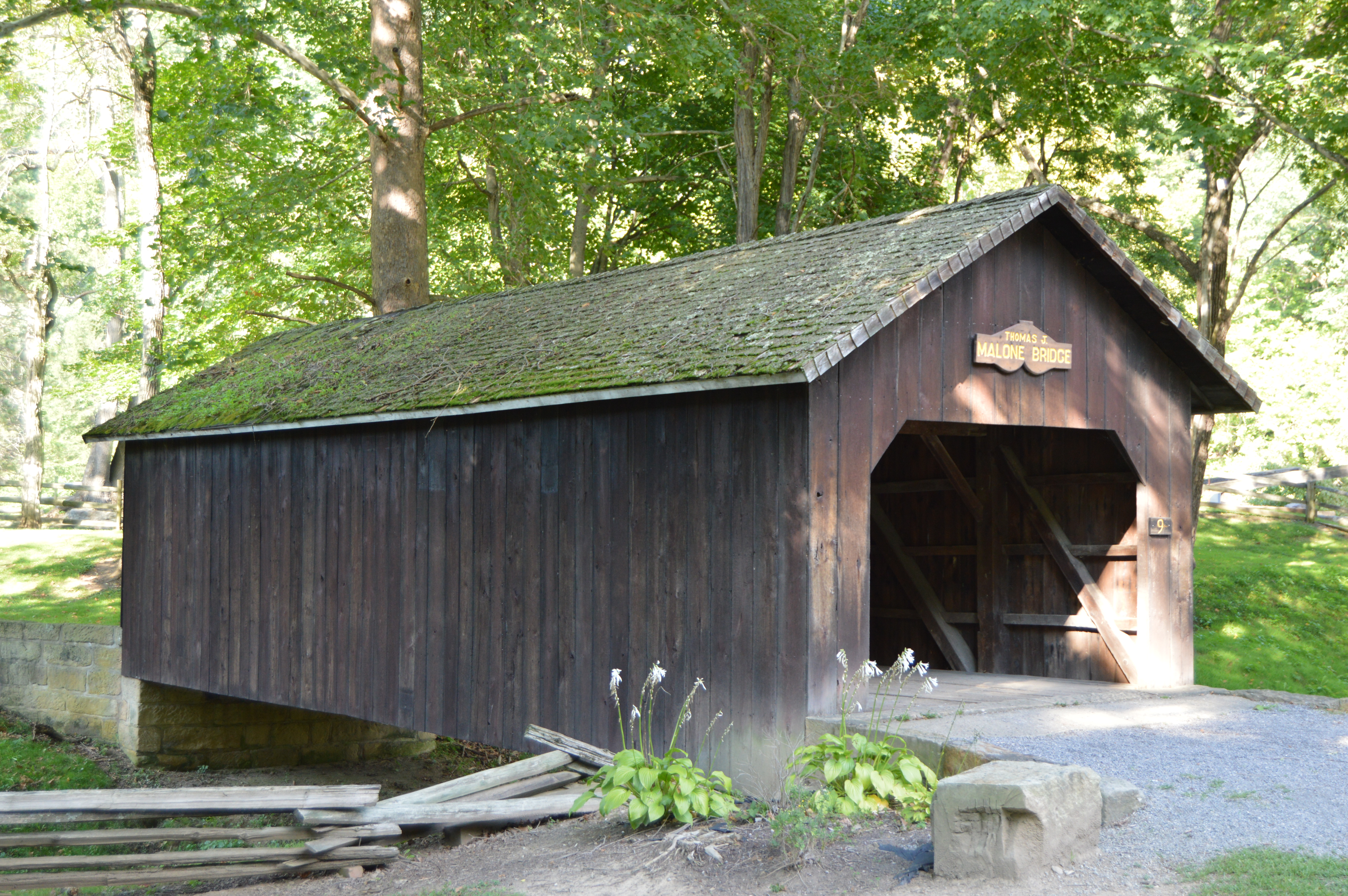
- Thomas J. Malone Covered Bridge

- Location within Ohio Location within the United States
- Interactive map of Beaver Creek State Park
- Location: Columbiana County, Ohio, US
- Nearest city: Calcutta, Ohio
- Coordinates: 40°43′37″N 80°36′45″W
- Area: 2,722 acres (1,102 ha)
- Elevation: 817 ft (249 m)
- Established: 1949
- Administrator: Ohio Department of Natural Resources
- Designation: Ohio state park
- Website: Beaver Creek State Park

Beaver Creek State Park is a 2,722-acre (1,102 ha) public recreation area in Columbiana County, Ohio, United States. The park follows the Little Beaver Creek in the foothills of the Appalachian Mountains. Remnants of the historic Sandy and Beaver Canal, such as Gaston's Mill, can be found throughout the park. It is open for year-round recreation including camping, boating, hunting, fishing and hiking. The North Country National Scenic Trail passes through the park.

== History ==
The history of human habitation in the Beaver Creek area dates back to the Clovis culture, about 10,000 years ago. Archaeological digs nearby have uncovered arrowheads, pottery and knives that date back to these prehistoric Paleoindian people.

The land in and around Beaver Creek State Park was inhabited by various Indian tribes. The last tribe to call the area home before being forced out by the encroachment of Anglo-American settlers in the Ohio Country were the Mingo and Wyandot Indians. A massacre of Mingo leader Logan's family nearby was the catalyst for Dunmore's War.

The first permanent white settler in the area was John Quinn, a trapper who moved into the Little Beaver Creek valley in 1790. He was soon followed by Anglo-American pioneers who cleared the forests and established frontier farms throughout eastern Ohio.

The Sandy and Beaver Canal ran 73 miles (117 km) from the Ohio and Erie Canal at Bolivar, Ohio to the Ohio River at Glasgow, Pennsylvania. It had 90 locks, was chartered in 1828 and completed in 1848. However, the middle section of the canal had many problems from the beginning and fell into disrepair. The canal ceased to operate in 1852, when the Cold Run Reservoir Dam outside of Lisbon, Ohio broke, ruining a large portion of the canal. Remnants of the canal can be found at Beaver Creek State Park.

During the American Civil War, Confederate general and cavalry officer John Hunt Morgan led 2,460 troops past Union lines into Kentucky, Indiana, and Ohio in July 1863 as part of a military campaign called Morgan's Raid. This raid would be the farthest north any uniformed Confederate troops penetrated during the war. The raid ended when Morgan and his men were forced to surrender near what is now Beaver Creek State Park.

Beaver Creek State Park was established in 1949 with the Ohio Department of Natural Resources.

== Attractions ==
Gaston's Mill is a historic mill that was built in 1837 on Little Beaver Creek. It is now restored and is open to the public. The mill is in working condition with various displays of antique milling equipment located within the mill building. The mill works seasonally and grinds whole wheat flour, cornmeal and buckwheat flour.

The historic recreation Pioneer Village features a log home, church, schoolhouse, general store and blacksmith shop, and is next to the mill. The village is open on weekends during the summer season.

The Beaver Creek Wildlife Education Center features small live animals, natural history dioramas, displays of insects, arrowheads and nature photographs, and also houses a gift shop. The center's volunteers offer programs about nature and environmental conservation.

== Ecology ==
Beaver Creek State Park is in the Appalachian Highlands region of Ohio. The hilly sandstone region is home to diverse plant and animal populations. The region contains nearly 70% of the woodlands in Ohio. At one time this same region was a barren wasteland that had been stripped of its old growth forests to provide fuel for the iron furnaces. The forests have since regrown with a diversity of hardwoods including hickory, oak, and maple.

Little Beaver Creek is a state and national wild and scenic river. It flows through the park and creates a gorge in the soft sandstone hills of the park. The walls of the gorge are quite steep with high cliffs over the creek. Little Beaver Creek supports 63 species of fish, 49 mammal species, 140 types of birds and 46 species of reptiles and amphibians, including the rare and protected salamander known as the hellbender.

A variety of animals are found in Beaver Creek State Park. These animals are protected from hunting in the park. They include most common Eastern Woodland creatures such as the white-tailed deer, skunks, wild turkeys, opossums, raccoons, eastern gray squirrels, great horned owls and numerous songbirds, reptiles and amphibians. Plant life at the park includes Dame's violet, goldenrod, spring beauties and asters.

== Recreation ==
Beaver Creek State Park is open for year-round recreation. The park is bisected by Little Beaver Creek which is a cold water fishery. Common game fish include smallmouth and rock bass. Anglers and hunters are required to have a license issued by the state. The creek is open to canoes and rubber rafts. There are 16 miles of trails open to hiking in the park.
