= Fredericktown, Columbiana County, Ohio =

Fredericktown, Ohio
- Unincorporated community
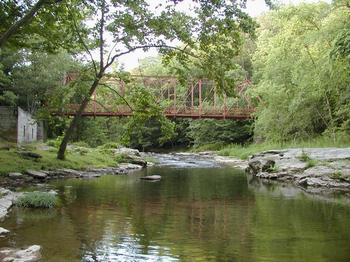
- Little Beaver Creek

- Location within Ohio Location within the United States
- Coordinates: 40°42′50″N 80°32′52″W
- Country: United States
- State: Ohio
- County: Columbiana
- Township: St. Clair
- Elevation: 856 ft (261 m)
- Time zone: UTC-5 (Eastern (EST))
  - Summer (DST): UTC-4 (EDT)
- ZIP code: 43920
- Area codes: 234/330
- GNIS feature ID: 1064681

Fredericktown is an unincorporated community in northeastern St. Clair Township, Columbiana County, Ohio, United States. It is located at the confluence of the north and middle forks of Little Beaver Creek.

== History ==
Fredericktown was laid out in 1833 by George Frederick, and was subsequently named for him. A former variant name was Saint Clair. A post office called Saint Clair operated between 1848 and 1918.

=== Historic sites ===
Despite its small size, Fredericktown has a number of historic buildings. These include an unusual octagonal building which was used variously over the years as a general store, a school and the village post office; two churches (one of which was deconsecrated and is now privately owned); several private homes constructed of locally quarried sandstone; several log cabins; a one-room schoolhouse; a number of barns; and the former Stagecoach Inn, which has been a private home for some years.
