= East Liverpool Junior/Senior High School =

Location
- 100 Maine Boulevard; East Liverpool, Ohio 43920; United States
- Coordinates: 40°37′39″N 80°34′5″W

Information
- Type: Public
- Established: 1851
- School district: East Liverpool City School District
- CEEB code: 362030
- Principal: Dawn Moore
- Teaching staff: 47.00 (Senior); 18.00 (Junior)
- Grades: 7–12
- Student to teacher ratio: 12.30 (Senior); 18.00 (Junior)
- Campus type: Fringe Town
- Colors: Blue and white
- Athletics conference: Buckeye 8 Athletic League; Ohio Valley Athletic Conference
- Team name: Potters
- Yearbook: Keramos
- Website: jrsrhigh.elpotters.school

East Liverpool Junior/Senior High School is a public junior high and high school in East Liverpool, Ohio, United States. It is the only secondary school in the East Liverpool City School District. Athletic teams compete as the East Liverpool Potters in the Ohio High School Athletic Association as a member of the Buckeye 8 Athletic League as well as the Ohio Valley Athletic Conference.

== History ==
The first consolidated high school in East Liverpool was located on East 4th Street in Downtown. This building included a clock tower. The school operated as the main building from 1894 to 1914, and then as a campus school for underclassmen until 1968. After its closure, the building was demolished. Today, a replica clock tower and a small adjoining building have since been built on this site. The building houses the East Liverpool High School Alumni Association.

Built in 1914, the second high school building house upperclassmen from its completion until 1968, when the high school was moved to its current campus. The building was sold to Kent State University in 1968 for $1 and since has been home to Kent State University at East Liverpool. The Memorial Auditorium, built in 1945, is now a YMCA.

In 2010, students from grades 7 and 8 were moved into the building from East Liverpool Middle School (now Westgate Middle School).

== Campus ==
East Liverpool High School is located on a hill off of the city's Maine Boulevard via the school's driveway, dubbed "Potter Pride Drive".

ELHS consists of three buildings. The main building houses most of the classes, the office, and cafeteria. At the other end of the parking lot is the vocational building, where some of the career tech classes are located. Adjacent to the main building and also across from the vocational building is the Potter Fieldhouse. Here, the school's gymnasium, auditorium, and band room are located, as well as a few classrooms. Additionally, North Elementary School is located past the fieldhouse on campus.

== Academics ==
According to the National Center for Education Statistics, in 2019, the school reported an enrollment of 557 pupils in grades 9th through 12th and 324 students in grades 7th and 8th, with 808 pupils eligible for a federal free or reduced-price lunch. The school employed 67 teachers, yielding a student–teacher ratio of 12.38 for Senior High and 14.73 for Junior High. East Liverpool High School offers courses in the traditional American curriculum. Entering their third and fourth years, students can elect to attend the Columbiana County Career and Technical Center in Lisbon as either a part-time or full-time student.

== Athletics ==
=== Athletic facilities ===
Patterson Field is located in the West End and is home to varsity and junior varsity football. The Potter Fieldhouse, located near the high school on Potter Pride Drive, houses the gymnasium where basketball and volleyball games, as well as wrestling meets, take place. The Frank J. Mangano Memorial Olympic Track is located down the hill from ELHS and the Fieldhouse and is home to track meets, freshman football games, soccer games, and some band practices. There is also a baseball field on campus. Off-campus facilities include Thompson Park for softball, Walnut Lanes in downtown East Liverpool for bowling, the Calcutta YMCA for swim, and Turkana Golf Course in Calcutta for golf.

== Notable people ==
=== Alumni ===
- Bernie Allen, former professional baseball player in Major League Baseball
- Less Browne, former professional football player in the United States Football League and Canadian Football League
- John Caparulo, stand-up comedian
- Lou Holtz, college football coach and television analyst
- Josh Stansbury, professional mixed martial artist in the Ultimate Fighting Championship

=== Faculty ===
- Bill Eadie, professional wrestler best known under the ring name "Ax"
