= Liverpool Township, Columbiana County, Ohio =

Township in Ohio, US

- Township
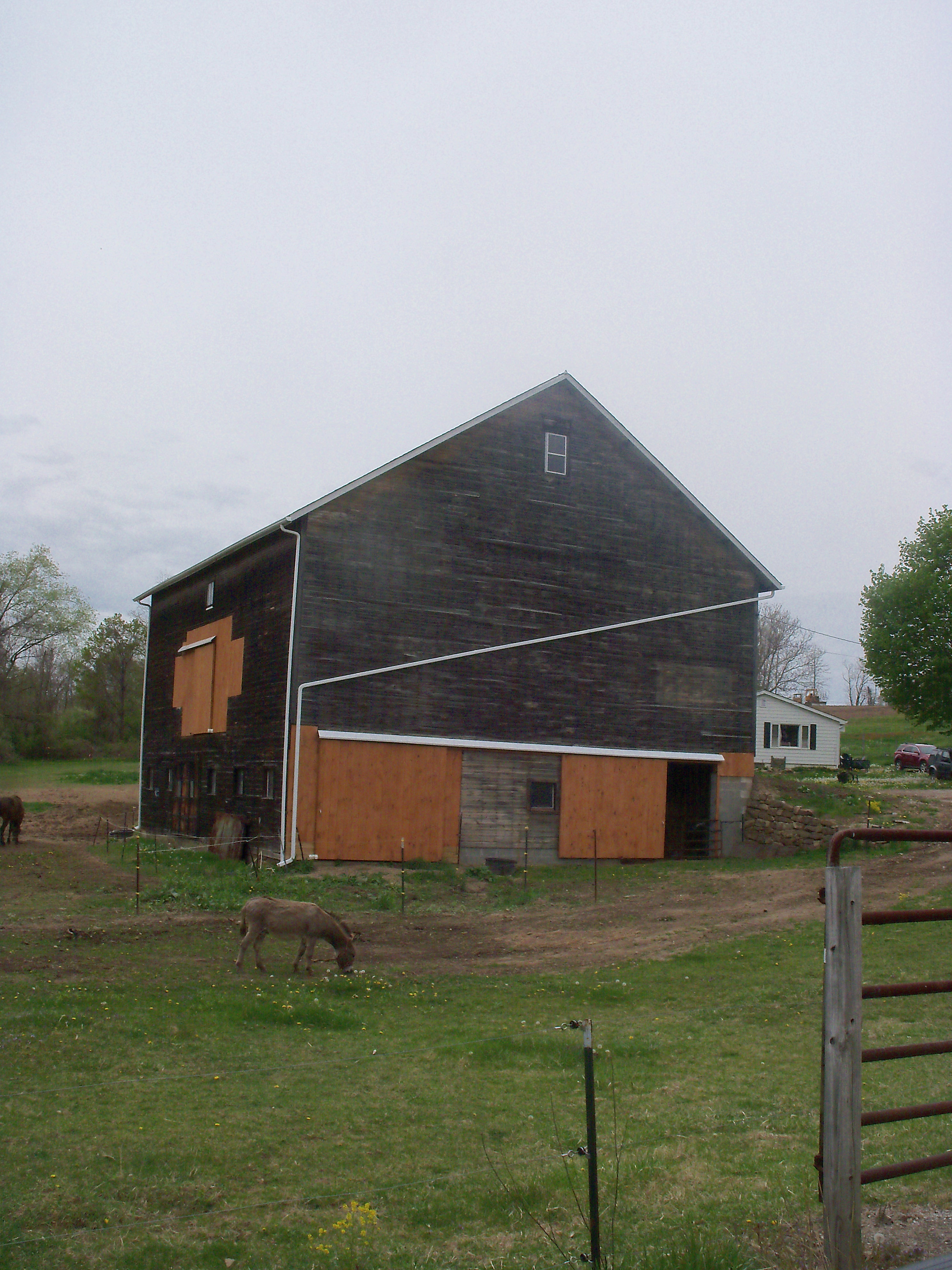
- Donkeys graze outside this barn on Shadyside Avenue

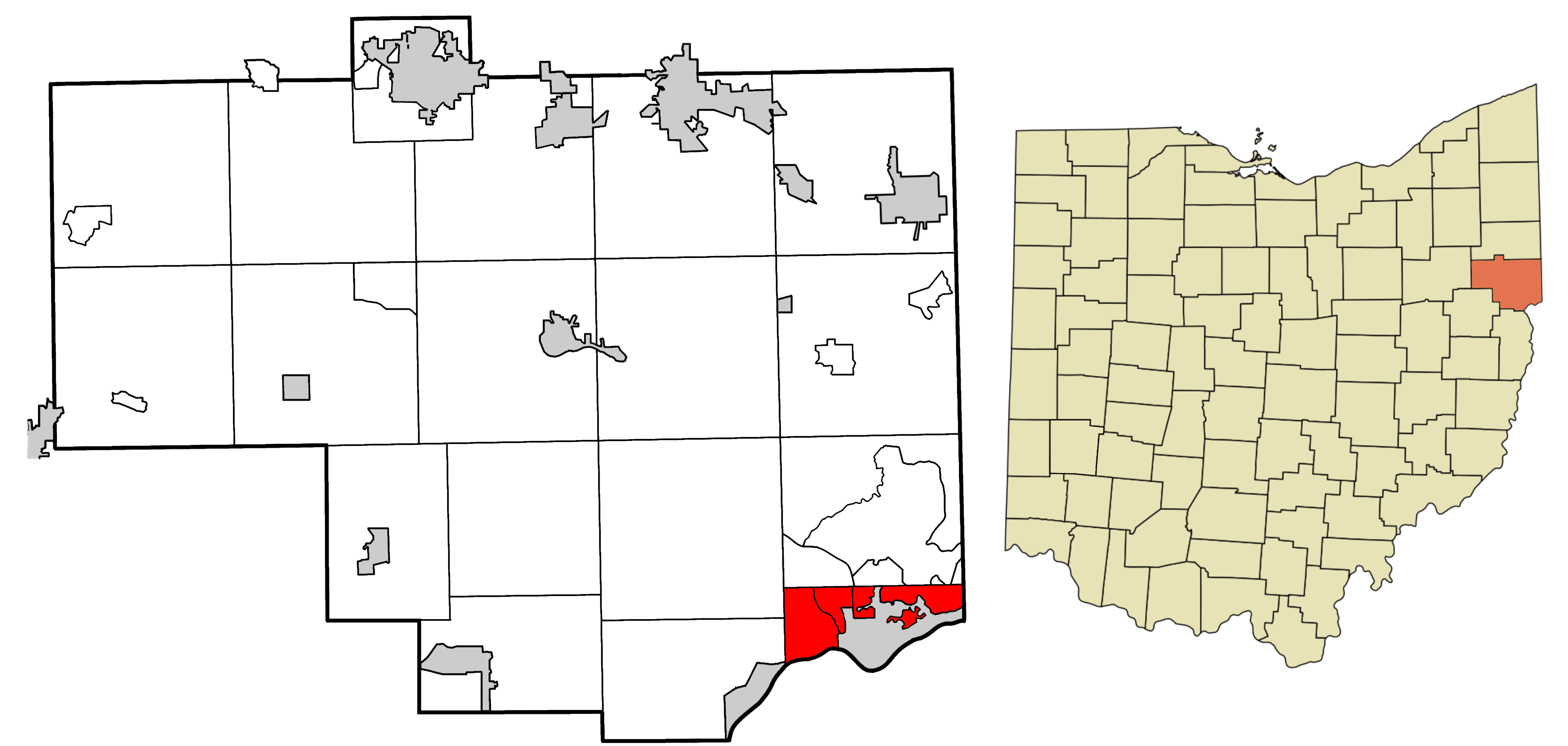
- Location of Liverpool Township in Columbiana County
- Coordinates: 40°38′28″N 80°34′55″W
- Country: United States
- State: Ohio
- County: Columbiana

Area
  - Total: 7.5 sq mi (19.3 km^{2})
  - Land: 7.4 sq mi (19.1 km^{2})
  - Water: 0.077 sq mi (0.2 km^{2})
- Elevation: 1,168 ft (356 m)

Population (2020)
  - Total: 3,862
  - Density: 524/sq mi (202/km^{2})
- Time zone: UTC-5 (Eastern (EST))
  - Summer (DST): UTC-4 (EDT)
- FIPS code: 39-44226
- GNIS feature ID: 1085897
- Website: https://liverpooltownship.com/

Liverpool Township is one of the eighteen townships of Columbiana County, Ohio, United States. As of the 2020 census the population was 3,862.

== Geography ==
Located in the southeastern corner of the county along the Ohio River, it borders the following townships and borough:

- St. Clair Township - north
- Ohioville, Pennsylvania - east
- Greene Township, Beaver County, Pennsylvania - southeast corner, across the Ohio River
- Hancock County, West Virginia - south, across the Ohio River
- Yellow Creek Township - southwest
- Madison Township - northwest

One city and one CDP are located in Liverpool Township:

- The city of East Liverpool, in the south
- The census-designated place of La Croft, in the northwest

== Name and history ==
Historical population
Census	Pop.	Note	%±
1980	4,921		—
1990	4,746		−3.6%
2000	4,374		−7.8%
2010	4,047		−7.5%
2020	3,862		−4.6%

Statewide, the only other Liverpool Township is located in Medina County.

The township was organized in 1834, the last in the county to be erected.

== Government ==
The township is governed by a three-member board of trustees, who are elected in November of odd-numbered years to a four-year term beginning on the following January 1. Two are elected in the year after the presidential election and one is elected in the year before it. There is also an elected township fiscal officer, who serves a four-year term beginning on April 1 of the year after the election, which is held in November of the year before the presidential election. Vacancies in the fiscal officership or on the board of trustees are filled by the remaining trustees.

=== Township Trustees ===
- Mike Bahen, Chairman
- Dennis Giambroni, Vice Chairman
- Keith H. Burke

=== Fiscal Officer ===
- Shirley Flati
