= Madison Township, Columbiana County, Ohio =

Township in Ohio, US

- Township
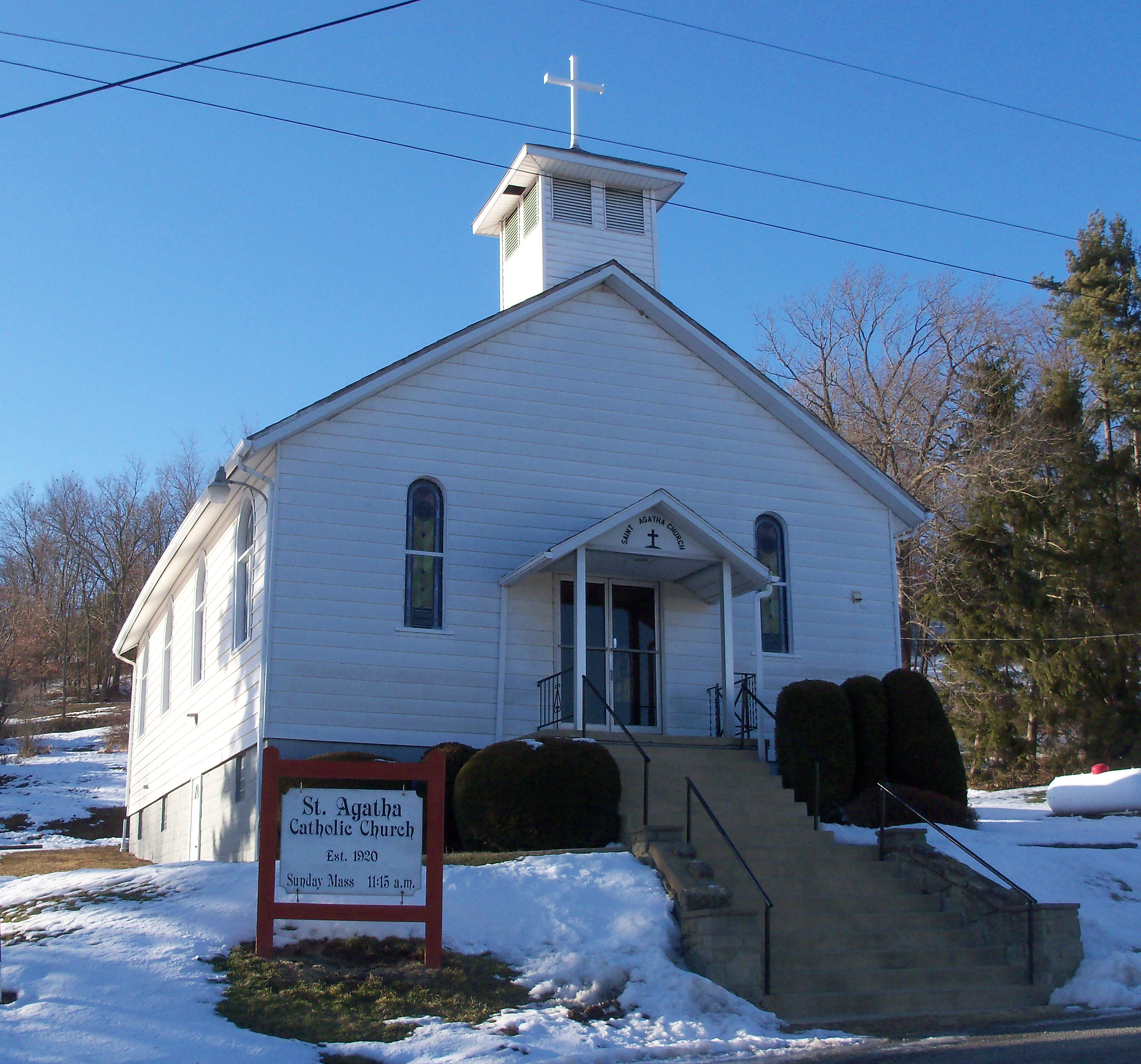
- Church in West Point

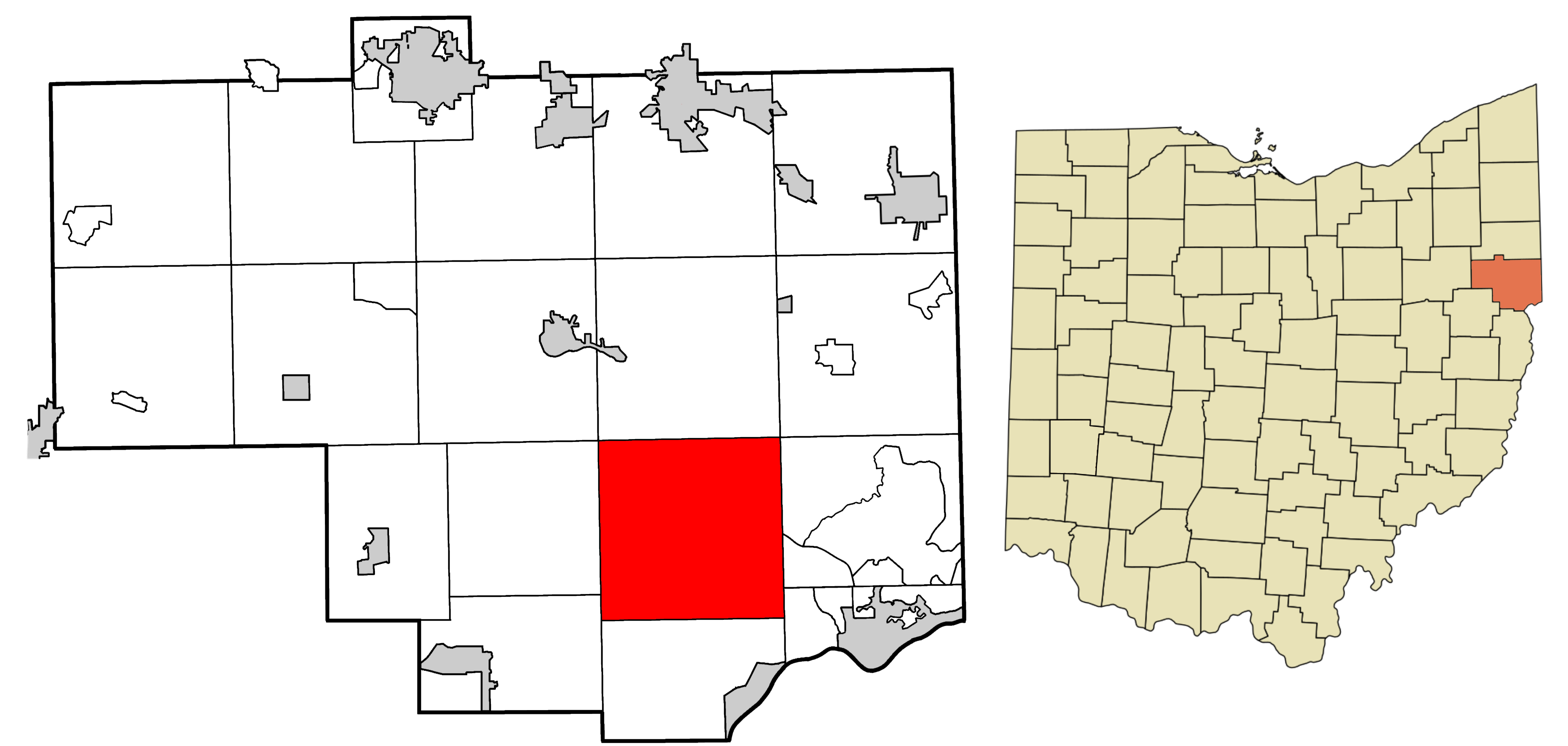
- Location of Madison Township in Columbiana County
- Coordinates: 40°41′18″N 80°41′9″W
- Country: United States
- State: Ohio
- County: Columbiana

Area
  - Total: 35.7 sq mi (92.4 km^{2})
  - Land: 35.6 sq mi (92.3 km^{2})
  - Water: 0.039 sq mi (0.1 km^{2})
- Elevation: 1,165 ft (355 m)

Population (2020)
  - Total: 2,922
  - Density: 82.0/sq mi (31.7/km^{2})
- Time zone: UTC-5 (Eastern (EST))
  - Summer (DST): UTC-4 (EDT)
- FIPS code: 39-46368
- GNIS feature ID: 1085898

Madison Township is one of the eighteen townships of Columbiana County, Ohio, United States. As of the 2020 census the population was 2,922.

== Geography ==
Located in the southeastern part of the county, it borders the following townships:

- Elkrun Township - north
- Middleton Township - northeast corner
- St. Clair Township - east
- Liverpool Township - southeast
- Yellow Creek Township - south
- Washington Township - southwest
- Wayne Township - west
- Center Township - northwest corner

One unincorporated community is located in Madison Township:

- The unincorporated community of West Point, in the north

== Name and history ==
Historical population
Census	Pop.	Note	%±
1980	3,387		—
1990	3,385		−0.1%
2000	3,406		0.6%
2010	3,196		−6.2%
2020	2,922		−8.6%

It is one of twenty Madison Townships statewide. The township was organized in 1809.

== Government ==
The township is governed by a three-member board of trustees, who are elected in November of odd-numbered years to a four-year term beginning on the following January 1. Two are elected in the year after the presidential election and one is elected in the year before it. There is also an elected township fiscal officer, who serves a four-year term beginning on April 1 of the year after the election, which is held in November of the year before the presidential election. Vacancies in the fiscal officership or on the board of trustees are filled by the remaining trustees.

=== Township Trustees ===
- Dwayne Nickel, Chairman
- Chris Kelly,
- Bruce R. Barrett Vice Chairman

=== Fiscal Officer ===
- Tiffany Chetock
