= Little Beaver Creek =

Stream in Ohio, United States

Coordinates: 40.6428°N 80.5120°W

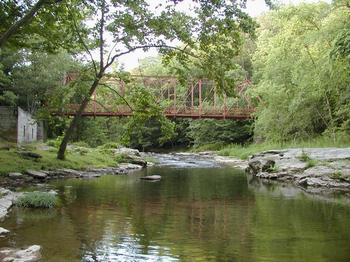
- Little Beaver Creek as it passes through Fredericktown, Ohio

Physical characteristics
- Source
  - location: Confluence of Middle and West Forks at Williamsport, Ohio
  - elevation: 840 ft (260 m)
- Mouth
  - location: Ohio River at Glasgow, Pennsylvania
  - elevation: 665 ft (203 m)
- Basin size: 605 mi^{2} (1,570 km^{2})

National Wild and Scenic Rivers System
- Type: Scenic
- Designated: October 23, 1975

Little Beaver Creek is a wild and scenic area in Ohio. The Little Beaver Creek watershed is located primarily in Columbiana County in eastern Ohio, and in portions of Carroll County, Mahoning County, and western Pennsylvania, draining approximately 605 mi² (1,567 km²), of which 503 mi² (1,303 km²) are in Ohio. The watershed in total size covers an area of approximately 510 square miles, with about 80% of this being situated in Ohio. The great majority of land within the watershed is privately owned. Within the watershed are roughly 808 miles of linear streams.

The creek is protected by a number of classifications, including Ohio Wild and Scenic River and National Scenic River, as well as being part of Ohio's state park system. It is the only major river in Ohio to have dual State Wild and Scenic and National Scenic River designations, and was the first in the country to earn both distinctions. The creek empties into the Ohio River just east of East Liverpool, Ohio. The now-defunct Sandy and Beaver Canal was constructed alongside the creek.

According to an Ohio Department of Natural Resources study conducted in 2004, Little Beaver Creek is an exceptionally clean waterway with a highly diverse ecosystem. It supports 63 species of fish, 49 mammal species, 270 species of migratory and resident birds and 46 species of reptiles and amphibians, including the rare and protected salamander known as the hellbender. It is thought to be the only riparian corridor in the United States which shows geologic evidence of all five ice ages.

Little Beaver Creek has several forks, which lead generally in a southern and easterly direction. The North Fork and Middle Forks of the creek join in confluence at Laurel Point in the unincorporated village of Fredericktown, Ohio. From here the creek flows down to the Ohio River.

The Little Beaver Creek watershed is home to Beaver Creek State Forest, Beaver Creek State Park, and Sheepskin Hollow State Nature Preserve.

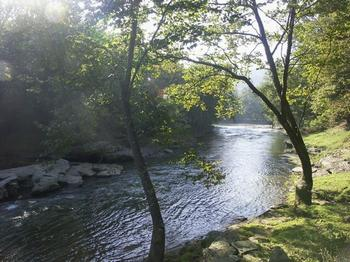

== Name ==
Little Beaver Creek is an English translation of the original Native American name.

According to the Geographic Names Information System, the Little Beaver Creek has also been known as:

- Beaver Creek
- Little Beaver River
- Middle Fork Beaver Creek
- Little Beaver Creek
- The Tubs

== See also ==
- List of rivers of Ohio
