= Galbreath =

Galbreath is a surname of Scottish origin meaning foreign Briton. Notable people with the surname include:

- Asher A. Galbreath (1864–1935), American politician, educator, businessman
- Charles Galbreath (1925–2013), American politician and jurist
- Charles Burleigh Galbreath (1858–1934), American writer, historian, State Librarian of Ohio
- Frank Galbreath (1913–1971), American jazz trumpeter
- Harry Galbreath (born 1965), American professional football player
- JJ Galbreath (born 2001), American football player
- John W. Galbreath (1897–1988), American horseman and philanthropist
- Louis H. Galbreath (1861–1899), American educator and football coach
- Tony Galbreath (born 1954), American professional football player

== See also ==
- Galbraith
