= Ohio State Route 558 =

State highway in Columbiana County, Ohio, US

State Route 558

Route information
- Maintained by ODOT
- Length: 15.74 mi (25.33 km)
- Existed: 1938–present

Major junctions
- West end: SR 45 near Salem
- SR 7 / SR 517 near Rogers
- East end: SR 46 / SR 170 in East Palestine

Location
- Country: United States
- State: Ohio
- Counties: Columbiana

Highway system
- Ohio State Highway System; Interstate; US; State; Scenic
← SR 557	→ SR 559

State Route 558 (SR 558) is a 15.74-mile (25.33 km) state route that runs between Salem and East Palestine in the US state of Ohio. Most of the route is a rural two-lane highway and passes through farmland, woodland and residential properties.

The highway was first signed in 1937 on much the same alignment as today. SR 558 replaced the SR 154 designation of the highway which dated back to 1923; SR 194 ran between Lisbon and East Palestine. Some of the highway was paved in 1937, with the rest of the route being paved by 1961.

== Route description ==
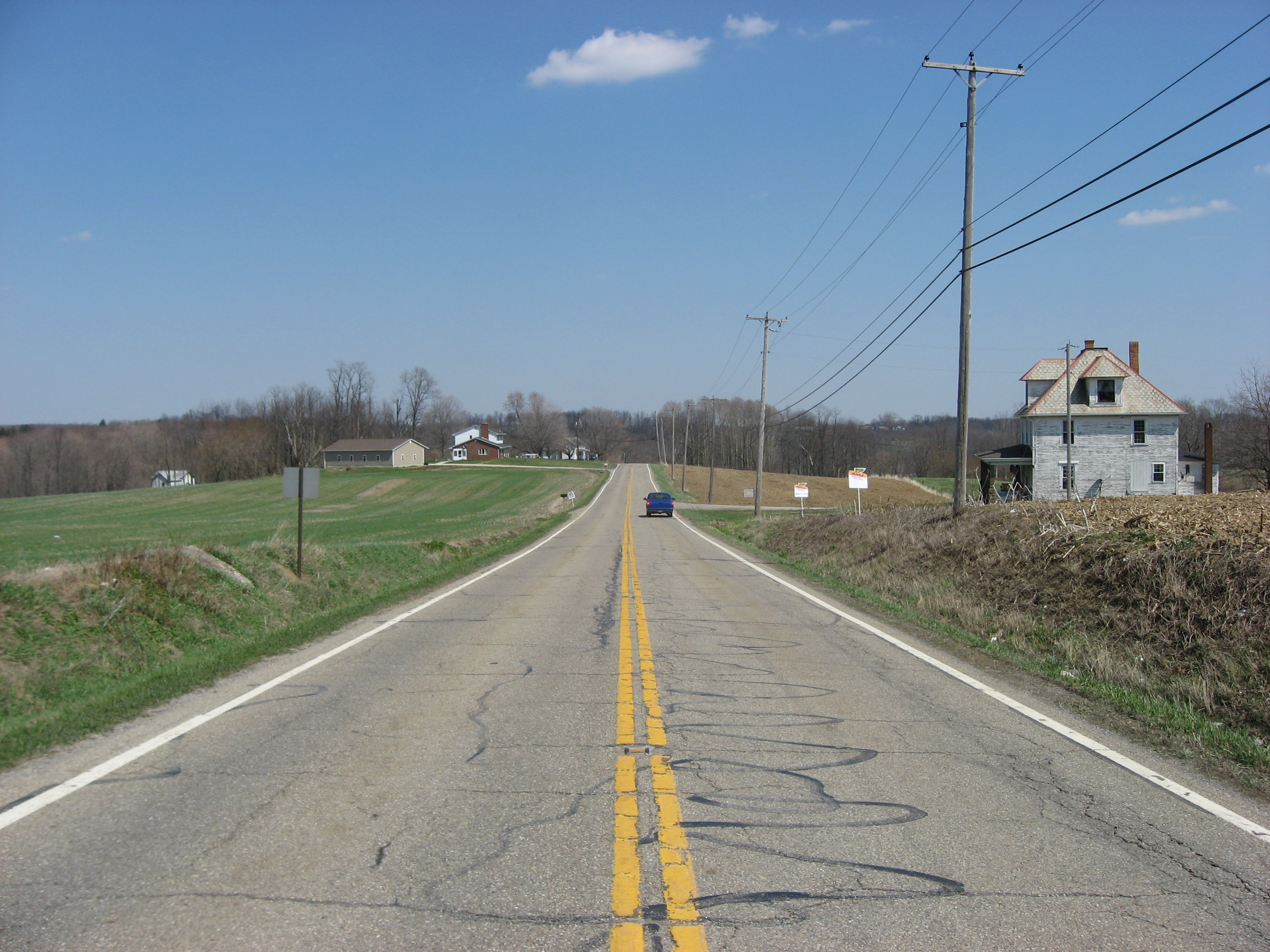
SR 558 in Unity Township

SR 558 begins at an intersection with SR 45, in rural Columbiana County. The route heads northeast as a two-lane highway, passing through woodland. The road makes a sharp curve due east passing through woodland and farmland. The highway turns southeast and enters Franklin Square. In Franklin Square the route passes through residential properties. SR 558 has an intersection with SR 164 in rural Fairfield Township. After SR 164, SR 558 crosses over SR 11, without any access. The route continues southeast passing through woodland, with houses. The road has an intersection with SR 517. This intersection is the western end of the concurrency between SR 517 and SR 558.

The concurrency heads east and enters East Fairfield. In East Fairfield the highway passes through commercial properties and has an intersection with SR 7. The intersection with SR 7 is the eastern terminus of SR 517. East of SR 7, the route passes through residential, before leaving East Fairfield. The highway curves northeast passing through woodland and farmland. The route has an intersection with SR 46. This intersection is the western end of the SR 46 and SR 558 concurrency. The two routes head southeast, before curving northeast. The concurrency parallel Norfolk Southern Railroad tracks. The route heads east-northeast entering East Palestine. The highway passes through residential properties, heading towards downtown East Palestine. In downtown the route has a traffic signal at SR 170. This traffic signal is the eastern terminus of SR 558, it is also the southern terminus of SR 46.

SR 558 is not part of the National Highway System, a system of routes important to the nation's economy, mobility and defense. The highway is maintained by the Ohio Department of Transportation (ODOT). ODOT's 2009 annual average daily traffic (AADT) calculations showed that the lowest traffic levels were present on a section of roadway at the western terminus, where only 740 vehicles used the highway daily; the peak traffic volume was 3,990 vehicles AADT along a section of SR 558 that is concurrent with SR 46.

== History ==
A section of SR 558 was first signed as SR 154 in 1923, on a route between East Fairfield and East Palestine. In 1926, SR 154 was rerouted along its current routing; decommissioning the current route of SR 558. In 1937, SR 558 was established between SR 45 and East Palestine. In this year the road was also paved between East Fairfield and East Palestine. Between 1953 and 1955 the road was paved between Salem and SR 164. The final section of roadway, between SR 164 and East Fairfield, was paved between 1959 and 1961. Between 1979 and 1981, the route was rerouted to the south along some of the former SR 344. No significant changes have taken place to this state route since 1981.

== Major intersections ==
The entire route is in Columbiana County.

Location	mi	km	Destinations	Notes
Salem Township	0.00	0.00	SR 45	
Fairfield Township	4.94	7.95	SR 164	
Fairfield Township	10.15	16.33	SR 517 west	Western end of SR 517 concurrency
Fairfield Township	10.47	16.85	SR 7 / SR 517 end	Eastern end of SR 517 concurrency; northern terminus of SR 517
Unity Township	12.56	20.21	SR 46 north	Western end of SR 46 concurrency
East Palestine	15.74	25.33	SR 46 end / SR 170	Southern terminus of SR 46
1.000 mi = 1.609 km; 1.000 km = 0.621 mi: Concurrency terminus
