= Galbraith =

- Pronunciation: UK: /ɡælˈbreɪθ/ US: /ˈɡælbreɪθ/
- Language: English

Origin
- Language: Scottish Gaelic

The surname Galbraith is derived from the Gaelic elements gall, meaning "stranger", and Breathnach, meaning "Briton". As such, the surname can be taken to mean "British foreigner", "British Scandinavian", "foreign Briton", or "stranger-Briton". The surname Galbraith can be rendered in Scottish Gaelic as Mac a' Bhreatannaich.

The surname is borne by members of Clan Galbraith. The clan is known in Gaelic as Clann a' Bhreatannaich. The earliest recorded chief of this family may be "Gillcrist Bretnach", a man attested in 1193. This man's name could indicate that he was either of Welsh or North British ancestry.

Early examples of forms of the surname include: "Gillescop Galbrad" in 1208×1214; "Gillescop Galbrath" in 1208×1214; "Gillescop Gallebrad" in 1208×1214; "Wilielmo filio Arthuri filii Galbrait" in 1239; "Gillaspec Galbraith" in 1208×1241; and "Mauritio filio Gillaspic Galbraith" in 1208×1265.

== People ==
- Alastair Galbraith (musician), (born 1965) musician from Dunedin, New Zealand
- Catherine G Galbraith, American expert in cell migration and super-resolution microscopy
- Clare Calbraith (born 1974), English actor
- Clinton A. Galbraith (1860–1923), American lawyer and judge
- Daniel Galbraith (Ontario politician) (1813–1879) Scottish-Canadian farmer and politician
- Daniel Harcourt Galbraith (1878–1968), Canadian provincial politician
- Daniel Murray Bayne Galbraith (1895–1921), World War I flying ace
- Danny Galbraith (born 1990), Scottish footballer
- Declan Galbraith (born 1991), British singer
- Douglas Galbraith (1965–2018), Scottish historical novelist
- Evan Griffith Galbraith (1928–2008), United States diplomat
- Francis Joseph Galbraith (1913–1986), United States diplomat
- Frederick W. Galbraith (1874–1921), American businessman; second national commander of The American Legion (1920–1921)
- Gatewood Galbraith (1947–2012), a Kentucky lawyer, author and politician
- George Galbraith (born 1955), Danish ice hockey goaltender and coach
- George Galbraith (priest) (died 1911), Dean of Derry
- Georgie Starbuck Galbraith (1909–1980), American poet
- Jack Galbraith, former Scottish footballer
- James Galbraith (Canadian politician) (born 1940), Canadian Progressive Conservative politician
- James K. Galbraith (born 1952), United States economist, son of John Kenneth Galbraith
- Jo-Ann Galbraith (born 1985), Australian archer
- John Kenneth Galbraith (1908–2006), Canadian-born American economist
- Lettice Galbraith (1859–1932), ghost story writer
- Marie Galbraith (1946–2022), American politician
- Neil Galbraith, Australian curler
- Patrick Galbraith (born 1967), United States professional tennis player
- Patrick Galbraith (ice hockey) (born 1986), Danish professional ice hockey goaltender
- Paul Galbraith, (born 1964), Scottish-born classical guitarist
- Peter W. Galbraith (born 1950), United States diplomat and commentator, son of John Kenneth Galbraith
- Robert Galbraith, (born 1965), pen name of J.K. Rowling; writer of "The Cuckoo's Calling"
- Sam Galbraith (1945–2014), Scottish Labour Party politician
- Sheldon Galbraith (1922–2015), Canadian figure skating coach
- Tam Galbraith (1917–1982), Scottish Conservative and Unionist politician
- Thomas Dunlop Galbraith, 1st Baron Strathclyde (1891–1985), British politician
- Thomas Galbraith, 2nd Baron Strathclyde (born 1960), British Conservative Party politician
- Thomas J. Galbraith (mid-19th century), United States politician
- Vivian Hunter Galbraith, British historian
- W. R. Galbraith, (mid-late 19th century) Civil engineer in the United Kingdom
- Walter Galbraith (1918–1995), Scottish football player and manager

== See also ==
- Galbraith, Iowa, a community in the United States
- 4089 Galbraith, an asteroid
- Clan Galbraith, a Scottish clan
- Galbraith Mountain, local name for North Lookout Mountain near Bellingham, Washington
- Galbraith supermarkets
- Galbreath

== Citations ==
=== Primary sources ===
- Cartularium Comitatus de Levanax. Edinburgh: Maitland Club. 1833. hdl:2027/mdp.39015070200798.
- "Document 3/14/1". People of Medieval Scotland, 1093–1371. n.d.
- "Document 3/17/2". People of Medieval Scotland, 1093–1371. n.d.
- "Document 3/17/3". People of Medieval Scotland, 1093–1371. n.d.
- "Document 3/17/8". People of Medieval Scotland, 1093–1371. n.d.
- "Document 3/17/17". People of Medieval Scotland, 1093–1371. n.d.
- "Document 3/17/29". People of Medieval Scotland, 1093–1371. n.d.
- "Document 3/17/30". People of Medieval Scotland, 1093–1371. n.d.
- Liber Sancte Marie de Melrose: Munimenta Vetustiora Monasterii Cisterciensis de Melros. Vol. 1. Edinburgh: Bannatyne Club. 1837. OL 24829686M.
- Registrum Episcopatus Glasguensis. Vol. 1. Edinburgh. 1843. OL 14037534M.
- Registrum Monasterii de Passelet, Cartas Privilegia Conventiones Aliaque Munimenta Complectens, A Domo Fundata A.D. MCLXIII Usque Ad A.D. MDXXIX. Edinburgh. 1832. OL 24829867M.

=== Secondary sources ===
- Black, GF (1971) [1946]. The Surnames of Scotland: Their Origin, Meaning, and History. New York: The New York Public Library. ISBN 0-87104-172-3. OL 8346130M.
- Broun, D (2004). "The Welsh Identity of the Kingdom of Strathclyde c.900–c.1200". The Innes Review. 55 (2): 111–180. doi:10.3366/inr.2004.55.2.111. eISSN 1745-5219. ISSN 0020-157X.
- Clarkson, T (2010). The Men of the North: The Britons and Southern Scotland (EPUB). Edinburgh: John Donald. ISBN 978-1-907909-02-3.
- Hanks, P; Coates, R; McClure, P, eds. (2016). The Oxford Dictionary of Family Names in Britain and Ireland. Vol. 2. Oxford: Oxford University Press. ISBN 978-0-19-879882-8.
- Hanks, P; Hodges, F (1991) [1988]. A Dictionary of Surnames. Oxford: Oxford University Press. ISBN 0-10-211502-8. OL 2044914M.
- "Galbraith Family History". Ancestry.com. n.d.
- Mark, C (2003). The Gaelic-English Dictionary. New York: Routledge. ISBN 0-203-27706-6.
- Reaney, PH (1995). Wilson, RM (ed.). A Dictionary of English Surnames (3rd ed.). Oxford: Oxford University Press. ISBN 0-19-8631464.
