= Ohio State Route 45 =

State highway in northeastern Ohio, US

State Route 45
- Route of SR 45 highlighted in red

Route information
- Maintained by ODOT
- Length: 96.56 mi (155.40 km)
- Existed: 1924–present

Major junctions
- South end: SR 7 / SR 39 in Wellsville
- US 30 near Lisbon; US 62 / SR 14 near Salem; US 224 in Ellsworth; US 422 in Warren; US 322 in Orwell; US 6 in Rome; I-90 near Ashtabula; US 20 near Ashtabula
- North end: SR 531 near Ashtabula

Location
- Country: United States
- State: Ohio
- Counties: Columbiana, Mahoning, Trumbull, Ashtabula

Highway system
- Ohio State Highway System; Interstate; US; State; Scenic
← SR 44	→ SR 46

State Route 45 (SR 45) is a north–south state highway in the northeastern portion of the U.S. state of Ohio. Its southern terminus is at the State Route 7/State Route 39 concurrency in Wellsville, and its northern terminus is at State Route 531 about three miles (4.8 km) west of Ashtabula.

== History ==
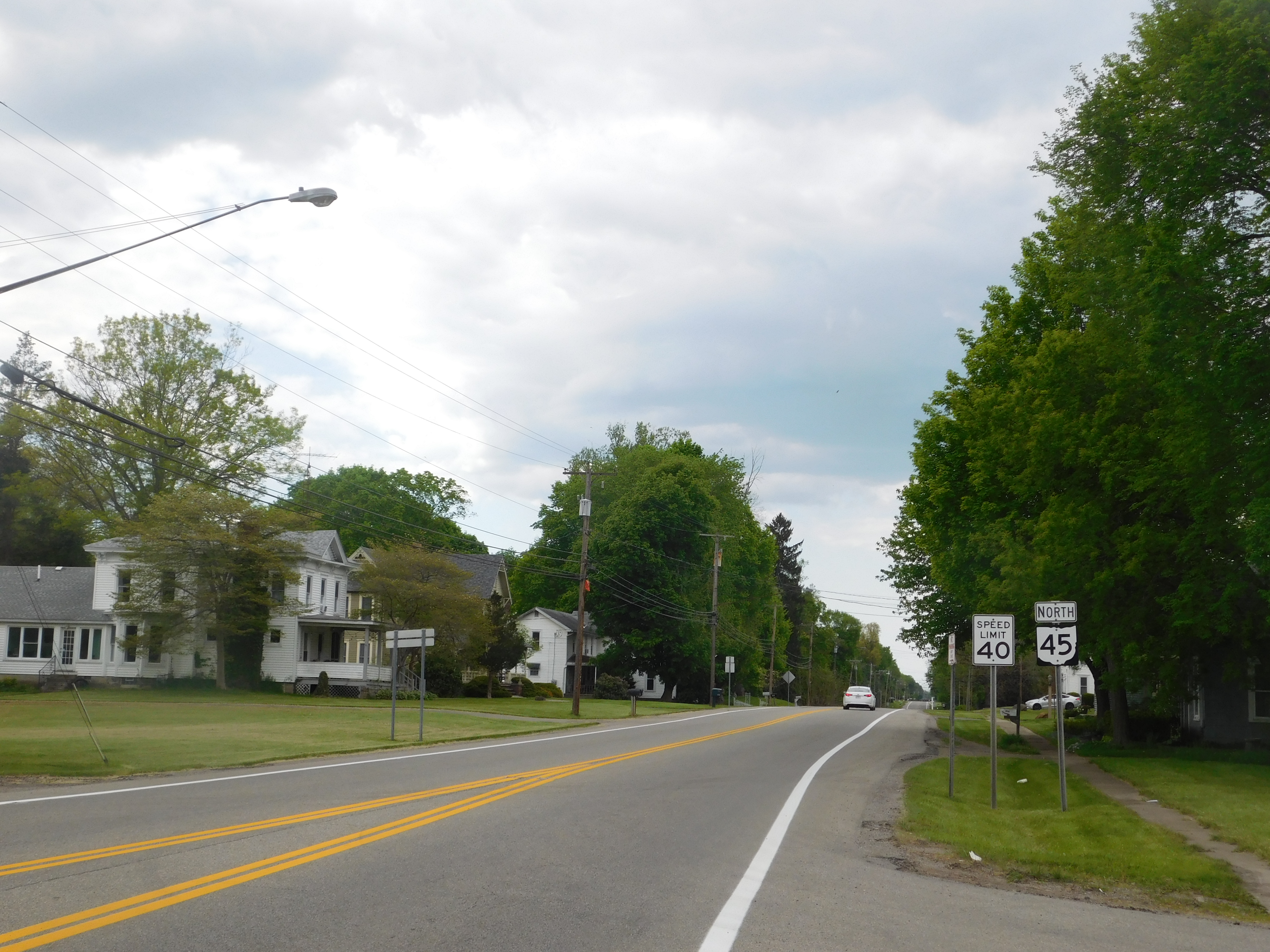
SR 45 northbound in Bristolville

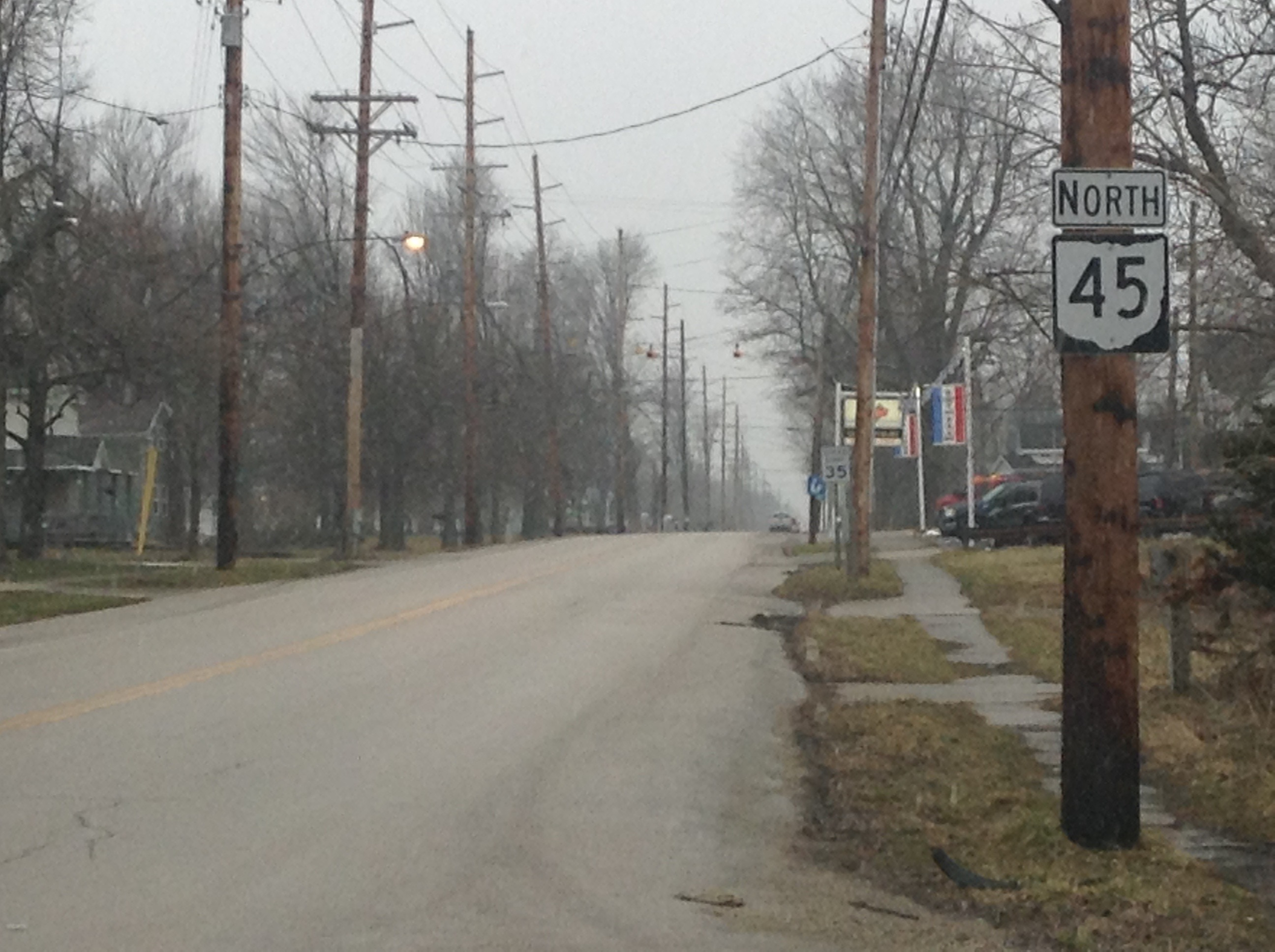
Route 45 in Rock Creek, Ashtabula

- 1924 – Original route established; originally routed from Lisbon to Geneva along its current route from Lisbon to 1½ miles south of Salem, from 1½ miles south of Salem to 1½ miles north of Salem on a currently unnumbered road, along its current route from 1½ miles north of Salem to North Bloomfield, from North Bloomfield to Windsor on a currently unnumbered road, and from Windsor to Geneva along current State Route 534.
- 1931 – By this time, rerouted from North Bloomfield to Orwell along a previously unnumbered road, and from Orwell to Windsor along U.S. Route 322; original routing from North Bloomfield to Windsor decertified.
- 1932 – Extended to Wellsville along the former alignment of State Route 153 from Wellsville to West Point, and along U.S. Route 30 (formerly State Route 5 before 1926) from West Point to Lisbon.
- 1938 – Rerouted north from Orwell to its current northern terminus; former alignment from Windsor to Geneva certified as State Route 534.
- 1976 – Routed around Salem on newly completed bypass (southwest portion completed in 1972; bypass certified as State Route 45B in 1974).
- 1997 – From Lisbon to State Route 558 upgraded to divided highway.

== Major intersections ==
County	Location	mi	km	Destinations	Notes
Columbiana	Wellsville	0.00– 0.47	0.00– 0.76	SR 7 / SR 39 – East Liverpool, Steubenville	Interchange
Columbiana	Madison Township	8.95	14.40	US 30 east to SR 11 – East Liverpool	Southern end of US 30 concurrency
Columbiana	Madison Township	9.78	15.74	SR 518 west – West Point, Gavers	Eastern terminus of SR 518
Columbiana	Lisbon	14.80	23.82	SR 154 east (East Lincoln Way) to SR 11 – Rogers	Southern end of SR 154 concurrency
Columbiana	Lisbon	15.34	24.69	US 30 west (West Lincoln Way) / SR 164 south (South Market Street) / SR 154 ends / SR 517 begins	Northern end of US 30 concurrency; western terminus of SR 154, northern end of SR 154 concurrency; southern end of SR 164 concurrency; western terminus of SR 517, southern end of SR 517 concurrency
Columbiana	Lisbon	15.69	25.25	SR 164 north / SR 517 east (Jerome Street) – Columbiana	Northern end of SR 164 concurrency; western terminus of SR 517
Columbiana	Salem Township	20.73	33.36	SR 558 east / CR 411 (Teegarden Road) – Franklin Square	Western terminus of SR 558
Columbiana	Perry Township	25.68	41.33	SR 9 – Hanoverton, Salem	
Columbiana	Perry Township	26.91	43.31	US 62 west / SR 173 west (West State Street) – Alliance, Salem	Southern end of US 62 concurrency
Columbiana	Perry Township	27.32	43.97	SR 14 (Benton Road) – Ravenna, Salem	
Columbiana	Perry Township	28.79– 29.09	46.33– 46.82	SR 14T west to SR 14 – [[, Ohio|]]	Interchange; eastern terminus of SR 14T
Columbiana	Perry Township	29.34	47.22	US 62 east to County Road 410A / SR 9	Northern end of US 62 concurrency
Mahoning	Goshen–Green township line	30.60	49.25	SR 165 – Beloit, North Lima	
Mahoning	Ellsworth Township	36.15	58.18	US 224 – Canfield, Barberton	
Trumbull	Warren	51.08	82.21	US 422 (West Market Street) to SR 169	
Trumbull	Champion Township	54.24– 54.40	87.29– 87.55	SR 5 / SR 82 – Sharon, PA, Ravenna	Interchange
Trumbull	Champion Township	56.66	91.19	SR 305 – Southington, Cortland	
Trumbull	Bristol Township	62.27	100.21	SR 88 – West Farmington, [[, Ohio|]]	
Trumbull	Bloomfield Township	67.41	108.49	SR 87 – Middlefield, Kinsman	
Ashtabula	Orwell	72.47	116.63	US 322 (Main Street)	
Ashtabula	Rome Township	77.32	124.43	US 6 – Andover, Chardon	
Ashtabula	Austinburg Township	88.99	143.22	SR 307 – Jefferson	
Ashtabula	Austinburg Township	89.96– 90.08	144.78– 144.97	I-90 – Erie, PA, Cleveland	Exit 223 (I-90)
Ashtabula	Saybrook Township	92.39	148.69	SR 84 (South Ridge Road W)	
Ashtabula	Saybrook Township	93.42	150.34	US 20 – Geneva, Ashtabula	
Ashtabula	Saybrook Township	96.56	155.40	SR 531 / LECT – Geneva-on-the-Lake, Ashtabula Harbor	
1.000 mi = 1.609 km; 1.000 km = 0.621 mi: Concurrency terminus
