= East Fairfield, Ohio =

- Unincorporated community
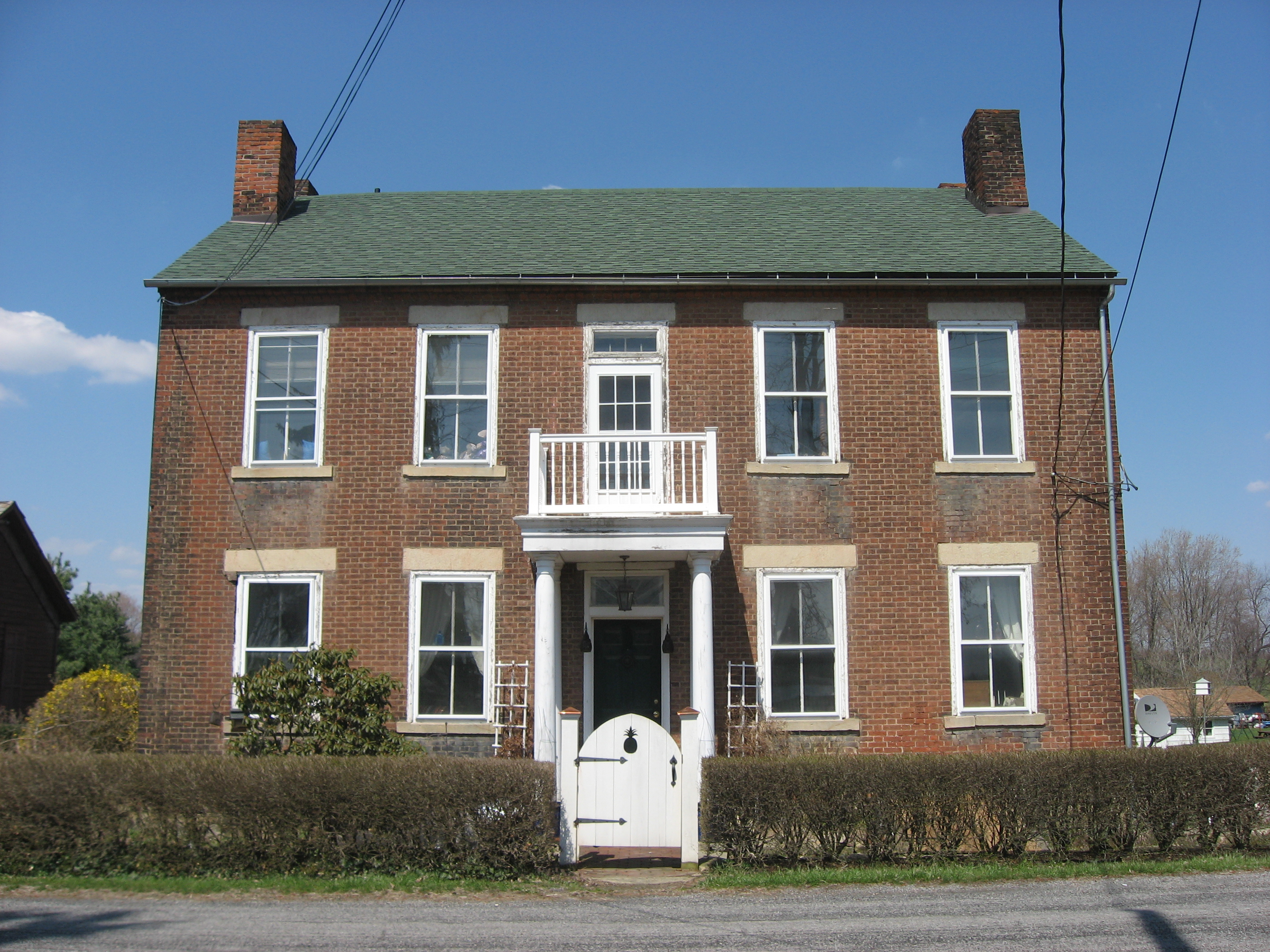
- Nicholas Eckis House, built in 1833.

- Location within Ohio Location within the United States
- Coordinates: 40°49′19″N 80°38′10″W
- Country: United States
- State: Ohio
- County: Columbiana
- Township: Fairfield
- Elevation: 1,230 ft (370 m)
- Time zone: UTC-5 (Eastern (EST))
  - Summer (DST): UTC-4 (EDT)
- ZIP code: 44445
- Area codes: 234/330
- GNIS feature ID: 1064579

East Fairfield is an unincorporated community in Fairfield Township, Columbiana County, Ohio, United States. The community is located at the intersection of Ohio State Routes 7, 517, and 558.

== History ==
East Fairfield was laid out in 1803. With the construction of the railroad, business activity shifted away from inland East Fairfield, and the town's population dwindled. A post office called East Fairfield was established in 1828, and remained in operation until 1906. Today, it is home to a few small businesses, farms, as well as a church.
