= Senator Galbraith =

Senator Galbraith

- Peter Galbraith (born 1950), Vermont State Senate
- Thomas J. Galbraith (1825–1909), Minnesota State Senate

== See also ==
- Asher A. Galbreath (1864–1935), Ohio State Senate
