= Church Hill Road Covered Bridge =

- U.S. National Register of Historic Places
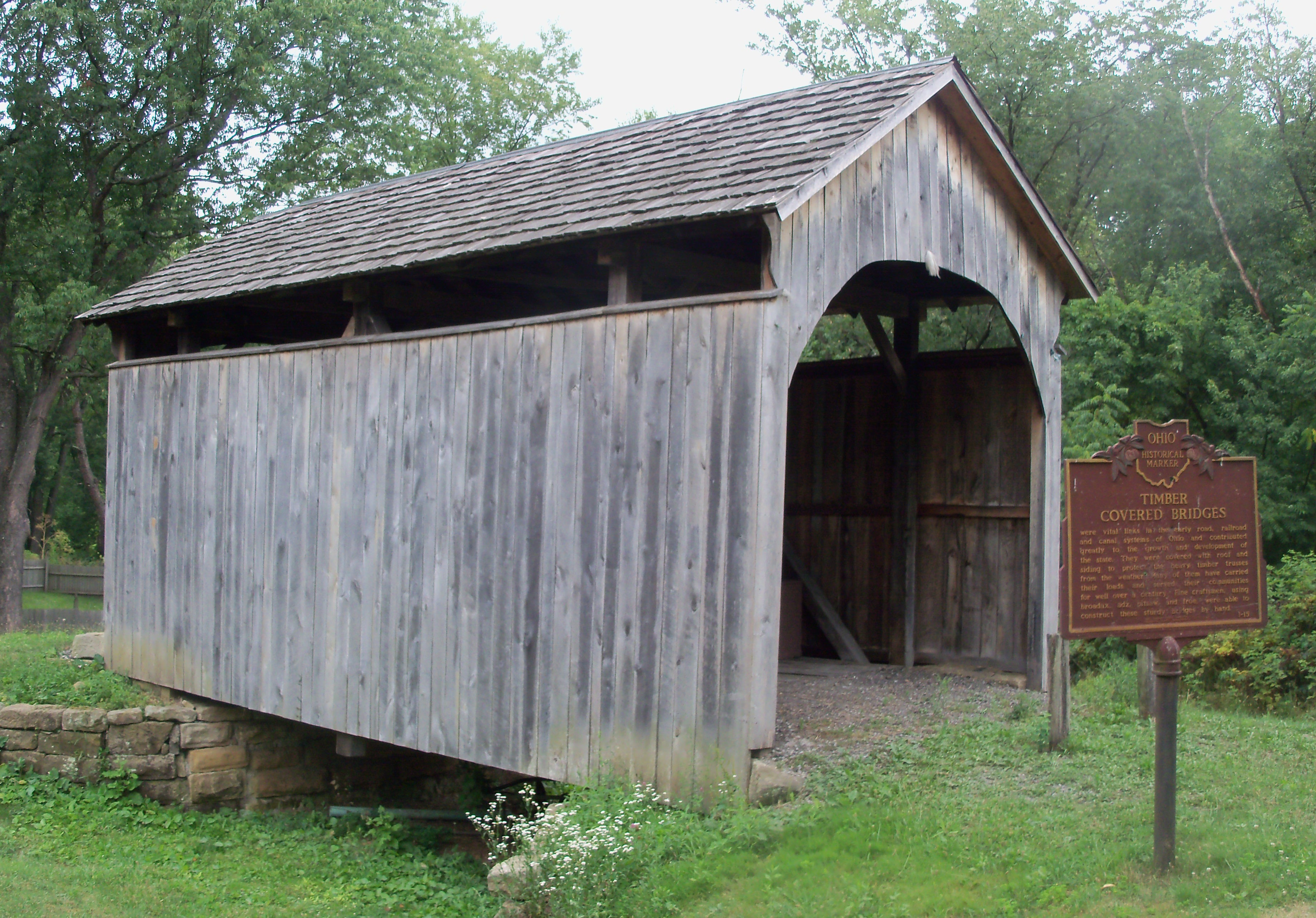

- Location within Ohio Location within the United States
- Nearest city: Elkton, Ohio
- Coordinates: 40.7619734°N 80.70354°W
- Area: less than one acre
- Built: 1870
- NRHP reference No.: 75001347
- Added to NRHP: June 11, 1975

The Church Hill Road Covered Bridge is a covered bridge in Columbiana County, Ohio. It was originally located over Middle Fork Little Beaver Creek in Elk Township. The bridge was constructed in 1870 and was relocated in 1982 behind a now closed restaurant on Ohio State Route 154 in Elkton, Ohio.

Spanning 19 feet 3 inches, the bridge is one of the shortest covered bridges for public highway use in the United States. It is a 2-panel single kingpost design.

The bridge was added to the National Register of Historic Places in June 1975.
