= Connecticut's 76th House of Representatives district =

American legislative district

Connecticut's 76th State House of Representatives district
Representative
John Piscopo; R

Connecticut's 76th House of Representatives district elects one member of the Connecticut House of Representatives. It consists of the towns of Burlington, Harwinton, Thomaston, and parts of Litchfield. It has been represented by Republican John Piscopo since 1989.

== List of representatives ==
List of Representatives from Connecticut's 76th State House District
Representative	Party	Years	District home	Note
C. Thomas Foley	Democratic	1967–1971	Portland	Seat created
Joseph S. Coatsworth	Democratic	1971–1973	Cromwell	
Francis W. Ciampi	Democratic	1973–1977	Waterbury	
Arnold Wellman Jr.	Democratic	1977–1983	Terryville	
William J. Butterly Jr.	Democratic	1983–1985	Watertown	
Francis J. Carpenter	Republican	1985–1987	Thomaston	
Marie Galbraith	Democratic	1987–1989	Thomaston	
John Piscopo	Republican	1989–	Thomaston	

== Recent elections ==
=== 2020 ===
2020 Connecticut State House of Representatives election, District 76
Party	Candidate	Votes	%
Republican	John Piscopo (incumbent)	8,779	59.11
Democratic	Paul Honig	5,676	38.22
Independent Party	John Piscopo (incumbent)	396	2.67
Total votes		11,805	100.00
Republican hold			

=== 2018 ===
2018 Connecticut House of Representatives election, District 76
Party	Candidate	Votes	%
Republican	John Piscopo (Incumbent)	7,615	64.5
Democratic	Paul Honig	4,190	35.5
Total votes		11,805	100.00
Republican hold			

=== 2016 ===
2016 Connecticut House of Representatives election, District 76
Party	Candidate	Votes	%
Republican	John Piscopo (Incumbent)	9,213	70.83
Democratic	Myra Watanabe	3,795	29.17
Total votes		13,008	100.00
Republican hold			

=== 2014 ===
2014 Connecticut House of Representatives election, District 76
Party	Candidate	Votes	%
Republican	John Piscopo (Incumbent)	7,189	75.4
Democratic	Stephen Simonin	2,345	24.6
Total votes		9,534	100.00
Republican hold			

=== 2012 ===
2012 Connecticut House of Representatives election, District 76
Party	Candidate	Votes	%
Republican	John Piscopo (Incumbent)	9,024	100.00
Total votes		9,024	100.00
Republican hold			
