= Pennsylvania Route 251 =

State highway in Beaver County, Pennsylvania, US

Pennsylvania Route 251

Route information
- Maintained by PennDOT
- Length: 11.595 mi (18.660 km)

Major junctions
- West end: SR 154 at the Ohio state line in South Beaver Township
- PA 168 in South Beaver Township; PA 51 near Big Beaver
- East end: PA 18 in Beaver Falls

Location
- Country: United States
- State: Pennsylvania
- Counties: Beaver

Highway system
- Pennsylvania State Route System; Interstate; US; State; Scenic; Legislative
← PA 250	→ PA 252

Pennsylvania Route 251 (PA 251) is an 11.6-mile-long (18.7 km) state highway located in Beaver County, Pennsylvania. The western terminus is at Ohio State Route 154 (SR 154) at the Ohio state line in South Beaver Township. The eastern terminus is at PA 18 in Beaver Falls.

== Route description ==
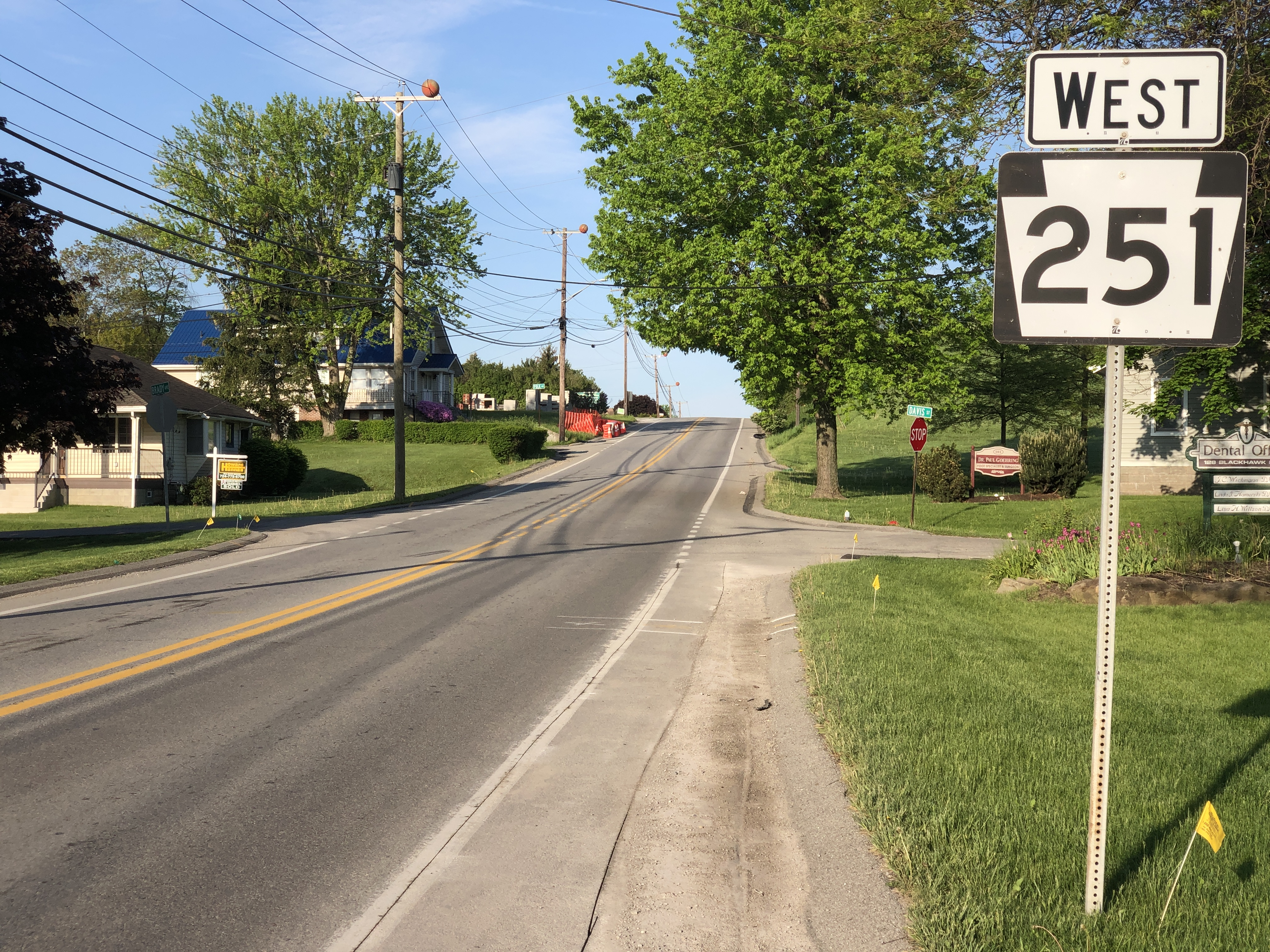
PA 251 westbound in Chippewa Township

PA 251 begins at the Ohio state line in South Beaver Township, where the road continues west into Ohio as SR 154. From the state line, the route heads southeast on two-lane undivided Blackhawk Road, passing through forested areas with a few fields. PA 251 intersects PA 168 and continues east through more rural areas. Farther east, residential development near the road increases and it enters Chippewa Township, heading east-northeast. In this area, the route passes to the south of Beaver County Airport before it makes a turn southeast onto Darlington Road. PA 251 enters commercial areas, turning north onto Shenango Road and intersecting PA 51. Past this intersection, the route passes more development, turning east onto Oakville Road. Here, the road passes through wooded areas of homes, coming to a bridge over I-376. From this point, PA 251 becomes 37th Street Extension and passes more residences, entering the borough of West Mayfield. The road continues east through residential portions of the borough and enters commercial areas. Upon passing over Norfolk Southern's Fort Wayne Line, the route crosses into the city of Beaver Falls and becomes 37th Street, heading through residential and business areas before ending at PA 18.

== Major intersections ==
The entire route is in Beaver County.

Location	mi	km	Destinations	Notes
South Beaver Township	0.000	0.000	SR 154 west (Richardson Avenue)	Ohio state line; western terminus of PA 251
South Beaver Township	2.942	4.735	PA 168	
Chippewa Township	8.465	13.623	PA 51 (Constitution Boulevard) to I-376	
Beaver Falls	11.595	18.660	PA 18 (4th Avenue)	Eastern terminus of PA 251
1.000 mi = 1.609 km; 1.000 km = 0.621 mi
