= Ohio State Route 517 =

State highway in Columbiana County, Ohio, US

State Route 517

Route information
- Maintained by ODOT
- Length: 8.50 mi (13.68 km)
- Existed: 1937–present

Major junctions
- West end: US 30 / SR 45 / SR 154 / SR 164 in Lisbon
- East end: SR 7 / SR 558 near Rogers

Location
- Country: United States
- State: Ohio
- Counties: Columbiana

Highway system
- Ohio State Highway System; Interstate; US; State; Scenic
← SR 516	→ SR 518

State Route 517 (SR 517) is an east–west state highway located in the northeastern quadrant of the U.S. state of Ohio. The western terminus of State Route 517 is in downtown Lisbon at a signalized intersection that marks the confluence of U.S. Route 30, State Route 45, State Route 154 and State Route 164. The eastern terminus is at the junction of State Route 7 and State Route 558 approximately 2 miles (3.2 km) north of the village of Rogers.

Established in the late 1930s, State Route 517 runs exclusively within Columbiana County, traversing through mainly rural terrain in the central and northeastern portions of the county.

== Route description ==
State Route 517, which lies entirely within the northeastern portion of Columbiana County, is not included within the National Highway System, a network of routes deemed most important for the economy, mobility and defense of the nation. The route itself is only 8.5 miles long (13.68 km) and travels from Lisbon to East Fairfield, which is the quickest route between the two. It intersects with various other routes and is home to much residential housing.

== History ==
Established in 1937 along the routing that it currently utilizes between downtown Lisbon and the junction of State Route 7 and State Route 558, State Route 517 has not experienced any major changes in alignment since its designation.

== Major intersections ==
The entire route is in Columbiana County.

Location	mi	km	Destinations	Notes
Lisbon	0.00	0.00	US 30 / SR 45 south / SR 154 east (Lincoln Way) / SR 164 south (South Market Street) – Wellsville	Western end of SR 45 / SR 164 concurrency; western terminus of SR 154
Lisbon	0.35	0.56	SR 45 north (North Market Street) – Salem	Eastern end of SR 45 concurrency
Lisbon	0.73	1.17	SR 164 north / Race Road – Columbiana	Eastern end of SR 164 concurrency
Fairfield Township	8.18	13.16	SR 558 west – Salem	Western end of SR 558 concurrency
Fairfield Township	8.50	13.68	SR 7 / SR 558 east – Youngstown, Rogers, East Palestine	Eastern end of SR 558 concurrency
1.000 mi = 1.609 km; 1.000 km = 0.621 mi: Concurrency terminus
