= Elkton, Ohio =

- Unincorporated community
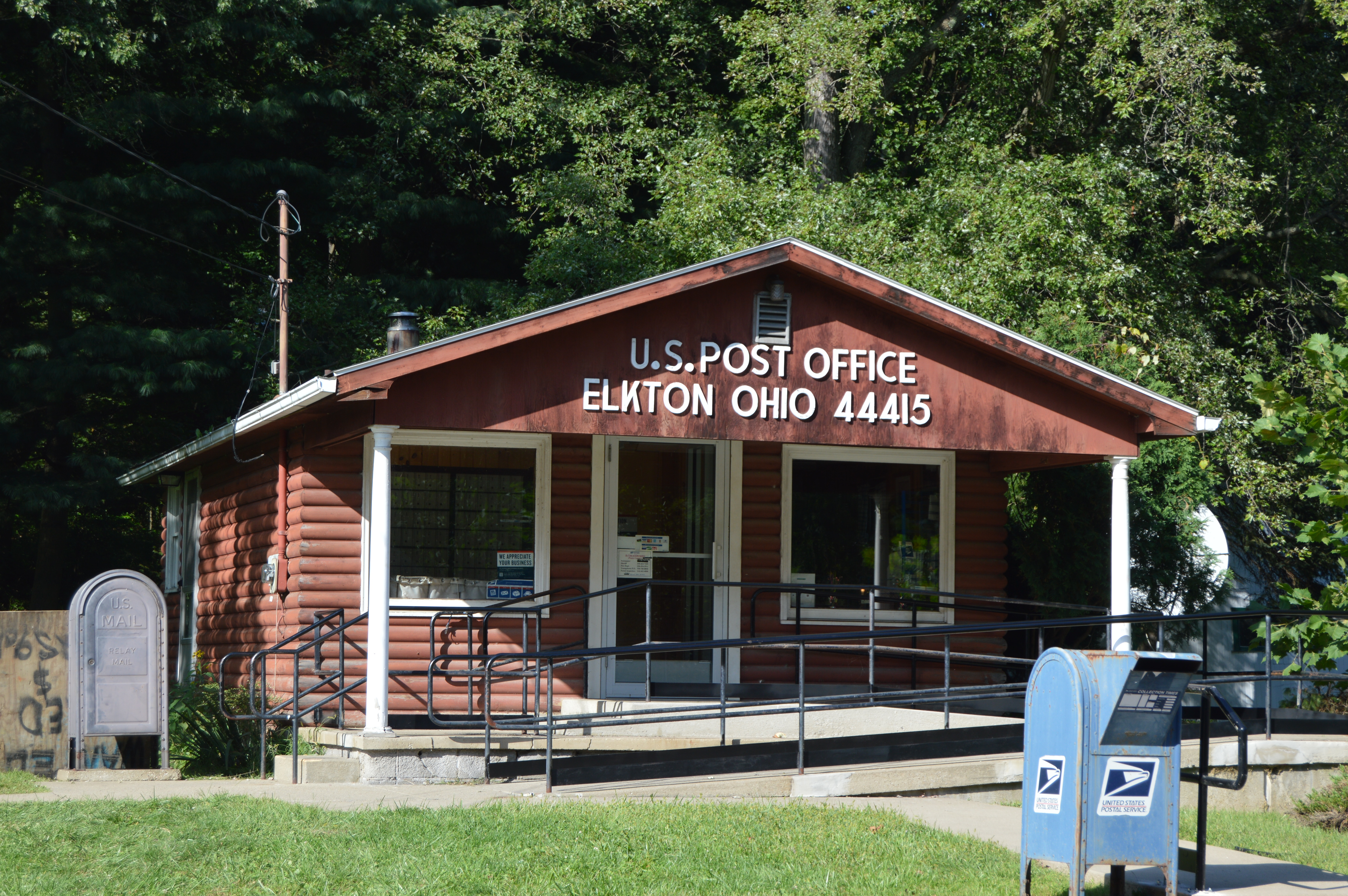
- Elkton post office

- Location within Ohio Location within the United States
- Coordinates: 40°45′43″N 80°41′55″W
- Country: United States
- State: Ohio
- County: Columbiana
- Township: Elkrun
- Elevation: 892 ft (272 m)
- Time zone: UTC-5 (Eastern (EST))
  - Summer (DST): UTC-3 (EDT)
- ZIP code: 44415
- GNIS feature ID: 1064610

Elkton is an unincorporated community in Columbiana County, Ohio, United States. It lies along Ohio State Route 154 at the confluence of Elk Run and Little Beaver Creek in Elkrun Township. The Federal Correctional Institution, Elkton low-security prison is located here.

Elkton was platted in 1835. The community derives its name from nearby Elk Run creek. A post office called Elkton has been in operation since 1838 and has the ZIP code 44415. The community thrived due to its location on the Sandy and Beaver Canal, but was in decline by the late 1840s when the canal became unprofitable and was suspended.

The Church Hill Road Covered Bridge is listed on the National Register of Historic Places. It is one of the shortest covered bridges for public highway use in the United States, at 19 feet 3 inches in length.
