= Volant College =

Defunct school of higher education

Volant College was a school of higher education in Volant, Pennsylvania from 1888 to about 1909.

== Origins ==
Initially known as Volant Normal Academy, the school was founded by A. A. Galbreath who served as its president and a professor, to provide high school graduates with necessary training to become teachers.

Construction of Volant Normal Academy was started in 1888 and the first classes were held in the Methodist Episcopal Church starting in 1889. The school building was completed and dedicated in May 1889.

== Development ==
The school was given the authority to grant degrees and the first commencement was held in the spring of 1890.

The college was renamed Volant College in 1892 and, at its peak, the college had approximately 150 students.

== Decline ==
Enrollment at the college declined due to the competition with schools such as Westminster College and Grove City College.

The school also became mired by disagreement and scandal. Galbreath left Volant in 1896 to manage Mt. Hope College. School property was seized in 1896 to repay one of Galbreath's debts. In 1898, there was an investigation into the validity of the degree program. However, the college was cleared as a result of the investigation.

In 1906, it was reported that there was a suspected scheme to use the school's correspondence school in Chicago to sell degrees.

The school closed its doors in 1909. A reunion was held in 1915 for former students and friends of the school.
