= John Piscopo =

American politician (born 1955)

Member of the Connecticut House of Representatives from the 76th district
- Incumbent
- Assumed office January 4, 1989
- Preceded by: Marie Galbraith

Personal details
- Born: 1955 (age 70–71)
- Party: Republican
- Education: Eastern Connecticut State University

John Piscopo (born 1955) is a Republican member of the Connecticut House of Representatives and is the Senior Republican Whip, the third-highest ranking leadership position within the House Republican caucus. He represents Burlington, Harwinton, Litchfield, and Thomaston. He was first elected in 1988. Piscopo is a board member of the American Legislative Exchange Council (ALEC). In October 2012, he was one of nine U.S. state legislators who went on an "ALEC Academy" trip to explore the Alberta tar sands.

Connecticut House of Representatives
Preceded by Marie W. Galbraith	Member of the Connecticut House of Representatives from the 76th district 1989–present	Incumbent
