= Nicholas Eckis House =

Historic house in Ohio, United States

- U.S. National Register of Historic Places
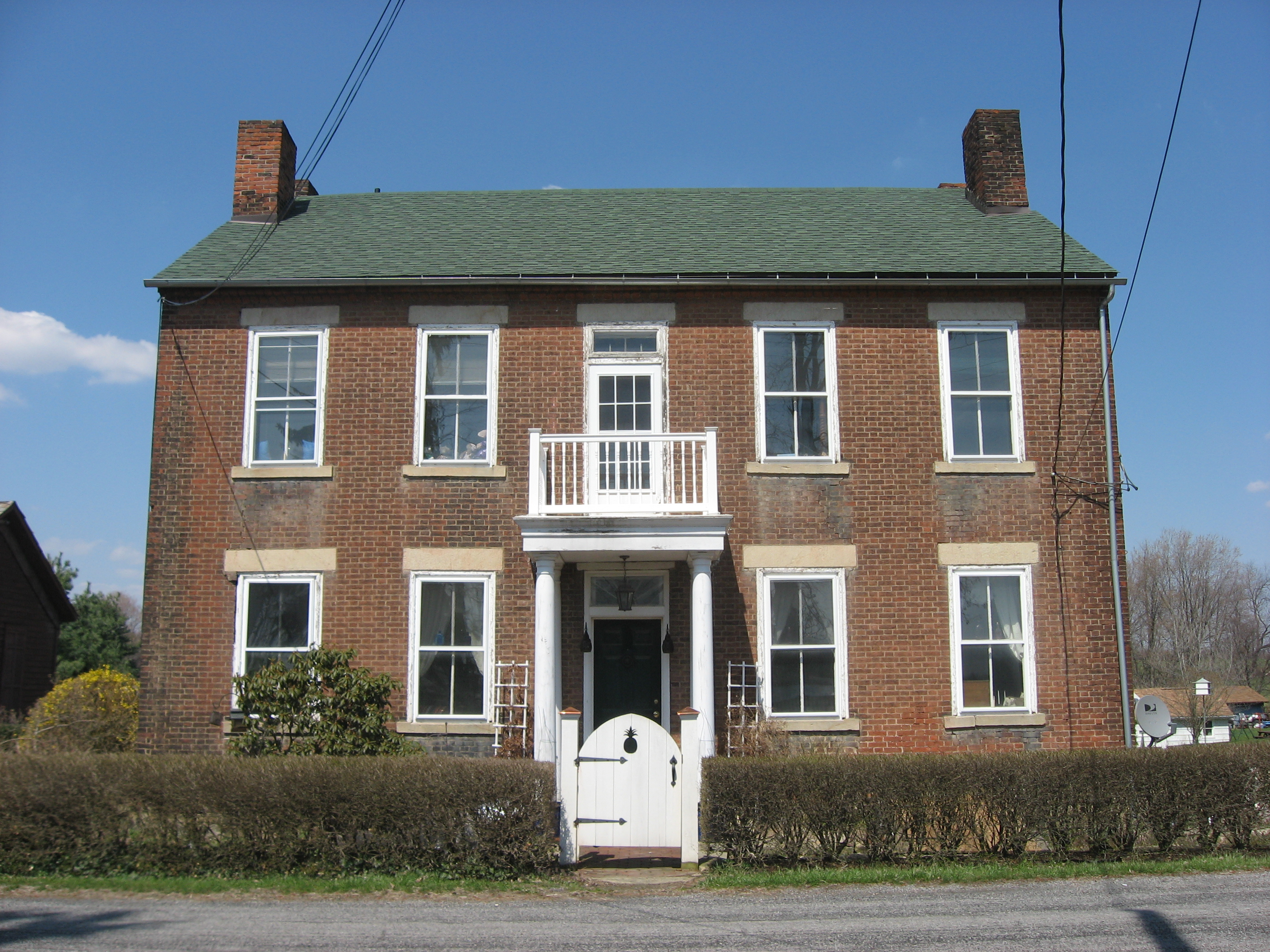
- Front of the house

- Location within Ohio Location within the United States
- Location: High Street, East Fairfield, Ohio
- Coordinates: 40°49′21″N 80°38′9″W
- Area: less than one acre
- Built: 1833
- NRHP reference No.: 80002962
- Added to NRHP: January 3, 1980

The Nicholas Eckis House is a historic house in East Fairfield, Ohio, United States. Located along the community's High Street, it is one of the oldest houses in East Fairfield.

Founded in 1803, East Fairfield is the oldest community in Fairfield Township. Most of the earliest buildings have been destroyed long ago; no more than four remain to the present time, and three of them have been heavily modified. Only the Nicholas Eckis House, built in 1833, remains with few changes. Its symmetrical floor plan is characteristic of early Ohio architecture, with features such as chimneys on each end, a curved water table, and detailed cornices. Also typical of the period is its simple facade, built of brick and covered with an asphalt roof.

Little is known about Nicholas Eckis himself; he is believed to have been a leading member of the mercantile community in northern Columbiana County during the 1820s and 1830s, but few other details of his life have survived, except for his house. As the oldest house in East Fairfield never to have been significantly modified, it was listed on the National Register of Historic Places in 1980.
