= Frank Galbreath =

American jazz musician

Frank Galbreath (September 2, 1913 – November 1971) was an American jazz trumpeter.

== Biography ==
A native of Robeson County, North Carolina, Galbreath got his start with local groups such as the Domino Five of Washington and Kelly's Jazz Hounds of Fayetteville. He then found work with groups in other regions such as the Florida Blossoms minstrel show and the Kingston Nighthawks, a territory band. He was with Smiling Billy Steward's Floridians when they played the 1933 World's Fair in Chicago.

In the middle of the 1930s, Galbreath moved to Chicago, where he played with Fletcher Henderson, Jelly Roll Morton, Edgar Hayes, and Willie Bryant. Around 1937 Galbreath joined Lonnie Slappey's Swingers in Philadelphia, but was called back to New York by Lucky Millinder, with whom he played for some time. Following this he joined Louis Armstrong's Orchestra until its dissolution in 1943; he then played with Charlie Barnet for a few weeks before serving in the Army. After his discharge he worked in the second half of the decade with Luis Russell, Tab Smith, Billy Eckstine, and Sy Oliver, then returned to play with Millinder from 1948 to 1952.

From 1952 Galbreath played in USO tours, first with Snub Mosley and then with various other ensembles over the course of the next decade. He led his own band during this time, and played in the bands of Arthur Prysock and Benny Goodman. In 1960 he played with Ray Charles and in 1961 with Fats Domino; he worked with Sammy Davis Jr. until 1963. That year he moved to Atlantic City and played locally until his failing health forced his retirement in 1969.
