= Lettice Galbraith =

British author

Lettice Galbraith (27 January 1859 – 8 July 1932) was a British author of the late Victorian and Edwardian period, remembered mainly for a collection of traditional supernatural tales titled New Ghost Stories (1893).

The author has been described as 'probably the most mysterious figure in the history of supernatural literature' and even 'a "ghost" herself' because her true identity remained a mystery until recently. Recent research has shown that 'Lettice Galbraith' was a pseudonym of Lizzie Susan Gibson, a native of Hull, Yorkshire, England. Lizzie (who was actually christened 'Lizzie' rather than 'Elizabeth') was known by the name 'Lettie' throughout her adult life.

== Life ==
Gibson was born on 27 January 1859, the youngest child of Edward Gibson (1812–1874) and his wife Susanna née Collinson (1818–1901). Edward was a reasonably affluent business-owner whose family had been building ships in the area of the Old Town and Drypool, Hull, since at least the 1780s. Her family were notable members of Hull's affluent middle-classes. Her paternal grandfather, also called Edward, was a respected Justice of the peace. Gibson received a private education at a girls' school in Beverley (about eight miles north-west of Hull) and, after her father's death (when she was fifteen), along with her mother, received a healthy income from land rents and other dividends. By this time Gibson and her family were living in the popular seaside town of Hornsea, to the north-west of Hull.

In the late 1880s Gibson and her mother relocated from Yorkshire to Reigate, Surrey, to be nearer other family members. Here she began her literary career. She would remain in the south of England for the rest of her life. On the death of her mother in 1901, Gibson lived with her brother Alfred, a vicar, first at Gray's Inn, Holborn, London, then, from 1911, in Downe (then in Kent, but now in Greater London), where his brother now practiced. She was instrumental in founding the Downe Women's Institute and Downe Infant Welfare Centre as well as numerous sporting and social clubs in the area. She was also active in the League of Mercy, an institution founded in 1899 to provide volunteers for (and to raise funds for) charity hospitals. After a short illness, Gibson died on 8 July 1932, aged 73, at The Vicarage, Downe. She was laid to rest in St Mary's Church in the town. She never married.

== Early work ==
Lettie's earliest short stories were published anonymously. The first was Dick Jocelyn's Wife (appearing in The Lady, November 1885), a short and simple tale of a woman who ignores the revelation that her husband-to-be is married to another woman (and has a child by her). Further tales appeared in The Whitehall Review and The Lady's Pictorial. These first three anonymously-published tales would later appear in Lettie's first collection, published by subscription, titled Pretty Miss Allington, and Other Tales (1893). The National Observer described the tales as 'society sketches with a certain sprightliness and a trick of reaching conclusions not altogether foregone'.

The first publication to bear Lettie's pseudonymous name (L. Galbraith) was a lengthy novelette which appeared in December 1892, initially attributed to 'a new writer', as the title story of The Spin of the Coin: A Romance of the Far West and of the Riding Ring. The volume was reissued, with the 'L. Galbraith' attribution, as one of Ward & Lock's 'Popular Sixpenny' paperbacks in late 1893. The Spin of the Coin was described as 'entrancing', 'clever' and 'a striking new story of powerful interest' by the publisher. It is, however, like Lettie's earlier work, standard late-Victorian domestic melodrama, exploring themes of domestic abuse, unhappy marriage, infidelity, insobriety, and criminality.

== New Ghost Stories ==
New Ghost Stories (1893) is regarded as a fine example of the Victorian, pre-Jamesian ghost story genre. The book went through at least three printings in 1893/94 as a 'sixpenny novel' and was still available for mail order a decade later, having become a mainstay of popular fireside fiction within the publisher's 'Popular Sixpenny' paperbacks canon. This was despite never receiving a review in the mainstream press nor even a concerted advertising campaign by its publisher. New Ghost Stories included the tales "The Case of Lady Lukestan", The Trainer's Ghost, The Ghost in the Chair, In the Séance Room, The Missing Model and The Ghost's Revenge. The story "The Case of Lady Lukestan" had actually appeared earlier, in Lloyd's Weekly Newspaper (February 1893) as well as in the April 1893 edition of American fiction magazine Short Stories.

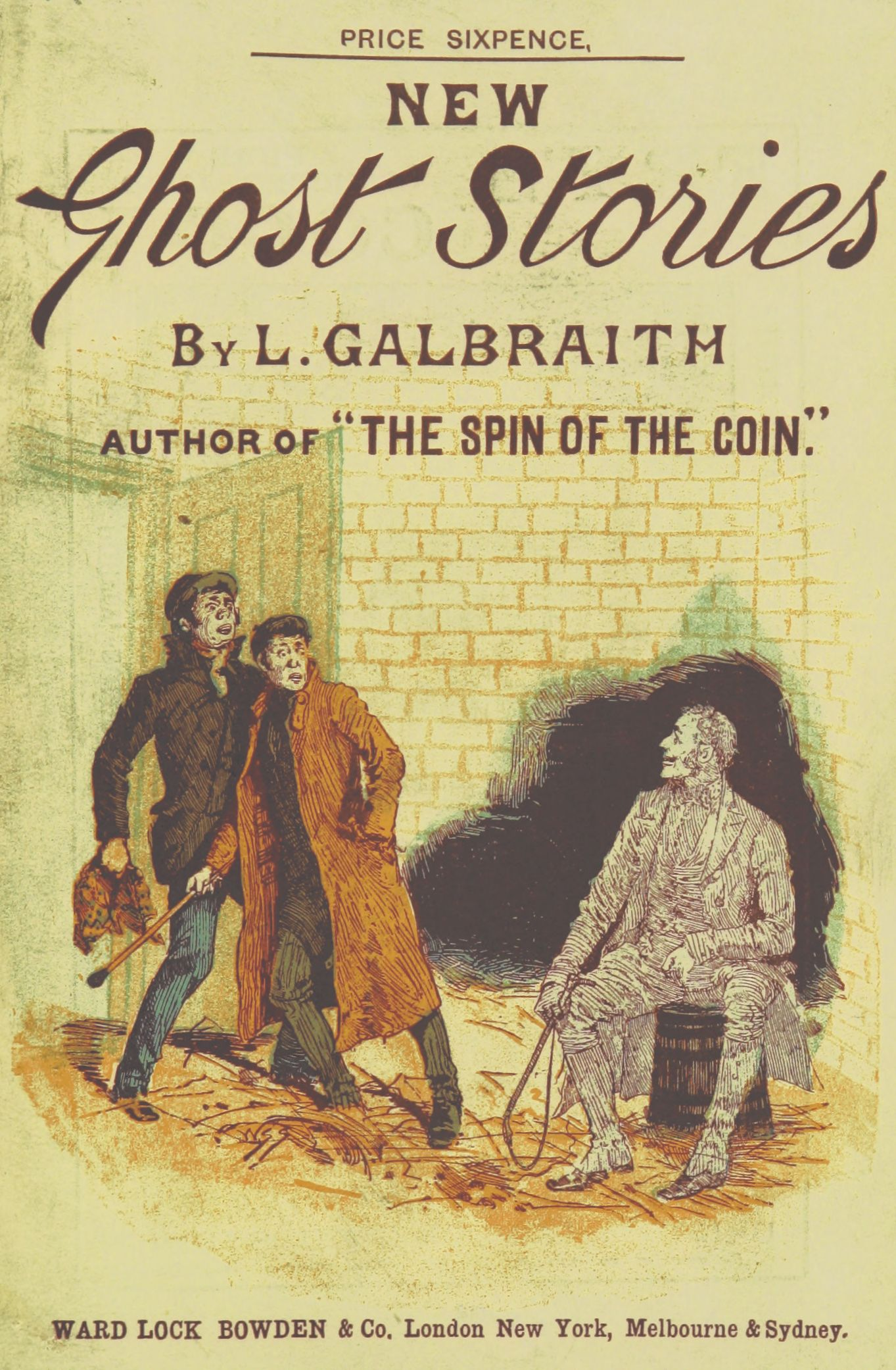
The title page from Lettice Galbraith's New Ghost Stories (1893).

These tales, together with the short story The Blue Room (which first appeared in Macmillan's Magazine in October 1897) were collected as The Blue Room and Other Ghost Stories by Sarob Press in 1999. A newer collection, which includes a complete biography and bibliography of the author, as well as another supernatural tale called The Ghost of Vittoria Pandelli (extracted from the novel Burnt Spices, 1906), was published in 2023 by Wimbourne Books.

Renowned anthologist Richard Dalby described Galbraith's ghost stories as 'fresh, lively and readable... in a clear crisper prose than most of their more verbose contemporaries'. Although not of the sophistication or strength of later Jamesian literature, Lettie's ghost stories are more accomplished than the overworked Gothic tropes of the period. Her tales prefigure much of the Edwardian style and are regarded as paradigms of fin-de-siècle supernatural fiction. They explore the Victorian predilection for psychology, esotericism and the attempt to rationalise the spirit domain with the scientific and technological advances of the era. The tale In the Séance Room is an early example of the female occult detective while the theme of vengeful female spirits is also apparent in Lettie's works.

== Later work ==
After her mother's death in 1901, Lettie returned to writing, but now concentrated solely on the novel. She also took the opportunity of reverting to her real name, publishing as 'L. S. Gibson'. She produced four novels. The Freemasons (1905) is a 'daringly original study' of unhappy marriage, the dangers of forbidden passion, and social responsibility in the Edwardian age. Burnt Spices (1906) is an effective occult novel featuring a mysterious German physician and psychic detective and the spirit of a spurned woman. Ships of Desire (1908) explores many of society's expectations of the time, but specifically the despondency of women who lack any control in life, love or financial independence. The Oakum Pickers (1912), Lettie's final publication, is the fatalistic story of two unhappily married women struggling with burgeoning and illicit romantic relationships, longing for reprieve and freedom.
