= Charles Burleigh Galbreath =

American author, historian, librarian

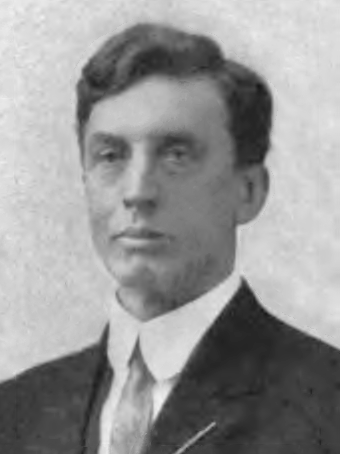
- Charles Burleigh Galbreath
- Born: February 25, 1858; Leetonia, Ohio
- Died: February 23, 1934 (aged 75); Bexley, Ohio
- Citizenship: United States of America
- Education: Mount Union College
- Occupations: Writer, historian, State Librarian of Ohio
- Spouse: Ida M. Kelly Galbreath
- Children: Albert Webster Galbreath
- Relatives: Asher A. Galbreath
- Writing career
- Pen name: C. B. Galbreath

Charles Burleigh (C. B.) Galbreath (February 25, 1858 – February 23, 1934) was a writer, historian, educator, and librarian in Ohio. He was appointed as State Librarian at the State Library of Ohio from 1896–1911 and from 1915-1918. He was the Secretary and Librarian at the Ohio Archaeological and Historical Society (now known as Ohio History Connection) from 1920-1934.

== Early life and career ==
Galbreath was born February 25, 1858, in Leetonia, Ohio. His parents were Edward Paxson Galbreath and Jane Minerva (Shaw) Galbreath. He attended school until the age of 13 when he was forced to leave because of the illness of his father. After two years, he returned to school and graduated from New Lisbon High School in 1879. After high school, Galbreath attended Mount Union College in Alliance, Ohio, from which he graduated with a Master of Arts in 1883.

Galbreath began teaching at the age of 17 and completed a course at Mount Union. Upon graduation from Mount Union, Galbreath accepted the position of superintendent of the Wilmot, Ohio, school system and served there from 1883 to 1885, leaving to become the superintendent of the East Palestine City School District where he served for eight years.

Galbreath was the county school examiner for Columbiana County Schools from 1885 until 1893. During the summers of 1891 and 1892, he taught at Ohio Normal University (now Ohio Northern University) in Ada, Ohio. In 1893, he took a position teaching at Mount Hope College in Rogers, Ohio, and later became president of the college after purchasing it in 1894 with his brother Asher. In December 1896, Asher started managing Mt. Hope College full-time due to his brother's appointment.

== State librarian ==
The 72nd Ohio General Assembly created a library commission which, in 1896, elected Galbreath State Librarian of the State Library of Ohio. At this time, the position of State Librarian was viewed as a political 'reward' for support of the administration and, as such, the librarian was often changed with each election. An effect of this is the fact that between 1896 and 1921, the position of State Librarian went back and forth four times between John Newman, during democratic administrations, and Galbreath, during republican administrations. Galbreath served in this capacity twice, from 1896–1911 and again from 1915 - 1918.

While serving as state librarian, Galbreath instituted 'traveling libraries' to serve rural communities in Ohio. By the time of his departure from the post in 1911, there were 1200 traveling libraries with over 56,000 volumes. Between 1927 and 1928, when the state library was closed because of a lack of funds, Galbreath and others volunteered to keep the traveling libraries in operation.

Galbreath was the first president of the National Association of State Librarians in 1900.

== Ohio constitutional convention ==
In 1912, a constitutional convention was held in Ohio. One of the first orders of business was to elect a secretary of the convention. A. Ross Read, delegate from Akron, nominated Galbreath for the post. In the nomination, Read cited Galbreath's experience as state librarian and his familiarity with legislative procedure as well as his writings. Galbreath was elected on the second ballot. The role of the secretary included keeping the records and publishing the proceedings of the convention.

== Selected publications ==
Throughout his life, Galbreath wrote and published a number of works. These included histories, poetry, commentary, pamphlets and essays. Here is a list of some of his works:

- The First Newspaper of the Northwest Territory. in Ohio Archaeological and Historical Publications, Volume 13. (Fred J. Heer, 1901)
- Lafayette's Visit to the Ohio Valley States. In Ohio History Sketches, Pearson, F., & Harlor, J., Ed. (F. J. Heer, 1903)
- Songwriters of Ohio. Ohio archaeological and historical quarterly, Volume 13. Published for the Society by A.H. Smythe, 1904
- Daniel Decatur Emmet: Author of "Dixie"; (Kessinger Publishing, 1904); ISBN 978-0-548-76418-3
- Benjamin Russel Hanby: Author of "Darling Nelly Gray"; (Columbus, OH: Fred J. Heer, 1905; ISBN 978-1-175-46101-8
- Alexander Coffman Ross: Author of "Tippecanoe and Tyler, too"; (Columbus, OH: Fred J. Heer, 1905; ISBN 978-1-149-89519-1
- Shall the State Kill?, The Ohio History Magazine, Volume 2, Number 1, January 1907
- Historical Work of the State Library. in Proceedings of the Ohio Valley Historical Association. Meeting. (Ohio State Archaeological and Historical Society, 1908)
- The Battle of Lake Erie in Ballad and History. Ohio Archaeological and Historical Publications, xx (1911), 415-456
- Initiative and Referendum: Published for the Constitutional Convention of 1912; (Nabu Press, 1912); ISBN 1-144-03351-9
- The Constitution of the United States and the constitutions of Ohio: constitutional conventions of Ohio and their work; (F.J. Heer Print. Co., 1912)
- The Ballad of James Bird. Ohio Archaeological and Historical Quarterly, January, 1917, xxvi, 52-57
- This crimson flower: In Flanders fields, an answer, and other verse; (Columbus, OH: Stoneman Press, 1919; ISBN 978-1-140-31899-6
- The Logan Elm and the Dunmore War (Columbus, OH: Ohio State Archaeological and Historical Society, 1924)
- History of Ohio (5 volumes); (Reprint Services Corp., 1925) ISBN 978-0-7812-5367-3
