= Marie Galbraith =

American politician (1946–2022)

Member of the Connecticut House of Representatives from the 76th district
- In office 1987–1989
- Preceded by: Francis J. Carpenter
- Succeeded by: John Piscopo

Personal details
- Born: Marie Winans; September 19, 1946 Mount Vernon, New York, U.S.
- Died: October 7, 2022 (aged 76) Watertown, Connecticut, U.S.
- Party: Democratic
- Spouse: Joseph Galbraith
- Children: 1

Marie Galbraith (September 19, 1946 – October 7, 2022) was an American politician who served in the Connecticut House of Representatives from 1987 to 1989, representing the 76th district as a Democrat.

== Personal life and education ==
Galbraith was born Marie Winans on September 19, 1946, in Mount Vernon, New York. She was married to Joseph Galbraith, and they had a daughter together.

From 2001 to 2012, Galbraith worked as executive director of the Mattatuck Museum in Waterbury, Connecticut.

Galbraith died on October 7, 2022, in Watertown, Connecticut. She was 76.

== Political career ==
Galbraith served on the town of Thomaston, Connecticut's boards of education and finance. She was a part of the Connecticut Council on the Humanities and a founding member of the Waterbury chapter of the National Organization for Women.

Galbraith was elected to the Connecticut House of Representatives in 1986, and she served one term representing the 76th district as a Democrat. Galbraith ran for reelection in 1988 and 1990, but was defeated by Republican candidate John Piscopo in both elections.
