= Ohio State Route 154 =

State highway in Columbiana County, Ohio, US

State Route 154

Route information
- Maintained by ODOT
- Length: 16.27 mi (26.18 km)
- Existed: 1923–present

Major junctions
- West end: US 30 / SR 45 / SR 164 / SR 517 in Lisbon
- SR 11 near Elkton
- East end: PA 251 near Negley

Location
- Country: United States
- State: Ohio
- Counties: Columbiana

Highway system
- Ohio State Highway System; Interstate; US; State; Scenic
← SR 153	→ SR 155

State Route 154 (SR 154) is a 16.27-mile-long (26.18 km) Ohio State Route that runs between Lisbon and the Pennsylvania state line in the US state of Ohio. Some of the highway is listed on the National Highway System. Most of the route is a rural two-lane highway and passes through both farmland and woodland. The highway was first signed in 1923 on a route that is now SR 517 and SR 558. SR 154 was rerouted in 1926 to its current alignment. Two section of the highway was paved in 1929, with the rest of the route was paved in 1933.

== Route description ==
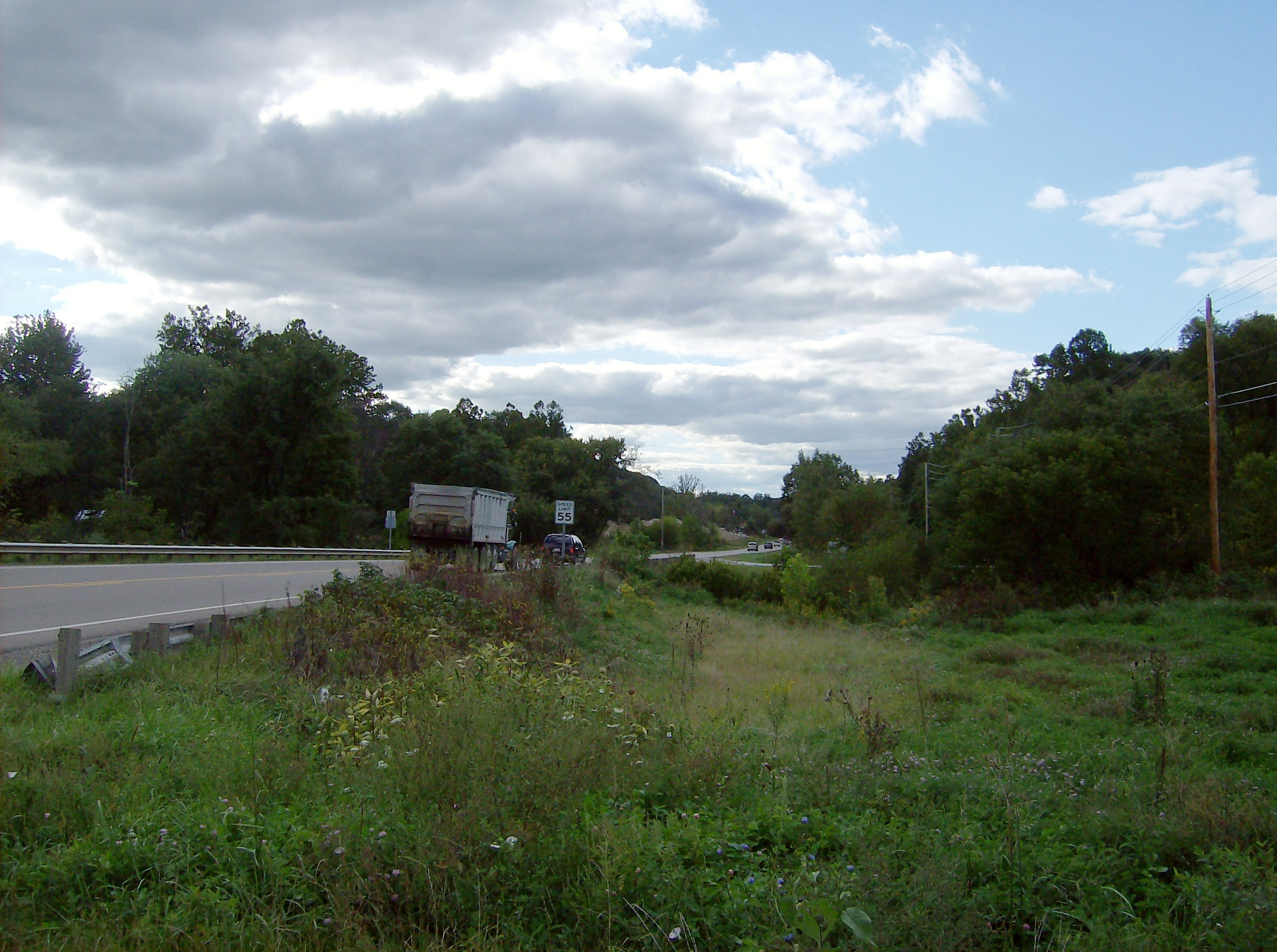
Westbound along State Route 154, in Elkrun Township between the SR 11 interchange and Lisbon.

SR 154 heads east from its western terminus at an intersection with US 30, SR 45, SR 164, and SR 517 in downtown Lisbon. The highway heads through the east side of downtown Lisbon, concurrent with US 30 and SR 45, passing through commercial properties as a two-lane highway. The route leaves downtown and passes through residential properties. The concurrency with US 30 and SR 45 ends on the east side of Lisbon with US 30 and SR 45 heading southeast and SR 154 still heading east. After the concurrency ends, the road passing through woodland, with some houses. The highway turns northeast, having an interchange with SR 11, before leaving Lisbon. East of Lisbon the road turns southeast and passes the Federal Correctional Institution, Elkton.

SR 154 turns back east, with the correctional institution on the north side of the roadway, highway passes through a mix of farmland and woodland and enters Elkton. In Elkton the highway heads north, with the correctional institution on the west of the highway, before turning northeast. The road passes through mostly woodland, with some farmland and houses. The route turns southeast, before heading east and entering the town of Rogers. In Rogers the highway passes through residential and a traffic signal with SR 7. East of SR 7 the road heads northeast passing through woodland and running parallel to a railroad track. The route curves southeast and enters the town of Negley. In Negley the road has a short concurrency with SR 170. East of Negley the highway heads southeast towards Pennsylvania. SR 154 ends at the Pennsylvania state line and continues into the state as Pennsylvania Route 251.

The only section of SR 154 that is included as a part of the National Highway System (NHS), is that from the western end of the US 30 concurrency to the interchange at SR 11. The NHS is a system of routes determined to be the most important for the nation's economy, mobility and defense. The highway is maintained by the Ohio Department of Transportation (ODOT) like all other state routes in the state. The department tracks the traffic volumes along all state highways as a part of its maintenance responsibilities using a metric called average annual daily traffic (AADT). This measurement is a calculation of the traffic level along a segment of roadway for any average day of the year. In 2009, ODOT figured that the lowest traffic levels were present on the section between County Road 419 (CR 419) and Rogers, where only 1,120 vehicles used the highway daily. The peak traffic volume was 8,580 vehicles AADT along a section of SR 154 that is concurrent with US 30 and SR 45.

== History ==
SR 154 was first signed in 1923, on a route between Lisbon and East Palestine, passing through East Fairfield, along current SR 517 and SR 558. In 1926, the highway was rerouted from Lisbon to Pennsylvania state line along current routing. The former route from Lisbon to East Palestine was decommissioned. Paving of the road between Lisbon and Elkton and from Rogers to Pennsylvania state line happened in 1929. The rest of the highway, between Elkton and Rogers, was paved in 1933. The former route of SR 154 between Lisbon and East Palestine was commissioned as SR 517, west of East Fairfield, and SR 558, east of East Fairfield.

== Major intersections ==
The entire route is in Columbiana County.

Location	mi	km	Destinations	Notes
Lisbon	0.00	0.00	US 30 west / Lincoln Highway west – Canton SR 45 north / SR 164 / SR 517 north	Western terminus of SR 154; west end of US 30, Lincoln Highway and SR 45 concurrency; Southern terminus of SR 517
Lisbon	0.54	0.87	US 30 east / SR 45 south / Lincoln Highway east – West Point, East Liverpool	Eastern end of US 30, Lincoln Highway, and SR 45 concurrency
Elkrun Township	2.29	3.69	SR 11 – East Liverpool, Youngstown	
Rogers	9.78	15.74	SR 7 – East Liverpool, Youngstown	
Negley	14.38	23.14	SR 170 north	Western end of SR 170 concurrency
Negley	14.44	23.24	SR 170 south	Eastern end of SR 170 concurrency
Middleton Township	16.27	26.18	PA 251 east	Crosses into Pennsylvania where it is signed PA 251
1.000 mi = 1.609 km; 1.000 km = 0.621 mi: Concurrency terminus
