= Franklin Square, Ohio =

Unincorporated community in Ohio, U.S.

Coordinates: 40°51′22″N 80°47′30″W

Franklin Square is an unincorporated community in central Salem Township, Columbiana County, Ohio, United States.

== History ==
A post office called Franklin Square was established in 1830, and remained in operation until 1914. Besides the post office, Franklin Square had several shops, a church and schoolhouse.
