= Asher A. Galbreath =

American politician

Asher Abraham Galbreath PhD

Member of the Ohio Senate from the 20th and 22nd district
- In office 1917–1918

Personal details
- Born: June 8, 1864 Fairfield Township, Columbiana County, Ohio
- Died: December 18, 1935 (aged 71) Fairfield Township, Columbiana County, Ohio
- Party: Republican
- Spouse: Anna M. FitzRandolph Galbreath
- Education: Mount Union College
- Occupation: Attorney
- Profession: Politician
- Other offices held: Mayor of Rogers, Ohio

Asher A. Galbreath (June 8, 1864 – December 18, 1935) was an American lawyer, politician, educator, and businessman. He was the founder, president, and professor at two colleges. He was elected mayor of Rogers, Ohio and State Senator. He was also the president of the National Typewriter Company. He was married and had six children.

== Early life and education ==
Galbreath was born on a farm in Fairfield Township, Columbiana County, Ohio, on June 8, 1864. He graduated from New Lisbon High School. In 1888 he graduated from Mount Union College in Alliance, Ohio.

== Political life ==
Galbreath was an attorney in Columbiana County, Ohio. Locally, he was elected mayor of Rogers, Ohio, and also held the position of County Liquor License Commissioner of Columbiana County. In 1917 he was elected State Senator and was part of the 82nd Ohio General Assembly. In 1924 and again in 1926, Galbreath ran for Lieutenant Governor of Ohio but was defeated in the primary election on both occasions.

== College president and professor ==
Galbreath served as president and professor at Volant Normal Academy in Volant, Pennsylvania. At that time, a normal school existed to provide high school graduates with necessary training to become teachers. Construction of Volant Normal Academy was started in 1888 and the first classes were held in the Methodist Episcopal Church starting in 1889. Galbreath was called the "driving force" behind the creation of the academy. His wife, Anna M. Galbreath, was referred to as "the mother of Volant College". Volant Normal Academy was completed and dedicated in May 1889. The school was given the authority to grant degrees and the first commencement was held in the spring of 1890. The college was renamed Volant College in 1892. At its peak, the college had approximately 150 students.

Enrollment at the college declined due to the competition with schools such as Westminster College and Grove City College. Additionally, an investigation into the validity of the degree program took place in 1898. The college was cleared as a result of the investigation.

In 1894, Galbreath and his brother Charles purchased Mt. Hope Academy in Rogers. In December 1896 Professor Galbreath left Volant to manage Mt. Hope College.

The attorney general for the State of Ohio filed a petition against Mt. Hope College in February 1900, alleging that the college was conferring degrees solely on the basis of fees paid by the student to the president of the college without requiring the students to attend classes or pass any kind of examination. As a result of the investigation, the charter of Mt. Hope College was annulled and the college was closed.

After the closing of Mt. Hope College, Galbreath's endeavors included running a correspondence school known as Carnegie College in Rogers. and the renting and sale of typewriters for the Galbreath Typewriter Company (through Carnegie College).
