= Rogers, Ohio =

- Village
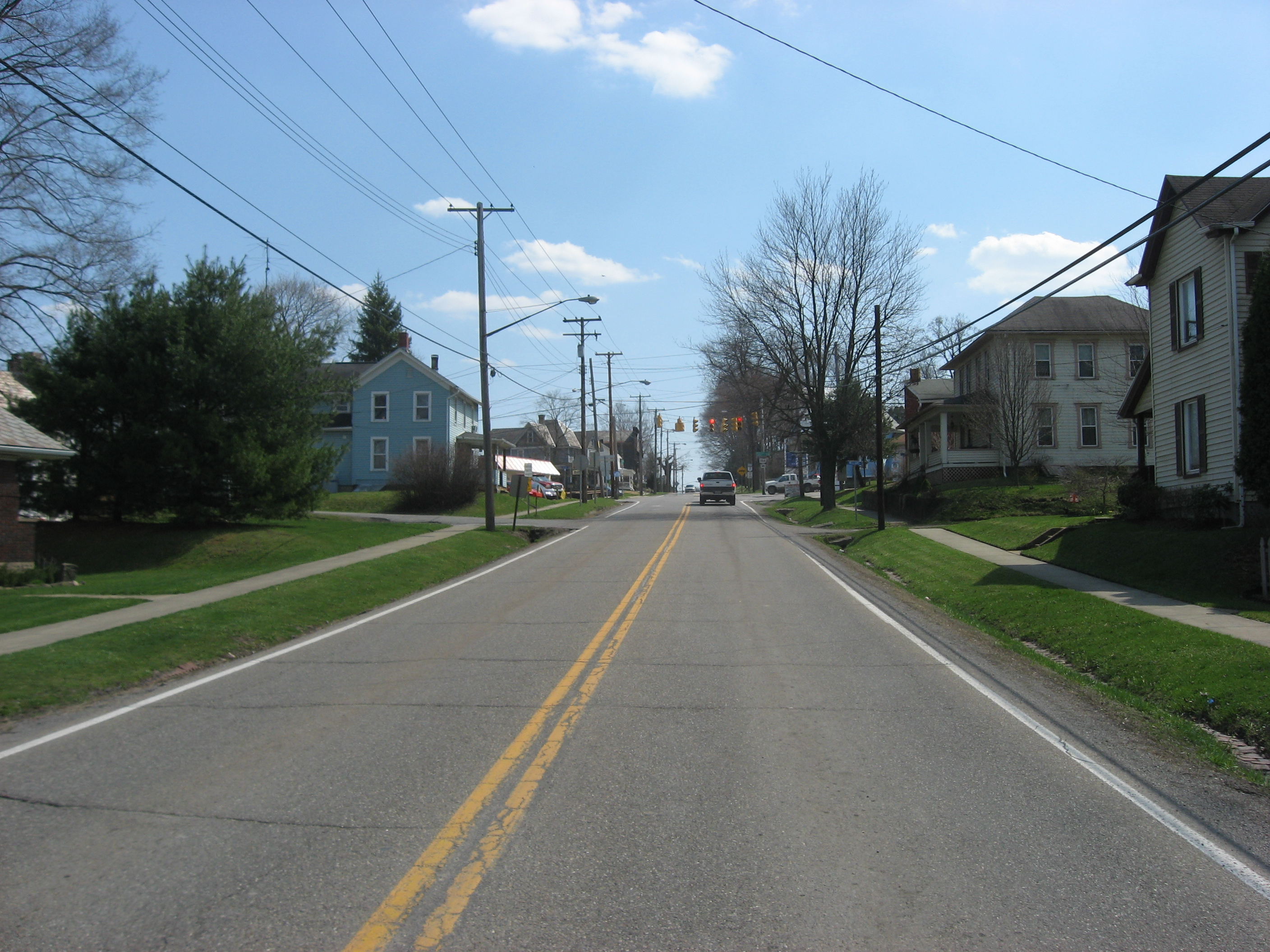
- Ohio State Route 7
- Interactive map of Rogers, Ohio
- Location within Ohio Location within the United States
- Coordinates: 40°47′23″N 80°37′33″W
- Country: United States
- State: Ohio
- County: Columbiana
- Founded: 1883

Government
  - Type: Mayor–council

Area
  - Total: 0.23 sq mi (0.59 km^{2})
  - Land: 0.23 sq mi (0.59 km^{2})
  - Water: 0 sq mi (0.00 km^{2})
- Elevation: 1,099 ft (335 m)

Population (2020)
  - Total: 194
  - Density: 853.1/sq mi (329.39/km^{2})
- Time zone: UTC-5 (Eastern (EST))
  - Summer (DST): UTC-4 (EDT)
- ZIP code: 44455
- Area codes: 330, 234
- FIPS code: 39-68084
- GNIS feature ID: 2399110
- School District: Beaver Local School District

Rogers is a village in Columbiana County, Ohio, United States. The population was 194 at the 2020 census. It is known for having one of the largest flea markets in Ohio.

== History ==
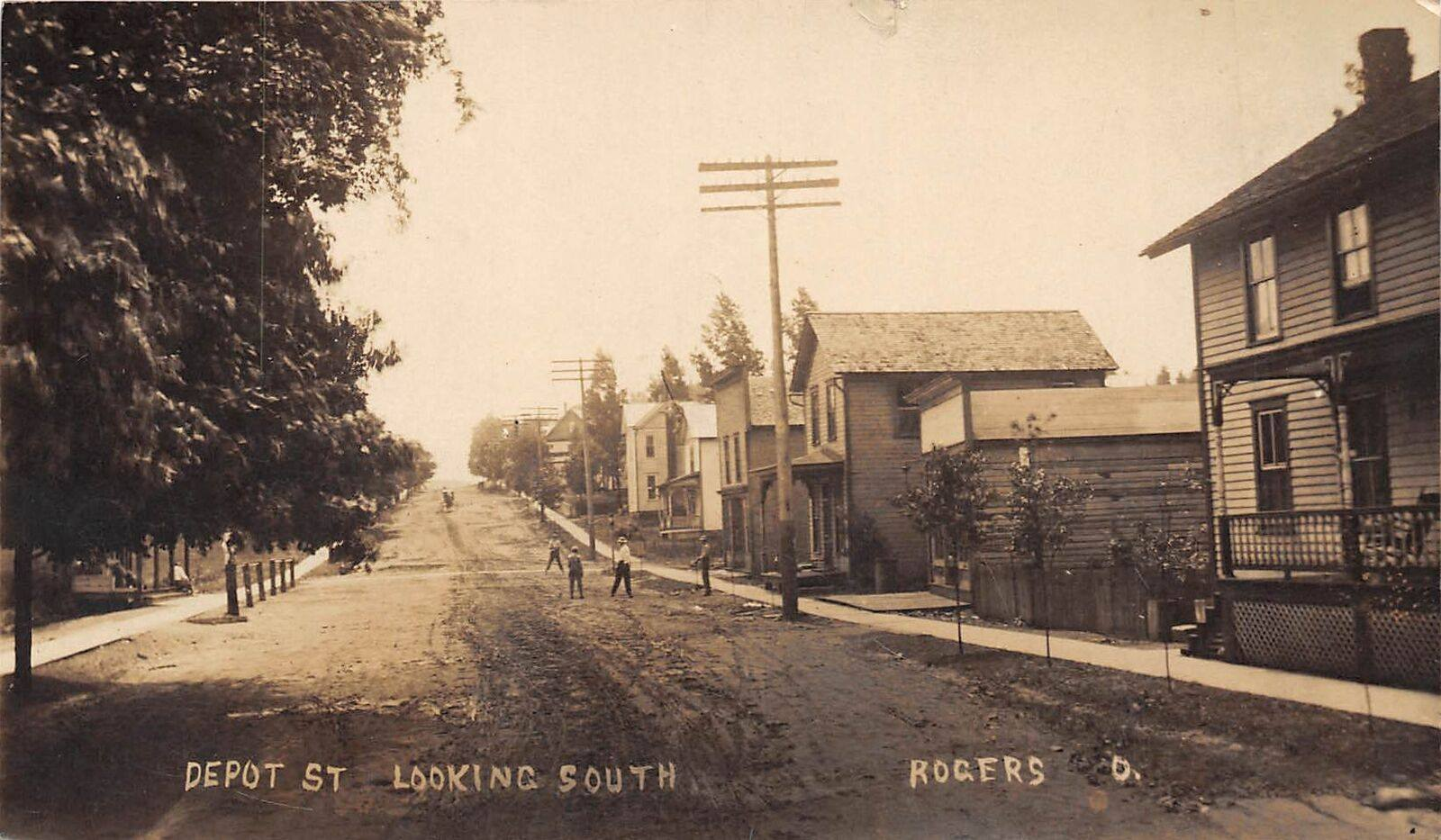
Depot Street, 1914

Rogers was laid out in 1883 following the construction of the Pittsburgh, Lisbon and Western Railroad through the territory. It was named for its founder, T. G. Rogers. Rogers was incorporated as a village in 1895.

Mount Hope College was an academy located on Highland Avenue in Rogers, founded in 1883. In 1894, the academy burned, but was rebuilt and purchased by brothers Asher A. Galbreath and Charles Burleigh Galbreath. The Ohio Attorney General filed a petition against Mount Hope College in 1900, alleging that the college was conferring degrees solely based on fees paid by the student to the president of the college without requiring the students to attend classes or pass any kind of examination. As a result of the investigation, the college was closed and its charter was revoked. In 1905, Asher A. Galbreath opened a correspondence school named Carnegie College in Rogers, which later became a public school.

== Geography ==
Rogers is located along the Little Bull Creek. According to the United States Census Bureau, the village has a total area of 0.23 square miles (0.60 km^{2}), all land.

== Demographics ==
Historical population
Census	Pop.	Note	%±
1900	287		—
1910	258		−10.1%
1920	241		−6.6%
1930	270		12.0%
1940	300		11.1%
1950	297		−1.0%
1960	295		−0.7%
1970	310		5.1%
1980	298		−3.9%
1990	247		−17.1%
2000	266		7.7%
2010	237		−10.9%
2020	194		−18.1%
U.S. Decennial Census

=== 2010 census ===
As of the census of 2010, there were 237 people, 85 households, and 66 families living in the village. The population density was 1,030.4 inhabitants per square mile (397.8/km^{2}). There were 93 housing units at an average density of 404.3 per square mile (156.1/km^{2}). The racial makeup of the village was 98.3% White, 0.4% African American, and 1.3% from two or more races.

There were 85 households, of which 37.6% had children under the age of 18 living with them, 48.2% were married couples living together, 22.4% had a female householder with no husband present, 7.1% had a male householder with no wife present, and 22.4% were non-families. 16.5% of all households were made up of individuals, and 7.1% had someone living alone who was 65 years of age or older. The average household size was 2.79 and the average family size was 3.05.

The median age in the village was 39.3 years. 21.1% of residents were under the age of 18; 13% were between the ages of 18 and 24; 23.6% were from 25 to 44; 30.8% were from 45 to 64; and 11.4% were 65 years of age or older. The gender makeup of the village was 47.7% male and 52.3% female.

=== 2000 census ===
As of the census of 2000, there were 266 people, 95 households, and 72 families living in the village. The population density was 1,132.4 inhabitants per square mile (437.2/km^{2}). There were 99 housing units at an average density of 421.5 per square mile (162.7/km^{2}). The racial makeup of the village was 99.25% White, and 0.75% from two or more races. Hispanic or Latino of any race were 0.75% of the population.

There were 95 households, out of which 45.3% had children under the age of 18 living with them, 55.8% were married couples living together, 14.7% had a female householder with no husband present, and 24.2% were non-families. 21.1% of all households were made up of individuals, and 10.5% had someone living alone who was 65 years of age or older. The average household size was 2.80 and the average family size was 3.19.

In the village, the population was spread out, with 30.8% under the age of 18, 7.9% from 18 to 24, 35.3% from 25 to 44, 16.5% from 45 to 64, and 9.4% who were 65 years of age or older. The median age was 33 years. For every 100 females there were 111.1 males. For every 100 females age 18 and over, there were 106.7 males.

The median income for a household in the village was $31,250, and the median income for a family was $33,036. Males had a median income of $30,625 versus $18,750 for females. The per capita income for the village was $12,055. About 15.5% of families and 14.7% of the population were below the poverty line, including 15.1% of those under the age of eighteen and 21.7% of those 65 or over.

== Flea market ==
Rogers Community Auction and Flea Market, located in Elkrun Township, derives its name from the nearby village of Rogers. Active since 1955 and one of the largest flea markets in Ohio, it is an open-air market held year-round, sitting on 250 acres (1,000,000 m^{2}) of land. The market has an assortment of vendors including produce, clothing, novelties, and antiques. The market has more than 1,600 vendors' spaces, 350 of which are covered; no admission fee; and more than 70 acres (280,000 m^{2}) of free parking. It is located off Ohio State Route 154, with access also available from Ohio State Route 7.

Weekly events include the weekly Friday flea market, with auctions of household items, antiques, farm fresh produce and livestock. Hays and grains are auctioned on Wednesdays, and the second Tuesday of each month is reserved for the equipment/consignment auction.

On July 25, 2014, the U.S. Immigration and Customs Enforcement raided more than one dozen vendors at the flea market for selling counterfeit consumer goods. The merchandise seized was worth over US$500,000. The sale of counterfeit goods violated the flea market's policies. The flea market resumed normal business on August 8.

On September 18, 2019, hay barrels inside a pavilon at the flea market caught fire and engulfed the entire structure within minutes.

== Government ==
Rogers operates under a mayor–council government, where there are six council members elected as a legislature in addition to an independently elected mayor who serves as an executive.

== Education ==
Children in Rogers are served by the public Beaver Local School District, which includes one elementary school, one middle school, and Beaver Local High School.

A public primary school in Rogers served students until 2015.

== Transportation ==
State Route 7 runs north–south through Rogers as Depot Street, and State Route 154 runs east–west through the village as Walnut Street. The short-line Youngstown and Southeastern Railroad passes through the community.

== Notable people ==
- Asher A. Galbreath, member of the Ohio Senate
- Charles Burleigh Galbreath, state librarian of the State Library of Ohio
